= 1946–47 Southampton F.C. season =

English football club season

Southampton F.C.
1946–47 season
- Chairman: Alf Jukes
- Manager: Bill Dodgin
- Stadium: The Dell
- Second Division: 14th
- FA Cup: Fourth round
- Top goalscorer: League: Jack Bradley (14); All: Jack Bradley (15); George Lewis (15)
- Highest home attendance: 25,746 v Newcastle United (12 October 1946)
- Lowest home attendance: 4,289 v Coventry City (5 February 1947)
- Average home league attendance: 16,039
- Biggest win: 4–0 v Swansea Town (4 September 1946)
- Biggest defeat: 0–6 v Nottingham Forest (18 January 1947)
Home colours

The 1946–47 season was the 46th year of competitive football played by Southampton F.C., the club's 20th season as members of the Football League, and their 18th competing in the Second Division. The Saints finished the campaign in 14th place in the league table, having gained 39 from a possible 84 points with 15 wins, 9 draws and 18 losses. The club also competed in the FA Cup, making it to the fourth round after just one win, against fellow Second Division side Bury.

Following a break due to the Second World War, league football resumed in England in 1946. The 1946–47 season was the club's first to feature Bill Dodgin as manager, who joined and played for the club during wartime, and was appointed manager in March 1946. In the summer before the start of the season, the Saints made a number of new signings, including bringing in full-back Bill Rochford from local rivals Portsmouth, who had just won the FA Cup, as well as centre-forward George Lewis for a "four-figure fee". Partway through the season, they signed wing-half Joe Mallett from Queens Park Rangers for a club record fee of £5,000. Due to the lack of official competition during wartime, many players made their official debuts for the club during the season, including eight in the first match.

During the season, 24 players appeared for Southampton in all competitions. New signing Bill Rochford featured in more games than any other player, appearing in 43 of the club's 44 games during the season (he missed just one league game, against Luton Town on 22 February 1947). Jack Bradley, who had joined the club during the abandoned 1939–40 season, finished as Southampton's top league scorer with 14 goals; Bradley and new signing George Lewis each scored 15 goals in all competitions. The club attracted an average home league attendance at The Dell of 16,039 – the highest attendance was 25,746 against Newcastle United.

== Pre-season friendlies ==
In preparation for the 1946–47 season, Southampton played two pre-season friendly matches. On 14 August 1946 the Saints won 4–1 against Irish club Bohemians, with new signing George Lewis and Don Roper scoring two goals each. They then beat French side Le Havre 7–0 at home thanks to a hat-trick from Don Roper, two goals from Doug McGibbon, and one each from Jack Bradley and Bobby Veck.

14 August 1946 Friendly	Bohemians	1–4	Southampton	Dublin, Ireland
	Goal		Lewis; Roper	Stadium: Dalymount Park

23 August 1946 Friendly	Southampton	7–0	Le Havre	Southampton
	Roper; McGibbon; Bradley; Veck			Stadium: The Dell

== Second Division ==
=== Season summary ===
After their initial opening game of the season against Newport County was postponed due to unseasonable flooding, Southampton began the 1946–47 season well with a 4–0 win over Swansea Town at home, with Doug McGibbon scoring a hat-trick. The team dropped down to 10th in the table with a draw and a loss, before beating Nottingham Forest convincingly 5–2 thanks to goals from McGibbon (two), Alf Freeman (two) and Jack Bradley. The Saints began to drop down the league table in October thanks to a winless run, but picked their form back up at the end of the month with wins over Newport County and Plymouth Argyle. The club's fortunes continued to change week on week, although they finished the year off strongly with a 5–1 win over Newport County to remain in the top ten going into 1947.

The new year began poorly for the Saints with three consecutive losses away from home in which the side conceded 11 goals, prompting Dodgin to replace regular goalkeeper George Ephgrave with Len Stansbridge for much of the rest of the season. Through February and March, the team won four out of seven matches (including a 5–2 home victory over Coventry City and three away wins) to move away from the relegation zone and back up to the top ten, although four straight losses against high-performing opponents saw them drop back down to 15th in April. Seven players were released by the club near the end of the month. Three wins from their last six matches meant that Southampton finished 14th in the Second Division table, improving on their 18th-place finish in the last pre-war season eight years earlier.

=== Final league table ===
Pos	Team	Pld	W	D	L	GF	GA	GAv	Pts
12	West Ham United	42	16	8	18	70	76	0.921	40
13	Luton Town	42	16	7	19	71	73	0.973	39
14	Southampton	42	15	9	18	69	76	0.908	39
15	Fulham	42	15	9	18	63	74	0.851	39
16	Bradford (Park Avenue)	42	14	11	17	65	77	0.844	39

Source: RSSSF
Rules for classification: 1) Points; 2) Goal average; 3) Goals scored

=== Results by matchday ===
Round	1	2	3	4	5	6	7	8	9	10	11	12	13	14	15	16	17	18	19	20	21	22	23	24	25	26	27	28	29	30	31	32	33	34	35	36	37	38	39	40	41	42
Ground	H	H	A	H	A	H	A	A	H	A	A	H	A	H	A	H	A	H	A	A	H	H	A	A	A	H	H	A	H	A	H	A	A	H	H	A	H	A	A	H	H	H
Result	W	D	L	W	L	W	L	L	D	D	W	W	L	D	L	W	D	W	L	D	D	W	L	L	L	W	L	W	L	W	L	W	L	L	L	L	W	D	L	W	W	D
Position	7	8	10	8	13	10	10	14	14	13	11	10	12	13	14	12	12	9	11	11	11	9	10	15	16	13	13	11	11	10	12	10	10	10	11	15	11	13	14	12	12	12

Source: statto.com
A = Away; H = Home; W = Win; D = Draw; L = Loss

=== Match results ===
4 September 1946 1	Southampton	4–0	Swansea Town	Southampton
	McGibbon 10', 25', 53'; Veck 41'			Stadium: The Dell; Attendance: 8,000

7 September 1946 2	Southampton	1–1	Bury	Southampton
	Bradley 16'		Kilshaw 68'	Stadium: The Dell; Attendance: 23,000

9 September 1946 3	Tottenham Hotspur	2–1	Southampton	London
	Rundle 4'; Bennett 43'		McGibbon 65'	Stadium: White Hart Lane; Attendance: 22,153

14 September 1946 4	Southampton	5–2	Nottingham Forest	Southampton
	McGibbon 1', 65'; Freeman 8', 54'; Bradley 37'		Edwards 32'; Johnston	Stadium: The Dell; Attendance: 17,991

21 September 1946 5	Coventry City	2–0	Southampton	Coventry
	Gardner 10'; Lowrie 60'			Stadium: Highfield Road; Attendance: 20,000

28 September 1946 6	Southampton	1–0	Birmingham City	Southampton
	Bradley 13'			Stadium: The Dell; Attendance: 24,920

3 October 1946 7	Swansea Town	4–2	Southampton	Swansea
	Lockhart 31'; Bradley 85'		Bates 44'; Ford 75', 80'; McCrory 89'	Stadium: Vetch Field; Attendance: 21,523

5 October 1946 8	West Bromwich Albion	2–0	Southampton	West Bromwich
	Clarke 6'; Duggan			Stadium: The Hawthorns; Attendance: 28,000

12 October 1946 9	Southampton	1–1	Newcastle United	Southampton
	Bates 61'		Shackleton 56'	Stadium: The Dell; Attendance: 25,746

19 October 1946 10	Luton Town	2–2	Southampton	Luton
	Connelly 58'; Daniel 72'		Roper; Bevis 62'	Stadium: Kenilworth Road; Attendance: 20,000

24 October 1946 11	Newport County	1–2	Southampton	Newport
	Carr 36'		Lewis 51'; Bevis 69'	Stadium: Rodney Parade; Attendance: 11,149

26 October 1946 12	Southampton	5–1	Plymouth Argyle	Southampton
	Bradley 9', 85'; Grant 35', 60'; McGibbon 82'		Rawlings 52' (pen.)	Stadium: The Dell; Attendance: 18,252

2 November 1946 13	Leicester City	2–0	Southampton	Leicester
	Dewis 3', 65'			Stadium: Filbert Street; Attendance: 20,000

9 November 1946 14	Southampton	1–1	Chesterfield	Southampton
	McGibbon 26'		Ottewell 73'	Stadium: The Dell; Attendance: 18,006

16 November 1946 15	Millwall	3–1	Southampton	London
	Hurrell 20', 75'; Mansfield 48'		Smith 40'	Stadium: The Den; Attendance: 24,413

23 November 1946 16	Southampton	3–2	Bradford Park Avenue	Southampton
	Roper 5'; Bevis 47'; Stroud 75'		Farrell 76' (pen.); Danskin 85'	Stadium: The Dell; Attendance: 16,249

30 November 1946 17	Manchester City	1–1	Southampton	Manchester
	Constantine 23'		Bates 43'	Stadium: Maine Road; Attendance: 24,867

7 December 1946 18	Southampton	4–2	West Ham United	Southampton
	Ellerington 19' (pen.); McGibbon 59'; Bevis 61'; Roper 77'		Bainbridge 53'; Payne 53'	Stadium: The Dell; Attendance: 17,305

14 December 1946 19	Sheffield Wednesday	3–0	Southampton	Sheffield
	Dailey 10', 80'; Ward 86'			Stadium: Hillsborough Stadium; Attendance: 10,000

25 December 1946 20	Barnsley	4–4	Southampton	Barnsley
	Pallister (pen.); Robledo; Morris; Bennett		Stroud 32'; Bevis 67'; Lewis 70', 78'	Stadium: Oakwell; Attendance: 16,200

26 December 1946 21	Southampton	1–1	Barnsley	Southampton
	Ramsey 88' (pen.)		Morris	Stadium: The Dell; Attendance: 21,556

28 December 1946 22	Southampton	5–1	Newport County	Southampton
	Lewis 6'; Bradley 23', 59'; Stroud 68'; Bevis 70'		Rawcliffe 83'	Stadium: The Dell; Attendance: 17,778

4 January 1947 23	Bury	2–1	Southampton	Bury
	Carter 70', 85'		Lewis 37'	Stadium: Gigg Lane; Attendance: 16,000

18 January 1947 24	Nottingham Forest	6–0	Southampton	Nottingham
	Lyman 5', 62'; Edwards 20'; Brown 43'; Barks 59'; Brigham 77'			Stadium: City Ground; Attendance: 20,000

1 February 1947 25	Birmingham City	3–1	Southampton	Birmingham
	Trigg 17', 83'; Mulraney 41'		Bradley 50'	Stadium: St Andrew's; Attendance: 32,878

5 February 1947 26	Southampton	5–2	Coventry City	Southampton
	Lewis 18', 22'; Roper 67'; Bradley 69'; Day 89'		Roberts 13', 17'	Stadium: The Dell; Attendance: 4,289 (Note: 4,289 is Southampton's lowest post-war home league attendance.)

8 February 1947 27	Southampton	0–1	West Bromwich Albion	Southampton
			Elliott 34'	Stadium: The Dell; Attendance: 8,000

15 February 1947 28	Newcastle United	1–3	Southampton	Newcastle upon Tyne
	Pearson 16'		Roper 3'; Day 66'; Stroud 82'	Stadium: St James' Park; Attendance: 35,000

22 February 1947 29	Southampton	1–3	Luton Town	Southampton
	Roper 37'		Driver 30'; Duggan 32', 50'	Stadium: The Dell; Attendance: 11,700

1 March 1947 30	Plymouth Argyle	2–3	Southampton	Plymouth
	Watkins 33'; Thomas 70'		Mallett 36'; Lewis 65', 84'	Stadium: Home Park; Attendance: 24,071

22 March 1947 31	Southampton	1–2	Millwall	Southampton
	Lewis 15'		Woodward 34'; Jinks 77'	Stadium: The Dell; Attendance: 14,922

29 March 1947 32	Bradford Park Avenue	2–3	Southampton	Bradford
	Smith 46', 80'		Lewis 27', 31'; Roper 53'	Stadium: Horsfall Stadium; Attendance: 10,000

4 April 1947 33	Burnley	1–0	Southampton	Burnley
	Kippax 80'			Stadium: Turf Moor; Attendance: 31,713

5 April 1947 34	Southampton	0–1	Manchester City	Southampton
			Smith 27'	Stadium: The Dell; Attendance: 24,197

7 April 1947 35	Southampton	0–1	Burnley	Southampton
			Knight 75'	Stadium: The Dell; Attendance: 19,319

12 April 1947 36	West Ham United	4–0	Southampton	London
	Neary 56'; Wood 50'; Parsons 71'			Stadium: Boleyn Ground; Attendance: 21,000

19 April 1947 37	Southampton	3–1	Sheffield Wednesday	Southampton
	Bradley 2', 68'; Roper 77'		Ward 10'	Stadium: The Dell; Attendance: 13,514

26 April 1947 38	Fulham	0–0	Southampton	London
				Stadium: Craven Cottage; Attendance: 14,087

3 May 1947 39	Chesterfield	5–0	Southampton	Chesterfield
	Swinscoe 6', 89'; G. Milburn 76' (pen.), 81'; Oliver 88'			Stadium: Saltergate; Attendance: 10,000

10 May 1947 40	Southampton	1–0	Tottenham Hotspur	Southampton
	Roper 12'			Stadium: The Dell; Attendance: 12,436

24 May 1947 41	Southampton	2–0	Fulham	Southampton
	Bates 25'; Bradley 70'			Stadium: The Dell; Attendance: 9,738

26 May 1947 42	Southampton	1–1	Leicester City	Southampton
	Bradley 39'		Smith 83'	Stadium: The Dell; Attendance: 9,905

== FA Cup ==
Bury (11 January 1947)

Southampton entered the 1946–47 FA Cup in the third round, facing fellow Second Division side Bury at home on 11 January 1947. The Saints controlled the game from the early exchanges, with Jack Bradley, George Lewis and Billy Bevis scoring within the first 16 minutes to put the hosts 3–0 up. Bury pulled one back before the break through a penalty, which was awarded due to a handball in the area by George Smith, and dominated the share of possession going into half-time. In the second half, the Saints quickly reasserted their dominance and made it 4–1 through a second goal from Lewis in the 52nd minute. After he was initially denied by the crossbar earlier on, Lewis did later complete his hat-trick (the club's first in the competition proper) when he converted following a run by Eric Webber.

Newcastle United (25 January 1947)

In the fourth round Southampton travelled to face Newcastle United, who were then second in the Second Division league table. The Saints took the lead in the 11th minute, as Don Roper shot from the outside of the box and scored due to a deflection off centre-half Frank Brennan. The lead remained until the break, however the hosts' pressure going into the break continued in the second half when Charlie Wayman equalised shortly after half-time. Nine minutes later he scored again, heading in a Doug Wright free-kick. Despite increased attacking pressure from the Saints, Wayman completed his hat-trick later in the game to put Newcastle through to the fifth round. The Magpies went on to make it to the semi-finals of the tournament, before being knocked out by eventual champions Charlton Athletic.

11 January 1947 Round 3	Southampton	5–1	Bury	Southampton
	Bradley; Lewis 10' 52'; Bevis 16'		32' (pen.)	Stadium: The Dell; Attendance: 19,701

25 January 1947 Round 4	Newcastle United	3–1	Southampton	Newcastle upon Tyne
	Wayman 50' 59'		Roper 11'	Stadium: St James' Park; Attendance: 55,873

== Post-season friendlies ==
Around the end of the season, Southampton played three more friendlies – two before the league had concluded, the third shortly after. The first saw the Saints travel to face Guernsey's international side on 14 May 1947, who they beat 2–1 thanks to goals from Jack Bradley and George Lewis. A week later, the Saints hosted Bournemouth & Boscombe Athletic for the Hampshire Professional Cup, a local exhibition trophy fixture. The game ended 1–1 after extra time, with Bradley scoring for Southampton, resulting in the sides sharing the title. Southampton's final 1947 pre-season friendly took place on 11 June, when they faced a team representing the British Army of the Rhine in Hanover, Germany as part of the commemoration of Liberation from Nazi Germany; the hosts won 4–1, with Don Roper scoring the consolation for the visitors.

14 May 1947 Friendly	Guernsey	1–2	Southampton	Guernsey
	Goal		Bradley; Lewis

21 May 1947 Friendly	Southampton	1–1 (a.e.t.)	Bournemouth & Boscombe Athletic	Southampton
	Bradley		Goal	Stadium: The Dell

11 June 1947 Friendly	British Army of the Rhine XI	4–1	Southampton	Hanover, Germany
	Goal		Roper

== Squad statistics ==
Name	Pos.	Nat.	League		FA Cup		Total	
Name	Pos.	Nat.	Apps.	Gls.	Apps.	Gls.	Apps.	Gls.
Ted Bates	FW	(England)	22	4	0	0	22	4
Billy Bevis	FW	(England)	14	5	2	1	16	6
Jack Bradley	FW	(England)	38	14	2	1	40	15
Bill Bushby	HB	(England)	2	0	0	0	2	0
Stan Clements	HB	(England)	2	0	0	0	2	0
Eric Day	FW	(England)	19	2	2	0	21	2
Bill Ellerington	FB	(England)	19	1	1	0	20	1
George Ephgrave	GK	(England)	29	0	2	0	31	0
Alf Freeman	FW	(England)	7	2	0	0	7	2
Wilf Grant	FW	(England)	21	3	0	0	21	3
Jack Gregory	FB	(England)	1	0	0	0	1	0
George Horsfall	HB	(Australia)	2	0	0	0	2	0
George Lewis	FW	(Wales)	28	12	2	3	30	15
Joe Mallett	HB	(England)	13	1	0	0	13	1
Alf Ramsey	FB	(England)	23	1	1	0	24	1
Bill Rochford	FB	(England)	41	0	2	0	43	0
Albie Roles	FB	(England)	0	0	0	0	0	0
Don Roper	FW	(England)	40	8	2	1	42	9
George Smith	HB	(England)	34	1	2	0	36	1
Len Stansbridge	GK	(England)	13	0	0	0	13	0
Bobby Veck	FW	(England)	12	1	0	0	12	1
Eric Webber	HB	(England)	40	0	2	0	42	0
Len Wilkins	HB	(England)	0	0	0	0	0	0
Players with appearances who left the club before the end of the season
Harry Evans	FW	(England)	1	0	0	0	1	0
Doug McGibbon	FW	(England)	12	9	0	0	12	9
Bill Stroud	HB	(England)	29	4	2	0	31	4

=== Most appearances ===
No.	Name	Pos.	Nat.	League		FA Cup		Total		
No.	Name	Pos.	Nat.	Apps.	Mins.	Apps.	Mins.	Apps.	Mins.	%
1	Bill Rochford	FB	(England)	41	3,690	2	180	43	3,870	97.73%
2	Don Roper	FW	(England)	40	3,600	2	180	42	3,780	95.45%
2	Eric Webber	HB	(England)	40	3,600	2	180	42	3,780	95.45%
4	Jack Bradley	FW	(England)	38	3,420	2	180	40	3,600	90.91%
5	George Smith	HB	(England)	34	3,060	2	180	36	3,240	81.82%
6	George Ephgrave	GK	(England)	29	2,610	2	180	31	2,790	70.45%
6	Bill Stroud	HB	(England)	29	2,610	2	180	31	2,790	70.45%
8	George Lewis	FW	(Wales)	28	2,520	2	180	30	2,700	68.18%
9	Alf Ramsey	FB	(England)	23	2,070	1	90	24	2,160	54.55%
10	Ted Bates	FW	(England)	22	1,980	0	0	22	1,980	50.00%

=== Top goalscorers ===
No.	Name	Pos.	Nat.	League		FA Cup		Total		
No.	Name	Pos.	Nat.	Gls.	Apps.	Gls.	Apps.	Gls.	Apps.	GPG
1	George Lewis	FW	(Wales)	12	28	3	2	15	30	0.50
1	Jack Bradley	FW	(England)	14	38	1	2	15	40	0.37
3	Doug McGibbon	FW	(England)	9	12	0	0	9	12	0.75
3	Don Roper	FW	(England)	8	40	1	2	9	42	0.21
5	Billy Bevis	FW	(England)	5	14	1	2	6	16	0.37
6	Ted Bates	FW	(England)	4	22	0	0	4	22	0.18
6	Bill Stroud	HB	(England)	4	29	0	2	4	31	0.12
8	Alf Freeman	FW	(England)	2	7	0	0	2	7	0.28
8	Eric Day	FW	(England)	2	19	0	2	2	21	0.09

== Transfers ==
Players transferred in
Date	Pos.	Name	Club	Fee	Ref.
April 1946	GK	(England) George Ephgrave	(England) Swindon Town	Free	
July 1946	FB	(England) Bill Rochford	(England) Portsmouth	£550	
July 1946	FW	(England) George Lewis	(England) Watford	£1,000+ (Note: Lewis's transfer fee is generally reported as "a four-figure fee".)	
September 1946	HB	(England) Bill Bushby	(England) Portsmouth	Free	
October 1946	FW	(England) Wilf Grant	(England) Manchester City	Free	
February 1947	HB	(England) Joe Mallett	(England) Queens Park Rangers	£5,000 (Note: Joe Mallett's £5,000 transfer fee was a club record at the time.)	
Players transferred out
Date	Pos.	Name	Club	Fee	Ref.
September 1946	FB	(England) Tom Emanuel	(Wales) Llanelli	Free	
January 1947	FW	(England) Doug McGibbon	(England) Fulham	£4,250	
Players released
Date	Pos.	Name	Subsequent club	Join date	Ref.
April 1947	FW	(England) Harry Evans	(England) Exeter City	June 1947	
April 1947	HB	(England) Bill Stroud	(England) Leyton Orient	June 1947	

== Bibliography ==
- Chalk, Gary; Holley, Duncan; Bull, David (November 2013), All the Saints: A Complete Players' Who's Who of Southampton FC, Bristol, England: Hagiology Publishing, ISBN 978-0-9926864-0-6
- Holley, Duncan; Chalk, Gary (2003), Bull, David (ed.), In That Number: A Post-War Chronicle of Southampton FC, Bristol, England: Hagiology Publishing, ISBN 0-9534474-3-X
