= 1945–46 Southampton F.C. season =

English football club season

Southampton F.C.
1945–46 season
- Chairman: Alf Jukes
- Manager: Arthur Dominy
- Stadium: The Dell
- FA Cup: Fourth round
- Top goalscorer: League: n/a All: Jack Bradley and Doug McGibbon (2)
Home colours

The 1945–46 Southampton F.C. season was the club's 45th season of competitive football and their first since 1938–39. Following the abandonment of league football during World War II, the club competed in the FA Cup in 1945–46 before the Football League returned the next year. The Saints played Newport County in the third round of the FA Cup, who had been promoted to the Second Division as champions of the Third Division South at the end of the 1938–39 season. After beating them 6–4 on aggregate over two legs, the club played another previous Third Division South side, Queens Park Rangers, in the fourth round, which they lost 3–5 on aggregate.

Across their four FA Cup fixtures, Southampton used 13 players and had seven different goalscorers. Their top scorers were Jack Bradley and Doug McGibbon, both of whom scored twice in four appearances. The other players to feature in all four games were goalkeeper Len Stansbridge, full-back Albie Roles, half-backs Bill Dodgin and Bill Stroud, and forwards Ted Bates, Harry Evans and Don Roper. Alongside the FA Cup, Southampton also competed in the wartime Football League South division, a temporary competition which is not included in official English football records. The South Coast side finished 16th in the league's only full season.

== FA Cup ==
Due to the continued suspension of the Football League during the 1945–46 season, FA Cup matches from the first round through to the quarter-finals were played over two legs, in order to increase the number of – and income from – fixtures during the reduced campaign. As a Football League club, Southampton entered the tournament in the third round. They were drawn against Welsh side Newport County, who had secured promotion to the Second Division as champions of the Third Division South at the end of the 1938–39 season. In a hard-fought first leg at The Dell, the Saints defeated County 4–3 thanks to goals from Ted Bates, Jack Bradley, Doug McGibbon and Don Roper. In the return leg at Newport's Somerton Park five days later, the Hampshire club once again edged out the Second Division newcomers, winning 2–1 thanks to goals from McGibbon and Bobby Veck. In the fourth round, Southampton faced Third Division South side Queens Park Rangers. The first fixture, at home, saw the Saints lose 0–1 to Rangers. In the second leg, Southampton managed to score three times through Bradley, Billy Bevis and Bill Ellerington, but still succumbed to a 3–4 defeat to see them fail to make it past the second stage of the tournament for the 13th time in a row.

5 January 1946 Round 3 Leg 1	Southampton	4–3	Newport County	Southampton
	Bates; Bradley; McGibbon; Roper			Stadium: The Dell

10 January 1946 Round 3 Leg 2	Newport County	1–2 (6–4 agg.)	Southampton	Newport
			McGibbon; Veck	Stadium: Somerton Park

26 January 1946 Round 4 Leg 1	Southampton	0–1	Queens Park Rangers	Southampton
				Stadium: The Dell

30 January 1946 Round 4 Leg 2	Queens Park Rangers	4–3 (5–3 agg.)	Southampton	London
			Bradley; Bevis; Ellerington	Stadium: Loftus Road

== Other matches ==
Aside from the FA Cup and the "unofficial" Football League South competition, Southampton played an additional three fixtures during the 1945–46 season. The first was a friendly against Bournemouth & Boscombe Athletic on 2 May 1945, which the Saints won 3–1 thanks to goals from guest player John Sherratt and outside-forward Bobby Veck. The two Hampshire sides met again just nine days later in the Hampshire Combination Cup, which Bournemouth won 4–3. A second friendly, between Southampton and French side Le Havre on 28 May 1945, finished in a 1–1 draw – Don Roper scoring for the visiting Southampton.

2 May 1945 Friendly	Bournemouth & Boscombe Athletic	1–3	Southampton	Bournemouth
			Sherratt; Veck	Stadium: Dean Court

11 May 1945 Hampshire CC	Southampton	4–3	Bournemouth & Boscombe Athletic	Southampton
	Davies; Bates			Stadium: The Dell

28 May 1945 Friendly	Le Havre AC	1–1	Southampton	Le Havre
			Roper	Stadium: Stade Jules Deschaseaux

== Player details ==
Name	Pos.	Nat.	FA Cup	
Name	Pos.	Nat.	Apps.	Gls.
Ted Bates	FW	(England)	4	1
Billy Bevis	FW	(England)	1	1
Jack Bradley	FW	(England)	4	2
Bill Dodgin	HB	(England)	4	0
Bill Ellerington	FB	(England)	2	1
Tom Emanuel	FB	(England)	2	0
Harry Evans	FW	(England)	4	0
Doug McGibbon	FW	(England)	4	2
Albie Roles	FB	(England)	4	0
Don Roper	FW	(England)	4	1
Len Stansbridge	GK	(England)	4	0
Bill Stroud	HB	(England)	4	0
Bobby Veck	FW	(England)	3	1

== Bibliography ==
- Chalk, Gary; Holley, Duncan (10 August 1987), A Complete Record of Southampton Football Club: 1885–1987, Derby, England: Breedon Books, ISBN 978-0907969228
- Chalk, Gary; Holley, Duncan; Bull, David (28 November 2013), All the Saints: A Complete Who's Who of Southampton FC, Bristol, England: Hagiology Publishing, ISBN 978-0992686406
