= Ephgrave =

Ephgrave is a surname. Notable people with the surname include:

- George Ephgrave (1918–2004), English footballer
- Nick Ephgrave (fl. 2016, British police officer
