= Arthur Farrell (disambiguation) =

Arthur Farrell (1877–1909) was a Canadian professional ice hockey forward.

Arthur Farrell may also refer to:

- Arthur Farrell (footballer) (1920–2000), professional footballer
- Arthur Farrell (Battle Angel Alita: Last Order)
- Arthur Farrell, character in The Pipes o' Pan
