= Bill Bushby (footballer) =

English footballer (1914–1997)

Personal information
- Full name: Thomas William Bushby
- Date of birth: 21 August 1914
- Place of birth: Shildon, England
- Date of death: 23 December 1997 (aged 83)
- Place of death: Warsash, England
- Height: 5 ft 10 in (1.78 m)
- Position: Half back

Youth career
- Timothy Hackworth School
- Durham County Schools
- Shildon Amateurs
- Southend United

Senior career*
Years	Team	Apps	(Gls)
1934–1939	Southend United		
1939–1940	Portsmouth		
1940–1946	Folland Aircraft		
1946–1947	Southampton	2	(0)
1947–1954	Cowes		

Managerial career
- 1954: Sarisbury
- * Club domestic league appearances and goals

Thomas William Bushby (21 August 1914 – 23 December 1997) was an English footballer who played as a half back. Born in Shildon, Bushby began his career with Southend United in 1934, and later played for a number of Hampshire-based teams including Portsmouth and Southampton, before retiring from professional football in 1947.

== Life and career ==
After beginning his football career with local youth sides in his hometown of Shildon, County Durham, Bushby moved to Third Division South side Southend United in September 1933, signing professional terms with the club in October 1934. He remained with Southend for five seasons, making 40 League, 4 FA Cup and 2 Third Division South Cup appearances after which he moved to Portsmouth (then in the First Division) in June 1939 as a replacement for regular half back Jimmy Guthrie, who had been injured in a car accident earlier that year.

During the Second World War, Bushby played the majority of his football with Folland Aircraft Football Club, a team formed by the workers of Folland Aircraft, although also appeared for Southampton and Chelsea in a number of unofficial wartime matches. Following the end of the conflicts, Bushby moved permanently to Southampton in September 1946, appearing twice for the club at right half in games against West Bromwich Albion on 5 October 1946 and Birmingham City on 1 February 1947. Ultimately he could not retain his position in the team ahead of players like Bill Stroud and George Smith though, and left near the end of the season to join Cowes.

Bushby, although with Portsmouth also made 1 Wartime appearance for Clapton Orient, this was at Portsmouth on 20 February 1943. Orient wing half Bobby Black missed the train and so Pompey Manager Jack Tinn allowed Bushby to play for Orient against his teammates giving a sterling performance.

In May 1947 Bushby was offered a professional contract by Aldershot, but he ultimately turned it down and remained with Cowes on non-professional terms (while working with Folland Aircraft), thus signifying an end to his professional playing career. Bushby did remain with Cowes for seven years however, making 232 consecutive appearances between 1947 and 1954, and he later went on to manage the football team of Sarisbury, a village near the Hampshire town of Fareham.

Bushby later relocated to Warsash, and died on 23 December 1997 at the age of 83.
