= Martin Bradley (footballer) =

English footballer

Personal information
- Date of birth: 1886
- Place of birth: Goldenhill, England
- Date of death: 1958 (aged 71–72)
- Position: Inside forward

Youth career
- South Kirkby

Senior career*
Years	Team	Apps	(Gls)
1907–1908	Grimsby Town	28	(6)
1908–1910	Mexborough Town		
1910–1911	Sheffield Wednesday	2	(0)
1911–191?	Bristol Rovers		
- * Club domestic league appearances and goals

Martin Bradley (1886–1958) was an English professional footballer who played as an inside-right in the period before World War I.

== Club history ==
Bradley was born at Wolstanton on the outskirts of Newcastle-under-Lyme, Staffordshire. Bradley began his career with South Kirkby he joined Grimsby Town of the Football League Second Division in 1907. After a season at Blundell Park, he dropped down to the Midland League with Mexborough Town.

He signed for Sheffield Wednesday in April 1910 with whom he briefly returned to top-flight football and made two appearances for, before joining Bristol Rovers in May 1911, where he ended his career in the Southern League. His transfer to Sheffield Wednesday was part of a double swoop for the Sheffield club, who paid Mexborough Town £70 up front for Bradley and Laurie Burkinshaw, with a promise of a further £60 the following season if the pair went on to do well.

== Personal life ==
Martin's son, Jack (1916–2002) played at inside forward for various clubs in the 1930s and 1940s, including Swindon Town, Southampton and Bolton Wanderers. His brother was James Bradley (1881–1954), who was a member of Liverpool's Championship winning side of 1905–06 and also played for Stoke in the 1890s.

In the First World War he served with the King's Own Yorkshire Light Infantry, and following the war with the Royal Army Service Corps, until returning to South Kirkby to work in the colliery.
