= 1949–50 Tottenham Hotspur F.C. season =

English football club season

Tottenham Hotspur
1950–51 season
- Chairman: Fred J. Bearman
- Manager: Arthur Rowe
- Stadium: White Hart Lane
- Second Division: 1st (promoted)
- FA Cup: Fifth round
- Top goalscorer: Les Medley (18)
- Highest home attendance: 70,305 (25 Feb 1950 vs Southampton)
- Biggest win: 7–0 (12 Nov 1949 vs Sheffield United)
Home colours	Away colours	Third colours

The 1949–50 season saw Tottenham win the Second Division and gain promotion back to the First Division. Spurs also completed in the FA Cup and made it to the Fifth round only to be knocked out by Everton at Goodison Park.

This was Arthur Rowe's first season after being appointed Tottenham manager. He used the push-and-run system which provided much success with a 23-game unbeaten run.

== Squad ==
Note: Flags indicate national team as defined under FIFA eligibility rules; some limited exceptions apply. Players may hold more than one non-FIFA nationality.

Pos.	Nation	Player
GK	ENG	Ted Ditchburn
DF	ENG	Alf Ramsey
DF	ENG	Sid Tickridge
DF	ENG	Harry Clarke
DF	ENG	Arthur Willis
DF	ENG	George Ludford
DF	ENG	Charlie Withers
MF	ENG	Les Medley
MF	WAL	Ron Burgess

Pos.	Nation	Player
MF	ENG	Sonny Walters
MF	ENG	Bobby Cook
MF	ENG	Tony Marchi
MF	ENG	Bill Nicholson
MF	WAL	Billy Rees
FW	ENG	Eddie Baily
FW	ENG	Les Bennett
FW	ENG	Len Duquemin
FW	ENG	Jimmy Scarth

== Transfers ==
=== In ===
Date from	Position	Nationality	Name	From	Fee	Ref.
15 May 1949	RB	ENG	Alf Ramsey	Southampton	£21,000 part deal	

=== Out ===
Date	Position	Nationality	Name	To	Fee	Ref.
15 May 1949	FW	WAL	Ernie Jones	Southampton	Part deal	

== Competitions ==
=== Second Division ===
Pos	Team	Pld	W	D	L	GF	GA	GAv	Pts	Qualification or relegation
1	Tottenham Hotspur (C, P)	42	27	7	8	81	35	2.314	61	Promotion to the First Division
2	Sheffield Wednesday (P)	42	18	16	8	67	48	1.396	52	Promotion to the First Division
3	Sheffield United	42	19	14	9	68	49	1.388	52	
4	Southampton	42	19	14	9	64	48	1.333	52	
5	Leeds United	42	17	13	12	54	45	1.200	47	

Rules for classification: 1) Points; 2) Goal average; 3) Goals scored
(C) Champions; (P) Promoted

=== Fixtures ===
20 August 1949 1	Brentford	1–4	Tottenham Hotspur	Brentford, London
			Bennett; Duquemin; Medley	Stadium: Griffin Park; Attendance: 32,702

22 August 1949 2	Tottenham Hotspur	4–1	Plymouth Argyle	Tottenham, London
				Stadium: White Hart Lane; Attendance: 41,882

27 August 1949 3	Tottenham Hotspur	2–3	Blackburn Rovers	Tottenham, London
				Stadium: White Hart Lane; Attendance: 53,716

31 August 1949 4	Plymouth Argyle	0–2	Tottenham Hotspur	Plymouth
				Stadium: Home Park; Attendance: 24,828

3 September 1949 5	Cardiff City	0–1	Tottenham Hotspur	Cardiff
				Stadium: Ninian Park; Attendance: 42,649

5 September 1949 6	Tottenham Hotspur	1–0	Sheffield Wednesday	Tottenham, London
				Stadium: White Hart Lane; Attendance: 37,697

10 September 1949 7	Tottenham Hotspur	2–0	Leeds United	Tottenham, London
				Stadium: White Hart Lane; Attendance: 48,274

17 September 1949 8	Tottenham Hotspur	3–1	Bury	Tottenham, London
				Stadium: White Hart Lane; Attendance: 54,438

24 September 1949 9	Leicester City	1–2	Tottenham Hotspur	Leicester
				Stadium: Filbert Street; Attendance: 36,846

1 October 1949 10	Tottenham Hotspur	5–0	Bradford Park Avenue	Tottenham, London
				Stadium: White Hart Lane; Attendance: 54,905

8 October 1949 11	Southampton	1–1	Tottenham Hotspur	Southampton
				Stadium: The Dell; Attendance: 30,240

15 October 1949 12	Tottenham Hotspur	3–1	Coventry City	Tottenham, London
				Stadium: White Hart Lane; Attendance: 54,375

22 October 1949 13	Luton Town	1–1	Tottenham Hotspur	Luton
				Stadium: Kenilworth Road; Attendance: 27,319

29 October 1949 14	Tottenham Hotspur	2–0	Barnsley	Tottenham, London
				Stadium: White Hart Lane; Attendance: 54,856

5 November 1949 15	West Ham United	0–1	Tottenham Hotspur	Upton Park, London
				Stadium: Boleyn Ground; Attendance: 31,734

12 November 1949 16	Tottenham Hotspur	7–0	Sheffield United	Tottenham, London
				Stadium: White Hart Lane; Attendance: 54,193

19 November 1949 17	Grimsby Town	2–3	Tottenham Hotspur	Cleethorpes, Lincolnshire
				Stadium: Blundell Park; Attendance: 22,482

26 November 1949 18	Tottenham Hotspur	3–0	Queens Park Rangers	Tottenham, London
				Stadium: White Hart Lane; Attendance: 62,783

3 December 1949 19	Preston North End	1–3	Tottenham Hotspur	Preston
				Stadium: Deepdale; Attendance: 35,501

10 December 1949 20	Tottenham Hotspur	3–1	Swansea Town	Tottenham, London
				Stadium: White Hart Lane; Attendance: 50,758

17 December 1949 21	Tottenham Hotspur	1–1	Brentford	Tottenham, London
				Stadium: White Hart Lane; Attendance: 49,297

24 December 1949 22	Blackburn Rovers	1–2	Tottenham Hotspur	Blackburn
				Stadium: Ewood Park; Attendance: 33,078

26 December 1949 23	Tottenham Hotspur	1–0	Chesterfield	Tottenham, London
				Stadium: White Hart Lane; Attendance: 61,879

27 December 1949 24	Chesterfield	1–1	Tottenham Hotspur	Chesterfield
				Stadium: Saltergate; Attendance: 26,341

31 December 1949 25	Tottenham Hotspur	2–0	Cardiff City	Tottenham, London
				Stadium: White Hart Lane; Attendance: 59,780

14 January 1950 26	Leeds United	3–0	Tottenham Hotspur	Leeds
				Stadium: Elland Road; Attendance: 50,476

21 January 1950 27	Bury	1–2	Tottenham Hotspur	Bury, Greater Manchester
				Stadium: Gigg Lane; Attendance: 27,386

4 February 1950 28	Tottenham Hotspur	0–2	Leicester City	Tottenham, London
				Stadium: White Hart Lane; Attendance: 60,595

18 February 1950 29	Bradford Park Avenue	1–3	Tottenham Hotspur	Bradford
				Stadium: Horsfall Stadium; Attendance: 20,287

25 February 1950 30	Tottenham Hotspur	4–0	Southampton	Tottenham, London
				Stadium: White Hart Lane; Attendance: 70,302

4 March 1950 31	Coventry City	0–1	Tottenham Hotspur	Coventry
				Stadium: Highfield Road; Attendance: 36,320

11 March 1950 32	Tottenham Hotspur	0–0	Luton Town	Tottenham, London
				Stadium: White Hart Lane; Attendance: 53,145

18 March 1950 33	Barnsley	2–0	Tottenham Hotspur	Barnsley
				Stadium: Oakwell; Attendance: 22,346

25 March 1950 34	Tottenham Hotspur	4–1	West Ham United	Tottenham, London
				Stadium: White Hart Lane; Attendance: 51,124

1 April 1950 35	Queens Park Rangers	0–2	Tottenham Hotspur	Shepherd's Bush, London
				Stadium: Loftus Road; Attendance: 29,771

7 April 1950 36	Tottenham Hotspur	0–0	Hull City	Tottenham, London
				Stadium: White Hart Lane; Attendance: 66,889

8 April 1950 37	Tottenham Hotspur	2–3	Preston North End	Tottenham, London
				Stadium: White Hart Lane; Attendance: 49,710

10 April 1950 38	Hull City	1–0	Tottenham Hotspur	Kingston upon Hull
				Stadium: Boothferry Park; Attendance: 38,345

15 April 1950 39	Sheffield United	2–1	Tottenham Hotspur	Sheffield
				Stadium: Bramall Lane; Attendance: 41,419

22 April 1950 40	Tottenham Hotspur	1–2	Grimsby Town	Tottenham, London
				Stadium: White Hart Lane; Attendance: 46,423

29 April 1950 41	Swansea Town	1–0	Tottenham Hotspur	Swansea
				Stadium: Vetch Field; Attendance: 16,417

6 May 1950 42	Sheffield Wednesday	0–0	Tottenham Hotspur	Sheffield
				Stadium: Hillsborough Stadium; Attendance: 50,777

=== FA Cup ===
==== Fixtures ====
7 January 1950 3	Stoke City	0–1	Tottenham Hotspur	Stoke-on-Trent
			Baily	Stadium: Victoria Ground; Attendance: 47,000

28 January 1950 4	Tottenham Hotspur	5–1	Sunderland	Tottenham
	Walters; Bennett; Medley			Stadium: White Hart Lane; Attendance: 66,245

11 February 1950 5	Everton	1–0	Tottenham Hotspur	Liverpool
	Wainwright			Stadium: Goodison Park; Attendance: 72,921

== Works cited ==
- Soar, Phil (1995). Tottenham Hotspur The Official Illustrated History 1882–1995. Hamlyn. ISBN 0-600-58706-1.
- Goodwin, Bob (1992). The Spurs Alphabet. ACL & Polar Publishing (UK) Ltd. ISBN 0-9514862-8-4.
