= Jack Bradley (footballer) =

English footballer (1916–2002)

Personal information
- Full name: John Bradley
- Date of birth: 27 November 1916
- Place of birth: Hemsworth, England
- Date of death: 14 December 2002 (aged 86)
- Place of death: Gorleston, England
- Height: 5 ft 10 in (1.78 m)
- Position: Inside forward

Youth career
- South Kirkby

Senior career*
Years	Team	Apps	(Gls)
1935–1936	Huddersfield Town	0	(0)
1936–1938	Swindon Town	25	(6)
1938–1939	Chelsea	0	(0)
1939–1947	Southampton	49	(22)
1947–1950	Bolton Wanderers	92	(19)
1950–1952	Norwich City	6	(0)
1952–1955	Great Yarmouth Town		
Total		172	(47)

Managerial career
- 1952–1955: Great Yarmouth Town
- * Club domestic league appearances and goals

John Bradley (27 November 1916 – 14 December 2002) was an English footballer who played as an inside forward for various clubs in the 1930s and 1940s, including Swindon Town, Southampton and Bolton Wanderers.

== Playing career ==
Bradley was born in Hemsworth, West Yorkshire and, after playing youth football with South Kirkby, he joined Huddersfield Town in November 1935. He did not make any first team appearances for Huddersfield, and in August 1936 he was transferred to Swindon Town of the Third Division South.

Bradley spent two seasons with Swindon, making 25 league appearances in which he scored six goals. In the FA Cup he scored twice in a 6–0 victory over Dulwich Hamlet in the First Round on 28 November 1936. The following season, he went one better scoring a hat trick (including two penalties) in a 4–3 win over Gillingham on 27 November 1937, his 21st birthday.

In June 1938, he moved to Chelsea but again made no first team appearances before being transferred to Southampton in May 1939.

=== Southampton ===
He joined Southampton in readiness for the 1939–40 season, but had not broken into the first team before League football was abandoned following the outbreak of the Second World War. At the start of the war, he joined the Police War Reserve and remained in Southampton, playing in the Football League South war leagues.

In 1940, Bradley joined the Royal Air Force and his postings took him all over England. During the war he guested for several clubs, including Grantham Town, where he made 20 appearances in the 1945–46 season, Reading, Luton Town, Blackpool, Millwall, Aldershot, Rotherham United, Hereford United and Rochdale.

He returned to The Dell in 1945 and was soon scoring regularly in the League South in 1945–46, with 14 goals from 25 league appearances, plus two in the FA Cup. According to Holley & Chalk, Bradley was "big and strong, (with) a powerful left foot that he put to good use during his short spell with the Saints".

On the resumption of League football in 1946, Bradley became the established inside left, with either Doug McGibbon or George Lewis at centre-forward. The outside left position was filled in turn by Bobby Veck, Wilf Grant and Eric Day as manager Bill Dodgin was assembling a team to try to gain promotion from the Second Division. Bradley finished his first League season with the "Saints" as joint top-scorer (with George Lewis) on 15 goals, as Southampton finished a lowly 14th.

In June 1947, the Saints went to Germany where they played a "Liberation Day" match against a local side. During this tour, Bradley's drinking upset manager Dodgin; Bradley in turn complained that Dodgin's coaching methods, involving the use of a blackboard, were "too fussy". Although Bradley started the 1947–48 season in blistering form, scoring in each of the opening five matches with seven goals in all, Dodgin could not forgive what he saw as a serious flouting of club discipline and Bradley was transferred to Bolton Wanderers for a fee of £8000, plus Billy Wrigglesworth coming in the opposite direction.

=== Bolton Wanderers ===
At Burnden Park he finally got his chance to play in the First Division. He soon became established at inside left, alongside future international players such as Nat Lofthouse, Malcolm Barrass and Willie Moir. Despite this array of talent, Bolton struggled in the First Division, finishing each of Bradley's three seasons in the lower half of the table. Speaking in 1996, Lofthouse remembered his former team-mate: "By God! Jack Bradley had the best left foot I've ever seen in my life."

In March 1948, Bradley came down with flu but refused to miss a game for Bolton, noting in the press that he had not missed a game through injury for over 12 years. By November 1950, Bradley had lost his place to Harry Webster and was transferred to Norwich City, where he made only six appearances over the next two seasons before being transfer listed in May 1952.

== Coaching with Great Yarmouth Town ==
In June 1952, Bradley took up the post of player-manager of Great Yarmouth Town of the Eastern Counties League. Whilst the "Bloaters" achieved little in the league under Bradley's management, finishing fifth in his first two seasons, they had some success in the FA Cup.

In 1952–53, Great Yarmouth reached the Second Round proper for the first time ever, where they were defeated 2–1 by Wrexham. The following season, Great Yarmouth pulled off a giant-killing act, by defeating Crystal Palace of the Third Division South 1–0, with the goal being scored by Derrick Rackham in the sixth minute, before going out to Barrow in the Second Round.

== After football ==
Bradley resigned from the managerial post at Great Yarmouth in 1955, but remained in Norfolk, becoming the licensee of the Jolly Farmers pub in the village of Ormesby St Margaret near Great Yarmouth where he remained for 27 years.

Following his death in 2002, his ashes were scattered on the Great Yarmouth pitch at The Wellesley Recreation Ground.

== Family ==
Bradley's father, Martin (1886–1958) played at inside forward for Grimsby Town, Sheffield Wednesday and Bristol Rovers between 1907 and 1914.

His uncle was James Bradley (1881–1954), who was a member of Liverpool's Championship winning side of 1905–06 and also played for Stoke in the 1890s.
