= Tommy Ward (footballer, born 1917) =

English footballer

Personal information
- Full name: Thomas Alfred Ward
- Date of birth: 6 August 1917
- Place of birth: Wolsingham, England
- Date of death: 1992 (Note: Ward's death was registered in the fourth quarter of 1992 in the Scunthorpe registration district, which covers the area known since 1996 as North Lincolnshire.) (aged 75)
- Place of death: North Lincolnshire, England
- Height: 5 ft 7 1/2 in (1.71 m)
- Position: Forward

Senior career*
Years	Team	Apps	(Gls)
19??–1937	Crook Town		
1937–1948	Sheffield Wednesday	35	(19)
1948–1954	Darlington	119	(32)
Total		154	(51)
- * Club domestic league appearances and goals

Thomas Alfred Ward (6 August 1917 – 1992) was an English footballer who scored 51 goals from 154 appearances in the Football League playing as a forward for Sheffield Wednesday and Darlington in the years following the Second World War.

== Life and career ==
Ward was born in Wolsingham, County Durham, and played football for nearby Crook Town before signing for Football League Second Division club Sheffield Wednesday in March 1937. He never played for the first team before the Second World War, made a guest appearance for Leeds United in wartime football in 1945, and by the time the Football League resumed after the war, he was already 29 years old. He made his debut in the 1945–46 FA Cup, and contributed 18 goals from 28 league matches in the first post-war league season. Despite such a strong scoring record, Jimmy Dailey and then Clarrie Jordan were preferred in the following campaign. Ward played only seven more times, scoring once, and then returned to the north-east to sign for Third Division North club Darlington at the end of the season. He remained with the club for six years, and played 119 league matches in which he scored 32 goals. Alongside his football career, Ward worked as an undertaker.
