= George Lewis (footballer, born 1913) =

Welsh footballer (1913–1981)

Personal information
- Full name: Thomas George Lewis
- Date of birth: 20 October 1913
- Place of birth: Troed-y-rhiw, Wales
- Date of death: 6 August 1981 (aged 67)
- Place of death: Hemel Hempstead, England
- Height: 6 ft 0 in (1.83 m)
- Position: Centre forward

Youth career
- Troed-y-rhiw
- New Tredegar

Senior career*
Years	Team	Apps	(Gls)
1930–1946	Watford	25	(11)
1946–1948	Southampton	43	(12)
1948–1949	Brighton & Hove Albion	24	(8)
1949–1952	Dartford		
- * Club domestic league appearances and goals

Thomas George Lewis (20 October 1913 – 6 August 1981) was a Welsh footballer who played as a centre-forward for Watford in the late 1930s, before joining Southampton for a brief period after World War II.

== Football career ==
=== Watford ===
Lewis was born in Troed-y-rhiw in Glamorgan and after playing youth football with his village side and then in the nearby town of New Tredegar followed his elder brother Jim to join Watford. He initially joined Watford as an amateur at 17, before signing his first professional contract in May 1934.

Lewis stayed at Vicarage Road until the war, making irregular appearances in the Football League Third Division South, firstly, like his brother, at left back before moving to centre forward in 1937–38. His most successful league season was 1938–39 when he scored nine goals from 13 appearances.

During the war he was an Army P.T. instructor, although he made guest appearances for Chester City. He spent one more season with Watford after the end of the war, in which there was no League football. Lewis played in eight FA Cup matches as Watford reached round four before being eliminated by Birmingham City. Lewis scored three goals during the cup run, including the equaliser against Nottingham Forest in round three.

=== Southampton ===
In July 1946, he joined Second Division Southampton for a "four figure fee". Described as a "well-built centre-forward" with a "never-say-die" attitude, Lewis enjoyed a fine first season at The Dell, despite problems at the start of the season with a hamstring injury. He made his debut on 3 October 1946, taking over from the injured Doug McGibbon, in a 2–4 defeat at Swansea. After a run of five games, in which he only found the net once, he was replaced by the fit again McGibbon. He regained the number 9 shirt in December when McGibbon was sold to Fulham and went on to score 11 goals in the remaining 23 games.

In the FA Cup third round match against Bury on 11 January 1947, Lewis scored a hat-trick in a 5–1 victory. This was the "Saints" first FA Cup hat-trick for 50 years, and the first-ever in the competition proper. In total he scored 15 goals, making him joint top-scorer with Jack Bradley.

Lewis was unable to reproduce this form in the 1947–48 season, failing to score in any of his 15 appearances. The arrival of Charlie Wayman in November brought Lewis's Saints career to an end. In his two years at Southampton, he scored 15 goals from 45 appearances.

=== Later career ===
Lewis spent the 1947–48 season back in the Third Division South with Brighton & Hove Albion before joining Dartford, where he remained until 1952, when he took up a position as groundsman.
