= Alf Freeman (footballer, born 1920) =

English footballer (1920-2006)

Personal information
- Full name: Alfred Freeman
- Date of birth: 2 January 1920
- Place of birth: Bethnal Green, England
- Date of death: February 2006 (aged 86)
- Place of death: London, England
- Height: 5 ft 7 in (1.70 m)
- Position: Inside right

Youth career
- 1939: Tottenham Hotspur

Senior career*
Years	Team	Apps	(Gls)
1943–1948	Southampton	7	(2)
1948–1949	Crystal Palace	1	(0)
1949–1950	Reading	0	(0)
1954–19??	Canterbury City		
- * Club domestic league appearances and goals

Alfred Freeman (2 January 1920 – February 2006) was an English footballer who played as an inside-forward for Southampton and Crystal Palace in the late 1940s.

== Football career ==
Freeman was born in Bethnal Green and joined Tottenham Hotspur as a trainee in 1939 but, before he could establish himself, the outbreak of the Second World War brought normal football to a temporary halt.

He enlisted with the Duke of Cornwall's Light Infantry and saw service in Normandy. While playing football for the army, he met Alf Ramsey and the two became good friends. In his autobiography, "Talking Football" published in 1952, Ramsey credits Freeman with encouraging him to "think tactically" – while this advice may have helped Ramsey to success in his future career as manager of Ipswich Town and England, Freeman's career was not so successful.

Freeman joined Southampton in November 1943, while continuing to serve with his army regiment. At Southampton, he was re-united with his friend, Alf Ramsey, who had signed for the club shortly before, and the two shared accommodation. Although registered as a Southampton player from November 1943, he made only one appearance in a wartime league match and it was not until the summer of 1946 that he was able to take up football full-time, having guested for Sunderland in the meantime.

Freeman made his professional debut in the Southampton reserves on 31 August 1946, followed by his first-team debut four days later at inside-right in the opening match of the 1946–47 season, a Football League Second Division match at Swansea Town. Freeman was used mainly as cover for Ted Bates, who was frequently unavailable while completing his military service, and missed the next two league matches before returning in place of Bates, scoring twice in a 5–2 victory over Nottingham Forest on 14 September. Despite this, Freeman lost his place to Bates after the next match and played only seven first-team matches in 1946–47.

Having made 21 reserve-team appearances (scoring eight goals) in 1946–47, Freeman spent the entire 1947–48 season in the reserves, with the newly signed George Curtis now the first-team inside-right. Freeman made 33 appearances for the reserves in 1947–48, scoring seven goals, and was released at the end of the season.

In August 1948, he joined Crystal Palace, for whom he made two first-team appearances, including one in the Football League Third Division South against Reading. Despite Palace finishing at the bottom of the league, Freeman was unable to break into the side and was transferred to Reading in the summer of 1949. He made no first-team appearances for Reading and retired the following year.

== Later career ==
Freeman went into business, manufacturing cardboard cartons and lived in Hendon from where he regularly attended matches at both White Hart Lane and Highbury.
