= Jackie Wood =

English footballer (1919–1993)

Personal information
- Full name: Edward John Wood
- Date of birth: 23 October 1919
- Place of birth: Canning Town, London
- Date of death: October 1993 (aged 73–74)
- Place of death: Exeter, England
- Positions: Outside left; inside forward

Senior career*
Years	Team	Apps	(Gls)
–1937	Leytonstone		
1937–1949	West Ham United	58	(13)
1949–1950	Leyton Orient	10	(1)
1950–1952	Margate	80	(31)

International career
1937	England Amateur	1	
- * Club domestic league appearances and goals

Edward John Wood (23 October 1919 – October 1993) was an English footballer who played as an outside-left, and later in both inside-forward positions. He played in the Football League for West Ham United and Leyton Orient.

Wood played amateur football with Leytonstone, and once for England, before signing as a professional with West Ham United in 1937. His debut came with a 0–4 mauling of Manchester United in the Second Division on 23 February 1938. He made ten appearances for the Hammers in his first two seasons, but his three appearances and two goals in 1939–40 were subsequently struck from the record after the outbreak of World War II. He served as a Territorial with the Essex Regiment during the conflict.

After the war, and the resumption of football for the 1945–46 season, Wood made a further 48 appearances, scoring 13 goals, until his departure in 1949. His first goals for the club came with a brace against Arsenal in a 6–0 FA Cup win on 5 January 1946.

Wood joined east London neighbours Leyton Orient in October 1949. He made ten appearances in the League for Orient. He joined Kent League club Margate the following season.
