= Walter Bennett (footballer, born 1918) =

English footballer

Personal information
- Full name: Walter Bennett
- Date of birth: 15 December 1918
- Place of birth: Mexborough, England
- Date of death: 2009 (aged 90–91)
- Position: Forward

Senior career*
Years	Team	Apps	(Gls)
1946–1948	Barnsley	38	(23)
1948–1950	Doncaster Rovers	39	(14)
1950–1951	Halifax Town	7	(1)
Total		84	(38)
- * Club domestic league appearances and goals

Walter Bennett (15 December 1918 – 2009) was an English footballer who played in the Football League for Barnsley, Doncaster Rovers and Halifax Town.
