= John Sherratt =

English footballer

Personal information
- Full name: John Hubert Sherratt
- Date of birth: 9 March 1923
- Place of birth: Stoke-on-Trent, England
- Date of death: 1975 (aged 51–52)
- Position: Centre-forward

Senior career*
Years	Team	Apps	(Gls)
1949	Port Vale	2	(0)
Total		2	(0)
- * Club domestic league appearances and goals

John Hubert Sherratt (9 March 1923 – 1975) was an English amateur footballer who played at centre-forward for Port Vale in 1949.

== Career ==
Sherratt joined Port Vale in January 1949 and made his debut in a 3–1 defeat by Swansea Town at Vetch Field on 5 March. He played just one more game in 1948–49, before being released by manager Gordon Hodgson in the summer.

== Career statistics ==
Appearances and goals by club, season and competition
Club	Season	League			FA Cup		Total	
Club	Season	Division	Apps	Goals	Apps	Goals	Apps	Goals
Port Vale	1948–49	Third Division South	2	0	0	0	2	0
Total			2	0	0	0	2	0
