= Arthur Farrell (footballer) =

English footballer

Personal information
- Date of birth: 1 November 1920
- Date of death: 20 September 2000 (aged 79)
- Place of death: Isle of Wight, England
- Position: Defender

Senior career*
Years	Team	Apps	(Gls)
- Bradford Park Avenue
- Barnsley
- Scarborough
- * Club domestic league appearances and goals

Arthur Farrell (1 November 1920 – 20 September 2000) was a professional footballer who played as a defender for Bradford Park Avenue, Barnsley and Scarborough.

He later moved to the Isle of Wight, where he died aged 79 after suffering from Parkinson's disease

Father of Robert, Geoff and Tony. Grandfather of the late Andrew, Susan, Alicia, Louise, Martin, Linzi and Katie

.[3]
