= George Ephgrave =

English footballer

Personal information
- Full name: George Arthur Ephgrave
- Date of birth: 29 April 1918
- Place of birth: Reading, Berkshire, England
- Date of death: 12 December 2004 (aged 86)
- Place of death: Castel, Guernsey
- Height: 6 ft 4 in (1.93 m)
- Position: Goalkeeper

Youth career
- Guernsey Rangers
- 1935–1936: Northfleet

Senior career*
Years	Team	Apps	(Gls)
1936–1939	Aston Villa	0	(0)
1939–1946	Swindon Town	1	(0)
1946–1948	Southampton	36	(0)
1948–1951	Norwich City	5	(0)
1951–1952	Watford	4	(0)
1952–1954	Deal Town		
1954–1955	March Town United		
- * Club domestic league appearances and goals

George Arthur Ephgrave (29 April 1918 – 12 December 2004) was an English footballer who played as a goalkeeper. Born in Reading, Ephgrave began his professional career with Aston Villa in 1936, and later played for a number of Football League clubs including Southampton and Norwich City before retiring from professional football in 1954.

== Life and career ==
Born in Reading but brought up in Guernsey, George Ephgrave began his youth football career with local side Guernsey Rangers, and was later signed by Tottenham Hotspur feeder club Northfleet in October 1935. A year later, Ephgrave signed a professional contract with recently relegated Second Division side Aston Villa, although he failed to make a single appearance in his three seasons at the club.

In March 1939, at the end of the last full season before the Second World War, the goalkeeper signed for Swindon Town, where he made his first appearance in the Football League. During the conflict, Ephgrave served his country in the Royal Marines, resulting in him being captured on Crete and held as a prisoner of war in Odessa, Ukraine for four years. On his return to England he was signed by Southampton, where he was used as the first-choice goalkeeper for the first season after the war. In the 1946–47 season he played in 29 of the 42 Second Division league games, as well as in both of the FA Cup games the Saints played, although in the following season he was second choice to Len Stansbridge and, later, Ian Black, making only seven league appearances in the first half of the campaign.

In July 1948 Ephgrave moved to Norwich City for a transfer fee of £500, where he made just five appearances in three seasons. He was later transferred to Watford in August 1951, playing just four times in his only season at the club, and ended his career with seasons at non-league sides Deal Town and March Town United.

After his retirement, Ephgrave moved back to Guernsey, and he died on 12 December 2004 at the age of 86.
