= Doug McGibbon =

English footballer (1919-2002)

Personal information
- Full name: Douglas McGibbon
- Date of birth: 24 February 1919
- Place of birth: Netley, England
- Date of death: 25 October 2002 (aged 83)
- Place of death: Aylesbury, England
- Height: 5 ft 10 in (1.78 m)
- Position: Centre forward

Youth career
- Air Service Training (Hamble)

Senior career*
| Years | Team | Apps | (Gls) |
| 1938–1947 | Southampton | 13 | (9) |
| 1947–1948 | Fulham | 42 | (18) |
| 1948–1951 | Bournemouth & Boscombe Athletic | 103 | (65) |
| 1951–???? | Lovells Athletic | | |
- * Club domestic league appearances and goals

Douglas McGibbon (24 February 1919 – 25 October 2002) was an English footballer who played at centre forward for Southampton, Fulham and Bournemouth & Boscombe Athletic in the years just after the Second World War. He once scored six goals in a match, one of which was timed at under 5 seconds from the second half kick-off.

== Football career ==
=== Southampton ===
McGibbon was born in Netley, Hampshire, the son of Charlie McGibbon (1880–1954), who was a centre forward for several clubs, including Southampton, in the 1900s. At the time Doug was born, his father had retired and was employed as the Chief Clerk in the Statistical Office at Netley Hospital.

Doug McGibbon played his youth football with the Air Service Training at Hamble. During a charity cricket match, he approached the Southampton manager Tom Parker for a trial. Parker gave McGibbon a game with the "Saints" "A" team, against Lymington, during which he scored a hat trick. This was sufficient to persuade Southampton to offer him a professional contract, which he signed in December 1938, going on to make his first-team debut in the final match of the 1938–39 season, replacing Reg Tomlinson in a 2–0 defeat at Plymouth.

McGibbon remained in Southampton at the start of the Second World War, making 16 appearances (scoring 7 goals) in the wartime leagues in 1939–40 before he moved to Swindon to work as an aircraft mechanic as part of the war effort. While at Swindon, he played for Swindon Railway in 1944 and then for Swindon Town in the 1945–46 season where he made five appearances, scoring three goals. Swindon Town approached Southampton with a view to signing him on a full-time basis, but the Saints board refused and McGibbon returned to Southampton.

During the 1945–46 season, Southampton played in the League South pending the resumption of League football following the end of the war. During the league season, McGibbon made 30 appearances scoring 27 goals, including six in a 7–0 victory over Chelsea on 29 December 1945. In this match, McGibbon scored his third goal within five seconds of the kick-off for the second half. McGibbon kicked off to Ted Bates, who passed the ball wide to Bill Stroud, who immediately hit a long ball into the path of McGibbon, who had sprinted upfield. McGibbon hit a firm volley into the back of the net without a Chelsea player having touched the ball. The referee timed the goal at 4.6 seconds from the kick-off – this remains the fastest goal ever scored by a Southampton player from a kick-off, although the Dell pitch had been shortened slightly due to bomb damage at the Milton Road end. In total, including FA Cup matches, McGibbon scored 29 goals from 34 appearances in 1945–46, although his form did tail off towards the end of the season.

McGibbon made his home League debut in the opening match of the first season of League football after the war, scoring a hat trick in a 4–0 victory over Swansea Town. He scored three more goals in the next five games, before an injury forced him to sit out five games, with George Lewis taking over. On McGibbon's return he continued to score regularly until he was dropped, in favour of Lewis, in December before manager Bill Dodgin sold him to Fulham for a fee of £4,250 at the start of January. In his 13 league games for the "Saints", McGibbon scored nine goals.

=== Fulham ===
McGibbon scored a hat-trick against Plymouth Argyle in his Fulham debut, becoming only the second Fulham player to achieve such a feat. He subsequently found goals harder to come by, scoring a total of 18 in 43 league appearances up to the end of the 1947–48 season when he was transferred to Bournemouth & Boscombe Athletic in September.

=== Bournemouth & Boscombe Athletic ===
At Bournemouth, playing in the Football League Third Division South, McGibbon again found his goal-scoring form and in each of his three seasons at Dean Court was the club's top scorer, with goal tallies of 30, 18 and 17 respectively.

== Later career ==
In the summer of 1951, McGibbon dropped out of League football, moving to Newport, Monmouthshire to play for Lovells Athletic in the Welsh League. His footballing days came to an abrupt end when he smashed his head following a collision with a cross bar.

After a spell in hospital, he returned to Hamble to work as an aircraft engineer and then as a sports officer. He later moved to Isleworth in Middlesex where he was sports secretary for Gillette before finishing his working life with Sperry Flight Systems in Basingstoke.

On his retirement, he initially settled in Isleworth before spending the last few years of his life in an Aylesbury care home, where he died in October 2002.
