= Bill Stroud =

English footballer (1919–2006)

Personal information
- Full name: William James Alfred Stroud
- Date of birth: 7 July 1919
- Place of birth: London, England
- Date of death: 5 October 2006 (aged 87)
- Place of death: Southampton, England
- Height: 5 ft 9 in (1.75 m)
- Position: Wing half

Youth career
- Regents Park School
- Highbury Sports
- 1938–1940: Southampton

Senior career*
Years	Team	Apps	(Gls)
1940–1947	Southampton	29	(4)
1947–1950	Leyton Orient	65	(1)
1950–1953	Newport County	63	(1)
1953–1954	Hastings United		
- * Club domestic league appearances and goals

William James Alfred Stroud (7 July 1919 – 5 October 2006) was a football player and coach who played as a wing half. Born in Hammersmith, Stroud played the first half of his professional career with Southampton, and later played for Leyton Orient, Newport County and Hastings United. He retired from professional football in 1954, after which he worked in coaching positions at former clubs Newport County and Southampton.

== Life and career ==
Stroud was a product of youth football in Hampshire, and eventually signed as a youth player at Southampton in May 1938 at the age of 18. He signed professional terms with the club in February 1940, and during the break from competitive football due to World War II made almost 200 appearances and converted from a forward to a wing half. Despite this lengthy allegiance to the Saints, Stroud spent only the first season after the war with the club in the Second Division, making 29 league appearances and scoring four goals, mainly from the right side of the half back line.

In June 1947 Stroud joined Leyton Orient as part of a deal which saw full back Ted Ballard taking his place in the Southampton squad. First-team league football was similarly available for the wing half at the London club, and Stroud made 65 league appearances for the team in three seasons. In June 1950 he moved up to Welsh side Newport County for three seasons, and later finished his playing career with Southern League side Hastings United.

After retiring from playing, Stroud returned to Newport County as coach of the reserves team, where he remained for nine years before returning to Southampton to work as youth team assistant coach. During his 24-year stint with the Southampton Academy, Stroud assisted in the development of such legendary Saints players as Mick Channon, Matthew Le Tissier and Alan Shearer, before retiring in 1987 after briefly working as the coach for a Hants Intermediate XI team.
