= 1950–51 Tottenham Hotspur F.C. season =

English football club season

Tottenham Hotspur
1950–51 season
- Chairman: Fred J. Bearman
- Manager: Arthur Rowe
- Stadium: White Hart Lane
- First Division: 1st
- FA Cup: Third round
- Top goalscorer: League: Sonny Walters (15); All: Sonny Walters (15)

The 1950–51 season saw Tottenham Hotspur follow their success of the previous season winning the Second Division to go on and win the First Division for the first time in their history. Spurs entered the FA Cup in the third round and were drawn away to Huddersfield Town, they lost 2–0.

== Squad ==
Note: Flags indicate national team as defined under FIFA eligibility rules; some limited exceptions apply. Players may hold more than one non-FIFA nationality.

Pos.	Nation	Player
GK	ENG	Ted Ditchburn
DF	ENG	Alf Ramsey
DF	ENG	Sid Tickridge
DF	ENG	Harry Clarke
DF	ENG	Arthur Willis
DF	ENG	Charlie Withers
MF	WAL	Ron Burgess (C)
MF	ENG	Colin Brittan
MF	ENG	Tony Marchi
MF	ENG	Les Medley

Pos.	Nation	Player
MF	ENG	Sonny Walters
MF	ENG	Bill Nicholson
FW	ENG	Sid McClellan
FW	ENG	Les Bennett
FW	ENG	Len Duquemin
FW	ENG	Eddie Baily
FW	ENG	Jimmy Scarth
FW	SCO	Alex Wright
FW	ENG	Peter Murphy
FW	ENG	Dennis Uphill

== Competitions ==
=== First Division ===
Pos	Team	Pld	W	D	L	GF	GA	GAv	Pts
1	Tottenham Hotspur (C)	42	25	10	7	82	44	1.864	60
2	Manchester United	42	24	8	10	74	40	1.850	56
3	Blackpool	42	20	10	12	79	53	1.491	50
4	Newcastle United	42	18	13	11	62	53	1.170	49
5	Arsenal	42	19	9	14	73	56	1.304	47

Source: World Football
Rules for classification: 1) Points; 2) Goal average; 3) Goals scored
(C) Champions

=== Fixtures ===
Tottenham were crowned champions after their penultimate game against Sheffield Wednesday which they won 1–0.

19 August 1950 1	Tottenham Hotspur	1–4	Blackpool	Tottenham, London
	Baily			Stadium: White Hart Lane; Attendance: 64,978

23 August 1950 2	Bolton	1–4	Tottenham Hotspur	Bolton
			Duqiemin; Medley; Peter Murphy; Walters	Stadium: Burnden Park; Attendance: 21,745

26 August 1950 3	Arsenal	2–2	Tottenham Hotspur	Highbury, London
				Stadium: Highbury Stadium; Attendance: 64638

30 August 1950 4	Tottenham Hotspur	4–2	Bolton	Tottenham, London
				Stadium: White Hart Lane; Attendance: 44256

2 September 1950 5	Charlton Athletic	1–1	Tottenham Hotspur	Charlton, London
				Stadium: The Valley; Attendance: 61480

6 September 1950 6	Liverpool	2–1	Tottenham Hotspur	Liverpool
				Stadium: Anfield; Attendance: 39015

9 September 1950 7	Tottenham Hotspur	1–0	Manchester United	Manchester
				Stadium: Old Trafford; Attendance: 60621

16 September 1950 8	Wolverhampton Wanderers	2–1	Tottenham Hotspur	Wolverhampton
				Stadium: Molineux Stadium; Attendance: 55364

23 September 1950 9	Tottenham Hotspur	1–1	Sunderland	Tottenham, London
				Stadium: White Hart Lane; Attendance: 59190

30 September 1950 10	Aston Villa	2–3	Tottenham Hotspur	Aston, Birmingham
				Stadium: Villa Park; Attendance: 36538

7 October 1950 11	Tottenham Hotspur	1–0	Burnley	Tottenham, London
				Stadium: White Hart Lane; Attendance: 46518

14 October 1950 12	Chelsea	0–2	Tottenham Hotspur	Fulham, London
				Stadium: Stamford Bridge; Attendance: 65992

21 October 1950 13	Tottenham Hotspur	6–1	Stoke City	Tottenham, London
				Stadium: White Hart Lane; Attendance: 54124

28 October 1950 14	West Bromwich Albion	1–2	Tottenham Hotspur	West Bromwich
				Stadium: The Hawthorns; Attendance: 44543

4 November 1950 15	Tottenham Hotspur	5–1	Portsmouth	Tottenham, London
				Stadium: White Hart Lane; Attendance: 66402

11 November 1950 16	Everton	1–2	Tottenham Hotspur	Liverpool
				Stadium: Goodison Park; Attendance: 47125

18 November 1950 17	Tottenham Hotspur	7–0	Newcastle United	Tottenham, London
				Stadium: White Hart Lane; Attendance: 70336

25 November 1950 18	Huddersfield Town	3–2	Tottenham Hotspur	Huddersfield
				Stadium: Leeds Road; Attendance: 36519

2 December 1950 19	Tottenham Hotspur	3–3	Middlesbrough	Tottenham, London
				Stadium: White Hart Lane; Attendance: 61148

9 December 1950 20	Sheffield Wednesday	1–1	Tottenham Hotspur	Owlerton, Sheffield
				Stadium: Hillsborough Stadium; Attendance: 44367

16 December 1950 21	Blackpool	0–1	Tottenham Hotspur	Blackpool
				Stadium: Bloomfield Road; Attendance: 22203

23 December 1950 22	Tottenham Hotspur	1–0	Arsenal	Tottenham, London
				Stadium: White Hart Lane; Attendance: 54898

25 December 1950 23	Derby County	1–1	Tottenham Hotspur	Derby
				Stadium: Baseball Ground; Attendance: 32301

26 December 1950 24	Tottenham Hotspur	2–1	Derby County	Tottenham, London
				Stadium: White Hart Lane; Attendance: 59885

30 December 1950 25	Tottenham Hotspur	1–0	Charlton Athletic	Tottenham, London
				Stadium: White Hart Lane; Attendance: 54667

13 January 1951 26	Manchester United	2–1	Tottenham Hotspur	Manchester
				Stadium: Old Trafford; Attendance: 45104

20 January 1951 27	Tottenham Hotspur	2–1	Wolverhampton Wanderers	Tottenham, London
				Stadium: White Hart Lane; Attendance: 66796

3 February 1951 28	Sunderland	0–0	Tottenham Hotspur	Roker, Sunderland
				Stadium: Roker Park; Attendance: 56817

17 February 1951 29	Tottenham Hotspur	3–2	Aston Villa	Tottenham, London
				Stadium: White Hart Lane; Attendance: 47842

24 February 1951 30	Burnley	2–0	Tottenham Hotspur	Burnley
				Stadium: Turf Moor; Attendance: 33048

3 March 1951 31	Tottenham Hotspur	2–1	Chelsea	Tottenham, London
				Stadium: White Hart Lane; Attendance: 59449

10 March 1951 32	Stoke City	0–0	Tottenham Hotspur	Stoke-on-Trent
				Stadium: Victoria Ground; Attendance: 26236

17 March 1951 33	Tottenham Hotspur	5–0	West Bromwich Albion	Tottenham, London
				Stadium: White Hart Lane; Attendance: 45353

23 March 1951 34	Fulham	0–1	Tottenham Hotspur	Fulham, London
				Stadium: Craven Cottage; Attendance: 47393

24 March 1951 35	Portsmouth	1–1	Tottenham Hotspur	Portsmouth
				Stadium: Fratton Park; Attendance: 49716

26 March 1951 36	Tottenham Hotspur	2–1	Fulham	Tottenham, London
				Stadium: White Hart Lane; Attendance: 51862

31 March 1951 37	Tottenham Hotspur	3–0	Everton	Tottenham, London
				Stadium: White Hart Lane; Attendance: 46651

7 April 1951 38	Newcastle United	0–1	Tottenham Hotspur	Newcastle upon Tyne
				Stadium: St James' Park; Attendance: 41241

14 April 1951 39	Tottenham Hotspur	1–2	Huddersfield Town	Tottenham, London
				Stadium: White Hart Lane; Attendance: 55014

21 April 1951 40	Middlesbrough	1–1	Tottenham Hotspur	Middlesbrough
				Stadium: Ayresome Park; Attendance: 36689

28 April 1951 41	Tottenham Hotspur	1–0	Sheffield Wednesday	Tottenham, London
	Len Duquemin			Stadium: White Hart Lane; Attendance: 46,645

5 May 1951 42	Tottenham Hotspur	3–1	Liverpool	Tottenham, London
				Stadium: White Hart Lane; Attendance: 49072

=== FA Cup ===
Source data:

6 January 1951	Huddersfield Town	2–0	Tottenham Hotspur	Huddersfield
				Stadium: Leeds Road; Attendance: 25,390

== Notes ==
- Game attendance data from: Tottenham Hotspur Official Handbook 2018–2019
