= Sonny Walters =

English footballer

Personal information
- Date of birth: 5 September 1924
- Place of birth: Edmonton, London, England
- Date of death: 25 November 1970 (aged 46)
- Position: Winger

Senior career*
Years	Team	Apps	(Gls)
1946–1956	Tottenham Hotspur	210	(66)
1957–1959	Aldershot	66	(11)
Total		276	(77)
- * Club domestic league appearances and goals

William E. "Sonny" Walters (5 September 1924 – 25 November 1970) was an English professional footballer who played on the wing for Tottenham Hotspur and subsequently for Aldershot Town during the 1940s and 1950s.

== Career ==
Sonny Walters was assigned to Tottenham Juniors in 1939, representing the Walthamstow Avenue team and netting 24 goals during the 1943–44 season. He signed professional forms in September 1944, clocking up 50 wartime appearances, netting 14 goals, until serving in the army from 1945 to 1947. Whilst based in Northern Ireland he guested for Derry City as well as facing the French Army, Belgian Army, RAF and Royal Navy in representative matches.

He played for Tottenham Hotspur between 1947 and 1957 and in 1949 he gained a regular spot in the Tottenham Hotspur league team. He got his break when he was selected to replace Freddie Cox who transferred to Arsenal and was quick to make an impression. Scoring on his debut in January 1947 in a 2-0 victory over West Bromwich Albion at White Hart Lane. He was a key part of manager Arthur Rowe's exciting 'Push and Run' side which won the Football League Second Division in 1950 and, in the year following promotion, the Football League First Division in 1951.

The nucleus of the team included captain Ronnie Burgess, goalkeeper Ted Ditchburn, Bill Nicholson, Alf Ramsey, Les Medley, Les Bennett, Eddie Baily, Len Duquemin and Walters himself. Walters was top scorer as Tottenham won the first division.

During his time at Spurs he made 234 appearances scoring 71 goals. On 24 January 1953 Sonny scored the club's 1,500th League goal at White Hart Lane in a 2–1 win against Sheffield Wednesday.

His name was immortalised in the 1950s Spurs chant "We are the Spurs Supporters and we love to watch them play" (sung to the tune of McNamara's Band) with the lines...... The ref his whistle proudly blows the linesmen wave their flags, The Duke is ready to kick off as he hitches up his bags, We cheer Sonny Walters as he toddles down the line, And the ball like magic is in the net and makes us all feel fine.

In July 1957 he transferred to Aldershot Town where he played 66 times scoring 11 goals.

He gained only one international honour when selected to play for England "B" against The Netherlands at Newcastle on 22 February 1950.

He retired from the game in 1959.

== Honours ==
Tottenham Hotspur

- Football League First Division: 1950–51
