= Arthur Rowe (footballer) =

English footballer (1906–1993)

Personal information
- Full name: Arthur Sydney Rowe
- Date of birth: 1 September 1906
- Place of birth: Tottenham, England
- Date of death: 5 November 1993 (aged 87)
- Place of death: Wallington, England
- Position: Centre half

Youth career
- Northfleet United
- Cheshunt
- Tottenham Hotspur

Senior career*
Years	Team	Apps	(Gls)
1929–1939	Tottenham Hotspur	182	(0)

International career
1933	England	1	(0)

Managerial career
- 1945–1949: Chelmsford City
- 1949–1955: Tottenham Hotspur
- 1960–1962: Crystal Palace
- 1966: Crystal Palace (caretaker)
- * Club domestic league appearances and goals

Arthur Sydney Rowe (1 September 1906 – 5 November 1993) was an English footballer, and later manager, who played as a centre half in the 1930s.

== Playing career ==
Rowe was born in Tottenham and began his career at Tottenham Hotspur's nursery club Northfleet United as an amateur in 1923, before becoming a professional with "Spurs" in 1929. He also appeared as an amateur for Cheshunt in 1920. He was a Tottenham player for eight seasons, after making his debut in 1931, in which time he played 201 games, in all competitions, and earned his single cap for the England team. He was forced to retire in 1939 due to a cartilage injury.

== Managerial career ==
=== Chelmsford City ===
After finishing his career as a player, Rowe took a coaching job in Hungary although this was halted due to the outbreak of World War II. He returned to Britain and joined the military as a physical training instructor. He joined Chelmsford City, as secretary-manager, in 1945 and made the club into a leading non-league team.

=== Tottenham Hotspur ===
Tottenham Hotspur were in the second division when Rowe returned to the club as manager in 1949 and his task was to gain promotion. This was achieved by becoming Champions and the following season the First Division Championship was won as well. These back-to-back championships made Spurs the first post-war team to win back-to-back titles. This was achieved through the use of 'Push and run' football, a tactic which involved quickly laying the ball off to a teammate and running past the marking tackler to collect the return pass.

The nucleus of the team included captain Ronnie Burgess, goalkeeper Ted Ditchburn, Harry Clark, Charlie Withers, Bill Nicholson, Alf Ramsey, Les Medley, Les Bennett, Eddie Baily, Len Duquemin and Sonny Walters.

Rowe was forced to resign as Tottenham manager in 1955 due to health issues.

=== Crystal Palace ===
After leaving Tottenham, Rowe took time off to recover and joined Crystal Palace in November 1958 as an assistant to George Smith. He was promoted to manager when Smith resigned in April 1960 bringing the club a promotion to Division Three in the 1960–61 season. The club consolidated its position in Division Three in 1961–62, but a poor start to the next season coincided with failing health for Rowe and he resigned in December 1962 to be replaced by assistant manager Dick Graham. Rowe returned to assist Graham in the 1963–64 season (when Palace was promoted to Division Two) and when Graham was dismissed by Palace in 1966, Rowe was appointed caretaker-manager. After Bert Head was appointed as manager later in 1966, Rowe continued with Palace in a scouting capacity. He subsequently managed the Hall of Fame in London and also assisted Leyton Orient briefly in 1972.

Rowe died on 5 November 1993 in Wallington, aged 87.

== Career statistics ==
=== International ===
Appearances and goals by national team and year
National team	Year	Apps	Goals
England	1933	1	0
Total		1	0

== Honours ==
=== As a manager ===
Tottenham Hotspur

- Football League First Division: 1950–51
- Football League Second Division: 1949–50
- FA Charity Shield: 1951

== See also ==
- List of English football championship winning managers
