= Eddie Baily =

English footballer (1925–2010)

Personal information
- Full name: Edward Francis Baily
- Date of birth: 6 August 1925
- Place of birth: Clapton, London, England
- Date of death: 13 October 2010 (aged 85)
- Place of death: Welwyn Garden City, Hertfordshire, England
- Height: 5 ft 7 in (1.70 m)
- Position: Inside forward

Youth career
- 1938–1946: Tottenham Hotspur

Senior career*
Years	Team	Apps	(Gls)
1946–1956	Tottenham Hotspur	296	(64)
1956	Port Vale	26	(8)
1956–1958	Nottingham Forest	68	(14)
1958–1960	Leyton Orient	29	(3)
Total		419	(89)

International career
1950–1952	England	9	(5)
	England "B"	3	(1)
	The Football League XI	6	(2)

Managerial career
- 1963–1974: Tottenham Hotspur (assistant)
- * Club domestic league appearances and goals

Edward Francis Baily (6 August 1925 – 13 October 2010) was an England international footballer. He was a 1950 FIFA World Cup squad member and scored five goals in nine international games. He was described as one of his generation's best inside forwards.

At club level, he played for Tottenham Hotspur from 1946 to 1956, helping the club to win the Second Division title in 1949–50, and then the First Division title in 1950–51; "Spurs" also finished as First Division runners-up in 1951–52. He scored 69 goals for the club in 325 games. In January 1956, he signed for Port Vale for a £7,000 fee, though he was then sold to Nottingham Forest for the same fee ten months later after he was criticized for being too much of 'an individualist'. He was a success at Forest, helping the club to win promotion to the top flight in 1956–57. He moved on to Leyton Orient in 1958 before retiring in 1960. He was then assistant to "Spurs" manager Bill Nicholson from 1963 to 1974.

== Early and personal life ==
Edward Francis Baily was born on 6 August 1925 in Clapton, London. He died on 13 October 2010 at Welwyn Garden City after a short illness. He was survived by wife, Elsie (married December 1952), son, Graham and daughter, Jane.

== Playing career ==
=== Club career ===
Baily joined Tottenham Hotspur as a 14-year-old in 1938, succeeding in the club's youth set-up. He played cricket for the Essex County Cricket Club Second XI and found work at a printing company and a stock brokerage firm. During World War II, he served with the Royal Scots Fusiliers and saw service in Belgium, the Netherlands and Germany. After the war he signed with Chelsea, but quickly left Stamford Bridge for Tottenham Hotspur after a chance encounter with Jimmy Anderson.

He debuted as an amateur on 19 January 1947 against West Bromwich Albion. His footballing skills flourished under new manager Arthur Rowe who was developing his push and run side which at the time was challenging for promotion to the First Division. He formed a good understanding with Les Medley on the left, and was a key player in the side that won the Second Division title in 1949–50. "Spurs" continued to win games, and were crowned champions of England in 1950–51, finishing four points ahead of second place Manchester United. In 1951–52, the situation reversed, as "Spurs" finished runners-up, four points behind United. On 2 April 1952, in a match against Huddersfield Town at White Hart Lane, Baily caused controversy after he took a corner kick by hitting the ball against the referee, before crossing it into the box for Len Duquemin to score the winning goal. After a tenth-place finish in 1952–53, Tottenham continued to slide down the table, and battled just above the relegation zone in 1954–55 and 1955–56. During his time at "Spurs", Baily made 325 appearances in the league and FA Cup, scoring 69 goals.

In January 1956, he was transferred to Freddie Steele's Port Vale for a then-club record fee of £7,000. He scored during a 'grand' debut in a 3–1 home win over Notts County on 14 January 1956. He scored eight goals in 27 games for the club, adding 'master touches' to the "Valiants" play, but was sold to Nottingham Forest in October 1956 for £7,000 because he was 'an individualist' who left the rest of the Vale attackers 'confused'.

He helped Billy Walker's side to win promotion out of the Second Division in 1956–57 and showed the Vale what they had let go when he returned to Vale Park on 2 February to mastermind a 7–1 win. Forest finished tenth in the top-flight in 1957–58, and Baily left the City Ground having scored 14 goals in 68 league games for the club. He returned to the Second Division in December 1958 after signing with Alec Stock's Leyton Orient, playing 29 league games for Orient in 1958–59 and 1959–60, scoring three goals.

=== International career ===
On 2 July 1950, Baily won his first cap for England against Spain in the World Cup finals in Brazil. He went on to play in nine international games between 1950 and 1952, scoring five goals. He played against Spain, Yugoslavia, Northern Ireland (twice), Wales (twice), Austria (twice), and Switzerland. He also won three caps for the England "B" team and represented the Football League six times.

=== Style of play ===
He was described in The Guardian as "the quintessential cheeky Cockney, a dazzling technician, a razor-sharp passer of the ball, excitingly quick in thought and movement, one of the best inside-forwards of his era".

== Coaching career ==
In October 1963 he returned to Tottenham Hotspur to become the assistant manager under Bill Nicholson, and remained with him until Nicholson departed in August 1974, Baily also quit White Hart Lane the following month. He was described as a "stern taskmaster".

He scouted for Chelsea and was also a P.E. teacher at Bishop Stopford's School at Enfield before joining West Ham United as chief scout. He was responsible for bringing, among others, future West Ham and England player, Alan Devonshire to Upton Park. Following 16 years of service, he had a testimonial match in 1993 between "Spurs" and Enfield on the day that Alan Sugar sacked Terry Venables as manager of "Spurs", and a large crowd turned up to protest against the sacking.

== Career statistics ==
=== Club statistics ===
Appearances and goals by club, season and competition
Club	Season	League			FA Cup		Total	
Club	Season	Division	Apps	Goals	Apps	Goals	Apps	Goals
Tottenham Hotspur	1946–47	Second Division	1	0	0	0	1	0
Tottenham Hotspur	1947–48	Second Division	22	5	5	0	27	5
Tottenham Hotspur	1948–49	Second Division	41	11	0	0	41	11
Tottenham Hotspur	1949–50	Second Division	40	8	3	1	43	9
Tottenham Hotspur	1950–51	First Division	40	12	1	0	41	12
Tottenham Hotspur	1951–52	First Division	30	4	2	1	32	5
Tottenham Hotspur	1952–53	First Division	30	6	9	2	39	8
Tottenham Hotspur	1953–54	First Division	33	5	6	1	39	6
Tottenham Hotspur	1954–55	First Division	41	12	3	0	44	12
Tottenham Hotspur	1955–56	First Division	18	1	0	0	18	1
Tottenham Hotspur	Total		296	64	29	5	325	69
Port Vale	1955–56	Second Division	17	7	1	0	18	7
Port Vale	1956–57	Second Division	9	1	0	0	9	1
Port Vale	Total		26	8	1	0	27	8
Nottingham Forest	1956–57	Second Division	27	6	5	3	32	9
Nottingham Forest	1957–58	First Division	37	8	3	0	40	8
Nottingham Forest	1958–59	First Division	4	0	0	0	4	0
Nottingham Forest	Total		68	14	8	3	76	17
Leyton Orient	1958–59	Second Division	18	3	1	0	19	3
Leyton Orient	1959–60	Second Division	11	0	0	0	11	0
Leyton Orient	Total		29	3	1	0	30	3
Career total			419	89	39	8	458	97

=== International statistics ===
England national team
Year	Apps	Goals
1950	4	4
1951	2	1
1952	3	0
Total	9	5

== Honours ==
Tottenham Hotspur

- Football League First Division: 1950–51
- Football League Second Division: 1949–50

England

- British Home Championship: 1951–52 (shared), 1952–53
