= Percy Smith (English footballer) =

English footballer and manager

Personal information
- Full name: Percy James Smith
- Date of birth: 1880
- Place of birth: Burbage, Hinckley, England
- Date of death: 18 April 1959 (aged 78–79)
- Place of death: Watford, England
- Position: Centre half

Senior career*
Years	Team	Apps	(Gls)
1895–	Hinckley Town	24	(9)
1902–1910	Preston North End	240	(94)
1910–1920	Blackburn Rovers	172	(5)
1920–1921	Fleetwood	31	(32)
1921–1922	Barrow	5	(0)
Total		472	(140)

Managerial career
- 1925–1927: Nelson
- 1927–1930: Bury
- 1930–1935: Tottenham Hotspur
- 1935–1936: Notts County
- 1936–1937: Bristol Rovers
- * Club domestic league appearances and goals

Percy James Smith (1880–1959) was an English footballer and football manager, who played for Preston North End and Blackburn Rovers.

== Playing career ==
He started his playing career with Hinckley Town before joining Preston in 1902. He quickly achieved success, helping Preston to the Second Division title in 1904, becoming the division's top scorer in the process with 26 goals, and to the runners-up position in the Football League in 1906.

After eight seasons at Preston, he moved to local rivals Blackburn Rovers in 1910, where he again achieved success claiming the League title in 1912 and again in 1914, as well as reaching the FA Cup Semi-finals in 1911 and 1912.

After World War I, he finished his playing career with brief spells at Fleetwood and Barrow.

== Management career ==
After retiring from playing, Smith managed Nelson, Bury, Tottenham Hotspur, Notts County and Bristol Rovers.

Smith became manager of Spurs in 1930. At Spurs he achieved modest success, guiding the team to the runners-up position in Division Two in 1933, thereby gaining promotion to the First Division. The team finished third place in the First Division in 1934. In the following season, injuries to players such as Willie Hall, and Arthur Rowe left the team weakened and at the bottom of the table by April 1935. Smith then resigned, claiming that the club's directors had interfered with his team selection.

== Honours ==
=== As a player ===
Preston North End

- Second Division champions: 1904
- Football League runners-up: 1906

Blackburn Rovers

- Football League champions: 1912 and 1914

=== As a manager ===
Tottenham Hotspur

- Second Division runners-up: 1933
