= Jimmy Anderson (football manager) =

English football manager

Managerial career
- Years: Team
- 1955–1958: Tottenham Hotspur

Jimmy Anderson was an English football manager for Tottenham Hotspur between 1955 and 1958.

== Career ==
Jimmy Anderson had been a lifelong member of the ground staff at Tottenham Hotspur. He first joined the club in 1908 as a ground-staff boy, failed to make the grade as a player, then worked in various positions at the club, including as part of the training and coaching staff. At the age of 62 he took over as manager from Arthur Rowe, who had retired on 18 April 1955. Indeed, during the latter period of Rowe's reign he had been appointed as acting manager due to his predecessor's ill-health.

After a poor season in 1955, Spurs finished second and then third in the Football League First Division in successive years. They also reached an FA Cup semi-final in 1956. Under Anderson, however, the team's overall performance (played 153, won 72 drew 32 and lost 49) was not considered good enough for the ambitious directors and supporters of the club who were wanting nothing short of a First Division Championship title.

This expectation put considerable pressure on Anderson, who was already in his mid-sixties and also suffering ill-health. This plus a very public falling out with his captain, Danny Blanchflower, with whom he had not always seen eye-to-eye, led ultimately to his retirement on 11 October 1958.

Many associated with the club saw Anderson as a 'stop-gap' manager, giving time for Bill Nicholson, who had always been seen as Rowe's chosen successor, to progress from player to manager. Indeed, during most of the time Anderson was manager, Nicholson had been developing his skills in the capacity of first team coach and in many contemporaries' eyes was the main influence both on and off the field.
