= Jack Jull =

English footballer

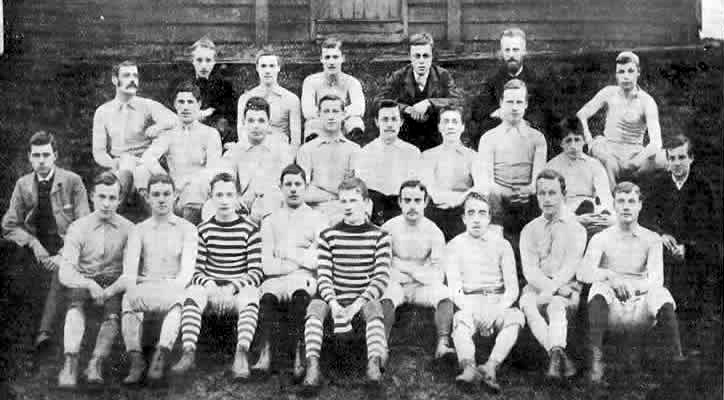
Spurs team in 1885, team captain Jack Jull middle row fourth left

Jack C. Jull (died 1920) was an English amateur footballer. He was one of the founding members of Hotspur Football Club later to become Tottenham Hotspur and one of those most influential in the club's development during the 1880s and 1890s.

== Career ==
According to the club's website, Jull "was regarded as one of its finest players of the late Victorian era". He usually played for the team at full-back. It is also recorded that in his earlier days with the club, and in particular during 1882 he was still at the time attending boarding school so was not always available for fixtures.

Despite his early absences, Jack's career was one of 'firsts'. He made his first appearance against Brownlow Rovers on 6 October 1883, which Spurs won 9–0, and was the first game of the club to be reported in a local newspaper, The Tottenham and Edmonton Weekly Herald. Jack played in the club's first London Association Cup tie, which they won 5–2 on 17 October 1885. The game was against a team called St. Albans at the time a well-known London-based 'Beer House' team. He was the first Spurs player to receive representative honours when he played for a Middlesex team in 1891. Jull was also in Tottenham's first League game in 1892, and its first FA Amateur Cup match in 1893. In 1894 he was in the team which contested the 1st Qualifying Round tie of the FA Cup against a West Herts side which was later to become Watford. Spurs won the game 3–2 and progressed by successively beating Wolverton and Claption Orient, today known as Leyton Orient. In the 4th Qualifying Round they were knocked out by Luton Town in a replay. 1894 was also the year Jack also scored his last goal for Spurs when he scored the second goal in a 2–2 draw away to Chesham on 27 January that year.

He was made Club President in 1895 and continued playing until 1897 by which time he had made 159 appearances for Tottenham (scoring 24 goals). As a measure of the esteem he was held in Jack, on his retirement as club captain in 1896 he was made an honorary life member of the club which he held until his death in 1920.
