= Sid McClellan =

English footballer

Personal information
- Full name: Sidney Benjamin McClellan
- Date of birth: 11 June 1925
- Place of birth: Bromley-by-Bow, London, England
- Date of death: 16 December 2000 (aged 75)
- Position: Inside forward

Senior career*
Years	Team	Apps	(Gls)
1949–1955	Tottenham Hotspur	68	(29)
1956–1957	Portsmouth	37	(9)
1958–1958	Leyton Orient	12	(4)
- * Club domestic league appearances and goals

Sidney Benjamin McClellan (11 June 1925 – 16 December 2000) was a professional footballer who played for Chelmsford City, Tottenham Hotspur, Portsmouth and Leyton Orient.

== Football career ==
McClellan joined Spurs from Chelmsford City in August 1949. A speedy, free-scoring inside forward he made his debut on 23 September 1950 against Sunderland. He was a member of the push and run side which won the 1950-51 Football League. McClellan played a total of 70 games and scored on 32 occasions in all competitions for the club. He joined Portsmouth in a £5,000 deal in November 1956 and featured in 37 Football League matches and scoring nine goals. McClellan ended his playing career at Leyton Orient, where he went on to make 12 appearances and score on four occasions. After retiring as a player he was the coach for the successful non-league side Dagenham and took them to the 1969-70 FA Amateur Cup Final.
