= Charlie Withers =

English footballer

Personal information
- Full name: Charles Francis Withers
- Date of birth: 6 September 1922
- Place of birth: Edmonton, England
- Date of death: 7 June 2005 (aged 82)
- Position: Full back

Senior career*
Years	Team	Apps	(Gls)
1947–1955	Tottenham Hotspur	153	(0)
1958–1959	Boston United	46	(0)
- * Club domestic league appearances and goals

Charles Francis Withers (6 September 1922 – 7 June 2005) was an English professional footballer who played for Tottenham Hotspur, Boston United and represented the England B team.

== Football career ==
Withers joined the Spurs as a junior and signed as a professional in October 1947. He played in the position of full back and completed 164 games and scored ten times in all competitions between 1947 and 1955. An integral member of the push and run Championship winning side of 1950–51 when he featured in 39 games. On leaving Spurs, Withers transferred to Boston United.

== Honours ==
Tottenham Hotspur

Football League First Division Winners: 1950–51
