= Harry Clarke (footballer, born 1923) =

English footballer

Personal information
- Full name: Henry Alfred Clarke
- Date of birth: 23 February 1923
- Place of birth: Woodford, England
- Date of death: 16 April 2000 (aged 77)
- Position: Full back

Senior career*
Years	Team	Apps	(Gls)
1945-1949	Lovell's Athletic		
1949–1956	Tottenham Hotspur	295	(4)

International career
1954	England	1	(0)

Managerial career
- 1959-62: Llanelli
- 1962-74: Romford
- * Club domestic league appearances and goals

Henry Alfred Clarke (23 February 1923 – 16 April 2000) was a professional footballer who spent his entire senior career at Tottenham Hotspur. He also represented England on one occasion.

== Football career ==
Clarke played with the RAF during his war service, and found work at the Lovell's confectionary factory in Newport after the war. He became a key figure in the factory's works team, Lovell's Athletic, playing in the 1947-48 season when the club did the Welsh League and Welsh Cup 'double'. At the end of this season the club applied to join the Football League but were unsuccessful. Had Lovell's Athletic joined the Football League, maybe they could have held onto Clarke whose reputation had now grown to attract First Division sides.

He joined Spurs in March 1949 from Lovells Athletic. He played a total of 322 matches at centre half and netting four goals in all competitions between 1949 and 1956. A cornerstone of the push and run side of the early 1950s when he featured in all 42 matches of the Championship winning side of 1950–51. After retiring from competitive football, Clarke joined the club's coaching staff.

Clarke made his only appearance for England on 4 April 1954, against Scotland at Hampden Park in the 1953–54 British Home Championship. The match also served as a 1954 FIFA World Cup qualification tie.

Clarke later managed Llanelli (1959-62) and Romford (1962-74).
