= Ted Ditchburn =

English footballer (1921–2005)

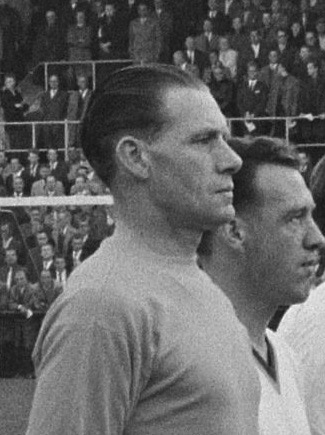
- Ditchburn in 1963

Personal information
- Full name: Edwin George Ditchburn
- Date of birth: 24 October 1921
- Place of birth: Gillingham, England
- Date of death: 26 December 2005 (aged 84)
- Position: Goalkeeper

Senior career*
Years	Team	Apps	(Gls)
- Northfleet United
1939–1958	Tottenham Hotspur	418	(0)
1959–1965	Romford	147	(0)
- Brentwood Town

International career
1948–1956	England	6	(0)

Managerial career
- 1959–1962: Romford
- * Club domestic league appearances and goals

Edwin George Ditchburn (24 October 1921 – 26 December 2005) was an English professional football goalkeeper who played for Northfleet United, Tottenham Hotspur, Romford, Brentwood Town and represented England on six occasions at international level.

== Playing career ==
After working in a paper mill, Ditchburn, a son of a professional boxer joined the ground staff of Tottenham Hotspur in 1937. He signed professional forms for the White Hart Lane club in 1939 after a spell with the club's 'nursery' team Northfleet United. During World War II Ditchburn served with the RAF as a physical education instructor. He made his senior debut for the Spurs in a wartime league match against Chelsea on 25 May 1940. At this time he represented both the RAF and the Combined Services and guested at Aberdeen. At the end of the war the brave, muscular keeper returned to Tottenham and made his Football League debut in a 2–1 reverse against Birmingham City on 31 August 1946. He went on to play in an unbroken run of 247 matches between April 1948 and March 1954. An ever-present member of the side that won promotion as Division Two champions in 1949–50 and the First division league title the following year, he developed the 'short throw' that provided the starting block for Tottenham's famous push and run style of the early 1950s. A broken finger against Chelsea ended his career with Spurs in August 1958 after making 452 appearances in all competitions for the Lilywhites. In the following year he became player/manager of non-league Romford. Ditchburn gave up his manager role in 1962, but kept playing for the club till 1965 and featured in 147 matches for the Essex based club. He went on to join Brentwood Town where he ended his senior career.

== International and representative career ==
Ditchburn played his first international in an unofficial war time match in 1944. He earned six caps between 1948 and 1956, a time when the popular Frank Swift and other consistent keepers dominated between the posts. His first match was against Switzerland in 1948 and in the following year versus Sweden. Ditchburn was a member of the 1950 World Cup squad but did not play. In 1953 he was selected for a tour of United States as the reserve keeper and played in the 6–3 victory over the home side. Following outstanding form with Tottenham Hotspur at the age of 35 he was recalled to the national team and played in a further three internationals in 1956. In addition, Ditchburn gained two England B caps in matches against Holland in May 1949 and Switzerland in January 1950. He was a regular member of the Football League XI and the Football Combination XI.

Date	Venue	Opponent	Result	Competition
2 December 1948	Highbury Stadium, London	Switzerland	6–0	Friendly
13 May 1949	Råsunda Stadium, Stockholm	Sweden	1–3	Friendly
8 June 1953	Polo Grounds, New York	United States	6–3	Friendly
14 November 1956	Wembley Stadium, London	Wales	3–1	British Home Championship
28 November 1956	Wembley Stadium, London	Yugoslavia	3–0	Friendly
5 December 1956	Molineux Stadium, Wolverhampton	Denmark	5–2	1958 World Cup qualifier

== Post–football career ==
After his football career ended he established a toy shop, a sports outfitters and was involved in an office equipment venture. A keen cricketer and tennis player. He retired and settled in Romford and died on 26 December 2005.

== Honours ==
Tottenham Hotspur

- Football League First Division: 1950–51
- Football League Second Division: 1949–50
