= Len Duquemin =

Footballer (1924–2003)

Personal information
- Full name: Leonard Stanley Duquemin
- Date of birth: 17 July 1924
- Place of birth: Cobo, Guernsey
- Date of death: 20 April 2003 (aged 78)
- Place of death: Buckhurst Hill, England
- Position: Forward

Senior career*
Years	Team	Apps	(Gls)
- Vauxbelet
1946	Colchester United	1	(0)
1946–1957	Tottenham Hotspur	274	(114)
1946	→ Chelmsford City (loan)	0	(0)
1958–1960	Bedford Town	64	(52)
1960–1961	Hastings United		
1961–1962	Romford	8	(4)
- * Club domestic league appearances and goals

Leonard Stanley Duquemin (17 July 1924 – 20 April 2003) was a British professional footballer best known as a player for Tottenham Hotspur. Nicknamed The Duke, he made his debut for Spurs in March 1946, and was a key member of Arthur Rowe's successful "push and run" side that won the league title in 1951.

== Career ==
Born in Cobo, Guernsey, Duquemin was the first famous footballer to come from the Channel Islands. During the German occupation of the Channel Islands during World War II he played for champions Vauxbelets Old Boys Association, when games were permitted by the German occupiers. He made a single appearance for Colchester United in 1946.

He scored on his Spurs debut in a 5–1 victory over Sheffield Wednesday at White Hart Lane in August 1947 in the old Second Division. Over the next ten years he made 307 appearances for Tottenham Hotspur and scored 134 goals. He won the League Championship in 1951 having won the Second Division title the year before. Known as 'Reliable Len' for his hard work rather than for being a stylish player, his value was seen in his ability to create space for some of his more renowned teammates. He became a key member of Arthur Rowe's famous 'push and run' side which transformed the style of football played in the Post War period. He played alongside Alf Ramsey and Bill Nicholson

Duquemin made his last league appearance for Tottenham in the 1956–57 season. He played just one match, though it brought him the last of his goals for the club. He subsequently spent four seasons in non-league football, first with Bedford Town F.C., with whom he won a Southern League Championship medal in the 1958–59 season, then with Hastings United and Romford. He left the game in 1962.

After his retirement he ran a newsagents shop close to White Hart Lane in Northumberland Park and later became the landlord at the Haunch of Venison public house in Cheshunt, Hertfordshire.

== Honours ==
Tottenham Hotspur

- Football League First Division: 1950–51
- Football League Second Division: 1949–50

Bedford Town

- Southern Football League: 1958–59
