= Les Bennett =

English footballer

Personal information
- Full name: Leslie Donald Bennett
- Date of birth: 10 January 1918
- Place of birth: Wood Green, England
- Date of death: 29 April 1999 (aged 81)
- Place of death: Hackney, England
- Position: Inside forward

Senior career*
Years	Team	Apps	(Gls)
1946–1954	Tottenham Hotspur	272	(104)
1954–1955	West Ham United	26	(3)
1956	Clacton Town	?	(?)
1959–1960	Romford	3	(0)
- * Club domestic league appearances and goals

Leslie Donald Bennett (10 January 1918 – 29 April 1999) was an English professional footballer who played as an inside forward for Tottenham Hotspur and West Ham United.

== Football career ==
Bennett joined Tottenham as a junior in May 1939. He spent much of the Second World War years serving his country with the Devon Regiment in Burma, India and Egypt, before making his Football League debut against Birmingham City on 31 August 1946. The quick- thinking, energetic inside forward was an important part of the push and run side of the 1950s. He made 294 appearances and scored on 124 occasions in all competitions for the club between 1946 and 1954. Bennett transferred to West Ham in December 1954 playing another 26 matches and scoring three goals. In August 1956 he became player–coach for Clacton before finishing his football career at Romford in 1959–60.

== Honours ==
Tottenham Hotspur

- Football League Second Division winner: 1949–50
- Football League First Division winner: 1950–51
- Football League First Division runner-up: 1951–52

== Post-football career ==
Bennett managed a caravan site in Clacton and was employed as a security guard at the University of Essex before retiring. He came out of retirement in 1964 to play in a "Push and Run" XI for the John White memorial fund.
