= Ron Burgess (footballer) =

Welsh footballer (1917–2005)

Personal information
- Full name: Ronald Burgess
- Date of birth: 9 April 1917
- Place of birth: Cwm, Ebbw Vale, Wales
- Date of death: 14 February 2005 (aged 87)
- Place of death: Swansea, Wales
- Position: Left half

Youth career
- Cwm Villa

Senior career*
Years	Team	Apps	(Gls)
1938–1954	Tottenham Hotspur	297	(14)
1954–1956	Swansea Town	47	(1)
Total		344	(15)

International career
1946–1954	Wales	32	(1)

Managerial career
- 1955–1958: Swansea Town
- 1959–1963: Watford
- 1963–1965: Hendon
- 1966–1967: Bedford Town
- Harrow Borough
- * Club domestic league appearances and goals

William Arthur Ronald Burgess (9 April 1917 – 14 February 2005) was a Welsh international footballer, who played in the wing half position.

== Playing career ==
Cardiff took Burgess on as a teenager, but chose not to sign him, so he worked as a miner for a while, and played inside-right for his local team Cwm Villa. He scored 59 goals in one season, which attracted the attention of the chief scout of Tottenham Hotspur. He was invited to join the club as an unpaid junior, but found him a job as a metal worker in Chingford. In 1937, Tottenham decided to release him, although before he left for home, he played in a junior match and scored twice, which changed the mind of the club's manager Jack Tresadern, and he was then invited to join the Tottenham nursery club at Northfleet where he played with Bill Nicholson while working as a groundstaff boy at Tottenham. He later joined the Tottenham reserves, then started in the first team in 1939 when league football was interrupted by the Second World War.

After the war ended and normal football resumed, Burgess became a significant player at Tottenham. He went on to captain the league championship winning Spurs team of the 1951 season, the year after he had helped them win the Division 2 crown.

Burgess captained the Wales national football team and won 32 caps for his country as a left half. He also played for the Great Britain team against the Rest of Europe in 1947.

Burgess joined Swansea Town in 1954 as a player and played until 1956.

== Managerial career ==
Burgess took over as manager of Swansea Town from 1955 to 1958. He was then manager of Watford from 1959 to 1963, where he steered the club to its first-ever promotion in his first full season in charge, and nearly managed a second successive promotion the following year. However, Watford's league form and Burgess's popularity with the fans plummeted after he sold star player Cliff Holton, and he was sacked when the club were nearly relegated in 1963. He subsequently managed Hendon, leading them to win the Isthmian League and FA Amateur Cup double in 1964–65, after which he became a coach at Fulham.

Burgess also acted as caretaker manager of the Wales national team for one match in 1965 due to the unavailability of team manager Dave Bowen. He managed Bedford Town from early 1966 until shortly after Easter the following year. He later became manager of Harrow Borough, before becoming a scout at Luton Town. After leaving football, he worked in a warehouse, before moving to Worthing, West Sussex when he retired, and ultimately Swansea, in his native South Wales.

== Family ==
His nephew Clive Burgess was a Wales international rugby union player.
