= Les Medley =

English footballer

Personal information
- Full name: Leslie Dennis Medley
- Date of birth: 3 September 1920
- Place of birth: Edmonton, London, England
- Date of death: 22 February 2001 (aged 80)
- Place of death: London, Ontario, Canada
- Position: Left winger

Senior career*
Years	Team	Apps	(Gls)
1939–1953	Tottenham Hotspur	164	(46)
1953–1957	Toronto Ulster United		
1958–1961	Randfontein		
Total		164	(46)

International career
1950–1951	England	6	(1)
1951	Rest of the UK	1	(1)
- * Club domestic league appearances and goals

Leslie Dennis Medley (3 September 1920 – 22 February 2001) was an English footballer who played as a left winger.

Born in Edmonton, London, aged 11 he gained a scholarship place at the Latymer School in Edmonton. He played for the school team and was selected for the schoolboys' England eleven. Medley joined Tottenham Hotspur in 1939 and appeared as a guest player for West Ham United in World War II. Medley was a key man in the Tottenham Hotspur's famous 'push and run' side that won the First Division championship in 1950-51 having won the Second Division the season before, when Les was top scorer. He also won six England caps. He left London in 1953 and joined the Canadian champions Toronto Ulster United in the National Soccer League, joining Len Garwood his former Tottenham teammate.
