= 1950–51 Southampton F.C. season =

English football club season

Southampton F.C.
1950–51 season
- Chairman: Penn Barrow
- Manager: Sid Cann
- Stadium: The Dell
- Second Division: 12th
- FA Cup: Fourth round
- Top goalscorer: League: Eddy Brown (20); All: Eddy Brown (22)
- Highest home attendance: 27,306 v Preston North End (31 March 1951)
- Lowest home attendance: 13,922 v Chesterfield (28 April 1951)
- Average home league attendance: 21,770
- Biggest win: 5–1 v Grimsby Town (17 March 1951)
- Biggest defeat: 0–4 v Brentford (26 December 1950)
Home colours

The 1950–51 season was the 50th year of competitive football played by Southampton F.C., the club's 24th season as members of the Football League, and their 22nd playing in the Second Division. The Saints finished the campaign in 12th place in the league table, having gained 43 from a possible 84 points with 15 wins, 13 draws and 14 losses. The club also competed in the FA Cup, losing in the fourth round at First Division side Sunderland after a third round replay win over Notts County.

After another frustrating season in which they missed out on promotion only on goal average, Southampton saw some key players depart in the summer of 1950. First-choice goalkeeper Ian Black joined former manager Bill Dodgin at Fulham, with Hugh Kelly taking his place in exchange. He was followed by mainstay full-back Bill Rochford, who many fans had expected to succeed Dodgin as manager, to Colchester United; Norman Kirkman joined from Leicester City in his place. Also leaving the club prior to the start of the league campaign were José Gallego, George Smith, and Bobby Veck. It wasn't until just after the league had started, however, that the biggest transfer of the season took place – star forward Charlie Wayman, who had been the side's top scorer for the last three seasons, requested a move to Preston North End for a "substantial fee" and the exchange of Eddy Brown in return. Partway through the year, Southampton signed Scottish goalkeeper John Christie from Ayr United.

During the season, 27 players appeared for Southampton in all competitions. Left-half Joe Mallett featured in more games than any other player, being ever present in both the league and FA Cup with 44 appearances. New centre-forward Eddy Brown finished as Southampton's top scorer, with 20 goals in the league and two in the FA Cup. The club attracted an average home league attendance at The Dell of 21,770. The highest league attendance was 27,306 against league leaders (and eventual champions) Preston North End on 31 March 1951; the lowest was 13,922 against bottom-two side Chesterfield on 28 April 1951, the day of the 1951 FA Cup Final.

== Second Division ==
=== Season summary ===
Southampton kicked off the 1950–51 league campaign with a six-game unbeaten run, including a 2–1 opening day win over Barnsley, a tight 1–0 victory over fellow 1949–50 promotion contenders Sheffield United, and a late 1–0 away win over Luton Town. Despite finding themselves third in the league table and immediately vying for a promotion challenge, the absence of centre-forward Charlie Wayman early on had meant that goals were hard to find. In the second week of September, the club lost their star striker to Preston North End, who were looking to return to the top flight after being relegated two seasons previously, with the Lancashire side paying a "substantial fee" and sending Eddy Brown to take his place in the Saints squad. Brown's debut saw the team beating Leeds United 2–0, but over the next month four losses in five fixtures saw the Saints dropping as low as ninth in the table. Successive 1–0 home wins over Notts County and Bury ensured the team remained competitive in the top half of the league.

In the run-up to Christmas, Southampton picked up their form to move up the table. During November, the side picked up a hard-fought 5–4 win against Coventry City, before surprising recently-relegated Manchester City at Maine Road with a 3–2 win, to move back up to sixth in the Second Division table. Despite a 2–2 draw with Leicester City in the middle of a winning streak, in December the Saints continued their strong run with another 3–2 away win over struggling Chesterfield, followed by hard-fought 1–0 and 2–1 wins over Barnsley and fellow promotion contenders Sheffield United, respectively. Going into Christmas, the team had climbed all the way to the top of the table. Their run of good form ended on Boxing Day, however, when they suffered their biggest defeat of the season losing 0–4 to 19th-placed Brentford, with all four goals scored by prolific frontman Billy Dare. The loss saw the Saints drop four places to fifth in the table, and would mark the last time all season they occupied a promotion spot.

After ascending to the top of the table in December, the Saints fell quickly to the bottom half of the league when they went nine games without a win between Boxing Day 1950 and mid-March 1951. Going into the new year, Southampton suffered defeats at the hands of Leeds United, Swansea Town, Hull City and Birmingham City, as well as dropping points at home to Luton Town and West Ham United. A season-high 5–1 thrashing of bottom-placed Grimsby Town was enough to keep Southampton's Second Division status safe, but the team's form continued to suffer as they failed to pick up wins over sides much lower in the league table – losing at the end of March to both Queens Park Rangers and Bury. In their home fixture against Preston on 31 March, the Saints came back from 1–3 down to draw 3–3 with the league leaders (the point securing their promotion), preventing the eventual champions from breaking the Football League record of 14 consecutive wins. Six points from their final ten (including another win over Manchester City) meant that Southampton finished 12th in the Second Division table – disappointing when compared with 1948–49 and 1949–50, both of which almost ended in promotion to the First Division.

=== Final league table ===
Pos	Team	Pld	W	D	L	GF	GA	GAv	Pts
10	Hull City	42	16	11	15	74	70	1.057	43
11	Doncaster Rovers	42	15	13	14	64	68	0.941	43
12	Southampton	42	15	13	14	66	73	0.904	43
13	West Ham United	42	16	10	16	68	69	0.986	42
14	Leicester City	42	15	11	16	68	58	1.172	41

Source: RSSSF
Rules for classification: 1) Points; 2) Goal average; 3) Goals scored

=== Results by matchday ===
Round	1	2	3	4	5	6	7	8	9	10	11	12	13	14	15	16	17	18	19	20	21	22	23	24	25	26	27	28	29	30	31	32	33	34	35	36	37	38	39	40	41	42
Ground	A	H	H	A	A	H	H	A	A	H	A	H	A	H	A	H	A	H	A	H	A	H	A	A	H	A	H	A	H	A	H	A	H	A	A	H	H	A	H	A	H	H
Result	W	D	W	D	W	D	W	L	L	W	L	L	D	W	L	W	L	W	W	D	W	W	W	L	D	L	D	L	L	L	D	D	W	L	L	D	D	D	W	L	D	W
Position	6	5	5	4	3	3	3	4	6	4	6	9	8	6	7	6	8	6	6	5	5	3	1	5	4	6	6	7	10	12	14	12	9	12	14	12	12	11	10	12	13	12

Source: statto.com
A = Away; H = Home; W = Win; D = Draw; L = Loss

=== Match reports ===
19 August 1950 1	Barnsley	1–2	Southampton	Barnsley
	Wright 42'		Bates 8', 18'	Stadium: Oakwell; Attendance: 19,835

23 August 1950 2	Southampton	1–1	Doncaster Rovers	Southampton
	Edwards 83'		Tindill 24'	Stadium: The Dell; Attendance: 24,579

26 August 1950 3	Southampton	1–0	Sheffield United	Southampton
	Ellerington 77' (pen.)			Stadium: The Dell; Attendance: 22,859

30 August 1950 4	Doncaster Rovers	0–0	Southampton	Doncaster
				Stadium: Belle Vue; Attendance: 23,389

2 September 1950 5	Luton Town	0–1	Southampton	Luton
			Bates 84'	Stadium: Kenilworth Road; Attendance: 16,942

6 September 1950 6	Southampton	1–1	Blackburn Rovers	Southampton
	Day 10'		Todd 75'	Stadium: The Dell; Attendance: 22,561

9 September 1950 7	Southampton	2–0	Leeds United	Southampton
	Bates 9'; Edwards 39'			Stadium: The Dell; Attendance: 25,806

11 September 1950 8	Blackburn Rovers	1–0	Southampton	Blackburn
	Graham 11'			Stadium: Ewood Park; Attendance: 17,515

16 September 1950 9	West Ham United	3–0	Southampton	London
	Gazzard 4', 19'; Robinson			Stadium: Boleyn Ground; Attendance: 22,500

23 September 1950 10	Southampton	2–1	Swansea Town	Southampton
	Day 1'; Brown 82'		Howarth 31'	Stadium: The Dell; Attendance: 22,420

30 September 1950 11	Hull City	4–1	Southampton	Kingston upon Hull
	Harrison 6', 56'; Ackerman 37', 58'		Brown 19'	Stadium: Boothferry Park; Attendance: 25,000

7 October 1950 12	Southampton	0–2	Birmingham City	Southampton
			Green 81'; Smith 89'	Stadium: The Dell; Attendance: 25,499

14 October 1950 13	Cardiff City	2–2	Southampton	Cardiff
	Blair 1'; Mallett 33' (o.g.)		Stevenson 66', 82'	Stadium: Ninian Park; Attendance: 27,000

21 October 1950 14	Southampton	1–0	Notts County	Southampton
	Brown 48'			Stadium: The Dell; Attendance: 25,905

28 October 1950 15	Grimsby Town	4–2	Southampton	Cleethorpes
	Bloomer 5', 11', 53', 55'		Brown 12'; Bates 85'	Stadium: Blundell Park; Attendance: 13,383

4 November 1950 16	Southampton	1–0	Bury	Southampton
	Brown 30'			Stadium: The Dell; Attendance: 20,335

11 November 1950 17	Preston North End	3–2	Southampton	Preston
	Wayman 4', 16'; Quigley 68'		Day 22'; Brown 40'	Stadium: Deepdale; Attendance: 32,000

18 November 1950 18	Southampton	5–4	Coventry City	Southampton
	Bates; Day; Brown; Edwards 80'		Roberts; Chisholm; Allen; Lockhart	Stadium: The Dell; Attendance: 22,438

25 November 1950 19	Manchester City	2–3	Southampton	Manchester
	Westcott 14'; Haddleton 86'		Bates 19'; Day 22'; Edwards 43'	Stadium: Maine Road; Attendance: 38,972

2 December 1950 20	Southampton	2–2	Leicester City	Southampton
	Brown 80'; Bates 88'		Adam 2'; Rowley 31'	Stadium: The Dell; Attendance: 22,375

9 December 1950 21	Chesterfield	2–3	Southampton	Chesterfield
	Marron 7', 81'		Bates 58'; Day 60', 70'	Stadium: Saltergate; Attendance: 12,200

16 December 1950 22	Southampton	1–0	Barnsley	Southampton
	Brown 53'			Stadium: The Dell; Attendance: 17,207

23 December 1950 23	Sheffield United	1–2	Southampton	Sheffield
	Furniss 36' (pen.)		Edwards 7'; Brown 50'	Stadium: Bramall Lane; Attendance: 27,013

26 December 1950 24	Brentford	4–0	Southampton	London
	Dare 27', 32'			Stadium: Griffin Park; Attendance: 22,435

30 December 1950 25	Southampton	1–1	Luton Town	Southampton
	Bates 40'		Stobbart 90'	Stadium: The Dell; Attendance: 21,094

13 January 1951 26	Leeds United	5–3	Southampton	Leeds
	Williams 18'; Browning 35', 67', 69'; Burden 76'		Brown 65'; Day 78'; Stevenson 81'	Stadium: Elland Road; Attendance: 29,253

20 January 1951 27	Southampton	2–2	West Ham United	Southampton
	Brown 47'; Ellerington 63' (pen.)		Gazzard 21'; Robinson 62'	Stadium: The Dell; Attendance: 21,167

3 February 1951 28	Swansea Town	2–1	Southampton	Swansea
	Thomas 17'; Turnbull 24'		Brown 65'	Stadium: Vetch Field; Attendance: 17,451

17 February 1951 29	Southampton	2–3	Hull City	Southampton
	Dudley 25', 64'		Carter 59'; Harrison 72'; Gerrie 84'	Stadium: The Dell; Attendance: 23,720

28 February 1951 30	Birmingham City	2–1	Southampton	Birmingham
	Smith 30'; Stewart 80'		K. Wilkins 70'	Stadium: St Andrew's; Attendance: 12,593

3 March 1951 31	Southampton	1–1	Cardiff City	Southampton
	Edwards 29' (pen.)		Edwards 56'	Stadium: The Dell; Attendance: 23,493

10 March 1951 32	Notts County	2–2	Southampton	Nottingham
	Sewell 32'; Leuty 55'		Brown 22'; Dudley 52'	Stadium: Meadow Lane; Attendance: 25,712

17 March 1951 33	Southampton	5–1	Grimsby Town	Southampton
	Brown 2', 68'; Day 20'; Dudley 32', 67'		Cairns 66'	Stadium: The Dell; Attendance: 14,598

23 March 1951 34	Queens Park Rangers	2–0	Southampton	London
	Smith; Farrow 79'			Stadium: Loftus Road; Attendance: 19,711

24 March 1951 35	Bury	1–0	Southampton	Bury
	Daniel 89'			Stadium: Gigg Lane; Attendance: 11,433

26 March 1951 36	Southampton	2–2	Queens Park Rangers	Southampton
	Dudley 41', 61'		Farrow 59'; Addinall 84'	Stadium: The Dell; Attendance: 20,875

31 March 1951 37	Southampton	3–3	Preston North End	Southampton
	Brown 41', 80'; Edwards 64'		Wayman 6'; Horton 13', 62'	Stadium: The Dell; Attendance: 27,306

7 April 1951 38	Coventry City	2–2	Southampton	Coventry
	Roberts 20'; Lockhart 84' (pen.)		Edwards 45'; Curtis 69'	Stadium: Highfield Road; Attendance: 20,156

14 April 1951 39	Southampton	2–1	Manchester City	Southampton
	Day 1'; Brown 45'		Hart 15'	Stadium: The Dell; Attendance: 24,579

21 April 1951 40	Leicester City	3–1	Southampton	Leicester
	Baldwin 34'; Dryburgh 62', 72'		Dudley 80'	Stadium: Filbert Street; Attendance: 16,000

28 April 1951 41	Southampton	1–1	Chesterfield	Southampton
	Brown 80'		Hudson 11'	Stadium: The Dell; Attendance: 13,922

5 May 1951 42	Southampton	2–1	Brentford	Southampton
	Brown 24'; Day 74'		Monk 51'	Stadium: The Dell; Attendance: 14,441

== FA Cup ==
Notts County (6 January 1951)

Southampton entered the 1950–51 FA Cup in the third round, drawn away against fellow Second Division side Notts County. The travelling Saints quickly took control of the game, opening the scoring after 11 minutes when Eddy Brown beat several defenders to convert from close range. Just four minutes later, Brown doubled his (and his side's) tally when he followed up from a Jack Edwards header that ricocheted off the crossbar. Notts County came close to responding before the half-time break through Bob Crookes and Tom Johnston, but they were denied by Saints goalkeeper Hugh Kelly and defender Bill Ellerington, respectively. Early in the second half, it was the away side that asserted its dominance once again, with Brown almost scoring a hat-trick within seconds of the restart, before Eric Day scored off the post following a setup that involved both Brown and Ted Bates. County did finally score through Frank Broome just before the hour mark, but a few minutes later Day scored his second and Southampton's fourth with a "marvellous individual effort" in which he beat multiple defenders. Both Brown and Day came close to completing hat-tricks, but the final two goals came courtesy of a Leon Leuty penalty and a late Alex Simpson goal.

Sunderland (27 January 1951)

In the fourth round, Southampton travelled north again to face frequent FA Cup rivals, Sunderland of the First Division. Much of the first half was an even affair, with both sides enjoying chances on goal, but it was the hosts who broke the deadlock just three minutes before half-time, when Dickie Davis followed up a shot from Trevor Ford that had been saved by Hugh Kelly. The other side of the break, Davis scored a second for the Black Cats in the 51st minute, taking advantage of a poor clearance off the goal line by Ellerington. Despite mounting several attacks late on, Southampton were unable to respond.

6 January 1951 Round 3	Notts County	3–4	Southampton	Nottingham
	Broome 57'; Leuty (pen.); Simpson 86'		Brown 11', 15'; Day 49', 63'	Stadium: Meadow Lane; Attendance: 29,260

27 January 1951 Round 4	Sunderland	2–0	Southampton	Sunderland
	Davis 42', 51'			Stadium: Roker Park; Attendance: 61,319

== Additional friendlies ==
Southampton played a number of friendly matches during the 1950–51 season. The first, on 31 October 1950, saw the Saints hosting local Third Division South side Bournemouth & Boscombe Athletic in the Dell's first ever floodlit fixture, which ended goalless after a one-hour playtime. The second exhibition, on 10 February 1951, also ended in a draw as the Saints held top-flight Middlesbrough to a 1–1 finish – Southampton's goal was scored by Frank Dudley, who was making his first appearance for the club after signing from Leeds United. The Saints played Bournemouth & Boscombe again two weeks after the Middlesbrough fixture, this time at Dean Court, beating them 3–2 thanks to a hat-trick for Dudley. A 0–1 loss at Midland League side Boston United in April was followed by a 2–0 win over a Jersey XI side in May, a few days after the conclusion of the league campaign. A couple of weeks later, Southampton hosted two exhibitions as part of the celebrations for the Festival of Britain – first, they beat Swiss side Servette 3–0 thanks to goals from Brown, George Curtis and Eric Day, followed by a 3–3 draw with Danish side Kjøbenhavns Boldklub – all three goals coming from Brown.

31 October 1950 Friendly	Southampton	0–0	Bournemouth & Boscombe Athletic	Southampton
				Stadium: The Dell

10 February 1951 Friendly	Southampton	1–1	Middlesbrough	Southampton
	Dudley		Goal	Stadium: The Dell

24 February 1951 Friendly	Bournemouth & Boscombe Athletic	2–3	Southampton	Bournemouth
	Goal		Dudley	Stadium: Dean Court

23 April 1951 Friendly	Boston United	1–0	Southampton	Boston
	Goal			Stadium: York Street

9 May 1951 Friendly	Jersey XI	0–2	Southampton	Jersey
			Brown; Edwards

14 May 1951 Friendly	Southampton	3–0	Servette	Southampton
	Brown; Curtis; Eric Day			Stadium: The Dell

19 May 1951 Friendly	Southampton	3–3	Kjøbenhavns Boldklub	Southampton
	Brown		Goal	Stadium: The Dell

== Squad statistics ==
Name	Pos.	Nat.	League		FA Cup		Total	
Name	Pos.	Nat.	Apps.	Gls.	Apps.	Gls.	Apps.	Gls.
Alex Anderson	FB	(Scotland)	9	0	0	0	9	0
Ted Ballard	FB	(England)	21	0	0	0	21	0
Ted Bates	FW	(England)	29	10	2	0	31	10
Eddy Brown	FW	(England)	36	20	2	2	38	22
John Christie	GK	(Scotland)	5	0	0	0	5	0
Stan Clements	HB	(England)	14	0	0	0	14	0
George Curtis	HB	(England)	37	1	2	0	39	1
Eric Day	FW	(England)	37	12	2	2	39	14
Frank Dudley	FW	(England)	15	8	0	0	15	8
Jack Edwards	FW	(England)	36	8	2	0	38	8
Bill Ellerington	FB	(England)	34	2	2	0	36	2
Bryn Elliott	HB	(England)	23	0	2	0	25	0
Jack Gregory	FB	(England)	6	0	0	0	6	0
Ernie Jones	FW	(Wales)	12	1	0	0	12	1
Walter Judd	FW	(England)	1	0	0	0	1	0
Hugh Kelly	GK	(Republic of Ireland)	28	0	2	0	30	0
Norman Kirkman	FB	(England)	13	0	2	0	15	0
Tom Lowder	FW	(England)	3	0	0	0	3	0
Jimmy McGowan	FW	(Scotland)	0	0	0	0	0	0
Joe Mallett	HB	(England)	42	0	2	0	44	0
John Mitchell	FW	(England)	7	0	0	0	7	0
Augie Scott	FW	(England)	0	0	0	0	0	0
Peter Sillett	FB	(England)	0	0	0	0	0	0
Len Stansbridge	GK	(England)	4	0	0	0	4	0
Eddie Thomas	GK	(England)	5	0	0	0	5	0
Eric Webber	HB	(England)	28	0	2	0	30	0
Ron Wheatley	HB	(England)	1	0	0	0	1	0
Ken Wilkins	FW	(England)	2	1	0	0	2	1
Len Wilkins	HB	(England)	2	0	0	0	2	0
Players with appearances who left the club before the end of the season
Ernie Stevenson	FW	(England)	12	3	0	0	12	3

=== Most appearances ===
No.	Name	Pos.	Nat.	League		FA Cup		Total		
No.	Name	Pos.	Nat.	Apps.	Mins.	Apps.	Mins.	Apps.	Mins.	%
1	Joe Mallett	HB	(England)	42	3,780	2	180	44	3,960	100%
2	George Curtis	HB	(England)	37	3,330	2	180	39	3,510	88.64%
2	Eric Day	FW	(England)	37	3,330	2	180	39	3,510	88.64%
4	Eddy Brown	FW	(England)	36	3,240	2	180	38	3,420	86.36%
4	Jack Edwards	FW	(England)	36	3,240	2	180	38	3,420	86.36%
6	Bill Ellerington	FB	(England)	34	3,060	2	180	36	3,240	81.82%
7	Ted Bates	FW	(England)	29	2,610	2	180	31	2,790	70.45%
8	Hugh Kelly	GK	(Republic of Ireland)	28	2,520	2	180	30	2,700	68.18%
8	Eric Webber	HB	(England)	28	2,520	2	180	30	2,700	68.18%
10	Bryn Elliott	HB	(England)	23	2,070	2	180	25	2,250	56.82%

=== Top goalscorers ===
No.	Name	Pos.	Nat.	League		FA Cup		Total		
No.	Name	Pos.	Nat.	Gls.	Apps.	Gls.	Apps.	Gls.	Apps.	GPG
1	Eddy Brown	FW	(England)	20	36	2	2	22	38	0.58
2	Eric Day	FW	(England)	12	37	2	2	14	39	0.36
3	Ted Bates	FW	(England)	10	29	0	2	10	31	0.32
4	Frank Dudley	FW	(England)	8	15	0	0	8	15	0.53
4	Jack Edwards	FW	(England)	8	36	0	2	8	38	0.21
6	Ernie Stevenson	FW	(England)	3	12	0	0	3	12	0.25
7	Bill Ellerington	FB	(England)	2	34	0	2	2	36	0.06
8	Ken Wilkins	FW	(England)	1	2	0	0	1	2	0.50
8	Ernie Jones	FW	(England)	1	12	0	0	1	12	0.08
8	George Curtis	HB	(England)	1	37	0	2	1	39	0.03

== Transfers ==
Players transferred in
Date	Pos.	Name	Club	Fee	Ref.
May 1950	GK	(England) Eddie Thomas	(England) Swindon Town	Free	
June 1950	FB	(England) Peter Sillett	(England) Nomansland	Free	
July 1950	GK	(Republic of Ireland) Hugh Kelly	(England) Fulham	Exchange (Note: Hugh Kelly transferred to Southampton in exchange for Ian Black moving to Fulham.)	
July 1950	FB	(England) Norman Kirkman	(England) Leicester City	Free	
September 1950	FW	(England) Eddy Brown	(England) Preston North End	Exchange (Note: Preston North End bought Charlie Wayman for a "substantial fee" and the exchange of Eddy Brown.)	
January 1951	GK	(Scotland) John Christie	(Scotland) Ayr United	Free	
February 1951	FW	(England) Frank Dudley	(England) Leeds United	Exchange (Note: Frank Dudley transferred to Southampton in exchange for Ernie Stevenson moving to Leeds United.)	
Players transferred out
Date	Pos.	Name	Club	Fee	Ref.
Summer 1950	FW	(Spain) José Gallego	(England) Colchester United	Free	
May 1950	FW	(England) George Smith	(England) Crystal Palace	Free	
July 1950	GK	(Scotland) Ian Black	(England) Fulham	Exchange	
July 1950	FB	(England) Bill Rochford	(England) Colchester United	Free	
July 1950	FW	(England) Bobby Veck	(England) Gillingham	Free	
August 1950	FW	(England) Reginald Dare	(England) Exeter City	Free	
September 1950	FW	(England) Charlie Wayman	(England) Preston North End	Undisclosed	
February 1951	FW	(England) Ernie Stevenson	(England) Leeds United	Exchange	
Players released
Date	Pos.	Name	Subsequent club	Join date	Ref.
Summer 1950	FW	(England) Bill Molloy	(Wales) Newport County	November 1950	

== Bibliography ==
- Chalk, Gary; Holley, Duncan; Bull, David (November 2013), All the Saints: A Complete Players' Who's Who of Southampton FC, Bristol, England: Hagiology Publishing, ISBN 978-0-9926864-0-6
- Holley, Duncan; Chalk, Gary (2003), Bull, David (ed.), In That Number: A Post-War Chronicle of Southampton FC, Bristol, England: Hagiology Publishing, ISBN 0-9534474-3-X
