= 1949–50 Southampton F.C. season =

English football club season

Southampton F.C.
1949–50 season
- Chairman: Penn Barrow
- Manager: Bill Dodgin (to July 1949); Sid Cann (from July 1949)
- Stadium: The Dell
- Second Division: 4th
- FA Cup: Third round
- Top goalscorer: League: Charlie Wayman (24); All: Charlie Wayman (26)
- Highest home attendance: 30,240 v Tottenham Hotspur (8 October 1949)
- Lowest home attendance: 20,689 v Bury (4 February 1950)
- Average home league attendance: 23,895
- Biggest win: 5–0 v Hull City (5 November 1949)
- Biggest defeat: 0–4 v Swansea Town (10 September 1949); 0–4 v Tottenham Hotspur (25 February 1950)
Home colours

The 1949–50 season was the 49th year of competitive football played by Southampton F.C., the club's 23rd season as members of the Football League, and their 21st competing in the Second Division. The Saints finished the campaign in fourth place in the league table, having gained 52 from a possible 84 points with 19 wins, 14 draws and nine losses – missing out on promotion only on goal average. The club also competed in the FA Cup, losing a third round replay against Northampton Town.

After narrowly missing out on promotion to the First Division during the previous season, Southampton looked to build on their squad with two big signings in the summer of 1949: winger Ernie Jones for £6,000 (plus Alf Ramsey) from Tottenham Hotspur, followed by Jack Edwards for £10,000 from Nottingham Forest. Ramsey made his long-touted move away from the club, who also sent Tommy Rudkin to Bristol City, Albie Roles to Gloucester City, George Horsfall to Southend United, and Bill Heaton (who had only joined in February) to Stalybridge Celtic. Bill Dodgin left the club as manager in July 1949 and was replaced by assistant Sid Cann. The new manager continued to sign players throughout the season, adding Bryn Elliott, Bill Molloy and Tom Lowder in October 1949, followed by right-back Alex Anderson, and inside-forwards Jimmy McGowan and Ernie Stevenson in early 1950 (the last of whom the Saints paid Cardiff City a "five-figure fee" for, as well as sending Wilf Grant to the club).

During the season, 25 players appeared for Southampton in all competitions. George Curtis, converted from winger to wing-half, featured in more games than any other player, being ever present in both the league and FA Cup with 44 appearances. Centre-forward Charlie Wayman finished as Southampton's top scorer with 24 goals in the league and two in the FA Cup. The club attracted an average home league attendance at The Dell of 23,895 – slightly less than the previous season. The highest league attendance was 30,240 against eventual Second Division champions Tottenham Hotspur on 8 October 1949; the lowest was 20,689 against Bury on 4 February 1950.

== Second Division ==
=== Season summary ===
Southampton had a poor start to the 1949–50 season, losing their first three fixtures against Grimsby Town, Barnsley and Queens Park Rangers to find themselves at the bottom of the league table. Hard-fought victories over Preston North End (recently relegated from the First Division) and West Ham United gave the Saints their crucial first few points, as the new players began to settle in with their teammates. In the three months between mid-September and mid-December, the team went on an unbeaten run of 13 games to jump all the way from 19th to fourth in the table, picking up key wins in the process over fellow promotion-hopefuls Leeds United and recently promoted Hull City (the Saints' 5–0 victory was the club's biggest win of the season, and featured a hat-trick for Charlie Wayman), as well as hard-fought draws with championship contenders Tottenham Hotspur and Sheffield Wednesday. Going into the new year with two more wins, Southampton found themselves regularly occupying a top-five position in the league table.

After dropping to seventh in the table following two losses in January, Southampton picked up wins over Bury and Sheffield United in February to return to the top five, with mixed fortunes over their next few games seeing them climb and fall between fourth and sixth. After a joint-record season loss of 0–4 against leaders Tottenham, the Saints boosted their squad with the additions of forwards Jimmy McGowan and Ernie Stevenson, both of whom played central roles in the last run of fixtures. With their new recruits, Southampton saw an improved run of form, remaining unbeaten for their last nine games of the season. However, despite closely fought wins over key promotion rivals, including Hull City, Sheffield Wednesday and Sheffield United, the Saints were unable to obtain promotion and finished the season in fourth place – the final game of the season saw Wednesday secure the second promotion spot after drawing with league champions Tottenham due to their slightly higher goal average, with Sheffield United finishing in third after beating Hull 5–0.

=== Final league table ===
Pos	Team	Pld	W	D	L	GF	GA	GAv	Pts	Qualification or relegation
2	Sheffield Wednesday (P)	42	18	16	8	67	48	1.396	52	Promotion to the First Division
3	Sheffield United	42	19	14	9	68	49	1.388	52	
4	Southampton	42	19	14	9	64	48	1.333	52	
5	Leeds United	42	17	13	12	54	45	1.200	47	
6	Preston North End	42	18	9	15	60	49	1.224	45	

Source: RSSSF
Rules for classification: 1) Points; 2) Goal average; 3) Goals scored
(P) Promoted

=== Results by matchday ===
Round	1	2	3	4	5	6	7	8	9	10	11	12	13	14	15	16	17	18	19	20	21	22	23	24	25	26	27	28	29	30	31	32	33	34	35	36	37	38	39	40	41	42
Ground	H	A	A	H	H	A	A	H	A	A	H	H	A	H	A	H	A	H	A	A	H	A	H	A	H	A	H	A	H	A	H	A	H	A	H	A	H	H	A	A	H	H
Result	L	L	L	D	W	W	L	W	D	W	D	W	W	W	D	D	D	W	D	D	L	D	W	W	L	L	W	W	D	L	W	D	L	W	W	D	W	W	D	D	W	W
Position	16	21	22	20	18	14	19	17	16	13	14	11	10	5	6	6	6	4	4	4	5	6	6	5	6	7	6	5	6	6	5	4	6	4	4	4	4	4	4	4	4	4

Source: statto.com
A = Away; H = Home; W = Win; D = Draw; L = Loss

=== Match reports ===
20 August 1949 1	Southampton	1–2	Grimsby Town	Southampton
	Edwards 63'		Briggs 12', 53'	Stadium: The Dell; Attendance: 26,222

24 August 1949 2	Barnsley	2–1	Southampton	Barnsley
	Griffiths 39'; Baxter		Wayman 60'	Stadium: Oakwell; Attendance: 17,762

27 August 1949 3	Queens Park Rangers	1–0	Southampton	London
	Hudson 26'			Stadium: Loftus Road; Attendance: 23,040

31 August 1949 4	Southampton	0–0	Barnsley	Southampton
				Stadium: The Dell; Attendance: 22,319

3 September 1949 5	Southampton	1–0	Preston North End	Southampton
	Bates 64'			Stadium: The Dell; Attendance: 26,317

5 September 1949 6	West Ham United	1–2	Southampton	London
	Robinson 60' (pen.)		Wayman 25'; Bates 28'	Stadium: Boleyn Ground; Attendance: 26,317

10 September 1949 7	Swansea Town	4–0	Southampton	Swansea
	Paul 44' (pen.), 87' (pen.); Richards 65'; O'Driscoll 89'			Stadium: Vetch Field; Attendance: 29,000

17 September 1949 8	Southampton	2–1	Leeds United	Southampton
	Wayman 7', 15'		Harrison 85'	Stadium: The Dell; Attendance: 23,214

24 September 1949 9	Bury	1–1	Southampton	Bury
	Bodle 82'		Bates 72'	Stadium: Gigg Lane; Attendance: 15,095

1 October 1949 10	Coventry City	1–2	Southampton	Coventry
	Roberts 56'		Edwards 36'; Day 53'	Stadium: Highfield Road; Attendance: 22,549

8 October 1949 11	Southampton	1–1	Tottenham Hotspur	Southampton
	Bates 87'		Walters 48'	Stadium: The Dell; Attendance: 30,240

22 October 1949 12	Southampton	3–1	Blackburn Rovers	Southampton
	Bates 19'; Wayman 21'; Day 29'		Wharton 45'	Stadium: The Dell; Attendance: 21,406

29 October 1949 13	Brentford	0–1	Southampton	London
			Jones	Stadium: Griffin Park; Attendance: 21,860

5 November 1949 14	Southampton	5–0	Hull City	Southampton
	Wayman 5', 9', 50'; Bates 35'; Edwards 78'			Stadium: The Dell; Attendance: 23,275

12 November 1949 15	Sheffield Wednesday	2–2	Southampton	Sheffield
	Wayman 8'; Edwards 19'		Froggatt 54'; Whitcomb 79'	Stadium: Hillsborough Stadium; Attendance: 32,146

19 November 1949 16	Southampton	3–3	Plymouth Argyle	Southampton
	Bates 25', 82'; Wayman 30'		Dews 56'; Williams 59'; Strauss 75'	Stadium: The Dell; Attendance: 25,129

26 November 1949 17	Chesterfield	0–0	Southampton	Chesterfield
				Stadium: Saltergate; Attendance: 10,605

3 December 1949 18	Southampton	3–1	Bradford Park Avenue	Southampton
	Edwards 24' (pen.); Day 35'; Bates 72'		Henry 5'	Stadium: The Dell; Attendance: 20,876

10 December 1949 19	Leicester City	2–2	Southampton	Leicester
	Griffiths 7'; Lee 70'		Wayman 6'; Bates 69'	Stadium: Filbert Street; Attendance: 22,167

17 December 1949 20	Grimsby Town	1–1	Southampton	Cleethorpes
	Cairns 55'		Wayman 23'	Stadium: Blundell Park; Attendance: 14,000

24 December 1949 21	Southampton	1–2	Queens Park Rangers	Southampton
	Wayman 60'		Neary 68'	Stadium: The Dell; Attendance: 21,391

26 December 1949 22	Luton Town	1–1	Southampton	Luton
	Cooke 31' (pen.)		Wayman 12'	Stadium: Kenilworth Road; Attendance: 18,765

27 December 1949 23	Southampton	2–1	Luton Town	Southampton
	Day; Bates		Kiernan 63'	Stadium: The Dell; Attendance: 26,928

31 December 1949 24	Preston North End	0–3	Southampton	Preston
			Wayman 19', 31'; Day 72'	Stadium: Deepdale; Attendance: 27,000

14 January 1950 25	Southampton	1–2	Swansea Town	Southampton
	Wayman 32'		Lucas 58'; Allchurch 78'	Stadium: The Dell; Attendance: 24,674

21 January 1950 26	Leeds United	1–0	Southampton	Leeds
	Williams 82'			Stadium: Elland Road; Attendance: 38,500

4 February 1950 27	Southampton	4–1	Bury	Southampton
	Wayman 8', 79'; Day 62'; Bates 82'		Massart 54'	Stadium: The Dell; Attendance: 20,689

11 February 1950 28	Sheffield United	0–1	Southampton	Sheffield
			Wheatley 75'	Stadium: Bramall Lane; Attendance: 30,000

18 February 1950 29	Southampton	1–1	Coventry City	Southampton
	Veck 77'		Wilkins 11' (o.g.)	Stadium: The Dell; Attendance: 23,412

25 February 1950 30	Tottenham Hotspur	4–0	Southampton	London
	Medley 19', 25'; Rees 73'; Duquemin 79'			Stadium: White Hart Lane; Attendance: 70,302

4 March 1950 31	Southampton	3–1	Cardiff City	Southampton
	Day 5'; McGowan 11'; Bates 72'			Stadium: The Dell; Attendance: 23,375

11 March 1950 32	Blackburn Rovers	0–0	Southampton	Blackburn
				Stadium: Ewood Park; Attendance: 18,300

18 March 1950 33	Southampton	2–3	Brentford	Southampton
	Day 10', 69'		Paton 30'; Dare 44'; Mallett 73' (o.g.)	Stadium: The Dell; Attendance: 22,429

25 March 1950 34	Hull City	1–2	Southampton	Kingston upon Hull
	Gibson 32'		Stevenson 17', 89'	Stadium: Boothferry Park; Attendance: 32,000

1 April 1950 35	Southampton	1–0	Chesterfield	Southampton
	Stevenson 67'			Stadium: The Dell; Attendance: 21,964

8 April 1950 36	Bradford Park Avenue	0–0	Southampton	Bradford
				Stadium: Horsfall Stadium; Attendance: 16,363

10 April 1950 37	Southampton	1–0	Sheffield United	Southampton
	Wayman 82'			Stadium: The Dell; Attendance: 23,528

15 April 1950 38	Southampton	1–0	Sheffield Wednesday	Southampton
	Wayman 51'			Stadium: The Dell; Attendance: 28,529

17 April 1950 39	Cardiff City	1–1	Southampton	Cardiff
	Edwards 35'		Wayman 25'	Stadium: Ninian Park; Attendance: 21,247

22 April 1950 40	Plymouth Argyle	0–0	Southampton	Plymouth
				Stadium: Home Park; Attendance: 22,873

29 April 1950 41	Southampton	5–3	Leicester City	Southampton
	Bates 7', 22'; Wayman 34', 61'; Stevenson 63' (pen.)		Lee 5', 65'; Barlow 67'	Stadium: The Dell; Attendance: 21,091

6 May 1950 42	Southampton	3–2	West Ham United	Southampton
	Jones 49', 56'; Stevenson 69'		Robinson 22', 35'	Stadium: The Dell; Attendance: 24,778

== FA Cup ==
Northampton Town (7 January 1950)

Southampton entered the 1949–50 FA Cup in the third round, drawn against Third Division South promotion contenders Northampton Town. In front of a record crowd of 23,209 at Northampton's County Ground, the visitors took the lead in the 18th minute against the run of play, when Augie Scott followed up from Eric Day's blocked shot to make it 1–0. In the next minute, however, the hosts equalised through Tommy McCulloch, who took advantage of a mistake by George Curtis to take possession and score with a low shot. Going into half-time, Southampton were reduced to ten men when Ernie Jones had to be taken off on a stretcher after breaking his ankle, while Ron Wheatley and Ted Bates played on with minor injuries. After the break, Northampton sought to take advantage of the reduced Saints (who also lost Eric Webber towards the end), coming close to going in front on numerous occasions but for the Southampton defence and the crossbar; ultimately, the game finished level, and a replay was scheduled.

Northampton Town replay (11 January 1950)

With a depleted first team due to injuries, Southampton struggled to gain a hold on the home replay against Northampton, with the visiting Cobblers enjoying the majority of possession and goal-scoring chances in the opening 45 minutes. The game remained goalless going into half-time, before three goals came in the first five minutes after the break – first, Arthur Dixon put the visitors in front with a header from a corner; the next minute, Charlie Wayman headed in a cross from Eric Day, and a couple of minutes after that Wayman scored a second due to a mistake by goalkeeper Jack Ansell. After leading for just over 10 minutes, the Saints conceded an equaliser through Gwyn Hughes as the result of another corner, before in the 80th minute a third goal from a corner came courtesy of Maurice Candlin.

7 January 1950 Round 3	Northampton Town	1–1	Southampton	Northampton
	McCulloch 19'		Scott 18'	Stadium: County Ground; Attendance: 23,209

11 January 1950 Round 3 replay	Southampton	2–3	Northampton Town	Southampton
	Dixon 46'; Hughes 62'; Candlin 80'		Wayman 47', 49'	Stadium: The Dell; Attendance: 24,806

== Additional friendlies ==
Southampton played one friendly during the 1949–50 season, beating Third Division South side Torquay United 1–0 on 28 January 1950, the only goal scored by reserves player Reginald Dare. Shortly after the conclusion of the league campaign, the team went on a Scandinavian tour which included five exhibition matches. The first, against Danish side Aalborg, ended in a 6–2 win for the travelling Saints, with Charlie Wayman scoring four goals and Ted Bates and Eric Day each scoring one. The victory was followed by a 2–1 loss at Helsingborg, a 1–1 draw with side Copenhagen, a 1–0 win over Aarhus, and a 2–2 draw with Esbjerg.

28 January 1950 Friendly	Southampton	1–0	Torquay United	Southampton
	Dare			Stadium: The Dell

25 May 1950 Friendly	Aalborg	2–6	Southampton	Denmark
	Goal		Wayman; Bates; Day

29 May 1950 Friendly	Helsingborg	2–1	Southampton	Sweden
	Goal		Bates

1 June 1950 Friendly	Copenhagen	1–1	Southampton	Denmark
	Goal		Goal

5 June 1950 Friendly	Aarhus	0–1	Southampton	Denmark
			Bates

8 June 1950 Friendly	Esbjerg	2–2	Southampton	Denmark
	Goal		Wayman

== Squad statistics ==
Name	Pos.	Nat.	League		FA Cup		Total	
Name	Pos.	Nat.	Apps.	Gls.	Apps.	Gls.	Apps.	Gls.
Alex Anderson	FB	(Scotland)	8	0	0	0	8	0
Ted Ballard	FB	(England)	18	0	2	0	20	0
Ted Bates	FW	(England)	33	15	2	0	35	15
Ian Black	GK	(Scotland)	39	0	2	0	41	0
Stan Clements	HB	(England)	0	0	1	0	1	0
George Curtis	HB	(England)	42	0	2	0	44	0
Reginald Dare	FW	(England)	0	0	0	0	0	0
Eric Day	FW	(England)	38	9	2	0	40	9
Jack Edwards	FW	(England)	28	5	0	0	28	5
Bill Ellerington	FB	(England)	24	0	0	0	24	0
Bryn Elliott	HB	(England)	2	0	0	0	2	0
José Gallego	FW	(Spain)	0	0	0	0	0	0
Jack Gregory	FB	(England)	0	0	0	0	0	0
Ernie Jones	FW	(Wales)	30	3	1	0	31	3
Walter Judd	FW	(England)	0	0	0	0	0	0
Tom Lowder	FW	(England)	10	0	0	0	10	0
Jimmy McGowan	FW	(Scotland)	3	1	0	0	3	1
Joe Mallett	HB	(England)	38	0	0	0	38	0
John Mitchell	FW	(England)	0	0	0	0	0	0
Bill Molloy	FW	(England)	1	0	0	0	1	0
Bill Rochford	FB	(England)	14	0	0	0	14	0
Augie Scott	FW	(England)	4	0	2	1	6	1
George Smith	HB	(England)	0	0	0	0	0	0
Len Stansbridge	GK	(England)	3	0	0	0	3	0
Ernie Stevenson	FW	(England)	11	5	0	0	11	5
Bobby Veck	FW	(England)	2	1	0	0	2	1
Charlie Wayman	FW	(England)	36	24	2	2	38	26
Eric Webber	HB	(England)	42	0	1	0	43	0
Ron Wheatley	HB	(England)	8	1	2	0	10	1
Ken Wilkins	FW	(England)	0	0	0	0	0	0
Len Wilkins	HB	(England)	24	0	2	0	26	0
Players with appearances who left the club before the end of the season
Wilf Grant	FW	(England)	4	0	1	0	5	0

=== Most appearances ===
No.	Name	Pos.	Nat.	League		FA Cup		Total		
No.	Name	Pos.	Nat.	Apps.	Mins.	Apps.	Mins.	Apps.	Mins.	%
1	George Curtis	HB	(England)	42	3,780	2	180	44	3,960	100%
2	Eric Webber	HB	(England)	42	3,780	1	90	43	3,870	97.73%
3	Ian Black	GK	(Scotland)	39	3,510	2	180	41	3,690	93.18%
4	Eric Day	FW	(England)	38	3,420	2	180	40	3,600	90.91%
5	Joe Mallett	HB	(England)	38	3,420	0	0	38	3,420	86.36%
5	Charlie Wayman	FW	(England)	36	3,240	2	180	38	3,420	86.36%
7	Ted Bates	FW	(England)	33	2,970	2	180	35	3,150	79.55%
8	Ernie Jones	FW	(England)	30	2,700	1	90	31	2,790	70.45%
9	Jack Edwards	FW	(England)	28	2,520	0	0	28	2,520	63.64%
10	Len Wilkins	HB	(England)	24	2,160	2	180	26	2,340	59.09%

=== Top goalscorers ===
No.	Name	Pos.	Nat.	League		FA Cup		Total		
No.	Name	Pos.	Nat.	Gls.	Apps.	Gls.	Apps.	Gls.	Apps.	GPG
1	Charlie Wayman	FW	(England)	24	36	2	2	26	38	0.68
2	Ted Bates	FW	(England)	15	33	0	2	15	35	0.43
3	Eric Day	FW	(England)	9	38	0	2	9	40	0.23
4	Ernie Stevenson	FW	(England)	5	11	0	0	5	11	0.45
4	Jack Edwards	FW	(England)	5	28	0	0	5	28	0.18
6	Ernie Jones	FW	(England)	3	30	0	1	3	31	0.10
7	Bobby Veck	FW	(England)	1	2	0	0	1	2	0.50
7	Jimmy McGowan	FW	(Scotland)	1	3	0	0	1	3	0.33
7	Augie Scott	FW	(England)	0	4	1	2	1	6	0.17
7	Ron Wheatley	FW	(England)	1	8	0	2	1	10	0.10

== Transfers ==
Players transferred in
Date	Pos.	Name	Club	Fee	Ref.
May 1949	FW	(Wales) Ernie Jones	(England) Tottenham Hotspur	£6,000 (Note: Ernie Jones transferred to Southampton in exchange for £6,000 and Alf Ramsey moving to Tottenham Hotspur.)	
June 1949	FW	(England) Reginald Dare	(England) Alton Town	Free	
June 1949	FW	(England) Jack Edwards	(England) Nottingham Forest	£10,000	
August 1949	FW	(England) Walter Judd	(England) Nomansland	Free	
October 1949	HB	(England) Bryn Elliott	(England) Boston United	Free	
October 1949	FW	(England) Bill Molloy	(England) Coventry City	Free	
October 1949	FW	(England) Tom Lowder	(England) Boston United	Free	
October 1949	FW	(England) Ken Wilkins	(England) Sunderland	Free	
January 1950	FB	(Scotland) Alex Anderson	(Scotland) Forfar Athletic	Free	
March 1950	FW	(Scotland) Jimmy McGowan	(England) Grimsby Town	Free	
March 1950	FW	(England) Ernie Stevenson	(England) Cardiff City	£10,000+ (Note: Ernie Stevenson transferred to Southampton in exchange for a five-figure fee and Wilf Grant moving to Cardiff City.)	
Players transferred out
Date	Pos.	Name	Club	Fee	Ref.
May 1949	FB	(England) Alf Ramsey	(England) Tottenham Hotspur	Exchange	
May 1949	FW	(England) Tommy Rudkin	(England) Bristol City	Free	
June 1949	FB	(England) Albie Roles	(England) Gloucester City	Free	
July 1949	HB	(Australia) George Horsfall	(England) Southend United	Free	
September 1949	HB	(England) Bill Dodgin Jr.	(England) Fulham	Free	
September 1949	FW	(England) Bill Heaton	(England) Stalybridge Celtic	Free	
March 1950	FW	(England) Wilf Grant	(England) Cardiff City	Exchange	

== Bibliography ==
- Chalk, Gary; Holley, Duncan; Bull, David (November 2013), All the Saints: A Complete Players' Who's Who of Southampton FC, Bristol, England: Hagiology Publishing, ISBN 978-0-9926864-0-6
- Holley, Duncan; Chalk, Gary (2003), Bull, David (ed.), In That Number: A Post-War Chronicle of Southampton FC, Bristol, England: Hagiology Publishing, ISBN 0-9534474-3-X
