= 1949–50 Cardiff City F.C. season =

Welsh football club season

Cardiff City
1949–50 season
- Chairman: (Wales) Sir Herbert Merrett
- Manager: (England) Cyril Spiers
- Division Two: 10th
- FA Cup: 5th round
- Welsh Cup: 7th round
- Top goalscorer: League: Elfed Evans (8); All: Elfed Evans (12)
- Highest home attendance: 57,510 v Swansea Town 27 August 1949
- Lowest home attendance: 16,260 v Brentford 10 April 1950
- Average home league attendance: 28,521
Home colours

The 1949–50 season was Cardiff City F.C.'s 23rd season in the Football League. They competed in the 22-team Division Two, then the second tier of English football, finishing tenth.

== Season review ==
=== Football League Second Division ===
==== Partial league table ====
Pos	Team	Pld	W	D	L	GF	GA	GAv	Pts
8	Swansea Town	42	17	9	16	53	49	1.082	43
9	Brentford	42	15	13	14	44	49	0.898	43
10	Cardiff City	42	16	10	16	41	44	0.932	42
11	Grimsby Town	42	16	8	18	74	73	1.014	40
12	Coventry City	42	13	13	16	55	55	1.000	39

Rules for classification: 1) Points; 2) Goal average; 3) Goals scored

=== Results by round ===
Round	1	2	3	4	5	6	7	8	9	10	11	12	13	14	15	16	17	18	19	20	21	22	23	24	25	26	27	28	29	30	31	32	33	34	35	36	37	38	39	40	41	42
Ground	A	H	H	A	H	H	A	H	A	H	A	A	H	A	H	A	H	A	H	H	A	A	H	A	H	A	H	A	H	A	H	A	H	A	A	H	H	A	H	H	A	A
Result	L	W	W	D	L	W	D	L	D	W	L	L	D	L	L	L	W	W	W	W	L	D	W	L	W	L	L	W	W	L	W	D	W	D	L	W	D	W	D	L	L	D
Position			6	5	13	5	8	13	12	10	11	16	15	17	19	20	18	16	15	10	15	14	12	15	13	15	17	15	14	16	13	14	12	11	12	10	12	9	8	9	10	10
Points	0	2	4	5	5	7	8	8	9	11	11	11	12	12	12	12	14	16	18	20	20	21	23	23	25	25	25	27	29	29	31	32	34	35	35	37	38	40	41	41	41	42

A = Away; H = Home; W = Win; D = Draw; L = Loss

== Players ==
First team squad.

Note: Flags indicate national team as defined under FIFA eligibility rules; some limited exceptions apply. Players may hold more than one non-FIFA nationality.

No.	Pos.	Nation	Player
--	GK	SCO	Alf Steel
--	GK	ENG	Phil Joslin
--	GK	WAL	Ted Morris
--	DF	WAL	Ken Hollyman
--	DF	WAL	Arthur Lever
--	DF	SCO	Harry May
--	DF	ENG	Stan Montgomery
--	DF	ENG	Alf Rowland
--	DF	WAL	Alf Sherwood
--	DF	WAL	Albert Stitfall
--	DF	WAL	Ron Stitfall
--	DF	WAL	Derrick Sullivan
--	DF	WAL	Glyn Williams

No.	Pos.	Nation	Player
--	MF	WAL	Billy Baker
--	MF	WAL	Roley Williams
--	FW	ENG	Tommy Best
--	FW	ENG	Doug Blair
--	FW	WAL	George Edwards
--	FW	WAL	Elfed Evans
--	FW	WAL	Ted Gorin
--	FW	ENG	Wilf Grant
--	FW	SCO	Bob Lamie
--	FW	SCO	Robert McLaren
--	FW	WAL	Gordon Pembery
--	FW	ENG	Ernie Stevenson
--	FW	SCO	Bobby Taggart

== Fixtures and results ==
=== Second Division ===
20 August 1949 1	Blackburn Rovers	1–0	Cardiff City	Blackburn
	Jackie Wharton			Stadium: Ewood Park; Attendance: 28,265; Referee: SE Law

22 August 1949 2	Cardiff City	1–0	Sheffield Wednesday	Cardiff
18:15	Ernie Stevenson 87'			Stadium: Ninian Park; Attendance: 37,913; Referee: AH Blythe (London)

27 August 1949 3	Cardiff City	1–0	Swansea Town	Cardiff
15:15	Tommy Best			Stadium: Ninian Park; Attendance: 57,510; Referee: Alfred Tolley (Worcester)

29 August 1949 4	Sheffield Wednesday	1–1	Cardiff City	Sheffield
18:30	Redfern Froggatt		(pen.) Ernie Stevenson	Stadium: Hillsborough; Attendance: 32,765; Referee: AH Blythe (London)

3 September 1949 5	Cardiff City	0–1	Tottenham Hotspur	Cardiff
15:15			Les Medley	Stadium: Ninian Park; Attendance: 42,649; Referee: Percy Annette (Basingstoke)

5 September 1949 6	Cardiff City	2–0	Hull City	Cardiff
18:00	Tommy Best; Tommy Best			Stadium: Ninian Park; Attendance: 40,254; Referee: Fred Green (Wolverhampton)

10 September 1949 7	Bury	2–2	Cardiff City	Bury
15:00	Fred Worthington; Dave Massart		Tommy Best; Roley Williams	Stadium: Gigg Lane; Attendance: 17,371; Referee: RL Aldridge (Birmingham)

17 September 1949 8	Cardiff City	2–4	Leicester City	Cardiff
15:15	Tommy Best; George Edwards		Ken Chisholm; Ken Chisholm; Mal Griffiths; Jack Lee	Stadium: Ninian Park; Attendance: 32,044; Referee: RS Lloyd

24 September 1949 9	Bradford	3–3	Cardiff City	Bradford
	Bill Deplidge; Gerry Henry; Harry McIlvenny		George Edwards; Ron Stitfall; Ron Stitfall	Stadium: Park Avenue; Attendance: 13,187; Referee: Alf Bond (London)

1 October 1949 10	Cardiff City	2–0	Chesterfield	Cardiff
15:15	Doug Blair; Ernie Stevenson			Stadium: Ninian Park; Attendance: 29,619; Referee: Joe McCann (Preston)

8 October 1949 11	Leeds United	2–0	Cardiff City	Leeds
	Frank Dudley 46'; Len Browning 59'			Stadium: Elland Road; Attendance: 25,523; Referee: William Rogers (Birmingham)

22 October 1949 12	Coventry City	2–1	Cardiff City	Coventry
	Iain Jamieson 6'; Peter Murphy 40'		87' Doug Blair	Stadium: Highfield Road; Attendance: 23,042; Referee: Jack Clough (Bolton)

29 October 1949 13	Cardiff City	0–0	Luton Town	Cardiff
15:00		Luton report		Stadium: Ninian Park; Attendance: 24,011; Referee: Roland Burgess (Reading)

5 November 1949 14	Barnsley	1–0	Cardiff City	Barnsley
	Alex Wright			Stadium: Oakwell; Attendance: 18,564; Referee: George Pankhurst (Warwick)

12 November 1949 15	Cardiff City	0–1	West Ham United	Cardiff
14:45			Bill Robinson	Stadium: Ninian Park; Attendance: 21,644; Referee: SV Davis

19 November 1949 16	Sheffield United	2–0	Cardiff City	Sheffield
14:15	Harry Hitchen 15'; Fred Smith 85'			Stadium: Bramall Lane; Attendance: 24,702; Referee: Fred Green (Wolverhampton)

26 November 1949 17	Cardiff City	1–0	Grimsby Town	Cardiff
14:30	Ron Stitfall			Stadium: Ninian Park; Attendance: 22,664; Referee: HC Williams (Fulham)

3 December 1949 18	Queens Park Rangers	0–1	Cardiff City	London
14:30			Ron Stitfall	Stadium: Loftus Road; Attendance: 15,954; Referee: JW Richards (Cheadle)

10 December 1949 19	Cardiff City	3–2	Preston North End	Cardiff
14:30	Ron Stitfall; George Edwards; George Edwards		Fred Ramscar; Fred Ramscar	Stadium: Ninian Park; Attendance: 21,922; Referee: AW Smith (Aldershot)

17 December 1949 20	Cardiff City	2–1	Blackburn Rovers	Cardiff
14:30	George Edwards 16'; Ron Stitfall 67'		62' Les Graham	Stadium: Ninian Park; Attendance: 19,882; Referee: SE Law (West Bromwich)

24 December 1949 21	Swansea Town	5–1	Cardiff City	Swansea
14:30	Billy Lucas; Billy Lucas; Sammy McCrory; Jackie O'Driscoll; Jackie O'Driscoll		Ron Stitfall	Stadium: Vetch Field; Attendance: 27,264; Referee: Alfred (AH) Tolley (Worcester)

26 December 1949 22	Plymouth Argyle	0–0	Cardiff City	Plymouth
14:30				Stadium: Home Park; Attendance: 28,585; Referee: ES Vickery (Bristol)

27 December 1949 23	Cardiff City	1–0	Plymouth Argyle	Cardiff
14:30	Elfed Evans			Stadium: Ninian Park; Attendance: 32,499; Referee: ES Vickery (Bristol)

31 December 1949 24	Tottenham Hotspur	2–0	Cardiff City	London
14:15	Eddie Baily; Billy Rees			Stadium: White Hart Lane; Attendance: 59,780; Referee: PC Annette (Hampshire)

14 January 1950 25	Cardiff City	1–0	Bury	Cardiff
14:45	Roley Williams			Stadium: Ninian Park; Attendance: 27,883; Referee: Alf Bond (Fulham)

21 January 1950 26	Leicester City	1–0	Cardiff City	Leicester
	Ken Chisholm 2'			Stadium: Filbert Street; Attendance: 27,300; Referee: RS Lloyd (Oswestry)

4 February 1950 27	Cardiff City	1–2	Bradford	Cardiff
15:00	Elfed Evans		Jack Haines; Bob Crosbie	Stadium: Ninian Park; Attendance: 25,164; Referee: Alf Bond (Fulham)

18 February 1950 28	Chesterfield	0–1	Cardiff City	Chesterfield
			Elfed Evans	Stadium: Saltergate; Attendance: 15,042; Referee: Joe McCann (Preston)

25 February 1950 29	Cardiff City	1–0	Leeds United	Cardiff
15:15	Elfed Evans 66'			Stadium: Ninian Park; Attendance: 28,423; Referee: William Rogers (Birmingham)

4 March 1950 30	Southampton	3–1	Cardiff City	Southampton
15:00	Eric Day 5'; Jimmy McGowan 11'; Ted Bates 72'		11' Elfed Evans	Stadium: The Dell; Attendance: 23,475; Referee: EPL Greig

11 March 1950 31	Cardiff City	1–0	Coventry City	Cardiff
15:15	George Edwards 22'			Stadium: Ninian Park; Attendance: 22,875; Referee: Jack Clough (Bolton)

18 March 1950 32	Luton Town	0–0	Cardiff City	Luton
15:15		Luton report		Stadium: Kenilworth Road; Attendance: 15,071; Referee: Roland Burgess (Reading)

25 March 1950 33	Cardiff City	3–0	Barnsley	Cardiff
15:15	Gordon Pallister (o.g.); Elfed Evans; Wilf Grant			Stadium: Ninian Park; Attendance: 19,987; Referee: SV Davis

1 April 1950 34	Grimsby Town	0–0	Cardiff City	Grimsby
15:15				Stadium: Blundell Park; Attendance: 14,922; Referee: HC Williams (Fulham)

7 April 1950 35	Brentford	1–0	Cardiff City	London
	Jackie Goodwin 15'			Stadium: Griffin Park; Attendance: 24,584; Referee: WJ Edwards (Yeovil)

8 April 1950 36	Cardiff City	4–0	Queens Park Rangers	Cardiff
15:15	Alf Sherwood; Elfed Evans; Elfed Evans; Arthur Lever			Stadium: Ninian Park; Attendance: 21,102; Referee: Lewis Webb (Bath)

10 April 1950 37	Cardiff City	0–0	Brentford	Cardiff
15:15				Stadium: Ninian Park; Attendance: 16,260; Referee: WJ Edwards (Yeovil)

15 April 1950 38	West Ham United	0–1	Cardiff City	London
15:00			Arthur Lever	Stadium: Upton Park; Attendance: 14,109; Referee: SV Davis

17 April 1950 39	Cardiff City	1–1	Southampton	Cardiff
18:15	George Edwards 35'		25' Charlie Wayman	Stadium: Ninian Park; Attendance: 21,247

22 April 1950 40	Cardiff City	1–2	Sheffield United	Cardiff
15:15	Arthur Lever 17'		16', 36' George Jones	Stadium: Ninian Park; Attendance: 33,382; Referee: Roland (RJ) Burgess (Reading)

29 April 1950 41	Preston North End	3–0	Cardiff City	Preston
	Glyn Williams (o.g.); Harry Anders; Tom Finney			Stadium: Deepdale; Attendance: 13,799; Referee: RS Lloyd (Oswestry)

6 May 1950 42	Hull City	1–1	Cardiff City	Hull
15:15	Jimmy Lee		Ted Gorin	Stadium: Boothferry Park; Attendance: 18,213; Referee: WHE Evans (Liverpool)

=== FA Cup ===
7 January 1950 Round 3	Cardiff City	2–2	West Bromwich Albion	Cardiff
14:15	Elfed Evans 13'; Glyn Williams 85'		40' Gordon Inwood; 41' Cyril Williams	Stadium: Ninian Park; Attendance: 38,000; Referee: RC Carter (Swindon)

11 January 1950 Round 3 (Replay)	West Bromwich Albion	0–1	Cardiff City	West Bromwich
			George Edwards	Stadium: The Hawthorns; Attendance: 37,400; Referee: RC Carter (Swindon)

28 January 1950 Round 4	Charlton Athletic	1–1	Cardiff City	London
14:45	Charlie Vaughan 54'		Elfed Evans	Stadium: The Valley; Attendance: 46,000; Referee: Harry Holt (Rochdale)

1 February 1950 Round 4 (Replay)	Cardiff City	2–0	Charlton Athletic	Cardiff
14:15	Elfed Evans; Elfed Evans			Stadium: Ninian Park; Attendance: 37,000; Referee: Harry Holt (Rochdale)

11 February 1950 Round 5	Leeds United	3–1	Cardiff City	Leeds
	Harold Williams 9'; David Cochrane 11'; Ray Iggleden 64'		16' (pen.) Alf Sherwood	Stadium: Elland Road; Attendance: 53,099; Referee: William Rogers (Birmingham)

=== Welsh Cup ===
18 January 1950 Round 6	Cardiff City	3–0	Ebbw Vale	Cardiff
	George Edwards; George Edwards; Billy Baker			Stadium: Ninian Park; Attendance: 2,500

23 February 1950 Round 7	Swansea Town	3–0	Cardiff City	Swansea
15:00	Stan Richards; Frank Scrine; Frank Scrine			Stadium: Vetch Field; Attendance: 11,000; Referee: WP Hopkins (Llanelli)

== See also ==
- List of Cardiff City F.C. seasons
