= Pat Parker (footballer) =

English footballer

Personal information
- Full name: Patrick John Parker
- Date of birth: 15 July 1929
- Place of birth: Bow, Devon, England
- Date of death: 28 January 2014 (aged 84)
- Place of death: Southampton, England
- Height: 6 ft 1 in (1.85 m)
- Position: Centre half

Youth career
- Bere Alston

Senior career*
Years	Team	Apps	(Gls)
1949–1950	Plymouth Argyle		
1950–1951	Newton Abbot		
1951–1959	Southampton	132	(0)
1959–1960	Poole Town		
1960–1978	Cowes Sports		
- * Club domestic league appearances and goals

Patrick John Parker (15 July 1929 – 28 January 2014) was an English professional footballer who played at centre half for Southampton in the 1950s.

== Playing career ==
Parker was born in Bow, Devon and after his national service in the Royal Air Force he joined Plymouth Argyle as an amateur in 1949. He failed to make the grade at Argyle and was playing for Newton Abbot on a part-time basis, where he was spotted by Southampton when the clubs met in a pre-season friendly. Manager Sid Cann signed Parker in August 1951 and, after a few reserve team matches, he made his first team debut away to Leicester City on 3 September 1951. His early career was blighted by broken legs, firstly in a pre-season friendly against his former club in 1952 and then a year later in another friendly against an RAF team.

He eventually overcame these difficulties and in April 1954 he replaced Stan Clements at the heart of Saints' defence. He retained his place for the start of the following season before losing out to Len Wilkins. He continued to turn out regularly for the reserves and in turn replaced Wilkins in the centre for the first team; in 1956–57 he was ever-present and his "sterling performances in the heart of the Southampton defence" earned him Divisional representational honours. He was selected to play for the Third Division South team in 1955–56 and 1956–57.

After 145 games for the Saints, he was transfer listed in 1959 and moved on a free transfer to Poole Town, along with Southampton teammates Bryn Elliott, Sam Stevens and Barry Hillier. After a year with Poole, he moved to the Isle of Wight to join Cowes Sports starting a long association with the Cowes club, where he became manager in 1961, continuing to play until 1978.

After retiring from full-time professional football, he worked as a production controller before becoming a sales administrator for International Computers Limited. He lived in Southampton for the rest of his life and died on 28 January 2014.
