= Brian Clifton (footballer) =

English footballer (1934–2020)

Personal information
- Full name: Brian Clifton
- Date of birth: 15 March 1934
- Place of birth: Whitchurch, Hampshire, England
- Date of death: 12 January 2020 (aged 85)
- Height: 5 ft 11 in (1.80 m)
- Positions: Inside forward; half-back

Youth career
- Andover
- Whitchurch United
- Portals Athletic

Senior career*
Years	Team	Apps	(Gls)
1953–1962	Southampton	111	(35)
1962–1966	Grimsby Town	104	(5)
1966–1969	Boston United		
1969–1970	Gainsborough Trinity		
1970–1973	Boston		
- * Club domestic league appearances and goals

Brian Clifton (15 March 1934 – 12 January 2020) was an English footballer who played at either inside-forward or half-back for Southampton and Grimsby Town in the 1950s and 1960s.

== Football career ==
Clifton was born in Whitchurch, Hampshire and played football for Hampshire Schools as well as for various local clubs in the Hampshire League, while serving his apprenticeship at the Portals papermill at Laverstoke. While playing for Whitchurch United he was spotted by Stan Woodhouse, who had played for Southampton in the 1920s and 1930s.

He joined Southampton in 1952, making his debut in the reserves on 3 January 1953. He signed for Southampton in February 1953, shortly before his 19th birthday and continued to make occasional appearances for the reserves over the next four years. His football career was interrupted by his National service, which he spent with the Royal Air Force, and it was not until 28 September 1957 that he made his first-team debut when he took the place of Derek Reeves at centre-forward for a Third Division South match against Brighton & Hove Albion. Clifton scored twice with a lob and a header as the "Saints" won 5–0. Clifton retained his place at centre-forward for the next six matches, with Reeves returning at inside-left, and scored another brace in a 7–0 rout of Bournemouth on 5 October. In November, he lost his place to Reeves, with Don Roper returning at inside-right, after which he only made five further appearances in 1957–58, this time at inside-right.

Over the next three seasons, Clifton was in and out of the side, playing in various positions in the forward line or as a wing-half, although he did score eight goals from his eight appearances at inside-left in 1959–60. It was not until 1961–62 (with Southampton now in the Second Division) that he became a settled member of the side, playing the entire season at right-half until April when he was switched back to the forward line, with Ken Wimshurst taking over at right-half.

Following the signing of Ian White in the summer of 1962, Clifton only made four further appearances before he was sold to Grimsby Town for £8,000 in October 1962.

At Grimsby, he joined fellow new signings, centre-forward George McLean (signed from Norwich City) and inside-forward Ron Foster (from Leyton Orient), as Grimsby tried to establish themselves in the Second Division. Now playing regularly at centre-half, Clifton became the team captain but he was unable to prevent the "Mariners" being relegated in 1964. He remained with Grimsby until the summer of 1966, before dropping down to non-league football.

He then joined Boston United of the West Midlands (Regional) League, helping them to become champions in 1967, before spells with Gainsborough Trinity and Boston.

== Later career ==
Following his retirement from football, Clifton remained in Lincolnshire, where he worked as a draughtsman for a frozen food company in Grimsby until his retirement. He then settled in the nearby village of Holton-le-Clay.

== Death ==
On 12 January 2020, he died at the age of 85, with both Southampton and Grimsby Town paying tribute to their former player.

== Honours ==
Southampton

- Football League Third Division champions: 1959–60

Boston United

- West Midlands (Regional) League champions: 1966–67
