= Alex Simpson =

Scottish footballer

Personal information
- Full name: Alexander Simpson
- Date of birth: 24 November 1924
- Place of birth: Glasgow, Scotland
- Date of death: 16 June 2008 (aged 83)
- Height: 5 ft 11 in (1.80 m)
- Position: Half back

Youth career
- Benburb

Senior career*
Years	Team	Apps	(Gls)
1947–1949	Wolverhampton Wanderers	2	(0)
1949–1952	Notts County	74	(6)
1952–1955	Southampton	68	(1)
1955–1958	Shrewsbury Town	100	(4)
1958–????	Nuneaton Borough		
- * Club domestic league appearances and goals

Alexander Simpson (24 November 1924 – 16 June 2008) was a Scottish professional footballer who played as a half back for Notts County, Southampton and Shrewsbury Town in the 1950s.

== Playing career ==
=== Early career ===
Simpson was born in Glasgow and as a youth played for Benburb before joining Wolverhampton Wanderers in January 1947. He only made two First Division appearances for the Wolves before moving to Third Division (South) Notts County in October 1949. He made 76 appearances for Notts County between 1949 and 1952, scoring on seven occasions and he also collected a Championship medal in 1950.

=== Southampton ===
In November 1952, he was transferred to Second Division Southampton, with Jack Edwards moving to Meadow Lane. According to Holley & Chalk, he "had an excellent temperament" and was made club captain soon after his arrival.

On 28 February 1953, he broke an ankle playing at Brentford. Saints had spent most of the season in the relegation zone, but Simpson's replacement, former club captain Stan Clements was not able to lead the team to safety and they dropped to the Third Division (South) for the first time since 1922.

Simpson recovered in time for the start of the next season, but in October he lost his place to newly arrived Robert McLaughlin. Simpson regained his place for five matches at the end of the season, and in 1954-55 he was initially ever-present, scoring his only goal for the Saints with a header against Reading at The Dell on 2 October 1954. Whilst scoring the goal, he was knocked unconscious, but recovered in time for the next match. In mid-March, he was replaced by Bryn Elliott and in the summer of 1955 he was offered a free transfer. In his three years with the Saints, he made a total of 75 appearances, scoring once.

=== Later career ===
In June 1955, he was transferred to fellow Third Division South side Shrewsbury Town, where he continued to give good service, making over 100 appearances in three years.

He then returned to the Wolverhampton area, where he joined the family fish and chips business, turning out occasionally for Nuneaton Borough. He later retired to south Devon, and died on 16 June 2008.

== Honours ==
Notts County

- Football League Third Division South champions: 1949–50
