= Walter Judd =

Walter Judd may refer to:

- Walter Judd (politician), American politician and physician
- Walter Judd (footballer), English footballer
- Walter Stephen Judd, American botanist and taxonomist
