= Jackie Roberts =

Welsh footballer

Personal information
- Full name: John Hopkin Roberts
- Date of birth: 30 June 1918
- Place of birth: Swansea, Wales
- Date of death: June 2001 (aged 82–83)
- Place of death: Swansea, Wales
- Position: Full back

Youth career
- –1936: Cwmbwria Juniors

Senior career*
Years	Team	Apps	(Gls)
1936–1950	Bolton Wanderers	162	(19)
1945	→ Chelmsford City (guest)	2	(3)
1950–1951	Swansea City	16	(1)
1951–1952	Llanelli		
Total		180	(23)

International career
- Wales Schools
1949	Wales	1	(0)
- * Club domestic league appearances and goals

John Hopkin Roberts (30 June 1918 – June 2001) was a Welsh professional footballer who made over 160 appearances in the Football League for Bolton Wanderers as a full back. He won one cap for Wales at international level.

== Personal life ==
He grew up on Alice Street in Swansea, being a neighbour of fellow future Welsh internationals Ernie Jones, Mel Nurse, John Charles and Mel Charles.

Roberts served in 53rd (Bolton) Field Regiment, Royal Artillery, during the Second World War. He was injured in the eye by shrapnel in Italy and was evacuated back to Britain.
