= Tom Lowder =

English footballer (1924-1999)

Personal information
- Full name: Thomas William Lowder
- Date of birth: 24 November 1924
- Place of birth: Worksop, England
- Date of death: 15 May 1999 (aged 74)
- Place of death: Boston, Lincolnshire, England
- Position: Outside forward

Senior career*
Years	Team	Apps	(Gls)
1946–1947	Crystal Palace	0	(0)
1947–1949	Rotherham United	8	(5)
1949	Boston United	9	(5)
1949–1953	Southampton	39	(2)
1953–1954	Southend United	21	(3)
1954–1960	Boston United	237	(53)
1960–1961	Skegness Town		
1961–1962	Boston United	4	(0)
- * Club domestic league appearances and goals

Thomas William Lowder (24 November 1924 – 15 May 1999) was an English footballer who played as an outside-forward in the 1950s, spending most of his career with Boston United as well as playing in the Football League with Rotherham United, Southampton and Southend United.

== Football career ==
Lowder was born in Worksop, Nottinghamshire, but started his football career in London with Crystal Palace, whom he joined as an amateur in September 1946. He failed to make the first team with Palace and in August 1947, he joined Rotherham United where he spent two seasons in the Third Division North. He made his debut for the "Millers" on 4 December 1948, when he scored a hat-trick in an 8–1 win at Carlisle United. During his two years at the Millmoor club, Lowder managed only eight league appearances, in which he scored two further goals as Rotherham finished both seasons as runners-up, missing out on the single promotion place.

He was allowed to leave Rotherham in the 1949 close season when he signed up with Boston United. He played nine games and scored five goals whilst playing on the left wing before he was transferred to Southampton for £1500 in October. Southampton's manager, Sid Cann, had gone to Boston to look at Bryn Elliott in a Midland League match but he was so impressed with Lowder's fast wing play that he signed both players.

He made his debut for the "Saints" at Chesterfield on 26 November 1949, when he took the place of Welsh international Ernie Jones for one match, but it was not until January that he had a run of matches, when Jones was out injured. Jones regained his place at the start of April and Lowder returned to the reserves. In the following season, Lowder vied for the outside-left position with Jack Edwards and John Mitchell, making only three appearances. Lowder eventually displaced Edwards in December 1951 and retained his place for the remainder of the 1951–52 season. An attack of peritonitis restricted his appearances the following season to just six and in May 1953 he agreed to join Southend United in search of regular football. In his four years at The Dell, Lowder made only 39 appearances, scoring twice.

Lowder spent one season with Southend, in which he made a total of 22 appearances with three goals before returning to Boston in June 1954.

At Boston, he was snapped up by Ray Middleton at the start of the 1954–55 Midland League season and became a fixture in the Boston United side over the next six years, rarely missing a match. In his first season, playing mostly at inside-left, Lowder scored 19 goals in 45 games as Boston finished fifth in the Midland League. He also played in all seven FA Cup matches and scored six goals.

The following season, he made all his appearances at left-half, with 40 games in the league (four goals) and all four FA Cup matches (one goal). He played in the club's FA cup run of 1955–56 which culminated with a 6–1 victory at Derby County, then playing in Third Division North. This was a record away win by a non-league team against League opponents in the FA Cup. this set up a Third round match against Spurs of the Football League First Division at White Hart Lane, which was lost 4–0. Boston finished the 1955–56 season as runners-up in the Midland League.

In 1956–57, Lowder played in every first team game for Boston, 46 league games with six goals, two FA Cup matches and two in the Lincolnshire Senior Cup followed by 43 league (six goals) and three FA Cup matches in the following season. In 1958–59, Boston joined the Southern League (North-Western Section) finishing in third place, with Lowder missing only one match.

He left Boston to play for Skegness Town for the 1960–61 season, but briefly returned to Boston for a few games in the 1961–62 season. At Skegness, he played alongside the comedian, Charlie Williams.

== Later career ==
Lowder settled in Boston and, after finishing his playing career, he ran an off-licence and grocery store, from which he retired in June 1990. He died in Boston in May 1999 aged 74.
