= Sam Stevens (footballer) =

Scottish footballer

Personal information
- Full name: Samuel Batson Stevens
- Date of birth: 2 December 1935 (age 90)
- Place of birth: Rutherglen, Scotland
- Height: 6 ft 0 in (1.83 m)
- Position: Wing-half

Senior career*
Years	Team	Apps	(Gls)
- Queen's Park
1956–1957	Airdrieonians		
1957–1959	Southampton	14	(0)
1959–1961	Poole Town		
1961–1967	Andover		
1967–1969	Portals Athletic		
1989–19??	Swaythling Athletic		

Managerial career
- 1989–19??: Swaythling Athletic
- * Club domestic league appearances and goals

Samuel Batson Stevens (born 2 December 1935) is a Scottish retired professional footballer who played as a wing-half in the Football League for Southampton in the late 1950s.

== Football career ==
Stevens was born in Rutherglen, South Lanarkshire and educated at the Rutherglen Academy, representing Glasgow Schools at football.

His football career started at Queen's Park before he was "called up" for his national service which was spent with the Royal Corps of Signals as a Physical Training instructor. In April 1956, he guested for Southampton in a friendly match in which he impressed the "Saints" manager Ted Bates.

On completing his National Service, Stevens returned to Scotland and signed for Airdrieonians in November 1956. In the summer of 1957, he was Ted Bates's only new signing for the start of the 1957–58 season, when he joined Southampton on a free transfer. Described as a "good sportsman and whole-hearted left-back", he spent his first season at The Dell in the reserves.

His first-team debut came in a Football League Third Division match at Chesterfield on 25 August 1958, when he played at left-half in a 3–3 draw. His debut was described as "sound" and part of a "strong defensive display" from which he emerged "with great credit". For the remainder of the season, he alternated with Bobby McLaughlin at No. 6 until Terry Simpson was promoted from the youth team. Stevens' final appearance was in a 6–0 home defeat by Brentford on 9 March 1959; this remains Southampton's biggest home defeat.

He was released in the summer of 1959 and was one of several players recruited by former Southampton player, Mike Keeping to join Poole Town of the Southern League, along with Bryn Elliott, Pat Parker and Barry Hillier. After two years at Poole, Stevens moved to Andover, for whom he played for six years, followed by two years with Portals Athletic before becoming player-manager at Swaythling Athletic in 1959.

== Later career ==
He continued to be involved with the "Saints" helping Lew Chatterley coach the youth team between 1990 and 1995. He later worked for the Sports Council and the Hampshire F.A. in a sports development role.
