= Gordon Pallister =

English footballer

Personal information
- Date of birth: 2 April 1917
- Place of birth: Howden-le-Wear, England
- Date of death: 24 November 1999 (aged 82)
- Place of death: Barnsley, England
- Height: 5 ft 10 in (1.78 m)
- Position: Left back

Youth career
- Willington Juniors

Senior career*
Years	Team	Apps	(Gls)
1934–1938	Bradford City	28	(0)
1938–1952	Barnsley	220	(3)
Total		248	(3)
- * Club domestic league appearances and goals

Gordon Pallister (2 April 1917 – 24 November 1999) was an English professional footballer who played as a left back.

== Career ==
Born in Howden-le-Wear, Pallister joined Bradford City from Willington Juniors in May 1934. He made 28 league and 3 FA Cup appearances for the club. He moved to Barnsley in October 1938, making a further 220 league appearances for them before retiring in 1952.

== Sources ==
- Frost, Terry (1988). Bradford City A Complete Record 1903-1988. Breedon Books Sport. ISBN 0-907969-38-0.
