= Portals Athletic F.C. =

- Full name: Portals Athletic Football Club
- Founded: 1927
- Dissolved: 1987
- Ground: Batts Meadow, Laverstoke Park, Nr Whitchurch, Hampshire.
Home colours	Away colours

Portals Athletic were an amateur football team based between the north Hampshire towns of Overton and Whitchurch. The club ran for 60 years until the loss of the sudden loss of their financial backing in 1987.

== History ==
Portals Athletic FC were founded in 1927 as the works side of the Laverstoke Paper Mill, taking their name from the owners Portals Limited, and initially played in the local Basingstoke League where they enjoyed plenty of success - most notably in 1937 when they won the Hampshire Junior 'A' Cup.

In 1967 Portals were elected to Hampshire League Division 3 where they finished in a respectable mid-table final position. A year later the league was expanded and they were consequently placed in Division 3 West, where they finished 3rd before clinching promotion as runners-up in 1970. Portals quickly adapted well to life in what was then a highly competitive Division 2 and clinched a final position of 3rd which was enough to secure a second successive promotion. However, life in the top flight was tough for Portals and they were relegated straight back again.

The early eighties saw an upturn in fortunes with the team frequently challenging for promotion and performing well in their respective cup competitions, winning the North Hants Senior Cup in 1980. The following year saw them regain the trophy and also win the Hampshire Intermediate Cup, but just miss out on a unique treble after losing Aldershot Senior Cup final 1-3 against Hartley Wintney. The North Hants Senior Cup was lifted again, before finally, after several near misses, they were promoted in 1984 as champions. Portals then settled themselves in Division 1 for two seasons until in 1986 they (along with the league's top clubs with the required facilities) broke away to form the new Wessex League.

That inaugural season Portals finish in a steady 12th position but in June 1987 the parent company suddenly withdrew their support, forcing the club to sadly leave the competition and disband just after celebrating their 60th anniversary.

A phoenix side was immediately entered in the Basingstoke & District Sunday League where they played until 1997.

== Honours ==
- Hampshire League
  - Division 2 Champions 1983/84
  - Division 3 West Runners-up 1969/70
- Hampshire Football Association
  - Intermediate Cup Winners 1939/40 and 1980/81
  - Junior 'A' Cup Winners 1936/37
- North Hants Football Association
  - Senior Cup Winners 1979/80, 1980/81 and 1982/83
  - May Cup Winners 1947/48
- Aldershot Football Association
  - Senior Cup Finalists 1980/81
- Basingstoke & District League
  - Premier Division Champions 1964/65
  - Division 2 Champions 1970/71 (Reserves)
  - Junior 'A' Cup Winners 1935/36, 1948/49 and 1951/52

== League History 1967-87 ==
Season	Division	Position	Significant events
1967/68	Hampshire League Division 3	10/16	
1968/69	Hampshire League Division 3 West	3/14	
1969/70	Hampshire League Division 3 West	2/14	Runners-up, Promoted
1970/71	Hampshire League Division 2	3/16	Promoted
1971/72	Hampshire League Division 1	15/16	Relegated
1972/73	Hampshire League Division 2	10/16	
1973/74	Hampshire League Division 2	13/16	
1974/75	Hampshire League Division 2	10/16	
1975/76	Hampshire League Division 2	7/16	
1976/77	Hampshire League Division 2	11/16	
1977/78	Hampshire League Division 2	8/16	
1978/79	Hampshire League Division 2	8/16	
1979/80	Hampshire League Division 2	8/16	
1980/81	Hampshire League Division 2	3/20	
1981/82	Hampshire League Division 2	4/20	
1982/83	Hampshire League Division 2	4/20	
1983/84	Hampshire League Division 2	1/18	Champions, Promoted
1984/85	Hampshire League Division 1	17/20	
1985/86	Hampshire League Division 1	8/20	Left competition
1986/87	Wessex League	12/17	Left competition

== Ground ==
Portals Athletic played at Laverstoke Park, located alongside the B3400 between Whitchurch and Overton. After their untimely demise, the venue remained in use by the Sunday side until 1997. It was then leased to the short-lived Hampshire League side AFC Basingstoke.

== Notable players ==
In the early fifties, locally born Brian Clifton played for Portals before enjoying a long professional career with Southampton and Grimsby Town. The sixties saw the former Crystal Palace winger Bernard Harrison and Sam Stevens both play for the club. Latterly, the former Leicester City and Southampton defender Ian White played from 1968 to 1972 and for a spell was also their manager.

== Local rivalries ==
There are a number of clubs within the north Hants area, and neighbours Whitchurch United, Overton United and Malshanger (now defunct) were regarded as Portals' main rivals.
