= Mel Nurse =

Welsh footballer (born 1937)

Personal information
- Full name: Melvyn Tudor George Nurse
- Date of birth: 11 October 1937 (age 89)
- Place of birth: Swansea, Wales
- Position: Centre-back

Youth career
- 1952–1955: Swansea Town

Senior career*
Years	Team	Apps	(Gls)
1955–1962	Swansea Town	156	(9)
1962–1965	Middlesbrough	113	(8)
1965–1968	Swindon Town	123	(10)
1968–1971	Swansea City	98	(3)
- Pembroke Borough
- Bury Town
- Merthyr Tydfil

International career
1960–1961	Wales	12	(0)
- * Club domestic league appearances and goals

Melvyn Tudor George Nurse (born 11 October 1937) is a Welsh former professional footballer. A centre-half, he started his career at his hometown club Swansea Town and made his professional debut in 1956. He joined Middlesbrough in 1962 for a club record fee of £25,000 and later played for Swindon Town. During his career, he also represented Wales at under-23 level and gained 12 caps at senior level.

After retiring from football, he built a property portfolio that included several hotels and businesses in the Swansea area before, rejoining the football club as a member of the board. In 2001, he led a consortium in a takeover that is credited with saving the club from financial ruin. His lifelong association with the city of Swansea has seen him often referred to as "Mr. Swansea".

== Early life ==
Nurse was born in a one-room apartment where his parents lived in the district of Fforestfach in Swansea in 1937. His parents, both from the Swansea area, soon moved to a two bedroom house with no electricity or central heating in Alice Street in the nearby area of Cwmbwrla. The outbreak of World War II in 1939 saw the area sustain heavy bombing due to the nearby Cwmfelin Steelworks and Nurse's father was called up for service during the hostilities, spending several years away from the family.

Several other notable footballers were raised in Alice Street including the Charles brothers: John and Mel, Jackie Roberts and Ernie Jones. The group all attended the same school and played football at the local park, using a tennis ball, as no local family could afford a football at the time. Nurse was active in numerous sports, taking part in long-jump and javelin as well as captaining his school's football and cricket teams. At the age of 14, he was selected to play for the Swansea schoolboys team and played matches for the side at Vetch Field. The following year, he was selected to play for Wales' schoolboys and played in a 3–3 draw with England at Wembley Stadium, the opposition side containing Bobby Charlton and Wilf McGuinness. Outside football, Nurse was also a keen carpenter and briefly worked as an apprentice for a local carpenter before his football career progressed.

== Club career ==
=== Swansea Town ===
Having represented Wales at schoolboy level, Nurse attracted attention from several clubs and was offered contracts with several sides, including Arsenal, Bristol Rovers and West Bromwich Albion, but rejected them all as he did not want to leave Swansea. In 1952, Glyn Evans, a scout for Swansea Town, travelled to Nurse's new family home in Penlan and offered him a place in the club's youth system. During this time, the club's youth players were also required to perform several other jobs, such as sweeping stands, moving turf and cleaning kits, only training twice a week and playing for the club's reserve side in the amateur Welsh leagues on weekends.

After impressing for the reserves, Nurse signed professional terms with the club in June 1955 before being handed his professional debut on 24 March 1956 in a 6–1 victory over Leicester City, following an injury to first choice Tom Kiley. He was informed of his debut by a local sports reporter, Les Bailey, who covered Swansea Town matches and lived nearby to him. His performances in the first-team convinced Swansea to drop Kiley from the side and also cancel a £5000 transfer deal for Cardiff City defender Stan Montgomery.

However, at the age of 18, Nurse was called up for his national service, being stationed in Worcester with the Royal Engineers. He represented his regiment in football, playing alongside Dave Mackay and against George Kirby. His unit was eventually moved to Hong Kong but, as Nurse was playing football for the regiment and occasionally for Swansea Town when he was granted leave, he was allowed to stay in the UK. After being promoted to corporal on completion of a ten-week training course, he was stationed in Fleet, Hampshire.

After completing his national service, Nurse was demobbed in April 1958 returned to Swansea and established himself in the first-team. He was ever-present during the 1959–60 season and, helped the club win the Welsh Cup in 1961. Shortly after the Munich air disaster, Welsh national team manager Jimmy Murphy was appointed caretaker manager of Manchester United. During the club's restructuring after the crash, they organised a friendly match against Swansea mainly to scout Nurse and his performance led them to offer £35,000 for him, but Swansea turned the offer down. However, two years later, Middlesbrough saw an offer of £25,000, a club record fee, accepted. Nurse wanted to remain in Wales, but the club made it clear he had no future there if he refused to move.

=== Later career ===
After signing for Middlesbrough on a wage of £25 a week, he made his debut against Grimsby Town in a 4–3 victory. Within a week of joining, he was made captain. During a night out in his time at Middlesbrough, Nurse was once mistaken for train robber Ronnie Biggs. He was pulled over by police and questioned before his real identity was established.

In 1965, Nurse became unsettled after the appointment of new manager Raich Carter and, with his wife homesick, Middlesbrough placed him on the transfer list. He moved back to the West Country, joining Swindon Town in August for £15,000. Appointed club captain, he made his debut in a 1–0 defeat to Hull City the following month.

Nurse left Swindon in September 1968 and returned to live in Swansea. He had considered retirement in order to focus on his business ventures but was approached by Swansea manager Billy Lucas who visited Nurse's mother's house, where he was staying with his wife until they could purchase their own home, having been told that Nurse was living in Swansea again.

Lucas departed the club the following year and was replaced by Roy Bentley who led the club to promotion from the Third Division in 1969. He remained with the club until 1971 when Bentley introduced afternoon training sessions, the players having previously only trained in the mornings. The move was designed to keep the club's younger players focused by allowing less free time but Nurse grew frustrated as he managed his business interests in the afternoons and decided to retire from playing.

Nurse played a dozen games for the Welsh national team, limited by the players of the side, including John Charles and Mike England.

== Non-playing career ==
During his playing career, Nurse invested in several Bed and breakfast hotels in the Oystermouth area of Swansea. He and his wife Marion had decided on the venture after traveling back to the city for the birth of their first child. He would go on to purchase several hotels in the town and also began developing properties in the area for resale. He later joined the board at Swansea City.

At the start of the 21st century, Swansea City was in crisis and was seeking a new owner. The difficult times saw an attempt to sack seven players, and in November 2001, Nurse resigned from the board. The following day, he bought the club's £801,000 debt from former owners Ninth Floor plc. On 19 January 2002, Swansea was finally sold, after a bitter stand-off with a consortium headed by Nurse which was supported by the majority of the club's fans. In order to raise the £300,000 required to remove chairman Tony Petty, Nurse secured loans against many of his own properties and did so having not seen the club's financial records beforehand.

His efforts in saving the club from folding were listed as one of the main factors when he was awarded the Freedom of the City in Swansea. He now runs a B&B Hotel in Swansea called Seahaven Hotel.

== Honours ==
Swansea Town

- Welsh Cup winner: 1961
