= Hylton Colliery =

Association football club in England

- Country: England
- Location: County Durham, North East England
- Commission date: 1900
- Decommission date: 1979

Thermal power station
- Primary fuel: Coal

Hylton Colliery, also known as Castletown Colliery, was a coal mine situated in Castletown, Sunderland. It was opened in 1900 and owned by Wearmouth Coal Company until 1947, after which it was taken over by the National Coal Board. It closed on 13 July 1979.

The miners at the colliery ran a cricket club, now known as Hylton Cricket Club. Its football club, Hylton Colliery Welfare, played in the Wearside League, and included players such as Augie Scott and Ernie Taylor. Its junior team featured future Sunderland and West Ham United players Harry Hooper and Bill Robinson.

== See also ==
- Category:Hylton Colliery Welfare F.C. players
