= Bill Molloy =

English footballer (1929–2020)

Personal information
- Full name: William George Molloy
- Date of birth: 28 August 1929
- Place of birth: Coventry, England
- Date of death: 10 January 2020 (aged 90)
- Place of death: Coventry, England
- Height: 5 ft 7 in (1.70 m)
- Position: Inside left

Youth career
- 1945–19??: Coventry City

Senior career*
Years	Team	Apps	(Gls)
1949–1950	Southampton	1	(0)
1950	Lockheed (Leamington)		
1950–1952	Newport County	3	(0)
1952	Millwall	0	(0)
1952–1953	Rugby Town		
1953–1954	Snowdown Colliery Welfare		
1954–1955	Canterbury City		
1955–1956	Dover		
1956–1957	Nuneaton Borough		
1957–19??	Bedworth United		
- * Club domestic league appearances and goals

William George Molloy (28 August 1929 – 10 January 2020) was an English professional footballer who played as an inside forward in the Football League for Southampton and Newport County between 1949 and 1951.

== Football career ==
Molloy was born in Coventry and played football as a youth with St. Osburg's Youth Club before joining Coventry City as a trainee in March 1945. Although Coventry City offered him a professional contract, he turned this down to join the Army.

His military career took him to Ludgershall in Wiltshire where he was spotted by a scout from Southampton. In 1949, he was invited to The Dell for a trial as a result of which he was offered a professional contract, which this time he accepted. He made his reserve-team debut on 21 September 1949, scoring against Ipswich Town. Two "stylish" goals in a reserve match against Brighton & Hove Albion two weeks later earned him a call-up for the first team.

His only first-team appearance came on 22 October 1949 when he took the place of Jack Edwards at inside-left against Blackburn Rovers. Although he started the move that led to the opening goal from Ted Bates in a 3–1 victory, for much of the rest of the game he was lacking pace and saw little of the ball. Molloy returned to the reserves, for whom he made 19 appearances, scoring six goals.

In the summer of 1950, he was transfer listed and attracted interest from Aston Villa, but they refused to meet the fee of £750 requested by manager Sid Cann. Molloy was eventually released from his contract and returned to the West Midlands, to take up employment with Lockheed at Leamington Spa in the maintenance department, playing football for the works team. In November 1950, he returned to the Football League with Newport County for whom he played three league matches in the 1950–51 season, and was briefly on the books of Millwall in 1952 before dropping down to non-League football.

After a season with Rugby Town in the Birmingham Combination, he moved to Kent where he played for Snowdown Colliery Welfare in the Kent League for a season, followed by a season each at Canterbury City and Dover. In 1956, he returned to the Midlands to join Nuneaton Borough of the Birmingham & District League before winding up his football career at Bedworth United.

== Later career ==
Outside football, he was a painter and decorator by trade working in the Coventry area until he retired.
