= Tommy McCulloch (footballer, born 1921) =

Scottish footballer

Personal information
- Full name: Thomas McCulloch
- Date of birth: 25 December 1921
- Place of birth: Glasgow, Scotland
- Date of death: 2 October 2001 (aged 79)
- Place of death: Lennoxtown, Scotland
- Position: Winger

Senior career*
Years	Team	Apps	(Gls)
1946–1948	Airdrie	40	(6)
1948–1949	Queen of the South	25	(4)
1949–1950	Northampton Town	2	(0)
1950–1954	Bradford City	109	(9)
1954–1955	Crewe Alexandra	28	(5)
1955	March Town United	?	(?)
Total		204	(24)
- * Club domestic league appearances and goals

Thomas McCulloch (25 December 1921 – 2 October 2001) was a Scottish professional footballer who played as a winger.

== Career ==
Born in Glasgow, McCulloch made 204 appearances in the League systems of Scotland and England for Airdrie, Queen of the South, Northampton Town, Bradford City and Crewe Alexandra between 1946 and 1955, scoring 24 goals.

He also played non-League football for March Town United.
