= Albert Stitfall =

Welsh footballer

Personal information
- Full name: Albert Edward Stitfall
- Date of birth: 7 July 1924
- Place of birth: Cardiff, Wales
- Date of death: 1998
- Place of death: Cardiff, Wales
- Position: Defender

Senior career*
Years	Team	Apps	(Gls)
1948–1952	Cardiff City	7	(1)
1952–1953	Torquay United	22	(1)
- * Club domestic league appearances and goals

Albert Edward Stitfall (7 July 1924 – 1998) was a Welsh professional footballer.

== Career ==
Stitfall was born in Cardiff, and joined his hometown side Cardiff City during the Second World War, later serving in the Royal Navy. On his return to Britain he continued to play for Cardiff, although never managing to establish himself in the first team. While at the club he also played alongside both of his brothers, Ron Stitfall would go on to become one of the club's all-time greats, making over 400 appearances, while Bob Stitfall would only ever go as far as the reserve side.

He left the club in 1952 to sign for Torquay United and, despite playing in nearly half of the club's games that season, he left the club at the end of the season never returning to league football.
