= Reginald Dare =

English footballer and cricketer (1921–1993)

Personal information
- Full name: Reginald Arthur Dare
- Born: 26 November 1921; Blandford Forum, Dorset, England
- Died: October 1993 (aged 71); Bournemouth, Dorset, England
- Height: 6 ft 0 in (1.83 m)
- Batting: Right-handed
- Bowling: Slow left-arm orthodox

Domestic team information
- Years: Team
- 1949–1954: Hampshire
- 1958–1963: Buckinghamshire

Career statistics
Competition	First-class
Matches	109
Runs scored	1,679
Batting average	12.25
100s/50s	1/3
Top score	109*
Balls bowled	15,229
Wickets	185
Bowling average	35.02
5 wickets in innings	5
10 wickets in match	–
Best bowling	6/28
Catches/stumpings	70/–
Source: Reginald Dare at Cricinfo
23 February 2010
Association football career
- Position: Centre-forward
Senior career*
Years	Team	Apps	(Gls)
?–1949	Alton	?	(?)
1949–1950	Southampton	0	(0)
1950–1951	Exeter City	6	(?)
1951–1957	Dorchester Town	?	(?)
- * Club domestic league appearances and goals

Reginald Arthur Dare (26 November 1921 — October 1993) was an English first-class cricketer and footballer. In first-class cricket, he was associated as a slow left-arm orthodox bowler for Hampshire, with Dare taking 185 wickets in 109 first-class matches for the county. As an association football centre-forward, he played for Alton, Dorchester Town, Exeter City, and Southampton.

== Cricket career ==
=== First-class cricket ===
Dare was born in November 1921 in Blandford Forum, Dorset. He made his debut in first-class cricket for Hampshire against Oxford University at Bournemouth in 1949, with Dare playing a second match that season against the Combined Services at Portsmouth. A slow left-arm orthodox bowler, he came into the Hampshire side when their elder spin bowlers such as Jim Bailey, Tom Dean and Gerry Hill were coming to the end of their careers. He established himself in the Hampshire side in 1950, making nineteen appearances. In these, he took 43 wickets at an average of 31.53; he claimed his maiden five wicket haul during the season against Oxford University, when he took 6 for 28, and later in the season he took 5 for 33 against Northamptonshire. The following season, Dare featured in just twelve matches and struggled to take wickets, claiming only 8 wickets at an average of 71.62. Despite his poor return in 1951, Hampshire persevered with him.

In 1952, Dare took 56 wickets at an average of 33.82 from 28 matches; just as he did in 1950, he took two five wicket hauls. During the season, he scored what would become his only first-class century, when he made an unbeaten 109 against Worcestershire. Across the season, he scored 628 runs at a batting average of 17.94, which was to be his most productive season with the bat. He played 27 matches in 1953, taking 44 wickets at an average of 34.27. Against Derbyshire, he notably made 74 runs in 43 minutes to guide Hampshire to a victory by four wickets. In 1954, he took a further 31 wickets from 21 matches, at an average of 32.41; he claimed one five wicket haul, with 5 for 49 against Derbyshire. With the emergence of spinners Mervyn Burden and Peter Sainsbury, Dare was released by Hampshire at the end of the 1954 season. In his 109 first-class matches for Hampshire, Dare took 185 wickets at an average of 35.02. With the bat, he scored 1,679 runs at an average of 12.25.

=== Club and minor counties cricket ===
Dare signed as the professional and coach for Torquay Cricket Club in November 1955, and in his first season he claimed over 100 wickets. In 1957, he was granted a benefit match by Torquay against Hampshire. His second season at Torquay yielded him 150 wickets and nearly 1,000 runs. Dare joined Wycombe Cricket Club in High Wycombe in 1958, and in the same season he made his debut in minor counties cricket for Buckinghamshire against Norfolk in the Minor Counties Championship. He played minor counties cricket for Buckinghamshire until 1963, making twenty appearances in the Minor Counties Championship.

== Football career ==
A centre-forward, Dare began his football career with Alton, playing for the club in the 1948–49 Hampshire Intermediate Cup. He was signed by Southampton ahead of the 1949–50 season, where he led the Southampton reserves during the season. He left Southampton after one season, having not featured in the first team, and was subsequently signed by Exeter for £250, following negotiations between Southampton manager Sid Cann and his contemporary at Exeter, George Roughton; Dare had initially declined the move, fearing it would interfere with his cricket career. He debuted for Exeter in a 4–2 victory against Brighton & Hove Albion in the 1950–51 season, but played just a single season at St James Park, after which he transferred to Dorchester Town, who competed in the Western Football League.

== Later life and death ==
Dare was persuaded to relocate from High Wycombe in 1974 to take up the post of head cricket coach and groundsman at King's College School in Wimbledon. He remained there until his retirement in 1986. Dare died in Bournemouth in October 1993. He was married to Doris, with the couple having one daughter.
