= Bob Gibson (footballer) =

English footballer (1927–1989)

Personal information
- Full name: Robert Henry Gibson
- Date of birth: 5 August 1927
- Place of birth: Ashington, Northumberland, England
- Date of death: March 1989 (aged 61–62)
- Position: Centre forward

Senior career*
Years	Team	Apps	(Gls)
–	Ashington		
1948–1949	Aberdeen	1	(0)
1949–1950	Hull City	12	(5)
1950–1951	Ashington		
1951–1955	Lincoln City	41	(20)
1955–1957	Peterborough United	55	(51)
1957–1959	Gateshead	49	(27)
1959–19??	Morpeth Town		
- * Club domestic league appearances and goals

Robert Henry Gibson (5 August 1927 – March 1989) was an English footballer who scored 52 goals from 102 appearances in the Football League playing for Hull City, Lincoln City and Gateshead. He also played in the Scottish League for Aberdeen, and played non-league football in England for Ashington, Peterborough United, for whom he scored 51 goals in 55 Midland League appearances, and for Morpeth Town. He played as a centre forward.
