= Ian White (footballer) =

Scottish footballer and manager

Personal information
- Full name: Ian Samuel White
- Date of birth: 20 December 1935 (age 90)
- Place of birth: Glasgow, Scotland
- Height: 5 ft 8 in (1.73 m)
- Position: Half-back

Youth career
- Port Glasgow Hibs

Senior career*
Years	Team	Apps	(Gls)
1954–1955	St Anthony's		
1955–1956	Petershill		
1956–1958	Celtic	0	(0)
1958–1962	Leicester City	47	(1)
1962–1967	Southampton	61	(5)
1967–1968	Hillingdon Borough		
1968–1972	Portals Athletic		

International career
- Scotland juniors

Managerial career
- 1968–1972: Portals Athletic
- 1975–19??: Swaythling Athletic
- * Club domestic league appearances and goals

Ian Samuel White (born 20 December 1935) is a Scottish former footballer who played as a half-back for Leicester City and Southampton in the 1950s and 1960s. His career started in his home city of Glasgow with Celtic, where he failed to break through into the first team, before moving to England to join Leicester City in 1958, followed by five years at Southampton, before dropping down to non-league football.

== Football career ==
White was born in Glasgow and played his youth football with Port Glasgow Hibs before joining Scottish Junior club St Anthony's in 1954, followed by a move to fellow Junior club Petershill in 1955. Having played as a junior international for Scotland, he signed for Celtic in April 1956.

He failed to make Celtic's first team in his two years at Celtic Park and in May 1958, he moved to England to join Leicester City of the Football League First Division. He had to wait until 7 November 1959 before he made his first-team debut when he took the place of Johnny Newman at right-half for the match against Sheffield Wednesday, which was won 2–0. White retained his place until mid-February, when he was replaced by Frank McLintock. Over the next few seasons, White was in-and-out of the side, with few opportunities to establish himself in the side resulting in a move to the south coast in the summer of 1962, having made a total of 54 appearances for the "Foxes".

He was transferred to Southampton of the Second Division for a fee of £15,000 in June 1962, where he was re-united with Tony Knapp who had played alongside him at centre-half at Leicester City until a transfer to Southampton in August 1961.

White made his debut for the "Saints" in the opening match of the 1962–63 season at right-half with Knapp at centre-half, a 2–1 defeat at Scunthorpe United. White played in eight of the first ten matches of the season, before losing out to Ken Wimshurst, although he did play three further matches, on the left, in April. In the next season, he and Wimshurst both had long runs at No.4, with White also making 11 appearances further forward at inside-left as manager Ted Bates attempted to build a side to gain promotion. In the event, the Saints finished fifth, their highest position since 1950, having scored 100 goals, yet conceding 73.

In the next two seasons, White made only occasional appearances, including the final ten matches of the 1965–66 season, when Southampton finished as runners-up to Manchester United to gain promotion to the First Division for the first time.

In Southampton's first season in the top flight, White played in the first five matches, before again losing his place to Wimshurst, after which he made only three further appearances for the Saints. Following the signing of fellow-Scotsman Hugh Fisher in March 1967, White was released in the summer of 1967.

== Future career ==
After leaving Southampton, White spent a season with Hillingdon Borough in the Southern League, before a broken ankle ended his full-time playing career. He then joined Portals Athletic as player-manager becoming general manager in 1973, before a spell as manager at Swaythling Athletic.

White settled in the Southampton area, initially running a sports shop in Totton, before setting up a graphic design business in Romsey.

== Honours ==
Southampton

- Football League Second Division runners-up: 1965–66
