= Jimmy Baldwin =

English footballer

Personal information
- Full name: James Baldwin
- Date of birth: 12 January 1922
- Place of birth: Blackburn, England
- Date of death: 1984 (aged 61–62)
- Position: Defender

Senior career*
Years	Team	Apps	(Gls)
1946–1950	Blackburn Rovers	88	(0)
1950–1956	Leicester City	180	(4)
1956–1957	Great Yarmouth Town		
1957–1960	Yeovil Town		
Total		268+	(4+)

Managerial career
- 1956–1957: Great Yarmouth Town (player-manager)
- 1957–1960: Yeovil Town (player-manager)
- * Club domestic league appearances and goals

James Baldwin (12 January 1922 – 1985) was an English professional footballer who made 268 appearances in the Football League playing as a defender for Blackburn Rovers and Leicester City. Baldwin then became player-manager of Eastern Counties League side Great Yarmouth Town, before leaving in 1957 to take the same role at Southern League side Yeovil Town.
