= Harry Cooke =

English footballer

Personal information
- Full name: William Henry Cooke
- Date of birth: 7 March 1919
- Place of birth: Oswestry, England
- Date of death: 1992 (aged 72–73)
- Position: Defender

Youth career
- 1938–1945: Bournemouth & Boscombe Athletic

Senior career*
Years	Team	Apps	(Gls)
1945–1946	Bournemouth & Boscombe Athletic	0	(0)
1946–1953	Luton Town	210	(4)
1953–1954	Shrewsbury Town	4	(0)
1954–1955	Watford	10	(0)
- Bedford Town
- * Club domestic league appearances and goals

William Henry Cooke (7 March 1919 – 1992) was an English professional footballer, best known as a player for Luton Town.

== Career ==
Cooke began his career with Bournemouth & Boscombe Athletic, but failed to play a league game for the south coast club before moving to Luton Town in 1946. Cooke was more of a success at Luton, making 228 appearances in all competitions before signing for Shrewsbury Town for the 1953–54 season. Joining Watford in 1954, Cooke played 10 games for the club during the 1954–55 season before transferring to Bedford Town.
