= George Smith (footballer, born 1919) =

English footballer

Personal information
- Full name: George Clarence Bassett Smith
- Date of birth: 24 March 1919
- Place of birth: Portsmouth, England
- Date of death: 21 December 2001 (aged 82)
- Place of death: Albury, New South Wales, Australia
- Height: 5 ft 8 in (1.73 m)
- Position: Half back

Youth career
- 1936–1937: Huddersfield Town
- 1937–1938: Southampton

Senior career*
Years	Team	Apps	(Gls)
1938–1950	Southampton	95	(1)
1950–1951	Crystal Palace	7	(0)
- * Club domestic league appearances and goals

George Clarence Bassett Smith (24 March 1919 – 21 December 2001) was an English footballer who played most of his professional career for Southampton in the period either side of World War II.

== Football career ==
Although he was born in Portsmouth and christened George Clarence Bassett, he was brought up in Guernsey by adoptive parents, who gave him the surname Smith. He played junior football in the Channel Islands for Guernsey Schools and Guernsey Rangers.

After a brief spell as an amateur with Huddersfield Town he joined Southampton as an amateur in October 1937, signing as a professional in July 1938. His tenacious displays for the reserves earned him the nickname "Guernsey Terrier" from his teammates. His hard-working style of play eventually earned him a place in the first team and he made his debut on 4 February 1939 (away to West Bromwich Albion), replacing the injured Frank Hill. He had a run of nine appearances before Hill returned. His career was then interrupted by the suspension of football following the outbreak of World War II.

During the war he saw active service with the RAF as a rear gunner and then as an instructor, before returning to The Dell after he was de-mobbed.

He then enjoyed a couple of seasons as a regular, either at right-half or left-half, before losing his place in October 1948 to the young Len Wilkins. He never made another first-team appearance and was released at the end of the 1948–49 season.

He joined Crystal Palace in May 1950 where he played only seven games. He then retired from professional football and played non-league football for Dartford and King's Lynn, before joining the latter club as a coach in 1955. He later coached Braintree Town FC, Essex, commuting from his home at Hunstanton, Norfolk.

== Later career ==
In 1958, he and his family emigrated to Australia where he settled in Albury, New South Wales, finding employment as an ambulance driver and then working for a gas company, while helping to establish the Albury, Wodonga and Lavington Soccer Association.

He was also a trainer and physiotherapist with Albury Football Club (Australian rules).

He died in December 2001, aged 82.
