= Bobby Veck =

English footballer (1920-1999)

Personal information
- Full name: Robert Veck
- Date of birth: 1 April 1920
- Place of birth: Titchfield, England
- Date of death: 14 May 1999 (aged 79)
- Place of death: Canterbury, England
- Height: 5 ft 7 in (1.70 m)
- Position: Outside left

Youth career
- 1938–1939: Southampton

Senior career*
Years	Team	Apps	(Gls)
1945–1950	Southampton	23	(2)
1950–1951	Gillingham	36	(12)
1951–1952	Chelmsford City		
1952–????	Canterbury City		
- * Club domestic league appearances and goals

Robert Veck (1 April 1920 – 14 May 1999) was an English footballer who played, mainly at outside left, for Southampton and Gillingham in the years after the Second World War.

== Playing career ==
=== Southampton ===
Veck was born in Titchfield, Hampshire and was a member of Southampton's nursery side in 1938, scoring 14 goals in 11 junior League and Cup matches, before the war interrupted his football career.

During the war, he joined the Royal Air Force, and his military career initially took him across Britain, where he made guest appearances for several clubs, including Leeds United, Bradford Park Avenue, St Johnstone and York City. After spending time at Yeadon and Church Fenton (both in Yorkshire), he was sent out to Egypt for the duration of the war. Whilst in Egypt, he played for the United Services team and also for the Egyptian Railways.

Following his demobilisation, he returned to Southampton in late 1945, playing in the League South in 1945–46, scoring five goals from 28 appearances, plus one in the FA Cup. For the opening match of the first season of League football after the war, Veck was one of eight players making his League debut in the Second Division for Southampton, scoring in a 4–0 victory over Swansea Town, with fellow debutant Doug McGibbon scoring a hat-trick. Veck retained his place at outside left for the first seven matches of the season, before being replaced by Wilf Grant, who in turn gave way to Eric Day as manager Bill Dodgin was assembling a team to try to gain promotion from the Second Division.

Veck reclaimed the No. 11 shirt at the end of the season, but in 1947–48 only made six appearances as Dodgin tried five players at outside left before settling on Grant. Over the next few seasons, Veck only made the occasional appearance including replacing centre forward Charlie Wayman for two matches in April 1949 and again in February 1950, scoring in a 1–1 draw against Coventry City.

In July 1950, Veck was transferred to Gillingham for £3000. During his four League seasons at The Dell, Veck made 23 League and 4 FA Cup appearances, scoring three goals. In three of those seasons, the "Saints" narrowly missed promotion, finishing third in 1947–48, a feat repeated the following season (despite having an 8-point lead with 8 games to play) whilst in 1949–50 they were to be denied promotion by 0.06 of a goal, missing out on second place to Sheffield United.

=== Gillingham ===
At Gillingham, Veck spent one season as a virtual fixture on the left, either on the wing or at left back, making 36 appearances in the Third Division South scoring twelve goals, of which five were penalties.

He dropped out of League football in 1951, spending a season with Chelmsford City in the Southern League, before moving back to Kent where he joined Canterbury City in the Kent League, helping them win the Kent Senior Cup in 1954.
