= Howden-le-Wear =

Village in County Durham, England

Coordinates: 54.695°N 1.752°W

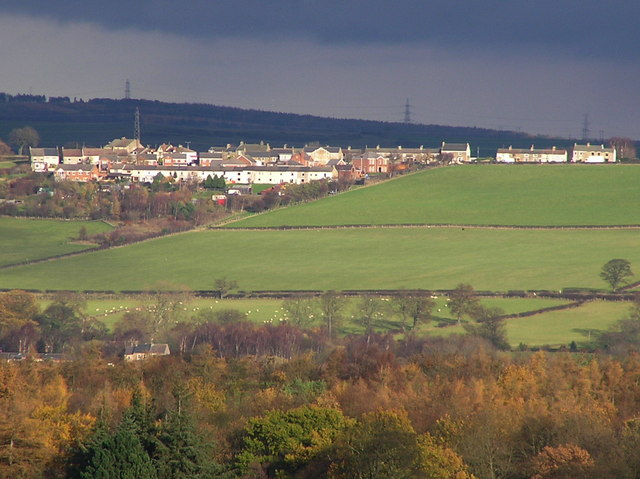
- Howden-le-Wear

- Location within County Durham
- OS grid reference: NZ161334
- Unitary authority: County Durham
- Ceremonial county: County Durham
- Region: North East
- Country: England
- Sovereign state: United Kingdom
- Post town: CROOK
- Postcode district: DL15
- Dialling code: 01388
- Police: Durham
- Fire: County Durham and Darlington
- Ambulance: North East
- UK Parliament: North West Durham

Howden-le-Wear is a village in County Durham, in England. Howden-le-Wear is approximately 1 mile south of the large market town of Crook. It has a number of shops including the village One Stop convenience store, hairdressers, butchers and the petrol station. The 2011 Census reported that Howden has a population of 1,535.
