= Frank Scrine =

Welsh footballer

Personal information
- Full name: Francis Henry Scrine
- Date of birth: 9 January 1925
- Place of birth: Wales
- Date of death: 5 October 2001 (aged 76)
- Place of death: Wales
- Position: Forward

Senior career*
Years	Team	Apps	(Gls)
1947–1954	Swansea Town	142	(45)
1954–?	Oldham Athletic	78	(21)

International career
1949–1950	Wales	2	(0)
- * Club domestic league appearances and goals

Frank Scrine (9 January 1925 – 5 October 2001) was a Welsh international football forward. He was part of the Wales national football team between 1949 and 1950, playing 2 matches. He played his first match on 15 October 1949 against England and his last match on 8 March 1950 against Ireland. At club level, he played for Swansea Town between 1947 and 1954, playing 142 matches, scoring 45 goals. He moved to Oldham Athletic and was the topscorer for the team in the 1953–54 season with 9 goals.

After leaving the English football league he played in the Welsh Football League with Llanelli, Ammanford, Milford United, Haverfordwest County and Bettws. He was a foreman at AWCO in Swansea, then a caretaker in the St David's Centre in Swansea and died on 5 October 2001.

== See also ==
- List of Wales international footballers (alphabetical)
