= Charlie Vaughan (footballer) =

English footballer

Personal information
- Full name: Charles John Vaughan
- Date of birth: 23 April 1921
- Place of birth: Bermondsey, England
- Date of death: 16 March 1989 (aged 67)
- Place of death: Sutton, London, England
- Position: Centre forward

Senior career*
Years	Team	Apps	(Gls)
1941–1946	Sutton United	147	(248)
1946–1953	Charlton Athletic	227	(91)
1953–1954	Portsmouth	26	(14)
1954–19??	Bexleyheath & Welling		

International career
1952	England B	1	(0)
- * Club domestic league appearances and goals

Charles John Vaughan (23 April 1921 – 16 March 1989) was an English footballer who played for Charlton Athletic and Portsmouth as a centre forward during the 1940s and 1950s.

Vaughan started his career with Sutton United. He helped them win numerous wartime honours, scored 42 league goals in the 1945–46 season to win the Athenian League, and finished his Sutton United career with 248 goals in 147 competitive appearances. He was inducted into the club's Hall of Fame.

In 1950, Vaughan toured Canada with a Football Association party, and in March 1952, he appeared in an England B international against the Netherlands.
