= Ron Stitfall =

Welsh footballer

Personal information
- Full name: Ronald Frederick Stitfall
- Date of birth: 14 December 1925
- Place of birth: Cardiff, Wales
- Date of death: 22 June 2008 (aged 82)
- Place of death: Cardiff, Wales
- Position: Defender

Senior career*
Years	Team	Apps	(Gls)
1947–1963	Cardiff City	402	(8)

International career
1952–1957	Wales	2	(0)
- * Club domestic league appearances and goals

Ronald Frederick Stitfall (14 December 1925 – 22 June 2008) was a Welsh professional footballer and Wales international. A one club man he played his entire career for his hometown club Cardiff City.

== Career ==
Born in Cardiff, Stitfall was a keen Cardiff City fan, often attending games at Ninian Park before going on to join the club in 1939, making his debut in a wartime friendly at the age of 14 against Swansea Town. He went on to feature in several friendlies for the club before serving in the army for four years during World War II. He eventually returned to play for Cardiff in 1947 and made his professional debut for the club in October 1947 when he started a match against Bradford City at left-back in place of Alf Sherwood who was away on international duty for Wales. The match finished 0-0 due to Stitfall making a last minute goal line clearance to save a point for the Bluebirds.

In his first few years at Cardiff he played in numerous positions, including scoring five times during a spell wearing the number nine shirt as a striker during the 1949–50 season. Despite this, he scored just eight league goals during his entire league career. For over a decade he formed a formidable full back pairing with another Cardiff City great and Wales international in Alf Sherwood, who eventually left the club in 1955. In total Stitfall played as a professional for Cardiff for eighteen seasons before retiring. During his career at Cardiff he also played alongside his two brothers at the club. Albert Stitfall made a handful of appearances alongside Ron in the first team and Bob Stitfall played as a goalkeeper for the club and, although he never made a professional appearance for the club, he did play alongside his brothers for the reserve side.

During his career Stitfall gained two caps for Wales, debuting in a 5–2 defeat against England on 12 November 1952 and winning his second cap five years later against Czechoslovakia in May 1957.

After retiring he became a youth coach at Cardiff, including coaching John Toshack who was in the youth system at the time, before joining the training staff at Newport County. He later went on to become kit manager for the Welsh national side.

== Honors ==
Cardiff City

- Welsh Cup Winner: 2

1955-56, 1958-59

- Welsh Cup Runner-up: 1

1959-60
