= George Jones (footballer, born 1918) =

English footballer

Personal information
- Full name: George Henry Jones
- Date of birth: 27 November 1918
- Place of birth: Sheffield, England
- Date of death: 1995 (aged 76–77)
- Position: Winger

Youth career
- Woodburn Alliance

Senior career*
Years	Team	Apps	(Gls)
1936–1950	Sheffield United	141	(36)
1950–1951	Barnsley	22	(6)
Total		163	(42)
- * Club domestic league appearances and goals

George Henry Jones (27 November 1918 – 1995) was an English footballer who played for Sheffield United between 1935 and 1950 in the position of winger.
