= Dai Thomas (footballer, born 1926) =

Welsh footballer

Personal information
- Date of birth: 1 August 1926
- Place of birth: Wales
- Date of death: 14 November 2014 (aged 88)
- Position: Full back

Senior career*
Years	Team	Apps	(Gls)
1949–1960	Swansea Town		
- Hereford United

International career
1957	Wales	2	(0)
- * Club domestic league appearances and goals

Dai Thomas (1 August 1926 – 14 November 2014) was a Welsh international football full back. He was part of the Wales national football team, playing 2 matches. He played his first match on 26 May 1957 against Czechoslovakia and his last match on 25 September 1957 against East Germany . At club level, he played for Swansea Town between 1949 and 1960. He played 296 matches scoring 15 goals. He also played for Hereford United.

== See also ==
- List of Wales international footballers (alphabetical)
