= Bobby McLaren =

Scottish footballer

Personal information
- Full name: Robert McLaren
- Date of birth: 5 August 1929
- Place of birth: Glasgow, Scotland
- Date of death: 8 October 2010 (aged 81)
- Place of death: Blackpool, England
- Position: Inside forward

Senior career*
Years	Team	Apps	(Gls)
1948–1950	Barry Town	23	(0)
1950–1951	Cardiff City	1	(0)
1951	Barry Town	17	(3)
1951–1952	Scunthorpe United	6	(0)
1955–1957	Bath City	112	(6)
- * Club domestic league appearances and goals

Robert McLaren (5 August 1929 – 8 October 2010) was a Scottish professional footballer who played as an inside forward. He made seven appearances in the Football League during spells with Cardiff City and Scunthorpe United.

== Career ==
Born in Glasgow, McLaren was playing for Welsh side Barry Town when his performances prompted Football League side Cardiff City to sign him in 1950. He made his professional debut in a 0–0 draw with Luton Town in March 1950 but spent the majority of his time in the club's reserve side. He was sold back to Barry Town in January 1951 for £750 before returning to the Football League with Scunthorpe United six months later. He made six appearances before dropping back into non-league football.
