= Alex Anderson (footballer) =

Scottish footballer (1921–1999)

Personal information
- Full name: Alexander Ferguson Anderson
- Date of birth: 15 November 1921
- Place of birth: Monifieth, Scotland
- Date of death: 18 January 1999 (aged 77)
- Place of death: Monifieth, Scotland
- Position: Full-back

Senior career*
Years	Team	Apps	(Gls)
1946–1947	St Johnstone	4	(0)
1947–1949	Forfar Athletic		
1949–1952	Southampton	20	(0)
1952–1953	Exeter City	6	(0)
1954–1955	Dundee United	4	(0)
- * Club domestic league appearances and goals

Alexander Ferguson Anderson (15 November 1921 – 18 January 1999) was a Scottish footballer, who played as a full-back. Anderson began his career in the mid-1940s with St Johnstone, spending a year with the Perth side before moving to Forfar Athletic.

In 1949, Anderson moved south to Southampton, spending three years as backup to England right-back Bill Ellerington before short spells with Exeter City and Dundee United. Released after playing just a few games with United, It is unknown where Anderson's career headed after his short time at Tannadice, though he did appear at then Southern League club Cheltenham Town in the 1950s.

== Death ==
Anderson died in January 1999, aged 77.
