= Billy Cairns =

English footballer (1914–1988)

Personal information
- Full name: William Hart Cairns
- Date of birth: 7 October 1914
- Place of birth: Newcastle upon Tyne, England
- Date of death: 25 May 1988 (aged 73)
- Height: 5 ft 9 in (1.75 m)
- Position: Centre forward

Senior career*
Years	Team	Apps	(Gls)
–1934	Stargate Rovers		
1934–1939	Newcastle United	87	(51)
1944–1946	Gateshead	0	(0)
1946–1954	Grimsby Town	221	(121)
- * Club domestic league appearances and goals

William Hart Cairns (7 October 1914 – 25 May 1988) was an English footballer who played as a centre forward.

Cairns started his career with non-league Stargate Rovers before signing for Newcastle United in 1934. He scored a total of 53 goals in 90 league and cup appearances for Newcastle before the outbreak of World War II. Cairns signed for Gateshead in 1944, appearing in the 1945–46 FA Cup. He scored 5 goals in 4 games during the competition before signing for Grimsby Town prior to The Football League resuming in 1946–47. He played over 220 games for Grimsby before retiring in 1954.

== Sources ==
- "Post War English & Scottish Football League A - Z Player's Transfer Database".
