= Bryn Elliott =

English footballer (1925–2019)

Personal information
- Full name: Bernard Harry Elliott
- Date of birth: 3 May 1925
- Place of birth: Beeston, England
- Date of death: 15 February 2019 (aged 93)
- Place of death: Southampton, England
- Height: 5 ft 7 in (1.70 m)
- Position: Half-back

Youth career
- Beeston Lads Club

Senior career*
Years	Team	Apps	(Gls)
1942–1949	Nottingham Forest	10	(0)
1949	Boston United		
1949–1959	Southampton	235	(2)
1959–1960	Poole Town		
- * Club domestic league appearances and goals

Bernard Harry "Bryn" Elliott (3 May 1925 – 15 February 2019) was an English footballer who played as a half-back in the 1940s and 1950s. He started his career at Nottingham Forest, before joining Southampton in 1949, where he was to remain for the next ten years.

== Football career ==
Elliott was born in Beeston, near Nottingham and was educated at Beeston Fields School. He was a member of the Beeston Lads Club during World War II who played and defeated local Football League clubs, Notts County and Nottingham Forest.

Elliott was signed by Forest in October 1942 and remained with them until August 1949, making ten appearances in the Football League Second Division. He then dropped down to non-League football, joining Boston United of the Midland League from where, in October 1949, he was signed by Southampton's recently-appointed manager, Sid Cann, together with his team-mate Tom Lowder.

He made his debut for the reserve team on 5 October 1949 before making his first-team debut on 25 February 1950 in front of a crowd of over 70,000 at White Hart Lane. Elliott played at left-half in a 4–0 defeat by Tottenham Hotspur; despite the result, he retained his place in the team for the next match, before returning to the reserves. At the end of the season, the "Saints" finished fourth in the Second Division, missing promotion on goal average, with Tottenham Hotspur being promoted as champions.

Described as "the owner of a neat, precise style" with "enthusiasm, combined with forceful and tenacious tackling", he soon became an established member of the Southampton side, making 23 league appearances in 1950–51 and 27 in the following season, in both of which Southampton finished mid-table. In 1952–53, Elliott only missed one match in a defence that conceded 85 goals, with the team being relegated to the Third Division South for the first time in over 30 years.

He was in-and-out of the side over the next few years, making 31 appearances in 1953–54, 19 in 1954–55, 36 in 1955–56 and 34 in 1956–57. In 1957–58, he had two long runs in the side until he was dropped after a 5–2 defeat at Bournemouth & Boscombe Athletic in February 1958.

Elliott spent the 1958–59 season in the reserves, before he was released in the 1959 close season. In his ten years at The Dell, Elliott made a total of 251 first-team appearances, scoring twice.

== Later career ==
Following his release, he played part-time for Poole Town of the Southern League (managed by former Southampton player Mike Keeping), along with Southampton teammates Pat Parker, Sam Stevens and Barry Hillier.

He ran an off-licence business in Waterloo Road in Freemantle until the 1990s and continued to play golf at Stoneham into his 90s.
