= Ron Wheatley =

English footballer

Personal information
- Full name: Roland Wheatley
- Date of birth: 20 June 1924
- Place of birth: Radford, Nottinghamshire, England
- Date of death: 27 July 2003 (aged 79)
- Place of death: Nottingham, England
- Height: 5 ft 9 in (1.75 m)
- Position: Wing half

Senior career*
Years	Team	Apps	(Gls)
1940–1946	Beeston Boys Club		
1946–1949	Nottingham Forest	6	(0)
1949–1951	Southampton	10	(1)
1951–1952	Grimsby Town	5	(0)
1952	Halifax Town	0	(0)
1952	Workington	0	(0)
1952–1953	Corby Town		
1953–1954	Stamford		
- * Club domestic league appearances and goals

Roland Wheatley (20 June 1924 – 27 July 2003) was an English professional footballer who played as a wing half.
