= Walter Judd (footballer) =

English footballer (1926-1964)

Personal information
- Full name: Walter James Judd
- Date of birth: 25 October 1926
- Place of birth: Salisbury, Wiltshire, England
- Date of death: 17 December 1964 (aged 38)
- Place of death: Nomansland, Wiltshire, England
- Position: Centre-forward

Youth career
- Downton

Senior career*
Years	Team	Apps	(Gls)
1947–1949	Nomansland		
1949–1953	Southampton	34	(13)
1957	Nomansland		

International career
1952	England B	1	(0)
- * Club domestic league appearances and goals

Walter James Judd (25 October 1926 – 18 December 1964) was an English footballer who played as a centre-forward in the 1940s and 1950s for Southampton.

== Playing career ==
Judd was born in Salisbury, Wiltshire and as a youth played football for local sides Downton and Nomansland. Before becoming a professional footballer, he had been conscripted as a "Bevin Boy", working at Blackwood Colliery in South Wales.

He was signed by Southampton in August 1949 and spent his first two years at The Dell in the reserves, for whom he scored 27 goals in 34 matches. This form earned him a call to the first team, for whom he made his debut away to Leicester City, when he took the place of Eric Day for a Second Division match on 21 April 1951.

Judd spent the start of the 1951–52 season in the reserves but was recalled to the first team on 22 December 1951, taking the place of Eddy Brown for the match against Barnsley. He scored the Saints' goal in a 1–1 draw and retained his place for the remainder of the season, scoring nine goals in 19 appearances. His form earned him a call-up to the England B team for a match against the British Olympic XI.

Although Judd started the following season as first choice centre-forward, playing the opening 13 games, scoring four goals, he lost his place to Frank Dudley and dropped back to the reserves. On 26 December 1952, in a reserve match against Plymouth Argyle, Judd snapped ligaments in his leg and his professional career was over.

== Later career ==
Following his retirement, he lived at Nomansland in the New Forest and worked for the Forestry Commission. In 1957, he came out of retirement to play for his local village side.

Judd died at Nomansland on 18 December 1964, aged 38.

== Bibliography ==
- Chalk, Gary; Holley, Duncan; Bull, David (2013). All the Saints – A Complete Players' Who's Who of Southampton FC. Hagiology Publishing. ISBN 978-0-9926864-0-6.
- Holley, Duncan; Chalk, Gary (1992). The Alphabet of the Saints. ACL & Polar Publishing. ISBN 0-9514862-3-3.
- Holley, Duncan; Chalk, Gary (2003). In That Number – A Post-war Chronicle of Southampton FC. Hagiology Publishing. ISBN 0-9534474-3-X.
- Hugman, Barry (1981). Football League Players Records (1946–1981). Aylesbury: Rothmans Publications. ISBN 0-907574-08-4.
