= Jack Edwards (footballer, born 1924) =

English footballer (1924-1978)

Personal information
- Full name: John Joseph Edwards
- Date of birth: 23 February 1924
- Place of birth: Salford, England
- Date of death: 17 October 1978 (aged 54)
- Place of death: Nottingham, England
- Height: 5 ft 10 in (1.78 m)
- Position: Inside forward

Youth career
- Adelphi Lads Club
- Long Eaton United

Senior career*
| Years | Team | Apps | (Gls) |
| 1944–1949 | Nottingham Forest | 77 | (20) |
| 1949–1952 | Southampton | 82 | (16) |
| 1952 | → Kidderminster Harriers (loan) | | |
| 1952–1954 | Notts County | 25 | (3) |
- King's Lynn
- * Club domestic league appearances and goals

John Joseph Edwards (23 February 1924 – 17 October 1978) was an English footballer who played as an inside-forward for Nottingham Forest, Southampton and Notts County during the 1940s and 1950s.

== Football career ==
Edwards was born in Salford and played his early football for the Adelphi Lads Club. Because of the confusion during the Second World War, Edwards failed to be picked up by either of the Manchester clubs before moving to Nottinghamshire where he played for Long Eaton United.

This brought him to the attention of Nottingham Forest whom he joined in May 1944, going on to make his Second Division debut in 1946. He soon became noticed by larger clubs and attracted bids of £14,000 from Arsenal and Liverpool in 1947. These were rejected by Forest, but two years later they accepted an offer of £10,000 from fellow Second Division club, Southampton. During his three league seasons with Forest, Edwards scored 20 goals from 77 league appearances.

He joined the "Saints" in June 1949 and made his debut on 20 August when he scored the consolation goal in a 2–1 defeat by Grimsby Town. Edwards was a regular during the 1949–50 season, when the club missed out on promotion for the third successive season, finishing level on points but with an inferior goal average to second place Sheffield Wednesday. Described in the club handbook as "a real box of tricks", Edwards was a clever ball-player and popular with the crowd. In the following season, Edwards only missed six matches with the Saints finishing in a disappointing 12th place, having been top of the table at Christmas.

Edwards was again a regular in the 1951–52 season, before losing his place to Tom Lowder at the beginning of December. Although he made one further appearance in the FA Cup, his Saints career was over and he spent the start of the 1952–53 season on loan to Southern League Kidderminster Harriers.

In November 1952, he was transferred to Notts County as part of the deal that brought Alex Simpson to The Dell. During his Southampton career, he played a total of 85 games, scoring 16 goals.

Edwards remained at Meadow Lane until the summer of 1954, although his career never prospered there, scoring just three goals from 25 appearances.

== Later career ==
Edwards dropped back into non-League football in 1954, shortly after his 30th birthday when he joined King's Lynn of the Midland League.

He was killed in a street mugging in October 1978.
