= Harold Williams (footballer) =

Welsh footballer

Personal information
- Full name: Harold Williams
- Date of birth: 17 June 1924
- Place of birth: Briton Ferry, Wales
- Date of death: 12 September 2014 (aged 90)
- Place of death: Leeds, England

International career
Years	Team	Apps	(Gls)
	Wales	4	

Harold Williams (17 June 1924 – 12 September 2014) was a Welsh international footballer who attained 4 caps for Wales. A nippy winger, he impressed the Leeds manager when he performed as part of the Newport County side that knocked Leeds out of the 1949 FA Cup. At the end of the season he became a Leeds player for what was quite a high fee at the time (£12,000). Able to switch wings at will, he was a creative and talented player who created many goals for John Charles as well as scoring a few himself. A broken leg in November 1952 kept him out of the side for 9 months, but he had lost nothing on his return. He left Leeds for a brief spell back at Newport making his total appearances 85 for Newport in the two spells, scoring 17 goals. He returned to Bradford Park Avenue where he lasted less than a season before retiring.

He became the landlord of the railway Inn Beeston leeds until its demolishment he then became the landlord of The Griffin Hotel situated in the small quiet village of Gildersome near Morley after he retired from football, he ran the pub with his wife-and the pair earned much respect with their strictness.

At the time of his death in 2014, he was the oldest surviving Welsh international footballer.
