= Stan Clements =

English footballer (1923–2018)

Personal information
- Full name: Stanley Finlay Thomas Clements
- Date of birth: 25 June 1923
- Place of birth: Portsmouth, England
- Date of death: 8 November 2018 (aged 95)
- Height: 6 ft 2 in (1.88 m)
- Position: Centre back

Senior career*
Years	Team	Apps	(Gls)
1944–1955	Southampton	116	(1)
- * Club domestic league appearances and goals

Stanley Finlay Thomas Clements OBE (25 June 1923 – 8 November 2018) was an English footballer who played most of his professional career for Southampton.

== Playing career ==
He was a mechanical engineer in Portsmouth's naval dockyards and joined Southampton from Gosport Borough in July 1944.

He made his league debut on 24 May 1947 in the 2–0 home victory over Fulham. He was a strong, powerful centre-half and replaced Eric Webber for 13 games in the following season when Webber was rested. Once Webber regained his place in the team, Clements made no further first-team appearances until February 1951. For the following few seasons he alternated at centre-back with Len Wilkins and Henry Horton and had a spell as team captain in 1952–53.

He scored once in 116 league games before becoming player-coach at Basingstoke Town in February 1955.

== Later career ==
After leaving football, he qualified as a civil engineer and worked in Kenya, Uganda and Sudan, before briefly helping to coach the Kenyan national team. In 1981, he was appointed O.B.E. for services to engineering in Africa.

He returned to the UK in the mid-1980s and latterly lived in Gosport. He died in November 2018 at the age of 95.
