= Ernie Jones (footballer, born 1920) =

Welsh footballer

Personal information
- Full name: William Ernest Arthur Jones
- Date of birth: 12 November 1920
- Place of birth: Cwmbwrla, Wales
- Date of death: 21 November 2002 (aged 82)
- Position: Winger

Youth career
- Cwmbwria Juniors
- Manselton School
- 1937–1938: Swansea Town

Senior career*
Years	Team	Apps	(Gls)
1938–1943	Bolton Wanderers	0	(0)
1943–1947	Swansea Town	37	(3)
1947–1949	Tottenham Hotspur	55	(14)
1949–1951	Southampton	44	(4)
1951–1953	Bristol City	50	(7)
1954	Rhyl		

International career
1946–1948	Wales	4	(0)

Managerial career
- 1954–1956: Rhyl
- * Club domestic league appearances and goals

William Ernest Arthur Jones (12 November 1920 – 21 November 2002) was a professional footballer who played for Swansea Town, Tottenham Hotspur, Southampton, Bristol City, Rhyl and represented Wales at national level.

== Football career ==
Jones was born in Cwmbwrla, Swansea and grew up on Alice Street in Swansea, being a neighbour of fellow future Welsh internationals Jackie Roberts, Mel Nurse, John Charles and Mel Charles.

He began his football career as an amateur at Bolton Wanderers before joining Swansea Town in October 1943. He made 37 appearances and scored three times for the club in the 1946–47 season. The free scoring winger transferred to Tottenham Hotspur in October 1947 for a £7000 fee. He went on to appear in 57 matches and found the net on 16 occasions in all competitions between 1947 and 1948.

He left Spurs in May 1949 to join Southampton in a transfer deal which involved Alf Ramsey, where he featured in 44 games and scoring on four occasions. In November 1951 he transferred to Bristol City as a player/coach and played a further 50 matches and netting seven times between 1951 and 1954. Jones ended his senior career at Rhyl in the position of player/manager.

== International career ==
Jones played on four occasions for the Welsh national side.

== After football ==
After his football career ended, Jones settled in Bolton where he was employed by Hawker Siddeley. He died on 21 November 2002, nine days after his 82nd birthday.
