= Jimmy McGowan (footballer, born 1924) =

Scottish footballer (1924–1984)

Personal information
- Full name: James McGowan
- Date of birth: 12 January 1924
- Place of birth: Cambuslang, Scotland
- Date of death: 28 March 1984 (aged 60)
- Place of death: Southampton, England
- Height: 5 ft 7 in (1.70 m)
- Position: Inside forward

Youth career
- St Bride's BG
- Fallin YC
- Armadale Thistle

Senior career*
Years	Team	Apps	(Gls)
1942–1944	Celtic	0	(0)
1944	→ East Fife (on loan)	0	(0)
1944–1945	Clyde	0	(0)
1945–1946	Dumbarton	0	(0)
1946–1950	Grimsby Town	34	(4)
1950–1958	Southampton	79	(9)
1958–????	Salisbury		(6)
- * Club domestic league appearances and goals

James McGowan (12 January 1924 – 28 March 1984) was a Scottish footballer who played as an inside forward in the 1940s and 1950s. After starting his professional career in his home city with Celtic, he moved to England in 1946 where he played for Grimsby Town and Southampton. He died shortly after his 60th birthday from drowning.

== Playing career ==
McGowan was born at Cambuslang, on the south-eastern outskirts of Glasgow. As a youth he played for Fallin Youth Club, gaining Scottish schoolboy honours. Whilst training as a coachbuilder, he played part-time for Junior club Armadale Thistle, before joining Celtic in 1944. At Celtic, he played in the wartime leagues, including in the 8–1 defeat by Rangers on New Year's Day 1943. He made a total of 23 appearances for Celtic, scoring five goals. In 1944 he was loaned out to East Fife, before joining Dumbarton for a year in 1945.

He moved to England in the summer of 1946 to join Grimsby Town, then in the First Division, for whom he made 34 league appearances playing generally as a half-back, scoring four goals.

He joined Southampton in March 1950 for a fee of £8,000 and made his debut for The Saints at home to Cardiff City when he scored in a 3–1 victory. Described as "a forager and provider", he only played in more than half the first team games in the Second Division in 1951–52 (playing at inside-right) and in the Third Division South in 1955–56 (as a right-half). He missed the entire 1953–54 season because of a severe lung infection. Following this, he captained the reserve team, leading them to victory in the Combination Cup in 1955.

He remained at The Dell until August 1958, after which he made a few appearances for Salisbury in non-league football.

In his eight years with Southampton, he made 82 appearances, scoring nine goals.

== Later career ==
Following his retirement from football, McGowan became a pub landlord including as the licensee of the Drummond Arms in Portswood. The pub became popular with many of Southampton's Scottish players, including Jim Steele who lived there for a time. For their 1976 FA Cup Final programme, the BBC filmed a piece at the pub. After their victory over Manchester United, Steele, together with Peter Osgood and goalscorer Bobby Stokes, brought the cup to the Drummond Arms, before taking it on a "tour" of hostelries in the town centre.

On 28 March 1984, a few weeks after his 60th birthday, McGowan drowned in the boating lake on Southampton Common.

== Bibliography ==
- Chalk, Gary; Holley, Duncan; Bull, David (2013). All the Saints – A Complete Players' Who's Who of Southampton FC. Hagiology Publishing. ISBN 978-0-9926864-0-6.
- Holley, Duncan; Chalk, Gary (1992). The Alphabet of the Saints. ACL & Polar Publishing. ISBN 0-9514862-3-3.
- Holley, Duncan; Chalk, Gary (2003). In That Number – A Post-war Chronicle of Southampton FC. Hagiology Publishing. ISBN 0-9534474-3-X.
- Hugman, Barry (1981). Football League Players Records (1946–1981). Aylesbury: Rothmans Publications. ISBN 0-907574-08-4.
