= Bill Robinson (English footballer) =

English footballer and manager

Personal information
- Date of birth: 4 April 1919
- Place of birth: Whitburn, County Durham, England
- Date of death: 7 October 1992 (aged 73)
- Height: 5 ft 10 in (1.78 m)
- Position: Forward

Youth career
- Hylton Colliery Juniors

Senior career*
Years	Team	Apps	(Gls)
1935–1939	Sunderland	24	(14)
1946–1949	Charlton Athletic	52	(16)
1949–1952	West Ham United	101	(60)
Total		177	(90)

Managerial career
- 1959–1962: Hartlepools United
- * Club domestic league appearances and goals

Bill Robinson (4 April 1919 – 7 October 1992) was an English professional footballer who played in the Football League as a centre forward for Sunderland, Charlton Athletic and West Ham United. He later became assistant manager at West Ham United and went on to manage Hartlepools United.

== Career ==
Robinson was born in Whitburn and played for Hylton Colliery before joining Sunderland as an apprentice at the age of 15. His Sunderland debut came against Wolverhampton Wanderers on 30 August 1937 and he made 10 League appearances, scoring 3 goals in 1937–38. He then played 14 League games in 1938–39, scoring 11 goals. On 4 March 1939, just short of his 20th birthday, he scored four goals in a 5–2 win against Manchester United. This included a four-minute hat-trick starting in the 60th minute, before netting his fourth near the end.

He made a total of 27 First Division appearances for Sunderland. However, his three in the 1939–40 season were voided due to the abandonment of the League after war broke out.

During World War II, Robinson was conscripted for national service and served with the Durham Light Infantry, once scoring four goals while playing for them against his old team Sunderland. He made an appearance for the Combined Services C.M.F. in a game against a Combined Services B.A.O.R. team at the Arena Milan on 13 December 1945, and guested for Stoke City, Luton Town and Hamilton Academical. He also played for Charlton Athletic, winning the War Cup South final at Wembley Stadium with the club in 1944.

He officially joined Charlton Athletic, also of the First Division, in May 1946. He was part of the team that won the 1946–47 FA Cup, scoring the winner in the fourth-round, and returned to Wembley for the Final, setting up the only goal of the game for Chris Duffy. The 1947 Cup Final was played on 26 April, the day his son Robert was born. He scored 18 goals in 60 League and cup appearances for the Addicks.

Second Division team West Ham United then signed him for a fee of £7,000, also buying his house in Welling as part of the deal. A week after signing for the club, Robinson scored on his debut, a 1–2 away win against West Bromwich Albion on 15 January 1949. He followed this up with a goal in his next game, and managed 10 goals in his first 11 games, including his first of two hat-tricks for the club, against Leicester City on 15 April 1949. He ended his debut season as the club's second-highest scorer behind Ken Wright.

The following season, 1949–50, he scored nine goals in the first nine games. He scored in his first FA Cup game for the club, in the 5–1 defeat of Ipswich Town on 7 January 1950.

The following season saw Robinson's second hat-trick, in a 5–3 home defeat to Sheffield United, as well as five braces. He twice managed to score in five consecutive League games (between 9 September and 7 October, and between 30 December and 17 February). He held the post-war scoring record at West Ham, with his haul of 26 goals in 40 League games in 1950–51. The record would not be surpassed until 1958–59, when John Dick scored 27. At this point, he was fourth in West Ham's all-time goalscorers list, behind Vic Watson, Jimmy Ruffell and Syd Puddefoot.

The 1951-52 season saw Robinson play in the first four games of the season. He played his final game for the Irons on 29 August 1951 and, bar some reserve team games, did not feature again due to a persistent knee injury. In all, Robinson made 105 appearances and scored 61 goals for the Upton Park club.

Robinson stayed at West Ham United following his injury. He was initially given the task of providing opposition reports to Ted Fenton and the management team. He then joined the coaching staff, looking after the youth team and helping to produce players such as Bobby Moore and Geoff Hurst. He guided the U18s to the FA Youth Cup semi-final in 1954, and the final in 1957. He was promoted to assistant to Ted Fenton in 1957 and was responsible for coaching the first team. Under their guidance West Ham were promoted to Division One at the end of the 1957–58 season.

After this success, he left to return to his native north east to become manager of Hartlepools United in November 1959.

The 1961–62 season proved to be his last in football. Robinson was sacked after Hartlepools finished 22nd in the Fourth Division and narrowly avoided relegation. He left the role on 30 June 1962 and was succeeded by Allenby Chilton, an old Hylton friend and former Charlton teammate during the war.

== Career statistics ==
=== Playing statistics ===
Club	Season	League			FA Cup		Other		Total	
Club	Season	Division	Apps	Goals	Apps	Goals	Apps	Goals	Apps	Goals
Sunderland	1937–38	First Division	10	3	0	0	2 (Note: Durham Senior Cup Semi-Final, 22 September 1937; Empire Exhibition Trophy Quarter-Final, 25 May 1938)	0	10	3
Sunderland	1938–39	First Division	14	11	0	0	0	3	14	11
Sunderland	Total		24	14	0	0	2	0	26	14
Charlton Athletic	1946–47	First Division	34	13	6	1	0	0	40	14
Charlton Athletic	1947–48	First Division	16	3	2	1	0	0	18	4
Charlton Athletic	1948–49	First Division	2	0	0	0	0	0	2	0
Charlton Athletic	Total		52	16	8	2	0	0	60	18
West Ham United	1948–49	Second Division	17	10	0	0	0	0	17	10
West Ham United	1949–50	Second Division	40	23	2	1	0	0	42	24
West Ham United	1950–51	Second Division	40	26	2	0	4 (Note: Essex Professional Cup (all matches))	3	46	29
West Ham United	1951–52	Second Division	4	1	0	0	0	0	4	1
West Ham United	Total		101	60	4	1	4	3	109	64
Career total			177	90	12	3	6	3	195	96

=== Managerial statistics ===
Club	From	To	P	W	D	L	Win% (Note: Win% is rounded to two decimal places)
Hartlepools United	Nov 1959	Jun 1962	125	27	24	74	21.60

== Honours ==
Charlton Athletic

- FA Cup: 1946–47
