= Ernie Stevenson =

English footballer

Personal information
- Full name: Ernest Stevenson
- Date of birth: 28 December 1923
- Place of birth: Rotherham, England
- Date of death: 15 October 1970 (aged 46)
- Height: 5 ft 6 in (1.68 m)
- Position: Inside forward

Senior career*
| Years | Team | Apps | (Gls) |
| 1946–1948 | Wolverhampton Wanderers | 8 | (0) |
| 1948–1950 | Cardiff City | 50 | (15) |
| 1950–1951 | Southampton | 24 | (8) |
| 1951–1952 | Leeds United | 16 | (5) |
| 1952–1954 | Wisbech Town | ? | (?) |
| 1954 | Bath City | ? | (?) |
| 1954–-1955 | Rhyl | ? | (?) |
| 1955–-1957 | South Liverpool | ? | (?) |
| 1957 | Cresswell Colliery | ? | (?) |
- * Club domestic league appearances and goals

Ernest Stevenson (28 December 1923 — 15 October 1970) was an English professional footballer.

== Football career ==
After playing for one of the club's nursery sides, Stevenson began his career at Wolverhampton Wanderers but did not play league football for them for several years due to World War II. He made his wartime debut for the club under Frank Buckley at the age of 17 but, when league football resumed, Stevenson struggled to make an impact on the first team playing just 8 times before being allowed to join Cardiff City in October 1948. Put straight into the first team, he finished his first season as the club's top scorer with 14 goals in all competitions and continued his scoring during the early stages of the following season but as the year progressed his goals dried up and he moved to Southampton, with Wilf Grant moving the other way.

He never managed to fully regain his form and after one year at Southampton, he joined Leeds United in 1951 in exchange for Frank Dudley moving the other way, reuniting Stevenson with his former Wolves manager Frank Buckley, before dropping out of league football.

He played afterwards for Wisbech Town In April 1954 he played for Bath City. In September 1954 he was with Rhyl. In September 1955 Stevenson signed for South Liverpool and played for the club in the Lancashire Combination. In March 1957 he signed for Central Alliance club Cresswell Colliery.
