= Eric Day =

English footballer

Personal information
- Full name: Eric Charles Day
- Date of birth: 6 November 1921
- Place of birth: Dartford, England
- Date of death: 10 November 2012 (aged 91)
- Position: Winger

Senior career*
Years	Team	Apps	(Gls)
1945–1957	Southampton	398	(147)
–	Gravesend & Northfleet		
- * Club domestic league appearances and goals

Eric Charles Day (6 November 1921 – 10 November 2012) was an English footballer who played his entire career of nearly 400 Football League games for Southampton. He was born in Dartford, Kent. During his career with the club, which lasted 11 years from 1945 to 1957, he scored 145 league goals, which placed him seventh on the club's list of all-time goalscorers. He was selected to play for the Third Division South representative side in 1954–55.
