= Len Wilkins =

English footballer

Leonard Wilkins (20 September 1925 – August 2003) was an English professional footballer who played his entire career (at half-back) for Southampton from 1945 to 1958.

In 1958, he emigrated to Canada and played in the National Soccer League with the Polish White Eagles.
