= Sid Cann =

English footballer (1911–1996)

Personal information
- Full name: Sydney Thomas Cann
- Date of birth: 30 October 1911
- Place of birth: Babbacombe, Torquay, England
- Date of death: 1 November 1996 (aged 85)
- Place of death: New Malden, England
- Height: 5 ft 8 in (1.73 m)
- Position: Full-back

Senior career*
Years	Team	Apps	(Gls)
1928–1930	Torquay United	44	(3)
1930–1935	Manchester City	42	(0)
1935–1939	Charlton Athletic	15	(0)

Managerial career
- 1949–1951: Southampton
- 1952–1961: Wycombe Wanderers
- 1962–1973: Sutton United
- * Club domestic league appearances and goals

Sydney Thomas Cann (30 October 1911 – 1 November 1996) was an English professional football player and manager. A full-back, he was capped twice by England at Schools level.

== Playing career ==
Born in Babbacombe, Torquay, Sid Cann joined Torquay United from Babbacombe school in November 1928, making his league debut away to Crystal Palace. After battling for a first team place with Willie Brown, he began the following season as a first choice, missing only a handful of games before moving to Manchester City in March 1930.

He played 42 league games for the Maine Road side, appearing on the losing side in the 1933 FA Cup final, but was never a first team regular and moved to Charlton Athletic in June 1935 and qualified as an FA Coach, making only 15 appearances as Charlton rose through the divisions prior to the onset of World War Two. He guested for Torquay United, Aldershot and Bristol City during the war, serving in the Army Physical Training Corps. Later during the war he qualified as a masseur (at the Bristol College of Physiotherapy) and joined Southampton as a physio.

== Managerial career ==
=== Southampton ===
In June 1946 he was appointed assistant manager of Southampton and in August 1949, after Bill Dodgin left for Fulham, he was appointed manager, almost taking them to promotion from Division Two in his first season in charge. He left the Dell in December 1951 after a fall-out with the board and took up a coaching role with the Football Association.

=== Wycombe Wanderers ===
In August 1952, he was appointed manager of Isthmian League side Wycombe Wanderers and took them to third place at the end of this first season, their highest finishing position for 23 years. In his nine years in charge, he kept Wycombe constantly challenging for the league title, which they won in 1955–56 and 1956–57. They were also runners-up in 1957–58 and 1959–60, and reached the FA Amateur Cup final in 1957.

He left Wycombe in July 1961 to take up a coaching position at Norwich City, which he held until March the following year.

=== Sutton United ===
In July 1962, Cann was appointed manager of Athenian League side Sutton United and made an immediate impact, leading Sutton to the final of the FA Amateur Cup at Wembley, where Sutton had never played before. The first two seasons of Cann's reign in Sutton saw good finishes in the Athenian League, which led to an invitation for the club to join the Isthmian League.

Sutton confounded expectations in their first season by finishing in 4th place and remained in the top ten for the next two seasons, before winning the title in 1966–67. A second defeat at Wembley in the FA Amateur Cup Final followed in 1969, with Sutton once more finishing in the top three in the table. The following season again saw Sutton challenging for the title, but they gained national prominence with a run in the FA Cup which ended with a 6–0 defeat at home to the reigning league champions Leeds United. He eventually left Sutton in the summer of 1973.

== Honours ==
Manchester City

- FA Cup runner-up: 1932–33
