= 1947–48 Southampton F.C. season =

English football club season

Southampton F.C.
1947–48 season
- Chairman: Alf Jukes
- Manager: Bill Dodgin
- Stadium: The Dell
- Second Division: 3rd
- FA Cup: Sixth round
- Top goalscorer: League: Charlie Wayman (17); All: Charlie Wayman (19)
- Highest home attendance: 27,330 v West Bromwich Albion (27 March 1948)
- Lowest home attendance: 15,280 v Fulham (21 April 1948)
- Average home league attendance: 20,717
- Biggest win: 6–1 v Doncaster Rovers (20 December 1947)
- Biggest defeat: 0–5 v Newcastle United (25 October 1947)
Home colours

The 1947–48 season was the 47th year of competitive football played by Southampton F.C., the club's 21st season as members of the Football League, and their 19th competing in the Second Division. The Saints finished the campaign in third place in the league table, having gained 52 from a possible 84 points with 21 wins, ten draws and 11 losses. The club also competed in the FA Cup, making it to the sixth round before being eliminated by fellow Second Division side Tottenham Hotspur.

After an underwhelming first post-war league performance the previous season, Southampton manager Bill Dodgin made a number of new signings before the start of the 1947–48 campaign. One of the biggest deals in the summer of 1947 was the sale of winger Don Roper to Arsenal, for whom the First Division side paid £12,000 as well as transferring two of their own forwards – George Curtis and Tommy Rudkin. Also signed in the summer were Luton Town forward Augie Scott, Leyton Orient full-back Ted Ballard, and young Scottish forward George Beattie. Dodgin continued signing new players during the first half of the season, adding winger Billy Wrigglesworth and centre-forward Charlie Wayman in October, followed by Scottish goalkeeper Ian Black in December. All three played central roles in the second half of the season.

During the season, 23 players appeared for Southampton in all competitions. Full-back Alf Ramsey featured in more games than any other player, being ever present in both the league and FA Cup with 46 appearances. Charlie Wayman, who joined the club a few months after the season started, finished as Southampton's top scorer with 19 goals in all competitions – 17 in the league and two in the FA Cup. The club attracted an average home league attendance at The Dell of 20,717 – the highest league attendance was 27,330 against West Bromwich Albion, although this was surpassed in the FA Cup fifth round against Swindon Town which was attended by 29,134.

== Second Division ==
=== Season summary ===
Southampton's start to the 1947–48 league campaign brought mixed fortunes. The side won just four of its first ten games, failing to pick up victories over recently promoted sides Doncaster Rovers (with whom they drew 1–1 in the opening fixture) and Cardiff City (by whom they were thrashed 1–5), which left them in the bottom half of the table. The team's performances picked up starting in November after they had signed prolific Newcastle United centre-forward Charlie Wayman, who helped them secure wins against title challengers Birmingham City, as well as mid-table sides Barnsley and Luton Town. In December, the club won three games in a row (including a season-record 6–1 return win over Doncaster) to reach the top five of the league table by Boxing Day. In his first ten games at the Saints, Wayman scored eight times.

With new signing Ian Black taking over in goal, Southampton started the new year on strong form, embarking on an unbeaten run of nine league games between 31 January and 29 March 1948; the run included a 5–1 home win over relegation-threatened Millwall, a 1–0 away win against Coventry City, and a 4–2 victory over eventual Second Division runners-up Newcastle United in which Wayman scored twice in three minutes against his former club. By the end of March, Southampton were in the running for promotion to the First Division, however after two wins in early April against Barnsley and Plymouth Argyle, it was predicted by local newspaper the Southern Daily Echo that the team could "forget about promotion". Four wins from their last five games saw Southampton climb from fifth to third, where they finished just four points behind second.

=== Final league table ===
Pos	Team	Pld	W	D	L	GF	GA	GAv	Pts	Qualification or relegation
1	Birmingham City (C, P)	42	22	15	5	55	24	2.292	59	Promotion to the First Division
2	Newcastle United (P)	42	24	8	10	72	41	1.756	56	Promotion to the First Division
3	Southampton	42	21	10	11	71	53	1.340	52	
4	Sheffield Wednesday	42	20	11	11	66	53	1.245	51	
5	Cardiff City	42	18	11	13	61	58	1.052	47	

Source: RSSSF
Rules for classification: 1) Points; 2) Goal average; 3) Goals scored
(C) Champions; (P) Promoted

=== Results by matchday ===
Round	1	2	3	4	5	6	7	8	9	10	11	12	13	14	15	16	17	18	19	20	21	22	23	24	25	26	27	28	29	30	31	32	33	34	35	36	37	38	39	40	41	42
Ground	A	H	H	A	H	A	A	H	H	A	H	A	H	A	H	A	H	A	H	A	H	H	A	H	A	A	H	H	A	A	H	A	H	H	A	A	H	A	A	H	H	A
Result	D	W	L	W	W	L	L	D	W	L	D	W	W	L	W	L	W	L	W	D	W	W	W	L	D	L	W	W	D	W	W	D	W	D	D	L	L	W	W	W	W	D
Position	12	6	12	5	4	6	15	14	7	13	12	9	8	10	9	9	8	8	8	8	7	7	5	6	6	7	6	5	5	4	4	4	4	4	4	5	5	4	4	3	3	3

Source: statto.com
A = Away; H = Home; W = Win; D = Draw; L = Loss

=== Match results ===
23 August 1947 1	Doncaster Rovers	1–1	Southampton	Doncaster
	Maddison 37'		Bradley 5'	Stadium: Belle Vue; Attendance: 30,000

27 August 1947 2	Southampton	3–1	Sheffield Wednesday	Southampton
	Ramsey 57' (pen.); Bradley 72' 89'		Hunt 6'	Stadium: The Dell; Attendance: 16,751

30 August 1947 3	Southampton	1–2	Leeds United	Southampton
	Bradley 77'		Short 40'; Wakefield 44'	Stadium: The Dell; Attendance: 20,801

1 September 1947 4	Sheffield Wednesday	1–2	Southampton	Sheffield
	Dailey 31'		Bradley 33' 75'	Stadium: Hillsborough Stadium; Attendance: 23,077

6 September 1947 5	Southampton	1–0	Bury	Southampton
	Bradley 7'			Stadium: The Dell; Attendance: 17,617

8 September 1947 6	Cardiff City	5–1	Southampton	Cardiff
	Webber 20' (o.g.); Rees; Richards 70'; Moore		Day 49'	Stadium: Ninian Park; Attendance: 40,000

13 September 1947 7	West Ham United	2–0	Southampton	London
	Wood 3'; Hall 38'			Stadium: Boleyn Ground; Attendance: 20,709

17 September 1947 8	Southampton	2–2	Cardiff City	Southampton
	Bradley 22'; Day 73'		McBennett 32', 67'	Stadium: The Dell; Attendance: 17,000

20 September 1947 9	Southampton	3–0	Chesterfield	Southampton
	Day 4', 13', 74'			Stadium: The Dell; Attendance: 18,590

27 September 1947 10	Millwall	3–0	Southampton	London
	Mansfield 57'; Jinks 83'; Woodward 88'			Stadium: The Den; Attendance: 23,000

4 October 1947 11	Southampton	1–1	Tottenham Hotspur	Southampton
	Day 4'		Duquemin 53'	Stadium: The Dell; Attendance: 23,480

11 October 1947 12	Fulham	0–2	Southampton	London
			Bates 16', 50'	Stadium: Craven Cottage; Attendance: 24,437

18 October 1947 13	Southampton	3–1	Coventry City	Southampton
	Bates 26'; Ramsey 37' (pen.); Wrigglesworth 71'		Roberts 53' (pen.)	Stadium: The Dell; Attendance: 21,767

25 October 1947 14	Newcastle United	5–0	Southampton	Newcastle upon Tyne
	Milburn 30'; Stobbart 32'; Walker 53', 83'; Pearson 75'			Stadium: St James' Park; Attendance: 50,000

1 November 1947 15	Southampton	2–0	Birmingham City	Southampton
	Curts 5'; Ramsey 80' (pen.)			Stadium: The Dell; Attendance: 27,000

8 November 1947 16	West Bromwich Albion	1–0	Southampton	West Bromwich
	Smith 51'			Stadium: The Hawthorns; Attendance: 35,000

15 November 1947 17	Southampton	4–1	Barnsley	Southampton
	Wayman; Wrigglesworth 39'; Bates 44'		Robledo	Stadium: The Dell; Attendance: 21,563

22 November 1947 18	Plymouth Argyle	3–1	Southampton	Plymouth
	Squires 12'; Tadman 35'; Strauss 86'		Wayman 23'	Stadium: Home Park; Attendance: 21,561

29 November 1947 19	Southampton	3–1	Luton Town	Southampton
	Curtis 12'; Wayman 43'; Ellerington 80'		Soo 87'	Stadium: The Dell; Attendance: 18,369

6 December 1947 20	Brentford	2–2	Southampton	London
	Dawson 40'; Nelson 44'		Day 46'; Wayman 47'	Stadium: Griffin Park; Attendance: 18,660

13 December 1947 21	Southampton	3–1	Leicester City	Southampton
	Wrigglesworth 10'; Bates 35'; Day 65'		Adam 9'	Stadium: The Dell; Attendance: 18,441

20 December 1947 22	Southampton	6–1	Doncaster Rovers	Southampton
	Wayman 5', 77'; Curtis 15'; Ramsey 19'; Wrigglesworth 34'; Day 71'		Gillespie 74'	Stadium: The Dell; Attendance: 17,925

26 December 1947 23	Bradford Park Avenue	1–3	Southampton	Bradford
	Downie		Wayman 5', 79'; Ellerington 15' (pen.)	Stadium: Horsfall Stadium; Attendance: 22,823

27 December 1947 24	Southampton	1–2	Bradford Park Avenue	Southampton
	Greenwood 80' (o.g.)		Henry 44'; Donaldson 70'	Stadium: The Dell; Attendance: 24,734

3 January 1948 25	Leeds United	0–0	Southampton	Leeds
				Stadium: Elland Road; Attendance: 23,194

17 January 1948 26	Bury	3–0	Southampton	Bury
	Bellis 25'; Halton (pen.); Daniel 89'			Stadium: Gigg Lane; Attendance: 13,679

31 January 1948 27	Southampton	3–1	West Ham United	Southampton
	Bates 25', 49'; Wayman 90'		Wright 30'	Stadium: The Dell; Attendance: 20,178

14 February 1948 28	Southampton	5–1	Millwall	Southampton
	Bates 29', 36'; Day 46'; Wayman 54'; Grant 81'		Mansfield 90'	Stadium: The Dell; Attendance: 19,625

21 February 1948 29	Tottenham Hotspur	0–0	Southampton	London
				Stadium: White Hart Lane; Attendance: 29,784

6 March 1948 30	Coventry City	0–1	Southampton	Coventry
			Scott 49'	Stadium: Highfield Road; Attendance: 23,687

13 March 1948 31	Southampton	4–2	Newcastle United	Southampton
	Scott 1'; Wayman 4', 7'; Grant 59'		Sibley 46'; Milburn 88'	Stadium: The Dell; Attendance: 26,780

20 March 1948 32	Birmingham City	0–0	Southampton	Birmingham
				Stadium: St Andrew's; Attendance: 42,000

26 March 1948 33	Southampton	2–1	Nottingham Forest	Southampton
	Wayman 18'; Scott 27'		Lee	Stadium: The Dell; Attendance: 22,788

27 March 1948 34	Southampton	1–1	West Bromwich Albion	Southampton
	Scott 75'		Rowley 65'	Stadium: The Dell; Attendance: 27,330

29 March 1948 35	Nottingham Forest	1–1	Southampton	Nottingham
	Wilkins 68'		Ellerington 44' (pen.)	Stadium: City Ground; Attendance: 24,738

3 April 1948 36	Barnsley	2–1	Southampton	Barnsley
	Harston 55'; Griffiths 79'		Grant 2'	Stadium: Oakwell; Attendance: 20,000

10 April 1948 37	Southampton	2–3	Plymouth Argyle	Southampton
	Wayman 55'		Edds 5', 13', 80'	Stadium: The Dell; Attendance: 20,544

14 April 1948 38	Chesterfield	0–1	Southampton	Chesterfield
			Wayman 27'	Stadium: Saltergate; Attendance: 13,378

17 April 1948 39	Luton Town	0–2	Southampton	Luton
			Ramsey 13' (pen.); Scott 74'	Stadium: Kenilworth Road; Attendance: 17,202

21 April 1948 40	Southampton	1–0	Fulham	Southampton
	Wayman 85'			Stadium: The Dell; Attendance: 15,280

24 April 1948 41	Southampton	2–1	Brentford	Southampton
	Grant 2', 82'		Gibbons 44'	Stadium: The Dell; Attendance: 18,512

28 April 1948 42	Leicester City	0–0	Southampton	Leicester
				Stadium: Filbert Street; Attendance: 17,874

== FA Cup ==
Sunderland (10 January 1948)

Southampton entered the 1947–48 FA Cup in the third round, hosting First Division strugglers Sunderland – who had previously knocked the Saints out of the competition in 1931, 1932 and 1937 – on 10 January 1948. The first half saw both sides enjoying chances on the opposition's goal, with Sunderland initially dominating possession but frequently being denied by the Saints defence (including goalkeeper Ian Black, who was making his home debut). The game remained goalless at half-time, after which the visiting side returned to piling on the pressure, almost scoring through three successive chances for Eddie Burbanks. Around the hour mark, Charlie Wayman came close to scoring for the home side, but his shot hit the post and rebounded off a defender for a corner. It was this set piece which ultimately led to the only goal of the game, when Southampton's Eric Day scrambled the ball into the Sunderland net for 1–0. Both goalkeepers continued to perform in the closing minutes of the game to deny either side another chance.

Blackburn Rovers (24 January 1948)

Another home tie in the fourth round two weeks later saw Southampton hosting Blackburn Rovers who, like Sunderland, were fighting against relegation from the top tier of the Football League. Despite starting well, the Saints went behind after just 11 minutes, when Rovers wing-half Jackie Campbell put the visitors ahead; just a minute later, however, the hosts responded and Eric Day scored an equaliser. Both sides enjoyed a number of chances on goal throughout the rest of the first half, but it was Southampton who made it 2–1 through Charlie Wayman shortly before the break. The home side enjoyed the majority of possession early in the second half, but it was Blackburn who scored next when Charlie McClelland equalised with a close range strike. In the final five minutes, with Southampton on the back foot and a replay looking likely, Day scored his second and the Saints' third of the game to send the Hampshire side through to the fifth round of the FA Cup for the first time since 1927.

Swindon Town (7 February 1948)

Southampton's fifth round tie saw them hosting yet again, this time with Third Division South side Swindon Town making the trip to The Dell, bringing "several thousand" fans to contribute to a season-high attendance of 29,134 (with "thousands" more denied entry). Swindon were reduced to ten men after just eight minutes when right-back Harry Kaye injured his ankle; subsequently, Southampton broke the deadlock after 24 minutes when Charlie Wayman scored "one of the most remarkable goals ever seen in football", according to local newspaper the Southern Daily Echo. Just over ten minutes after the half-time break, the hosts doubled their lead through George Curtis, who headed in from an Alf Ramsey free kick. Two minutes later, it was 3–0 through a Jimmy Ithell own goal, caused by an attack by Wayman.

Tottenham Hotspur (28 February 1948)

In their first sixth round home tie ever, Southampton hosted Second Division rivals Tottenham Hotspur on 28 February 1948. Both teams enjoyed spells of possession and goal-scoring chances in the first 45 minutes – Spurs almost went ahead through Ernie Jones and Len Duquemin on a number of occasions, while the Saints came close just before the break courtesy of a Ted Bates header which was just pushed onto the post by goalkeeper Ted Ditchburn. The first half ended goalless, before Southampton increased the pressure in the second half with plenty of shots and corners in the Spurs half; George Curtis came closest to scoring, when his low shot was cleared off the line by Tottenham full-back Sid Tickridge. It was the visitors, however, who scored the only goal of the fixture in the 75th minute, when Les Bennett scored a goal from 20 yards with his left foot, despite the assertion that he "couldn't kick a ball with his left foot" according to Southampton centre-half Joe Mallett. Southampton were unable to respond and Tottenham went through.

10 January 1948 Round 3	Southampton	1–0	Sunderland	Southampton
	Day			Stadium: The Dell; Attendance: 24,288

24 January 1948 Round 4	Southampton	3–2	Blackburn Rovers	Southampton
	Day 12', 85'; Wayman		Campbell 11'; McClelland	Stadium: The Dell; Attendance: 24,274

7 February 1948 Round 5	Southampton	3–0	Swindon Town	Southampton
	Wayman 24'; Curtis 55'; Ithell 57' (o.g.)			Stadium: The Dell; Attendance: 29,134

28 February 1948 Round 6	Southampton	0–1	Tottenham Hotspur	Southampton
			Bennett 75'	Stadium: The Dell; Attendance: 28,425

== Post-season friendlies ==
Following the end of the league campaign, Southampton embarked on a tour of Brazil to play eight friendly matches. The first four fixtures ended in losses: 0–4 at Fluminense, 1–3 at Botafogo (Bill Ellerington scoring the consolation for the visitors), 2–4 at São Paulo (Saints goals scored by Bill Rochford and Charlie Wayman), and 1–2 at Portuguesa (Wayman scoring for Southampton). The travelling Saints won the next two matches, 2–1 against Corinthians with goals from Wilf Grant and George Curtis, and 3–1 against Flamengo thanks to goals from Wayman (twice) and Augie Scott. The last two games of the Brazilian tour were a 1–2 loss at Vasco da Gama and a 1–1 draw with Minas Gerais (Wayman scored in both games).

16 May 1948 Friendly	Fluminense	4–0	Southampton	Rio de Janeiro, Brazil
	Goal

20 May 1948 Friendly	Botafogo	3–1	Southampton	Rio de Janeiro, Brazil
	Goal		Ellerington

25 May 1948 Friendly	São Paulo	4–2	Southampton	São Paulo, Brazil
	Goal		Rochford; Wayman

29 May 1948 Friendly	Portuguesa	2–1	Southampton
	Goal		Wayman

2 June 1948 Friendly	Corinthians	1–2	Southampton	São Paulo, Brazil
	Goal		Grant; Curtis

6 June 1948 Friendly	Flamengo	1–3	Southampton	Rio de Janeiro, Brazil
	Goal		Wayman; Scott

10 June 1948 Friendly	Vasco da Gama	2–1	Southampton	Rio de Janeiro, Brazil
	Goal		Wayman

13 June 1948 Friendly	Minas Gerais	1–1	Southampton	Belo Horizonte, Brazil
	Goal		Wayman

== Squad statistics ==
Name	Pos.	Nat.	League		FA Cup		Total	
Name	Pos.	Nat.	Apps.	Gls.	Apps.	Gls.	Apps.	Gls.
Ted Ballard	FB	(England)	7	0	0	0	7	0
Ted Bates	FW	(England)	22	10	4	0	26	10
George Beattie	FW	(Scotland)	1	0	0	0	1	0
Ian Black	GK	(Scotland)	17	0	4	0	21	0
Stan Clements	HB	(England)	13	0	0	0	13	0
George Curtis	FW	(England)	41	3	4	1	45	4
Eric Day	FW	(England)	35	10	4	3	39	13
Bill Ellerington	FB	(England)	9	3	1	0	10	3
George Ephgrave	GK	(England)	7	0	0	0	7	0
Wilf Grant	FW	(England)	19	5	1	1	20	6
Jack Gregory	FB	(England)	0	0	0	0	0	0
George Horsfall	HB	(Australia)	0	0	0	0	0	0
George Lewis	FW	(Wales)	15	0	0	0	15	0
Joe Mallett	HB	(England)	32	0	4	0	36	0
Alf Ramsey	FB	(England)	42	5	4	0	46	5
Bill Rochford	FB	(England)	35	0	3	0	38	0
Albie Roles	FB	(England)	0	0	0	0	0	0
Tommy Rudkin	FW	(England)	5	0	1	0	6	0
Augie Scott	FW	(England)	20	5	0	0	20	5
George Smith	HB	(England)	39	0	4	0	43	0
Len Stansbridge	GK	(England)	18	0	0	0	18	0
Bobby Veck	FW	(England)	6	0	0	0	6	0
Charlie Wayman	FW	(England)	27	17	4	2	31	19
Eric Webber	HB	(England)	29	0	4	0	33	0
Len Wilkins	HB	(England)	0	0	0	0	0	0
Billy Wrigglesworth	FW	(England)	12	4	2	0	14	4
Players with appearances who left the club before the end of the season
Jack Bradley	FW	(England)	11	8	0	0	11	8

=== Most appearances ===
No.	Name	Pos.	Nat.	League		FA Cup		Total		
No.	Name	Pos.	Nat.	Apps.	Mins.	Apps.	Mins.	Apps.	Mins.	%
1	Alf Ramsey	FB	(England)	42	3,780	4	360	46	4,140	100%
2	George Curtis	FW	(England)	41	3,690	4	360	45	4,050	97.83%
3	George Smith	HB	(England)	39	3,510	4	360	43	3,870	93.48%
4	Eric Day	FW	(England)	35	3,150	4	360	39	3,510	84.78%
5	Bill Rochford	FB	(England)	35	3,150	3	270	38	3,420	82.61%
6	Joe Mallett	HB	(England)	32	2,880	4	360	36	3,240	78.26%
7	Eric Webber	HB	(England)	29	2,610	4	360	33	2,970	71.74%
8	Charlie Wayman	FW	(England)	27	2,430	4	360	31	2,790	67.39%
9	Ted Bates	FW	(England)	22	1,980	4	360	26	2,340	56.52%
10	Ian Black	GK	(Scotland)	17	1,530	4	360	21	1,890	45.65%

=== Top goalscorers ===
No.	Name	Pos.	Nat.	League		FA Cup		Total		
No.	Name	Pos.	Nat.	Gls.	Apps.	Gls.	Apps.	Gls.	Apps.	GPG
1	Charlie Wayman	FW	(England)	17	27	2	4	19	31	0.61
2	Eric Day	FW	(England)	10	35	3	4	13	39	0.33
3	Ted Bates	FW	(England)	10	22	0	4	10	26	0.38
4	Jack Bradley	FW	(England)	8	11	0	0	8	11	0.73
5	Wilf Grant	FW	(England)	5	19	1	1	6	20	0.30
6	Augie Scott	FW	(England)	5	20	0	0	5	20	0.25
6	Alf Ramsey	FB	(England)	5	42	0	4	5	46	0.11
8	Billy Wrigglesworth	FW	(England)	4	12	0	2	4	16	0.29
8	George Curtis	FW	(England)	3	41	1	4	4	45	0.09
10	Bill Ellerington	FB	(England)	3	9	0	1	3	10	0.30

== Transfers ==
Players transferred in
Date	Pos.	Name	Club	Fee	Ref.
June 1947	FB	(England) Ted Ballard	(England) Leyton Orient	Exchange (Note: Ted Ballard transferred to Southampton in exchange for Bill Stroud moving to Leyton Orient.)	
July 1947	FW	(England) Augie Scott	(England) Luton Town	Free	
August 1947	FW	(Scotland) George Beattie	(Scotland) Rosemount	Free	
August 1947	FW	(England) George Curtis	(England) Arsenal	Exchange (Note: George Curtis and Tommy Rudkin transferred to Southampton in exchange for £12,000 and Don Roper moving to Arsenal.)	
August 1947	FW	(England) Tommy Rudkin	(England) Arsenal	Exchange	
October 1947	FW	(England) Charlie Wayman	(England) Newcastle United	£10,000 (Note: Charlie Wayman's £10,000 transfer fee was a club record at the time.)	
October 1947	FW	(England) Billy Wrigglesworth	(England) Bolton Wanderers	Exchange (Note: Billy Wrigglesworth transferred to Southampton in exchange for £8,000 and Jack Bradley moving to Bolton Wanderers.)	
December 1947	GK	(Scotland) Ian Black	(Scotland) Aberdeen	£1,000	
Players transferred out
Date	Pos.	Name	Club	Fee	Ref.
August 1947	FW	(England) Don Roper	(England) Arsenal	£12,000	
October 1947	FW	(England) Jack Bradley	(England) Bolton Wanderers	£8,000	
Players released
Date	Pos.	Name	Subsequent club	Join date	Ref.
Pre-season	FW	(England) Billy Bevis	(England) Winchester City	September 1947	
Pre-season	HB	(England) Bill Bushby	(England) Cowes Sports	Late 1947	
Pre-season	HB	(England) Ken Fisher	(England) Watford	August 1947	
Pre-season	FW	(England) Alf Freeman	(England) Crystal Palace	August 1948	

== Bibliography ==
- Chalk, Gary; Holley, Duncan; Bull, David (November 2013), All the Saints: A Complete Players' Who's Who of Southampton FC, Bristol, England: Hagiology Publishing, ISBN 978-0-9926864-0-6
- Holley, Duncan; Chalk, Gary (2003), Bull, David (ed.), In That Number: A Post-War Chronicle of Southampton FC, Bristol, England: Hagiology Publishing, ISBN 0-9534474-3-X
