= 1948–49 Southampton F.C. season =

English football club season

Southampton F.C.
1948–49 season
- Chairman: Alf Jukes (died April 1949); Reg Jukes (from April 1949)
- Manager: Bill Dodgin
- Stadium: The Dell
- Second Division: 3rd
- FA Cup: Third round
- Top goalscorer: League: Charlie Wayman (32); All: Charlie Wayman (32)
- Highest home attendance: 30,586 v West Bromwich Albion (23 April 1949)
- Lowest home attendance: 20,937 v Cardiff City (1 January 1949)
- Average home league attendance: 25,465
- Biggest win: 6–0 v Leicester City (23 October 1948)
- Biggest defeat: 0–3 v Barnsley (2 October 1948)
Home colours

The 1948–49 season was the 48th year of competitive football played by Southampton F.C., the club's 22nd season as members of the Football League, and their 20th competing in the Second Division. The Saints finished the campaign in third place in the league table, having gained 55 from a possible 84 points with 23 wins, nine draws and ten losses. The club also competed in the FA Cup, but lost their only fixture in the third round against fellow Second Division side Sheffield Wednesday.

After a strong second half of the 1947–48 season which saw the club finish third in the league table, Southampton continued with the same squad and brought in just one summer signing, Spanish winger José Gallego. The club also sold centre-forward George Lewis to Brighton & Hove Albion, winger Billy Wrigglesworth to Reading, and goalkeeper George Ephgrave to Norwich City. Partway through the season, George Beattie moved to Gloucester City, and the club signed Bill Heaton from Leeds United to cover the team's outside-left position. The 1948–49 season was the last to feature manager Bill Dodgin, who left to join Fulham before the next season.

During the season, 21 players appeared for Southampton in all competitions. Centre-half Eric Webber featured in more games than any other player, being ever present in both the league and FA Cup with 43 appearances. Centre-forward Charlie Wayman finished as Southampton's top scorer with 32 goals in the league – the highest of any division in the Football League that season. The club attracted an average home league attendance at The Dell of 25,465 – almost 5,000 more than the previous year. The highest league attendance was 30,586 in the final home fixture of the season against fellow promotion contenders West Bromwich Albion, which remained the club's record attendance for more than 20 years. The lowest attendance of the season was 20,937 on New Year's Day 1948 against Cardiff City – higher than the 1947–48 average.

== Second Division ==
=== Season summary ===
Southampton's third post-war season started strongly, as they picked up four wins from their opening five fixtures to go straight to the top of the league table – the first game of the campaign was a 3–0 victory over Blackburn Rovers, who had just been relegated from the First Division. The team's form dropped off quickly though, as they won just once (at home to eventual champions Fulham) out of their next six games, in a run which ended in successive losses at Sheffield Wednesday and Barnsley, resulting in a descent to sixth in the league table – the lowest they would be all season. During this period, manager Bill Dodgin claimed that some of the players had a "half-hearted attitude". Squad challenges meant that the Saints struggled to find stability in the outside-left position, deploying eight different players there during the first half of the season.

Despite these difficulties, after dropping to sixth, Southampton went on an unbeaten run of seven games between early October and late November to firmly establish their place in the top three – highlights included a 5–2 win at home to Coventry City, a season-record 6–0 victory over Leicester City in which Charlie Wayman scored five times (the first time a Southampton player had done so in the Football League), and a 3–1 win over fellow promotion hopefuls Tottenham Hotspur. Four wins from the last six fixtures of the calendar year saw the Saints moving up to second in the table by the end of December, as West Bromwich Albion and Spurs dropped points to close the gap to just two points between the three teams fighting for the two promotion spots. On 1 January 1949, Southampton moved back up to the top spot for the first time since the beginning of September with a 2–0 win over Cardiff City. At a friendly against Plymouth Argyle a couple of weeks later, Alf Ramsey picked up a knee injury which kept him out of action for the rest of the season.

Another unbeaten run of 12 matches between the end of December and the beginning of April saw the Saints secure an eight-point lead at the top of the league table, becoming "clear favourites" for promotion. Charlie Wayman continued to lead the team's goal-scoring, while the club also signed Bill Heaton to take over the contentious outside-left position. Wins during the unbeaten run included 3–1 away against Queens Park Rangers, 1–0 over Sheffield Wednesday, and 1–0 away over Tottenham Hotspur. Despite their dominance, Southampton lost their lead at the top of the table with unexpected losses against Bradford Park Avenue, West Ham United and Bury, the latter of which saw a Ted Bates goal controversially disallowed for offside. The side picked up only one win and one draw from their final seven games, attracting a new club record attendance of 30,826 in the penultimate game against West Bromwich Albion; after this game, both West Brom and Fulham had decisive fixtures in hand, leaving Southampton powerless in their quest for promotion.

Losing to Chesterfield in their final game, Southampton remained second in the table, however Fulham's draw with Tottenham saw them move ahead on goal average, and when West Brom won their final two games, the Saints dropped to third and lost out on promotion to the top flight. A feature in local newspaper the Southern Daily Echo described the conclusion of the season as "the end of a tragic slide which must be almost without parallel in football". Charlie Wayman finished as the top goalscorer for the Second Division and the Football League overall in 1948–49, with 32 goals in 37 league appearances. This was Southampton's final season with Bill Dodgin as manager, who suddenly left a few weeks into the 1949–50 pre-season to take over at league champions Fulham, and was replaced by his assistant Sid Cann.

=== Final league table ===
Pos	Team	Pld	W	D	L	GF	GA	GAv	Pts	Qualification or relegation
1	Fulham (C, P)	42	24	9	9	77	37	2.081	57	Promotion to the First Division
2	West Bromwich Albion (P)	42	24	8	10	69	39	1.769	56	Promotion to the First Division
3	Southampton	42	23	9	10	69	36	1.917	55	
4	Cardiff City	42	19	13	10	62	47	1.319	51	
5	Tottenham Hotspur	42	17	16	9	72	44	1.636	50	

Source: RSSSF
Rules for classification: 1) Points; 2) Goal average; 3) Goals scored
(C) Champions; (P) Promoted

=== Results by matchday ===
Round	1	2	3	4	5	6	7	8	9	10	11	12	13	14	15	16	17	18	19	20	21	22	23	24	25	26	27	28	29	30	31	32	33	34	35	36	37	38	39	40	41	42
Ground	H	A	A	H	H	A	A	H	H	A	A	H	A	H	A	H	A	H	A	H	A	A	A	H	H	H	A	H	H	H	A	H	A	H	A	A	H	A	A	H	H	A
Result	W	W	L	W	W	L	D	W	D	L	L	W	D	W	D	W	D	W	L	W	W	W	L	W	W	D	W	W	W	W	D	W	W	W	W	L	L	W	L	D	D	L
Position	1	1	3	2	1	2	2	2	2	3	6	4	4	3	3	3	3	3	3	3	3	2	3	2	1	2	1	1	1	1	1	1	1	1	1	1	1	1	1	1	1	2

Source: statto.com
A = Away; H = Home; W = Win; D = Draw; L = Loss

=== Match reports ===
21 August 1948 1	Southampton	3–0	Blackburn Rovers	Southampton
	Scott 33'; Wayman 70', 84'			Stadium: The Dell; Attendance: 26,018

25 August 1948 2	Plymouth Argyle	1–2	Southampton	Plymouth
	Astall		Wayman 42'; Day 48'	Stadium: Home Park; Attendance: 29,443

28 August 1948 3	Cardiff City	2–1	Southampton	Cardiff
	Hullett 22', 86'		Wayman 27'	Stadium: Ninian Park; Attendance: 40,000

1 September 1948 4	Southampton	2–0	Plymouth Argyle	Southampton
	Wayman 14'; Curtis 66'			Stadium: The Dell; Attendance: 23,613

4 September 1948 5	Southampton	3–0	Queens Park Rangers	Southampton
	Scott 33', 49'; Ramsey 88' (pen.)			Stadium: The Dell; Attendance: 27,600

8 September 1948 6	Fulham	1–0	Southampton	London
	Stevens 32'			Stadium: Craven Cottage; Attendance: 24,700

11 September 1948 7	Luton Town	1–1	Southampton	Luton
	Small 30'		Wayman 17'	Stadium: Kenilworth Road; Attendance: 20,257

15 September 1948 8	Southampton	3–0	Fulham	Southampton
	Day 10'; Wayman			Stadium: The Dell; Attendance: 25,424

18 September 1948 9	Southampton	2–2	Bradford Park Avenue	Southampton
	Wayman 3', 12'		Ainsley 48', 52'	Stadium: The Dell; Attendance: 26,659

25 September 1948 10	Sheffield Wednesday	2–0	Southampton	Sheffield
	Woodhead 70', 75'			Stadium: Hillsborough Stadium; Attendance: 38,347

2 October 1948 11	Barnsley	3–0	Southampton	Barnsley
	Baxter 46'; Smith 70'; Robledo 84'			Stadium: Oakwell; Attendance: 23,168

9 October 1948 12	Southampton	5–2	Coventry City	Southampton
	Grant 43', 67'; Bates 46'; Wayman 48'; Ramsey 68' (pen.)		Warner 15'; Roberts 40'	Stadium: The Dell; Attendance: 23,362

16 October 1948 13	Leeds United	1–1	Southampton	Leeds
	Cochrane 82'		Grant 53'	Stadium: Elland Road; Attendance: 34,300

23 October 1948 14	Southampton	6–0	Leicester City	Southampton
	Wayman 12', 30', 56', 60', 67'; Bates 35'			Stadium: The Dell; Attendance: 23,907

30 October 1948 15	Brentford	0–0	Southampton	London
				Stadium: Griffin Park; Attendance: 29,812

6 November 1948 16	Southampton	3–1	Tottenham Hotspur	Southampton
	Wayman 8'; Day 34'; Bates 77'		Jones 25'	Stadium: The Dell; Attendance: 29,000

13 November 1948 17	West Ham United	1–1	Southampton	London
	Woodgate 27'		Wayman 29'	Stadium: Boleyn Ground; Attendance: 35,000

20 November 1948 18	Southampton	2–0	Bury	Southampton
	Bates 75'; Grant 89'			Stadium: The Dell; Attendance: 25,057

27 November 1948 19	West Bromwich Albion	2–0	Southampton	West Bromwich
	Millard 20'; Elliott 77'			Stadium: The Hawthorns; Attendance: 45,000

4 December 1948 20	Southampton	1–0	Chesterfield	Southampton
	Bates 54'			Stadium: The Dell; Attendance: 22,697

11 December 1948 21	Lincoln City	1–2	Southampton	Lincoln
	Dodds 61'		Wayman 25', 75'	Stadium: Sincil Bank; Attendance: 14,207

18 December 1948 22	Blackburn Rovers	1–2	Southampton	Blackburn
	Westcott 34'		Bates 44', 65'	Stadium: Ewood Park; Attendance: 24,700

25 December 1948 23	Nottingham Forest	2–1	Southampton	Nottingham
	Edwards 48'; Hullett 64'		Curtis 52'	Stadium: City Ground; Attendance: 25,151

27 December 1948 24	Southampton	2–1	Nottingham Forest	Southampton
	Curtis 55'; Wayman 57'		Edwards 56'	Stadium: The Dell; Attendance: 24,330

1 January 1949 25	Southampton	2–0	Cardiff City	Southampton
	Scott 10'; Wayman 61'			Stadium: The Dell; Attendance: 20,937

22 January 1949 26	Southampton	1–1	Luton Town	Southampton
	Wayman 62'		Kiernan 75'	Stadium: The Dell; Attendance: 24,815

29 January 1949 27	Queens Park Rangers	1–3	Southampton	London
	Pointon 80'		Wayman 15'; Ellerington (pen.); Curtis 81'	Stadium: Loftus Road; Attendance: 20,000

12 February 1949 28	Southampton	4–0	Lincoln City	Southampton
	Wayman 33', 57' (pen.); Day; Bates 74'			Stadium: The Dell; Attendance: 22,782

19 February 1949 29	Southampton	1–0	Sheffield Wednesday	Southampton
	Bates 63'			Stadium: The Dell; Attendance: 29,445

26 February 1949 30	Southampton	3–0	Barnsley	Southampton
	Wayman 17'; Day 37'; Curtis 42'			Stadium: The Dell; Attendance: 25,892

5 March 1949 31	Coventry City	2–2	Southampton	Coventry
	Roberts 44'; Murphy		Wayman 13'; Ellerington 53' (pen.)	Stadium: Highfield Road; Attendance: 21,920

12 March 1949 32	Southampton	2–1	Leeds United	Southampton
	Day 33'; Wayman 59'		Webber 78' (o.g.)	Stadium: The Dell; Attendance: 25,736

19 March 1949 33	Leicester City	1–3	Southampton	Leicester
	Lee 33'		Bates 35'; Wayman 41', 87'	Stadium: Filbert Street; Attendance: 32,700

26 March 1949 34	Southampton	2–0	Brentford	Southampton
	Mallett 85'; Bates 87'			Stadium: The Dell; Attendance: 25,217

2 April 1949 35	Tottenham Hotspur	0–1	Southampton	London
			Wayman 82'	Stadium: White Hart Lane; Attendance: 69,625

4 April 1949 36	Bradford Park Avenue	2–0	Southampton	Bradford
	White 59'; Ainsley 72'			Stadium: Horsfall Stadium; Attendance: 92,293

9 April 1949 37	Southampton	0–1	West Ham United	Southampton
			Robinson 78'	Stadium: The Dell; Attendance: 25,644

15 April 1949 38	Grimsby Town	0–1	Southampton	Cleethorpes
			Ellerington 89' (pen.)	Stadium: Blundell Park; Attendance: 25,931

16 April 1949 39	Bury	1–0	Southampton	Bury
	Bodle 57'			Stadium: Gigg Lane; Attendance: 20,355

18 April 1949 40	Southampton	0–0	Grimsby Town	Southampton
				Stadium: The Dell; Attendance: 26,064

23 April 1949 41	Southampton	1–1	West Bromwich Albion	Southampton
	Day 87'		Smith 63'	Stadium: The Dell; Attendance: 30,586

30 April 1949 42	Chesterfield	1–0	Southampton	Chesterfield
	McJarrow 57'			Stadium: Saltergate; Attendance: 12,801

== FA Cup ==
Sheffield Wednesday (8 January 1949)

Southampton entered the 1948–49 FA Cup in the third round, travelling to face fellow Second Division side Sheffield Wednesday four months after losing 0–2 to them in the league. Despite enjoying the share of chances on goal, the Saints went behind after 25 minutes when Jimmy Dailey converted a "precision cross" from Dennis Woodhead. Only six minutes later, however, the visitors equalised through a 25-yard shot from Wilf Grant; it remained level going into half-time, after goalkeeper Ian Black made a "sensational" save from a Redfern Froggatt effort. The hosts slowly took control of the game in the second half, and in the 68th minute made it 2–1 through Eddie Quigley. Joe Mallett almost scored at the end, but Sheffield goalkeeper Dave McIntosh denied him and it ended with the visitors exiting the tournament.

8 January 1949 Round 3	Sheffield Wednesday	2–1	Southampton	Sheffield
	Dailey 25'; Quigley 68'		Grant 31'	Stadium: Hillsborough Stadium; Attendance: 44,292

== Additional friendly ==
Southampton played one friendly during the 1948–49 season, beating fellow Second Division side Plymouth Argyle 1–0 on 15 January 1949, the only goal scored by José Gallego.

15 January 1949 Friendly	Southampton	1–0	Plymouth Argyle	Plymouth
	Gallego			Stadium: Home Park

== Squad statistics ==
Name	Pos.	Nat.	League		FA Cup		Total	
Name	Pos.	Nat.	Apps.	Gls.	Apps.	Gls.	Apps.	Gls.
Ted Ballard	FB	(England)	0	0	0	0	0	0
Ted Bates	FW	(England)	34	11	1	0	35	11
Ian Black	GK	(Scotland)	41	0	1	0	42	0
Stan Clements	HB	(England)	0	0	0	0	0	0
George Curtis	FW	(England)	40	5	1	0	41	5
Eric Day	FW	(England)	37	7	0	0	37	7
Bill Ellerington	FB	(England)	20	3	0	0	20	3
José Gallego	FW	(Spain)	1	0	0	0	1	0
Wilf Grant	FW	(England)	17	4	1	1	18	5
Jack Gregory	FB	(England)	0	0	0	0	0	0
Bill Heaton	FW	(England)	15	0	0	0	15	0
George Horsfall	HB	(Australia)	0	0	0	0	0	0
Joe Mallett	HB	(England)	41	1	1	0	42	1
John Mitchell	FW	(England)	0	0	0	0	0	0
Alf Ramsey	FB	(England)	25	2	1	0	26	2
Bill Rochford	FB	(England)	38	0	1	0	39	0
Albie Roles	FB	(England)	1	0	0	0	1	0
Tommy Rudkin	FW	(England)	4	0	0	0	4	0
Augie Scott	FW	(England)	22	4	1	0	23	4
George Smith	HB	(England)	13	0	0	0	13	0
Len Stansbridge	GK	(England)	1	0	0	0	1	0
Bobby Veck	FW	(England)	3	0	0	0	3	0
Charlie Wayman	FW	(England)	37	32	1	0	38	32
Eric Webber	HB	(England)	42	0	1	0	43	0
Ron Wheatley	HB	(England)	1	0	0	0	1	0
Len Wilkins	HB	(England)	29	0	1	0	30	0

=== Most appearances ===
No.	Name	Pos.	Nat.	League		FA Cup		Total		
No.	Name	Pos.	Nat.	Apps.	Mins.	Apps.	Mins.	Apps.	Mins.	%
1	Eric Webber	HB	(England)	42	3,780	1	90	43	3,870	100%
2	Ian Black	GK	(Scotland)	41	3,690	1	90	42	3,780	97.67%
2	Joe Mallett	HB	(England)	41	3,690	1	90	42	3,780	97.67%
4	George Curtis	FW	(England)	40	3,600	1	90	41	3,690	95.35%
5	Bill Rochford	FB	(England)	38	3,420	1	90	39	3,510	90.70%
6	Charlie Wayman	FW	(England)	37	3,330	1	90	38	3,420	88.37%
7	Eric Day	FW	(England)	37	3,330	0	0	37	3,330	86.05%
8	Ted Bates	FW	(England)	34	3,060	1	90	35	3,150	81.40%
9	Len Wilkins	HB	(England)	29	2,610	1	90	30	2,700	69.77%
10	Alf Ramsey	FB	(England)	25	2,250	1	90	26	2,340	60.47%

=== Top goalscorers ===
No.	Name	Pos.	Nat.	League		FA Cup		Total		
No.	Name	Pos.	Nat.	Gls.	Apps.	Gls.	Apps.	Gls.	Apps.	GPG
1	Charlie Wayman	FW	(England)	32	37	0	1	32	38	0.84
2	Ted Bates	FW	(England)	11	34	0	1	11	35	0.31
3	Eric Day	FW	(England)	7	37	0	0	7	37	0.19
4	Wilf Grant	FW	(England)	4	17	1	1	5	18	0.28
4	George Curtis	FW	(England)	5	40	0	1	5	41	0.12
6	Augie Scott	FW	(England)	4	22	0	1	4	23	0.17
7	Bill Ellerington	FB	(England)	3	20	0	0	3	20	0.15
8	Alf Ramsey	FB	(England)	2	25	0	1	2	26	0.08
9	Joe Mallett	HB	(England)	1	41	0	1	1	42	0.02

== Transfers ==
Players transferred in
Date	Pos.	Name	Club	Fee	Ref.
May 1948	FW	(Spain) José Gallego	(England) Brentford	Free	
January 1949	HB	(England) Ron Wheatley	(England) Nottingham Forest	Free	
February 1949	FW	(England) Bill Heaton	(England) Leeds United	£7,000	
March 1949	FW	(England) John Mitchell	(England) Gosport Athletic	Free	
Players transferred out
Date	Pos.	Name	Club	Fee	Ref.
June 1948	FW	(Wales) George Lewis	(England) Brighton & Hove Albion	Free	
June 1948	FW	(England) Billy Wrigglesworth	(England) Reading	Free	
July 1948	GK	(England) George Ephgrave	(England) Norwich City	Free	
December 1948	FW	(Scotland) George Beattie	(England) Gloucester City	Free	

== Bibliography ==
- Chalk, Gary; Holley, Duncan; Bull, David (November 2013), All the Saints: A Complete Players' Who's Who of Southampton FC, Bristol, England: Hagiology Publishing, ISBN 978-0-9926864-0-6
- Holley, Duncan; Chalk, Gary (2003), Bull, David (ed.), In That Number: A Post-War Chronicle of Southampton FC, Bristol, England: Hagiology Publishing, ISBN 0-9534474-3-X
