= List of Bradford (Park Avenue) A.F.C. seasons =

This is a list of Bradford (Park Avenue) A.F.C. seasons in English football, from 1907 when the club joined the Southern League to the 2019–20 season. It details the club's achievements in senior league and cup competitions.

Bradford (Park Avenue) were formed in 1863 originally as a rugby union team, in 1895 they joined the breakaway Northern Rugby Football Union and played what would become known as rugby league until 1907 when they turned to football and joined the Southern League. The following season they successfully applied to join the English Football League, becoming the second team from Bradford to join the league after Bradford City five years previously. The club won just one title during its 51 years in the Football League, when it topped Division Three (North) in 1927–28, and also spent three seasons in the top flight of English football. In each of the four seasons from 1966–67 to 1969–70 the club had to apply for re-election and was eventually voted out of the league to be replaced by Cambridge United in 1970. For four seasons they competed in the Northern Premier League before the club folded in 1974.

A new club was reformed in 1977 originally playing Sunday league football before it joined the Central Midlands Football League in 1989–90 and has won two league titles since. In 2004–05 Park Avenue were playing in the Conference North just two divisions below the Football League, but two successive relegations followed. However, the club managed to regain their position in this league and in 2013–14 in English football Park Avenue play in the Conference North.

== League history ==
Years	∆	League
1907–1908	3	Southern Football League Division One
1908-1914	2	Football League Second Division
1914-1921	1	Football League First Division
1921-1922	2	Football League Second Division
1922-1928	3	Football League Third Division North
1928-1950	2	Football League Second Division
1950-1958	3	Football League Third Division North
1958-1961	4	Football League Fourth Division
1961-1963	3	Football League Third Division
1963-1970	4	Football League Fourth Division
1970-1974	7	Northern Premier League
1989-1990	11	Central Midlands League Superior
1990-1991	10	North West Counties Football League Division Two
1991-1995	9	North West Counties Football League Division One
1995-2001	8	Northern Premier League Division One
2001-2004	7	Northern Premier League Division Premier
2004-2005	6	Conference North
2005-2006	7	Northern Premier League Division Premier
2006-2007	8	Northern Premier League Division One
2007-2008	8	Northern Premier League Division One North
2008-2012	7	Northern Premier League Division Premier
2012-2015	6	Conference North
2015-2023	6	National League North
2023-2024	7	Northern Premier League Division Premier
2024-2026	8	Northern Premier League Division One East

== Seasons ==
Season	League									FA Cup	League Cup (Note: The League Cup was founded in the 1960–61 season.)	Other		Top scorer (Note: Figures include goals in the Football and Premier Leagues, FA Cup, League Cup, European competitions, playoffs/test matches, Full Members Cup, Football League Trophy, Football League Group Cup and the Football League Third Division (North) Challenge Cup.)	
Season	Division	P	W	D	L	F	A	Pts	Pos	FA Cup	League Cup	Other		Top scorer	
1907–08	South 1 (Note: Replaced Fulham in Southern League following unsuccessful application to the English Football League.)	38	12	12	14	53	54	36	13th						
1908–09	Div 2 (Note: Elected to the Football League.)	38	13	6	19	51	59	32	16th	5Q				Joe McClarence	14
1909–10	Div 2	38	17	4	17	64	64	59	10th	R2				Frank Newton	13
1910–11	Div 2	38	14	9	15	53	55	37	12th	R2				Tommy Little	21
1911–12	Div 2	38	13	9	16	44	45	35	11th	R3				Jimmy Turnbull	9
1912–13	Div 2	38	14	8	16	60	60	36	13th	QF				Jimmy Smith	21
1913–14	Div 2	38	23	3	12	71	47	49	2nd	R2				Jimmy Smith	27
1914–15	Div 1	38	17	7	14	69	65	41	9th	R3				Jimmy Bauchop	29
1915–19	No competitive football was played between 1915 and 1919 due to the First World War.														
1919–20	Div 1	42	15	12	15	60	63	42	11th	QF				David McLean	23
1920–21	Div 1	42	8	8	26	43	76	24	22nd	R2				David McLean	22
1921–22	Div 2	42	12	9	21	46	62	33	21st	R2				Jimmy Bauchop	15
1922–23	Div 3N	38	19	9	10	67	38	47	2nd	R2				George McLean	21
1923–24	Div 3N	42	21	10	11	69	43	52	5th	R1				Ken McDonald	17
1924–25	Div 3N	42	19	12	11	84	42	50	5th	R2				Bob Wilson	25
1925–26	Div 3N	42	26	8	8	101	43	60	2nd	R2				Ken McDonald	46
1926–27	Div 3N	42	24	7	11	101	59	55	3rd	R1				Ken McDonald	39
1927–28	Div 3N	42	27	9	6	101	45	63	1st	R2				Ken McDonald	29
1928–29	Div 2	42	22	4	16	88	70	48	3rd	R5				George McLean	29
1929–30	Div 2	42	19	12	11	91	70	50	4th	R5				George McLean	21
1930–31	Div 2	42	18	10	14	97	66	46	6th	R5				Trevor Rhodes	20
1931–32	Div 2	42	21	7	14	72	63	49	6th	R5				Eddie Parris	13
1932–33	Div 2	42	17	8	17	77	71	42	8th	R4				Ernie Suggett	22
1933–34	Div 2	42	23	3	16	86	67	49	5th	R3				Harold Blackmore	27
1934–35	Div 2	42	11	16	15	55	63	38	15th	R3				Tommy Lewis; Jimmy Robertson; Ernie Suggett	9
1935–36	Div 2	42	14	9	19	62	84	37	16th	R5				Tom Nolan	17
1936–37	Div 2	42	12	9	21	52	88	33	20th	R3				Tony MacPhee	18
1937–38	Div 2	42	17	9	16	69	56	43	7th	R5				George Henson	32
1938–39	Div 2	42	12	11	19	61	82	35	17th	R3				Fred Smith	21
1939–40 (Note: The 1939–40 season was abandoned in early September and all results annulled, after only three matches had been played.)	Div 2	3	0	1	2	2	7	1	22nd					Tommy McGarry; Edwin Watson	1
1939–45	No competitive football was played between 1939 and 1945 due to the Second World War.														
1945–46	There was no league football in 1945–46									QF (Note: All FA Cup ties in 1945–46 were played on a two legged basis.)				Jackie Gibbons	8
1946–47	Div 2	42	14	11	17	65	77	39	16th	R3				Jackie Gibbons	21
1947–48	Div 2	42	16	8	18	68	72	40	14th	R4				John Downie	19
1948–49	Div 2	42	13	11	18	65	78	37	17th	R4				George Ainsley	16
1949–50	Div 2	42	10	11	21	51	77	31	22nd	R3				Gerry Henry	11
1950–51	Div 3N	46	23	8	15	90	72	54	6th	R2				Bob Crosbie	28
1951–52	Div 3N	46	19	12	15	74	64	50	8th	R4				Phil Turner	27
1952–53	Div 3N	46	19	12	15	75	61	50	7th	R2				Bob Crosbie	16
1953–54	Div 3N	46	18	14	14	77	68	50	9th	R3				Len Pickard	23
1954–55	Div 3N	46	15	11	20	56	70	41	16th	R2				Andy McLaren; Len Pickard	8
1955–56	Div 3N	46	13	7	26	61	122	33	23rd (Note: The club successfully applied for re-election to the Football League.)	R3				Whelan Ward	15
1956–57	Div 3N	46	16	3	27	66	93	35	20th	R2				Barry Smith	29
1957–58	Div 3N	46	13	11	22	68	95	37	22nd	R1				Alvan Williams	17
1958–59	Div 4 (Note: Bradford Park Avenue were placed in Division Four on league reorganisation.)	46	18	7	21	75	77	43	14th	R2				John Buchanan	23
1959–60	Div 4	46	17	15	14	70	68	49	11th	R3				John Allan	31
1960–61	Div 4	46	26	8	12	84	74	60	4th	R1	R2			John Buchanan	21
1961–62	Div 3	46	20	7	19	80	78	47	11th	R1	R1			Tommy Spratt	22
1962–63	Div 3	46	14	12	20	79	97	40	21st	R1	R3			Kevin Hector	19
1963–64	Div 4	46	18	9	19	75	81	45	13th	R2	R3			Kevin Hector	21
1964–65	Div 4	46	20	17	9	86	62	57	7th	R1	R1			Kevin Hector	30
1965–66	Div 4	46	21	5	20	102	92	47	11th	R1	R2			Kevin Hector	45
1966–67	Div 4	46	11	13	22	52	79	35	23rd	R3	R2			Bobby Ham	17
1967–68	Div 4	46	4	15	27	30	82	23	24th	R2	R1			Geoff Lloyd	12
1968–69	Div 4	46	5	10	31	32	106	20	24th	R1	R1			Derek Draper	7
1969–70	Div 4	46	6	11	29	41	96	23	24th (Note: Bradford Park Avenue failed in their re-election bid and were replaced in the league by Cambridge United.)	R1	R1			Ray Charnley	12
1970–71	NPL	42	15	8	19	54	73	38	14th	R1		FA Trophy	R1		
1971–72	NPL	46	13	13	20	54	71	39	18th	4Q		FA Trophy	R1		
1972–73	NPL	46	19	17	10	63	50	55	5th	3Q		FA Trophy	R2		
1973–74	NPL	46	9	15	22	42	84	33	21st (Note: Bradford Park Avenue folded in 1974 following the end of the season.)	3Q		FA Trophy	R1		
1974–75															
1975–76															
1976–77															
1977–78															
1978–79															
1979–80															
1980–81															
1981–82															
1982–83															
1983–84															
1984–85															
1985–86															
1986–87															
1987–88															
1988–89															
1989–90	CML	38	11	8	19	59	83	41	16th						
1990–91	NWC 2	34	20	9	5	72	41	69	3rd						
1991–92	NWC 1	34	10	5	19	57	68	35	17th			FA Vase	EP		
1992–93	NWC 1	42	19	8	15	54	43	65	6th	2Q		FA Vase	R1		
1993–94	NWC 1	42	12	12	18	54	79	48	15th	PR		FA Vase	PR		
1994–95	NWC 1	42	30	4	8	96	43	94	1st	PR		FA Vase	R2		
1995–96	NPL 1	40	9	14	17	57	72	41	17th	4Q		FA Trophy	1Q		
1996–97	NPL 1	42	20	8	14	58	50	68	7th	2Q		FA Trophy	R2		
1997–98	NPL 1	42	18	11	13	62	46	65	9th	PR		FA Trophy	3Q		
1998–99	NPL 1	42	17	11	14	64	55	62	9th	3Q		FA Trophy	R4		
1999–2000	NPL 1	42	23	9	10	77	48	78	4th	2Q		FA Trophy	R1		
2000–01	NPL 1	42	28	5	9	83	40	89	1st	1Q		FA Trophy	R1		
2001–02	NPL P	44	18	5	21	77	76	59	10th	3Q		FA Trophy	R1		
2002–03	NPL P	44	20	10	14	73	70	70	7th	3Q		FA Trophy	R2		
2003–04	NPL P	44	12	14	18	48	62	50	17th	R1		FA Trophy	R3		
2004–05	CONF N (Note: Bradford Park Avenue were placed in the Conference North on league reorganisation following play-off games with Spennymoor United, Ashton United and Burscough.)	42	5	9	28	37	70	24	22nd	3Q		FA Trophy	R1		
2005–06	NPL P	42	10	9	23	64	86	39	21st	2Q		FA Trophy	1Q		
2006–07	NPL 1	46	24	10	12	77	47	82	4th	PR		FA Trophy	3Q		
2007–08	NPL 1N	42	25	7	10	91	43	82	1st	4Q		FA Trophy	1Q		
2008–09	NPL P	42	20	12	10	74	52	72	7th	2Q		FA Trophy	1Q		
2009–10	NPL P	38	24	6	8	94	51	78	2nd	3Q		FA Trophy	1Q		
2010–11	NPL P	42	23	8	11	84	55	77	3rd	1Q		FA Trophy	1Q		
2011–12	NPL P	42	24	6	12	77	49	78	4th	R1		FA Trophy	1Q		
2012–13	CONF N	42	19	9	14	75	52	66	7th	R1		FA Trophy	3Q		
2013–14	CONF N	42	15	12	15	66	70	57	10th	4Q		FA Trophy	R2		
2014–15	CONF N	42	14	11	17	52	66	53	13th	2Q		FA Trophy	R1		
2015–16	NL N	42	13	11	18	51	59	50	14th	3Q		FA Trophy	R2		
2016–17	NL N	42	12	7	23	46	74	43	16th	2Q		FA Trophy	3Q		
2017–18	NL N	42	18	9	15	66	56	63	7th (Note: Bradford Park Avenue beat Kidderminster Harriers in the play-off qualifying round but lost to Brackley Town in the semi-final.)	3Q		FA Trophy	3Q		
2018–19	NL N	42	18	11	13	71	61	65	7th (Note: Lost in the play-off quarter-finals 1–0 to Spennymoor Town.)	3Q		FA Trophy	3Q		
2019–20	NL N	33	5	5	23	25	80	20	22nd (Note: Due to COVID-19 The league was not completed this season.)	2Q		FA Trophy	R1	Lewis Knight	7
2020–21	NL N	16	4	6	6	26	30	18	15th (Note: Due to COVID-19 The league was declared null and void on 18 February 2021.)	2Q		FA Trophy	R2	Lewis Knight	11
2021–22	NL N	42	11	11	20	44	46	70	18th	2Q		FA Trophy	R3	Brad Dockerty	13
2022–23	NL N	46	11	13	22	46	43	65	23rd	2Q		FA Trophy	R2	Will Longbottom	13
2023–24	NPL P	40	7	9	24	50	85	30	19th	2Q		FA Trophy	3Q	Jordan Preston	9
2024–25	NPL D1E	42	16	9	17	62	58	57	10th	PR		FA Trophy	2Q	Paddy Sykes	11
2025–26	NPL D1E	42	21	12	9	67	34	75	5th (Note: Bradford Park Avenue beat Matlock Town in the play-off semi-finals but lost to Emley in the final.)	PR		FA Trophy	R2		

== Key ==
- P = Played
- W = Games won
- D = Games drawn
- L = Games lost
- F = Goals for
- A = Goals against
- Pts = Points
- Pos = Final position
- Div 1 = Football League First Division
- Div 2 = Football League Second Division
- Div 3 = Football League Third Division
- Div 3N = Football League Third Division North
- Div 4 = Football League Fourth Division
- South 1 = Southern League Division One
- Conf N = Conference North
- NPL P = Northern Premier League Premier Division
- NPL 1 = Northern Premier League Division One
- NPL 1N = Northern Premier League Division One North
- CML = Central Midlands League Supreme Division
- NWC 1 = North West Counties Football League Division One
- NWC 2 = North West Counties Football League Division Two
- n/a = Not applicable
- EP = Extra Preliminary Round
- PR = Preliminary Round
- 1Q = First Qualifying Round
- 2Q = Second Qualifying Round
- 3Q = Third Qualifying Round
- 4Q = Fourth Qualifying Round
- 5Q = Fifth Qualifying Round
- R1 = Round 1
- R2 = Round 2
- R3 = Round 3
- R4 = Round 4
- R5 = Round 5
- QF = Quarter-finals
- SF = Semi-finals
- RU = Runners-up
- W = Winners

Champions	Runners-up	Promoted	Relegated

Division shown in bold when it changes due to promotion or relegation. Top scorer shown in bold when he set or equalled a club record.
