= Eddie Thomas (footballer, born 1932) =

English footballer (1932–2020)

Personal information
- Full name: Edwin Henry Charles Thomas
- Date of birth: 9 November 1932
- Place of birth: Swindon, England
- Date of death: 23 September 2020 (aged 87)
- Height: 5 ft 10 in (1.78 m)
- Position: Goalkeeper

Youth career
- Swindon Railway Works XI
- 1949–1950: Southampton

Senior career*
Years	Team	Apps	(Gls)
1950–1953	Southampton	8	(0)
1956	Salisbury		
- * Club domestic league appearances and goals

Edwin Henry Charles Thomas (9 November 1932 – 23 September 2020) was an English footballer, who played as a goalkeeper for Southampton in the early 1950s.

== Football career ==
Thomas was born in Swindon, Wiltshire where he became an apprentice engineer with British Rail at the Swindon Works. Whilst playing for the works team, he caught the eye of a scout from Southampton of the Football League Second Division, joining them as an amateur in 1949.

He made his reserve team debut on 17 December 1949, displacing Len Stansbridge, and over the next year, he and Stansbridge vied for the role of second choice 'keeper behind Scottish international Ian Black. Black moved to Fulham in July 1950, with Northern Irish international Hugh Kelly joining the Saints in exchange. On 7 October 1950, Kelly was called into the Northern Irish team for a match against England and manager Sid Cann promoted Thomas to the first-team for a match against Birmingham City. At a month before his 18th birthday, Thomas thus became Southampton's youngest-ever first-team goalkeeper, until the debut of Bob Charles in 1959. Although the match was lost 2–0, Thomas was not deemed to be at fault for either of the goals.

Thomas briefly became the second-choice 'keeper for the first eleven, making four further appearances before Christmas, but the signing of John Christie in January 1951 relegated him back to the reserves. Thomas was signed as a professional in May 1951, having gained three England Youth caps.

In September 1951, Thomas was recalled to the first-team following a poor match by Christie, but after three matches Stansbridge took over until the arrival of Fred Kiernan in October. By November, Thomas has also lost his place in the reserves to Stansbridge and, unable to regain his place, he was released in the summer of 1953.

== Later career ==
Although he turned out for Salisbury in 1956, Thomas was unable to continue his professional career. He later represented Wiltshire at water polo.

== Death ==
Thomas died on 23 September 2020 aged 87.
