= Daniel Smith =

Daniel Smith may refer to:

== Entertainment ==
- Daniel Smith (artist), American painter
- Daniel Arthur Smith (born 1968), American science fiction writer
- Daniel Browning Smith (born 1979), American television actor
- Daniel Wayne Smith (1986–2006), American actor and son of Anna Nicole Smith

== Sports ==
- Daniel Smith (goalkeeper) (fl. 1923), football player for Port Vale
- Daniel Smith (footballer, born 1982), English footballer
- Daniel Smith (Australian cricketer) (born 1982)
- Daniel Smith (South African cricketer) (born 2002)
- Daniel Smith (rugby league) (born 1993), rugby league player
- Daniel Smith (swimmer) (born 1991), Australian
- Daniel Smith (Filipino cricketer) (born 1992), Filipino cricketer

== Other ==
- Daniel Smith (art materials), art supply manufacturer and retailer
- Daniel Smith (Tennessee politician) (1748–1818), American surveyor, soldier, and senator
- Daniel B. Smith (1792–1883), American educator and pharmacist
- Daniel Bennett Smith (born 1956), American diplomat
- Daniel Wakefield Smith (born 1973), American photojournalist
- Daniel Smith (writer) (born 1977), American journalist
- Daniel Smith (philosopher) (born 1958), American philosopher, academic, researcher, and translator
- P. Daniel Smith, United States government administrator

== See also ==
- Dan Smith (disambiguation)
- Danny Smith (disambiguation)
- Danielle Smith (disambiguation)
