= Hugh Kelly (footballer, born 1919) =

Irish footballer (1919-1977)

Personal information
- Full name: Hugh Redmond Kelly
- Date of birth: 17 August 1919
- Place of birth: Lurgan, Ireland
- Date of death: 30 September 1977 (aged 58)
- Place of death: Belfast, Northern Ireland
- Height: 6 ft 0 in (1.83 m)
- Position: Goalkeeper

Senior career*
Years	Team	Apps	(Gls)
1936–1941	Glenavon		
1941–1949	Belfast Celtic		
1949–1950	Fulham	25	(0)
1950–1952	Southampton	28	(0)
1952–1956	Exeter City	99	(0)
1956–19??	Weymouth		

International career
1949–1950	Ireland	4	(0)
- * Club domestic league appearances and goals

Hugh Redmond Kelly (17 August 1919 – 30 September 1977) was an Irish professional footballer who played as a goalkeeper for various clubs in Northern Ireland and England, making four international appearances for Ireland.

== Football career ==
=== Northern Ireland ===
Kelly was born in Lurgan and played Gaelic football with Clan na Gael while working in the family drapery firm. He also represented Armagh in Gaelic handball. He was invited to play Association football for Glenavon by manager Andy Wylie, who had been impressed with his ball-handling skills.

He started his career with Glenavon as an inside-forward, but played as goalkeeper when the regular custodian failed to arrive for a match. He became established as the first choice goalkeeper for Glenavon from early in 1937, and soon became recognised as one of the best goalkeepers in Northern Ireland, being selected to represent the Irish League XI against a Scottish Football League XI in September 1938.

In 1940, he helped Glenavon reach the final of the Irish Cup, losing 2–0 to Ballymena United. In January 1941, Glenavon suffered a nightmare defeat at the hands of Belfast Celtic, losing 13–0 with Peter O'Connor scoring eleven – this remains an individual British Isles record.

Despite this embarrassing defeat, Belfast Celtic's manager, Elisha Scott (a former goalkeeper), signed Kelly in the summer of 1941 to replace Tommy Breen. Whilst with the Celtic Park club, Kelly claimed two Irish Cup winner's medals with victories over Glentoran in 1943 (1–0) and Linfield in 1944 (3–1).

Kelly may have claimed more honours but a contractual dispute left him on the side-lines for some time. Never afraid to stand-up to authority, when he was reprimanded by Scott with the words, "My grandmother could have played better out there", Kelly adjusted the following week's team-sheet, putting a line through his own name and replacing it with "Lish's granny".

Kelly made his final appearances for the club during their spring 1949 tour of the United States; during that tour, Belfast Celtic defeated Scotland 2–0 with Kelly in goal. By this time, Belfast Celtic were embroiled in financial problems and about to quit the Irish League and were eventually disbanded. To raise funds, Kelly and three of his team-mates (including Johnny Campbell) had been sold to Fulham for a combined fee of £25,000 before the tour to America.

=== England ===
At Fulham, Kelly took the place of another Irish international goalkeeper, Ted Hinton, who was transferred to Millwall. He spent one season at Craven Cottage in the Football League First Division, with the club finishing 17th in the table. He became noted as one of the heaviest goalkeepers in the Football League, with his weight reaching nearly 14 stone.

Kelly earned his first international cap on 16 November 1949 against England in a World Cup qualifier, replacing his namesake Pat Kelly who had conceded eight goals in the previous international against the Scots. Hugh Kelly conceded nine goals against the English, of which four were scored by Jack Rowley and two each by Jack Froggatt and Stan Mortensen. Despite the margin of defeat, Kelly was awarded his second cap, against Wales on 8 March 1950, this time keeping a clean sheet in a goalless draw.

In August 1950, he dropped down to the Second Division, when he joined Southampton in a straight swap for Scottish international 'keeper, Ian Black.

At The Dell, Kelly earned a reputation as a "colourful character", who would often gather the ball single-handed as in Gaelic Football. During his first season with the "Saints", Kelly earned a further two international caps against England (lost 4–1) and Scotland (lost 6–1), before Hinton was recalled.

By the end of the season, Kelly had fallen out of favour with the Southampton manager, Sid Cann, following disciplinary problems after a match at Leicester in April 1951. After the match, the team stayed in the Midlands to play a friendly match at Boston. Kelly returned to the team hotel with Ken Chisholm of Coventry City and two young ladies. When the Southampton trainer, Jimmy Easson, tried to get the ladies to leave, he and Kelly had an argument which culminated in Kelly giving the trainer a black eye. As a result, Kelly was immediately placed on the transfer-list, with John Christie taking over from him in goal for the last two matches of the season. By now completely out of favour, Kelly was fifth choice 'keeper behind Fred Kiernan, Christie, Len Stansbridge and Eddie Thomas and was unable even to get a match in the reserves, spending the whole of 1951–52 on the sidelines, with some time back in Ireland.

Eventually, he was "rescued" by Exeter City, whom he joined in June 1952, spending four years in Devon before winding up his career at Weymouth.

== International appearances ==
Kelly made four appearances for Ireland in international matches as follows:

Date	Venue	Opponent	Result	Goals	Competition
16 November 1949	Maine Road, Manchester	England	2–9	0	World Cup qualifier
8 March 1950	Racecourse Ground, Wrexham	Wales	0–0	0	World Cup qualifier
7 October 1950	Windsor Park, Belfast	England	1–4	0	British Home Championship
1 November 1950	Hampden Park, Glasgow	Scotland	1–6	0	British Home Championship

== Honours ==
Glenavon

- Irish Cup finalist: 1940

Belfast Celtic

- Irish Cup winners: 1943, 1944
- Irish League champions: 1947–48
