= Aubrey Powell (footballer) =

Welsh footballer

Personal information
- Full name: Aubrey Powell
- Date of birth: 19 April 1918
- Place of birth: Cwmtwrch, Wales
- Date of death: 27 January 2009 (aged 90)
- Place of death: Leeds, England
- Position: Inside forward

Youth career
- –: Swansea Town

Senior career*
Years	Team	Apps	(Gls)
1935–1948	Leeds United	112	(25)
1948–1950	Everton	35	(5)
1950–1951	Birmingham City	5	(1)

International career
1946–1950	Wales	8	(1)
- * Club domestic league appearances and goals

Aubrey Powell (19 April 1918 – 27 January 2009) was a footballer who played eight official matches for Wales, plus four wartime internationals.

Powell began his career at Leeds United in 1935, having previously been on the books of Swansea Town, and made his debut for Leeds a year later. However, his career had just got underway when he had a career-threatening leg fracture during a game. It was 18 months before he resumed his career – and less than a year later, the Second World War broke out. He played a total of 112 league games for Leeds, scoring 25 goals.

Powell continued playing for the Leeds United throughout the war in the Wartime League, as well as playing for Wales during this time. He played 123 times in Wartime League games, scoring 37 goals, and scored 1 goal in 3 appearances in the Football League War Cup for Leeds. Powell was second only to Gerry Henry in wartime appearances for the club by an individual player. Wartime appearances and goals are typically not acknowledged as counting for career goals and appearance. Powell is one of only 66 players that have made over 200 appearances for Leeds United if his wartime games are taken into account.

Powell joined Everton in 1948 for £10,000, a club record fee at the time. He spent two seasons at Goodison, before finishing his career with a season at Birmingham City.
