= Danny Smith =

Danny Smith may refer to:

- Danny Smith (footballer) (1921–1998), Scottish
- Danny Smith (athlete) (1952–1983), Olympic sprinter
- Danny Smith (American football) (born 1953), for the Pittsburgh Steelers
- Danny Smith (writer) (born 1959), on TV show Family Guy
- Danny Smith (actor) (born 1973), Canadian

== See also ==
- Daniel Smith (disambiguation)
- Dan Smith (disambiguation)
- Danny Smythe (1948–2016), American drummer for The Box Tops
