= Anthony Godfrey =

Anthony Godfrey may refer to:

- Anthony F. Godfrey, American diplomat
- Anthony Godfrey (politician) (died 1840), politician from Newfoundland.

== See also ==
- Tony Godfrey (born 1939), English footballer
