= Dan Smith =

Dan Smith may refer to:

== Entertainment ==
- Dan Smith (artist) (20th–21st century), American illustrator
- Dan Smith (singer) (born 1986), British vocalist for the band Bastille
- Dan Smith (21st century), American vocalist for Listener
- Dan Smith (guitarist) (21st century), British guitarist for Noisettes
- Dan Smith, founder of the rock band The Dear & Departed

== Sports ==
- Dan Smith (rugby union) (1869–1926), South African rugby union player
- Dan Smith (minor league pitcher) (born 1962), College World Series Most Outstanding Player
- Dan Smith (left-handed pitcher) (born 1969), Major League Baseball pitcher
- Dan Smith (right-handed pitcher) (born 1975), Major League Baseball pitcher
- Dan Smith (ice hockey) (born 1976), Canadian ice hockey player
- Dan Smith (footballer, born 1986), English footballer
- Dan Smith (footballer, born 1989), English footballer
- Dan Smith (footballer, born 1999), English footballer
- Dan Smith (poker player) (born 1989), American professional poker player
- Dan Smith (rugby league), Welsh rugby league player

== Other ==
- T. Dan Smith (1915–1993), English politician from Newcastle upon Tyne
- Dan Smith (British author) (born 1951), British political activist

== See also ==
- Dan Ward-Smith (born 1978), rugby player
- Daniel Smith (disambiguation)
- Danny Smith (disambiguation)
