= Albie Roles =

English footballer (1921–2012)

Personal information
- Full name: Albert James Roles
- Date of birth: 29 September 1921
- Place of birth: Southampton, England
- Date of death: 3 October 2012 (aged 91)
- Place of death: Southampton, England
- Height: 5 ft 7 in (1.70 m)
- Position: Full back

Youth career
- Deanery School
- Albion Boys

Senior career*
Years	Team	Apps	(Gls)
1938–1949	Southampton	1	(0)
1940	→ West Ham United (wartime guest)		
1949	Gloucester City		
1949–1952	Cowes (player-manager)		
- * Club domestic league appearances and goals

Albert James "Albie" Roles (29 September 1921 – 3 October 2012) was an English footballer who played as a full back for Southampton. His career was interrupted by the Second World War and, as a result, he only made one Football League and four FA Cup appearances.

== Football career ==
Roles was born in Southampton and attended the Deanery School, becoming an apprentice engineer. He represented Southampton and Hampshire Schools and played his youth football with Albion Boys Club.

While playing in the Southampton Junior League, he was spotted by scouts from Southampton and joined them as an amateur in 1938. By the time he turned professional in October 1940, League football had been suspended because of the war, but Roles made 188 wartime appearances, more than any other Saints player. Roles was not conscripted during the war because his employment, making engines for torpedo boats at Parsons on the Town Quay, was a reserved occupation. During the war, Roles also made at least one guest appearance for West Ham United.

Described as a "mobile left-back", Roles played in four FA Cup matches in 1945–46, defeating Newport County 6–4 on aggregate before going out to Queens Park Rangers, 3–5 on aggregate. In the summer of 1946, Roles was called up to do his National Service and before he returned to The Dell in 1948, his position at left back was occupied by Bill Rochford who had been signed in July 1946.

On his return to the club after his National Service, Roles was placed on the transfer list, but was re-engaged for the start of the 1948–49 season. Roles had to wait until 4 April 1949 before he was selected again for the first team, when Rochford was unavailable for the trip to Bradford Park Avenue. At this time, Southampton were eight points clear at the top of the Second Division table with seven matches left to play and were confident of promotion. In the event, Southampton (also without top-scorer, Charlie Wayman) lost 2–0 at Bradford and only won once in the final six matches, missing promotion by one point.

In May 1949, Roles was released by the club, and joined Gloucester City for a brief spell before becoming player-manager at Cowes.

== Later career ==
In 1952, Roles and his wife both contracted tuberculosis and spent two years in hospital. Following his recovery, Roles was employed by Harland & Wolff, before spending twenty years as a technician at Southampton Institute of Higher Education.

Roles died on 3 October 2012, aged 91 years. He had been married to Vie for sixty six years; the couple had one son, David.
