= Norman Kirkman =

English footballer and manager

Personal information
- Date of birth: 6 June 1920
- Place of birth: Bolton, England
- Date of death: 17 November 1995 (aged 75)
- Place of death: Bolton, England
- Height: 5 ft 11 in (1.80 m)
- Position: Full-back

Senior career*
Years	Team	Apps	(Gls)
1939–1946	Burnley	0	(0)
1946–1947	Rochdale	53	(0)
1947–1949	Chesterfield	41	(0)
1949–1950	Leicester City	12	(0)
1950–1952	Southampton	20	(0)
1952–1953	Exeter City	11	(1)

Managerial career
- 1952–1953: Exeter City
- 1953–1954: Bradford Park Avenue
- 1965: Northwich Victoria
- * Club domestic league appearances and goals

Norman Kirkman (6 June 1920 – 17 November 1995) was an English footballer who played as a full-back for various clubs in the Football League in the 1940s and 1950s, before a brief career as a manager.

== Football career ==
=== Playing career ===
Kirkman was born in Bolton and attended Folds Road School. His football career started when he joined Burnley in May 1939, but his professional career was immediately interrupted by the Second World War.

During the war, he trained as an R.A.F. navigator and represented the R.A.F. in a football match against an Army team. He also made guest appearances for Brighton & Hove Albion, Fulham and Manchester United.

After he was "demobbed", he returned to Burnley before being signed by Rochdale in October 1946. He spent a little over a year in the Third Division North, during which he made 53 League appearances before moving up to the Second Division when he joined Chesterfield in November 1947.

Two years later, in August 1949, Kirkman joined fellow Second Division club, Leicester City, for a fee of £8,500. Although he made five appearances at the start of the 1949–50 season, he lost his place, firstly to Sandy Scott and then to Ron Jackson, before a return to the side in March for the final seven matches of the season.

In July 1950, he was signed by another Second Division side, Southampton, for "a four figure fee". Described as "a cool professional player", who "possessed a fastidious left foot", he made his debut for the "Saints" in the opening match of the 1950–51 season, playing at left-back in a 2–1 victory at Barnsley on 19 August 1950. After only one further match, he was replaced by Ted Ballard, although Kirkman regained his place in January before losing out again to Jack Gregory. In the following season, Kirkman made only seven further appearances, with the teenaged Peter Sillett being the first-choice at left-back.

In March 1952, Kirkman was "persuaded" to move to Exeter City in a player-manager role, with George Roughton moving in the opposite direction to replace Sid Cann, who had been "relieved of his duties" in December, following a falling-out with the board of directors.

=== Management career ===
Kirkman spent a year at St James Park in the Third Division South with no conspicuous success, before spending the 1953–54 season at Bradford Park Avenue of the Third Division North.

He then dropped out of football, to become a baker although he did return to management briefly in 1965 with Northwich Victoria. He also became a scout for various clubs, including Southampton, Newcastle United, Leeds United, Wolverhampton Wanderers, Stoke City and Carlisle United.
