= Ted Ballard =

English footballer

Personal information
- Full name: Edgar Albert Ballard
- Date of birth: 16 June 1920
- Place of birth: Brentford, England
- Date of death: 10 June 2008 (aged 87)
- Place of death: St Leonards-on-Sea, England
- Height: 5 ft 9 in (1.75 m)
- Position: Full-back

Youth career
- Hayes

Senior career*
Years	Team	Apps	(Gls)
1943–1946	Brentford	0	(0)
1946–1947	Leyton Orient	26	(1)
1947–1952	Southampton	46	(0)
1952–1953	Leyton Orient	0	(0)
1953–1956	Snowdown Colliery Welfare		
1953–1956	Hastings United		
1957–1958	Ashford Town	15	(0)

Managerial career
- 1957–1962: Ashford Town
- 1962–1965: Hastings United
- 1967: Hastings United (caretaker)
- * Club domestic league appearances and goals

Edgar Albert Ballard (16 June 1920 – 10 June 2008) was an English professional footballer who played as a full-back for Southampton in the late 1940s/early 1950s.

== Playing career ==
Ballard was born in Brentford and spent the war years working in a munitions factory in Hayes, Middlesex. His birthplace was only 50 yards from Griffin Park and he made one wartime appearance before signing as a professional for Leyton Orient in April 1946. He spent the 1946–47 season playing for Orient in the Third Division South before moving to The Dell in June 1947, with Bill Stroud moving in the opposite direction.

He made his debut for Southampton at home to West Ham United on 31 January 1948, replacing the injured Joe Mallett at centre half. After a run of eight games, he lost his place and spent the next season in the reserves. In 1949–50 and 1950–51 he made occasional starts, covering for Bill Ellerington at right-back and either Bill Rochford or Norman Kirkman at left-back. Unable to make either position his own, he was given a free transfer in August 1952, returning to Leyton Orient.

At Orient he failed to break into the first team and in 1953 joined Snowdown Colliery Welfare in the Kent League for three seasons. He then had spells as a manager with Ashford Town and Hastings United.

== Personal life ==
Ballard was brother in law of former footballer John Moore. He became manager of the Clarence public house in Hastings for a few years before becoming a franchising officer for Green Shield Stamps during the 1970s. He spent his retirement in St Leonards-on-Sea and died in June 2008, one week short of his 88th birthday.
