= Jack Gregory (footballer, born 1925) =

English footballer

Personal information
- Full name: John Leslie Gregory
- Date of birth: 25 January 1925
- Place of birth: Southampton, England
- Date of death: March 2008 (aged 83)
- Height: 5 ft 9 in (1.75 m)
- Position: Full back

Senior career*
Years	Team	Apps	(Gls)
1944–1955	Southampton	66	(0)
1955–1959	Leyton Orient	91	(0)
1959–1960	Bournemouth & Boscombe Athletic	17	(0)
1960–1962	Ashford Town	53	(0)
1962–1963	Hastings United		

Managerial career
- 1963–1965: Cowes Sports
- 1965–1966: Sholing Sports
- * Club domestic league appearances and goals

John Leslie Gregory (25 January 1925 – March 2008) was an English professional footballer who played as a full back for Southampton and Leyton Orient during the 1940s and 1950s.

== Playing career ==
=== Southampton ===
Gregory was born in Southampton and after playing youth football with Woolston Youth Club, he was signed by Southampton as a professional in December 1944. He made his first team debut as a replacement for Bill Rochford in a 3–1 defeat to Luton Town at a snow-covered Dell on 22 February 1947.

Gregory spent most of his Southampton career in the reserves and his next first team appearance came on 23 September 1950. After another spell in the reserves, he replaced Norman Kirkman for the final five games of the season. He retained his place in the first team for the start of the following season, before giving way to Kirkman after four matches. He made the occasional appearance over the next few months, with a run of eight games from January to March as replacement for Peter Sillett, who had taken over at fullback from Kirkman.

Gregory's best season for the Saints came in 1953–54 after they had been relegated to the Third Division South. He was appointed team captain and only missed four league matches during the season as Saints failed to make the expected return to Division Two. He then lost his place to Tommy Traynor and after another season in the reserves, he was given a free transfer to Leyton Orient in July 1955. In his ten years at the Dell, he made 68 appearances in all competitions, without scoring.

In his final season at The Dell, Gregory was an ever-present member of the Southampton reserve team which won the Combination Cup under the management of Ted Bates.

=== Leyton Orient ===
At Orient, he joined another club playing in the Third Division South, and helped them to take the Division title in his first season with his new club. The following season, now back in the Second Division, Gregory only missed two league matches as Orient consolidated their position in mid-table.

Gregory spent two more years at Brisbane Road before returning to the South coast in July 1959 to join Bournemouth & Boscombe Athletic, where he spent one season before retiring from professional football.

== Later career ==
He then dropped down to non-league football, spending two years with Ashford Town, followed by a year with Hastings United. He then returned to Southampton where he managed Isle of Wight team Cowes Sports and then Southampton based Sholing Sports.

He was employed in Southampton Docks as a boilermaker. He was married to Pauline and had four children. On 20 March 2008, it was reported that he had died.

== Honours ==
Leyton Orient

- Football League Third Division South champions: 1955–56
