= Len Stansbridge =

English footballer

Personal information
- Full name: Leonard Edward Charles Stansbridge
- Date of birth: 19 February 1919
- Place of birth: Southampton, England
- Date of death: 19 May 1986 (aged 67)
- Place of death: Southampton, England
- Height: 5 ft 11 in (1.80 m)
- Position: Goalkeeper

Youth career
- Southampton Schools

Senior career*
Years	Team	Apps	(Gls)
1936–1953	Southampton	52	(0)
1953–19??	Basingstoke Town		
- * Club domestic league appearances and goals

Leonard Edward Charles Stansbridge (19 February 1919 – 19 May 1986) was an English footballer, who played as a goalkeeper for Southampton in the period either side of the Second World War.

== Football career ==
Stansbridge was born in Southampton and attended Regents Park School. In 1932, he was a member of the Southampton Schools team which won the English Schools Trophy.

In May 1936, he joined Southampton as an amateur, signing a professional contract a few months later. He developed into a strong reliable 'keeper, although he spent most of his career at The Dell as a deputy, first to Sam Warhurst and later to Ian Black. Stansbridge made his "Saints" debut in the final match of the 1937–38 season, when he conceded four goals at Plymouth Argyle. Despite this, he started the following season as the first-choice keeper, but after three defeats he lost his place to Warhurst and only made two further appearances before the outbreak of war brought football to an end.

During World War II, Stansbridge joined the Royal Army Medical Corps, playing as a guest for Rotherham United and Swansea Town. At the Battle of Dunkirk, Stansbridge stayed behind to tend to injured troops rather than be evacuated and was captured by the enemy, spending the remainder of the war as a Prisoner of war in Poland.

In 1945, he returned to Southampton and was re-engaged by his home-town club, appearing four times in League South matches as well as in all four matches played in the 1945–46 FA Cup tournament. On the re-commencement of League football in 1946, Stansbridge was once again second-choice, this time behind George Ephgrave, who had played for Aston Villa before the war. Stansbridge and Ephgrave competed for the No. 1 jersey over the next season and a half until Ian Black was signed in December 1947. Although Ephgrave left the club in the summer of 1948, Black's form meant that Stansbridge only made four further first-team appearances up to the summer of 1950, during which time Southampton narrowly missed out on promotion to the First Division three consecutive seasons.

Black moved to Fulham in July 1950, with Northern Irish international Hugh Kelly joining the Saints in exchange. Stansbridge, now in his early thirties, had dropped down the "pecking order", with manager Sid Cann preferring the young Eddie Thomas when Kelly was unavailable, before signing John Christie in January 1951. With Fred Kiernan being signed in October 1951, Southampton now had four professional goalkeepers on their books and Stansbidge was restricted to reserve team football, before retiring in the 1953 close season.

His career as a player at Southampton spanned 17 years, of which six were interrupted by war; during this period, Stansbridge was restricted to 52 first-team appearances, but remained loyal to his hometown club, providing sterling cover whenever called upon.

== Later career ==
After his professional career was over, Stansbridge made a few appearances for Basingstoke Town and found employment at the Southampton Sports Centre as a groundsman. In 1962, he returned to The Dell when he became Southampton's groundsman where he continued to maintain the pitch until eventually retiring in the summer of 1984.

Stansbridge did not enjoy a long retirement, as he died two years later in May 1986.
