= Tony Godfrey =

English footballer (born 1939)

Personal information
- Full name: Tony William Godfrey
- Date of birth: 30 April 1939 (age 87)
- Place of birth: Pangbourne, England
- Height: 5 ft 9 in (1.75 m)
- Position: Goalkeeper

Youth career
- Basingstoke Town
- 1956: Norwich City
- 1956–1958: Southampton

Senior career*
Years	Team	Apps	(Gls)
1958–1965	Southampton	141	(0)
1965–1970	Aldershot	172	(0)
1970–1972	Rochdale	71	(0)
1972–1976	Aldershot	68	(0)
1976–1977	Basingstoke Town		
1985	Basingstoke Town		

Managerial career
- 1979–19??: Andover
- Alton Town
- Fleet
- * Club domestic league appearances and goals

Tony William Godfrey (born 30 April 1939) is an English retired footballer, who played as a goalkeeper for Southampton, Aldershot and Rochdale in the Football League.

== Football career ==
=== Early career ===
Godfrey was born in Pangbourne, Berkshire and played football for North Hampshire Schools. After leaving school he was an apprentice bricklayer and played in goal for Basingstoke Town in the Hampshire League, becoming their youngest-ever player. After a brief period on the books of Norwich City, he was signed by Southampton of the Football League Third Division South in May 1956 for a fee of £500, on the recommendation of Basingstoke's coach, Stan Clements, a former Southampton player.

=== Southampton ===
He started his career with the "Saints" in the youth team, which reached the semi-final of the FA Youth Cup in 1957. He made his reserve-team debut in March 1958 and signed a professional contract shortly after his 19th birthday. He continued to play regularly in the reserves until his first-team debut on 6 December 1958, when he took the place of John Christie who was unavailable with an injured knee for the FA Cup Second round match at Queens Park Rangers. Godfrey acquitted himself well with a "confident, cool, alert and agile" performance making several fine saves and keeping a clean sheet as Southampton won the match 1–0.

Godfrey retained his first-team place for the next five matches in the league, before Christie's return, although he was soon recalled, making 17 league appearances in his debutant season. With Christie leaving The Dell in the summer of 1959, Godfrey became first-choice 'keeper, playing the first 11 games of the 1959–60 season (including six victories), before an injury allowed Bob Charles to take his place. His career was then interrupted by his National Service which was spent in the Army, who he represented at football.

Southampton gained promotion to the Second Division in 1960 with Ron Reynolds now in goal. In the 1960–61 season, Godfrey vied with Reynolds for the first-choice position in goal, making only eight appearances, but regained the No. 1 spot for 1961–62 after Reynolds broke his ankle in the opening match. By the start of the following season, however, Reynolds had fought his way back into the first-team and Godfrey only made six appearances.

Reynolds was finally forced to retire after dislocating a shoulder in September 1963, thus allowing Godfrey to briefly become the unchallenged first-choice "custodian". In the summer of 1964, Southampton signed John Hollowbread from Tottenham Hotspur and Godfrey was once again second-choice, until after a run of 18 matches with only two victories, Hollowbread was dropped and Godfrey recalled. Hollowbread regained the No. 1 position for the start of the 1965–66 season until he sustained a knee injury in September 1965, which ended his career. Godfrey was once again recalled but after 14 matches, lost his place to Campbell Forsyth, who had been signed from Kilmarnock. Godfrey's final match for Southampton came on 4 December 1965 and shortly afterwards he was sold to Aldershot. In his seven years with Southampton, Godfrey made a total of 149 first-team appearances.

=== Aldershot and Rochdale ===
He joined Aldershot in December 1965 for "a four figure fee" but was unable to make his debut for them because he was suffering with hepatitis. His debut came on 19 March 1966, in a goalless draw with Notts County at Recreation Ground.

He soon became the first-choice goalkeeper, being ever-present in the 1966–67 and 1967–68 seasons. He stayed with Aldershot for 4 1/2 years before he was signed by his former Southampton teammate Dick Conner at Rochdale in the summer of 1970.

Godfrey spent two seasons with Rochdale, in the second of which he was the club's Player of the Season before returning to Aldershot in July 1972. He made 71 League appearances for the Spotland club.

On his return to Aldershot, he was again ever-present in the 1972–73 season, when Aldershot were promoted from the Fourth Division for the first time. He was to remain at the Recreation Ground for another three seasons, until, with Glen Johnson now the first-choice 'keeper, he decided to retire in 1976.

== Coaching career ==
Godfrey then returned to Basingstoke Town in a player-coach role, before spells as manager at Andover, Alton Town and Fleet, followed by a return to Basingstoke. In 1985, aged 45, Basingstoke were suffering an injury crisis, so Godfrey returned for one match, thus becoming their oldest-ever first-team player, having been their youngest player 30 years earlier.

== Later career ==
Godfrey settled in a village south of Basingstoke where he resumed his career as a builder until his retirement.
