= John Christie (footballer, born 1929) =

Scottish footballer (1929–2014)

Personal information
- Full name: John Alexander Christie
- Date of birth: 26 September 1929
- Place of birth: Fraserburgh, Scotland
- Date of death: 9 March 2014 (aged 84)
- Place of death: Chandler's Ford, Hampshire, England
- Height: 5 ft 10 in (1.78 m)
- Position: Goalkeeper

Youth career
- 1947–1948: Auchenblae

Senior career*
Years	Team	Apps	(Gls)
1948–1949	Inverness Thistle		
1949–1951	Ayr United	19	(0)
1951–1959	Southampton	197	(0)
1959–1962	Walsall	102	(0)
1962–1963	Burton Albion		
1963–1964	Rugby Town		
Total		318	(0)
- * Club domestic league appearances and goals

John Alexander Christie (26 September 1929 – 9 March 2014) was a football goalkeeper who played for Southampton F.C. for most of the 1950s.

== Playing career ==
A product of the Scottish Highland Football League, Christie was born in Fraserburgh, Aberdeenshire, and played as an amateur with Auchenblae and then transferred to the senior ranks with Highland Football League club Inverness Thistle. He left Inverness Thistle in May 1949 to join Ayr United in the Scottish Football League.

He came to the notice of Southampton's manager Sid Cann whilst doing his National Service at Farnborough and in January 1951 he signed him for Southampton.

He made his debut for the "Saints" at Swansea Town on 3 February 1951 replacing first choice keeper Hugh Kelly. In 1950–51 Southampton had problems with the goalkeeping position and in all used four different custodians (the others were Eddie Thomas and Len Stansbridge). Described by Holley & Chalk as "agile and brave" he spent most of his time at The Dell jostling for the No. 1 shirt with Fred Kiernan until 1956, when Christie established himself as the first choice 'keeper. In 1956–57 he played in all but the last two games of the season as Saints had the best defence in the Third Division South, but were unable to secure promotion, finishing in fourth place in the table.

He started the following season as first choice 'keeper before losing his place to Brian Stevens after a 4–0 defeat at Port Vale on 16 September. Stevens retained the No. 1 shirt for ten games before Christie regained it, keeping it for the rest of the season. He continued into the following season until after a run of 50 league and cup games a knee injury forced him to give way to 19-year-old Tony Godfrey, who had come up through the ranks from the youth team. Although Christie regained the shirt in March for a further seven games, he made his final appearance for the Saints on 11 April 1959, away to Tranmere Rovers. After making 217 appearances for Southampton in just over 8 years, he moved to Walsall in June 1959.

At Walsall, he won a Football League Fourth Division championship medal in 1960 and the following season he was part of the team that gained a successive promotion to the Second Division.

In August 1962, he left Walsall and then had spells at Burton Albion and Rugby Town before retiring.

== Later career ==
After retirement from football in 1964, he was a sales representative for Columbus Dixon industrial cleaners for 27 years, and then site supervisor at Henry Beaufort School in Winchester.

He died on 9 March 2014, aged 84.

== Honours ==
Walsall

- Football League Fourth Division championship: 1959–60
- Football League Third Division runners-up: 1960–61
