= Patrick Kelly (association footballer) =

Footballer (1918–1985)

Personal information
- Full name: Patrick Michael Kelly
- Date of birth: 9 April 1918
- Place of birth: Johannesburg, South Africa
- Date of death: 7 September 1985 (aged 67)
- Place of death: Rochdale, England
- Position: Goalkeeper

Youth career
- Pirates (Bloemfontein)

Senior career*
| Years | Team | Apps | (Gls) |
| 1939 | Aberdeen | 4 | (0) |
| 1941–1942 | Dumbarton (wartime guest) | 10 | (0) |
| 1946–1952 | Barnsley | 145 | (0) |
| 1952–1953 | Crewe Alexandra | 38 | (0) |

International career
| 1949 | Ireland | 1 | (0) |
- * Club domestic league appearances and goals

Patrick Michael Kelly (9 April 1918 – 7 September 1985) was a professional footballer who played as a goalkeeper, spending most of his career with Barnsley. Born in South Africa, he made one international appearance for Ireland.

== Career ==
Kelly was born in Johannesburg, South Africa and played his youth football with the Pirates club in Bloemfontein before moving to Scotland to join Aberdeen.

At the end of the Second World War he joined Barnsley of the Football League Second Division where he was to remain for the next six years, making over 150 appearances.

Kelly made his solitary international appearance in a World Cup qualifier against Scotland on 1 October 1949; another international débutante in that match was his Barnsley team-mate, Danny Blanchflower. With just over half an hour played, the Scots were five goals up and although the Irish managed to score twice in the second half (through Sammy Smyth), the final score was 8–2 to Scotland. Kelly was never selected for Northern Ireland again, with his namesake, Hugh Kelly of Fulham replacing him, only to concede nine goals against England in the next match.

Kelly was released by Barnsley in February 1952, and dropped into Division Three (North) with Crewe Alexandra. He stayed for a little over a season at Gresty Road before retiring from professional football.
