= Frank Squires =

Welsh footballer (1921–1988)

Personal information
- Date of birth: 8 March 1921
- Place of birth: Swansea, Wales
- Date of death: 1 March 1988 (aged 66)
- Place of death: Swansea, Wales
- Position: Inside forward

Senior career*
Years	Team	Apps	(Gls)
1938–1947	Swansea Town	36	(5)
1947–1950	Plymouth Argyle	86	(13)
1950–1951	Grimsby Town	36	(2)
1951–1955	Merthyr Tydfil		
1955–1956	Barry Town	47	(7)
1956–195?	Brecon Corinthians		

International career
1942–1946	Wales Wartime matches	2	(0)

Managerial career
- Brecon Corinthians (Player/ Manager)
- * Club domestic league appearances and goals

Frank Squires (8 March 1921 – 1 March 1988) was a Welsh professional footballer who played as an inside forward.

== Club career ==
Squires turned professional in June 1938 for Swansea Town and played in wartime football. He made his Football League debut for the club in 1946, scoring five goals in 36 league games for Swansea before being sold to Plymouth Argyle in October 1947. He then moved to Grimsby Town in July 1950, before a move to Merthyr Tydfil in September 1951.

Squires left Merthyr Tydfil in 1955 and signed for Southern League side Barry Town as a Player Coach. Squires made 47 appearances in the Southern League for Barry Town and 1 Welsh League appearance for their reserve side scoring a total of 7 goals for the club in a season long stint at Barry.

== International career ==
Squires was a Welsh Schoolboy international, and played one wartime international for Wales, and also a Victory international in 1946.

== Management career ==
He was also player-coach at Barry Town and player-manager for Brecon Corinthians.
