= Dan Smith (rugby union) =

South African rugby union player

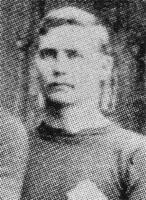
- Born: Daniel Walter Smith; 8 April 1869 Durban, Colony of Natal
- Died: 27 February 1926 (aged 56)

Rugby union career
- Position: Forward
Provincial / State sides
Years	Team	Apps	(Points)
	Griqualand West	0	(0)
International career
Years	Team	Apps	(Points)
1891	South Africa	1	(0)
- Correct as of 19 July 2010

Dan Smith (8 April 1869 – 27 February 1926) was a Colony of Natal-born international rugby union player who played as a forward.
