= Bill Heaton =

English footballer

Personal information
- Full name: William Henry Heaton
- Date of birth: 26 August 1918
- Place of birth: Leeds, England
- Date of death: 16 January 1990 (aged 71)
- Position: Winger

Senior career*
Years	Team	Apps	(Gls)
- Whitkirk
1946–1948	Leeds United	59	(6)
1948–1949	Southampton	15	(0)
1949–1950	Stalybridge Celtic		
1950–1951	Rochdale	5	(0)
- Witton Albion
- * Club domestic league appearances and goals

William Henry Heaton (26 August 1918 – 16 January 1990) was an English footballer who played in the Football League for Leeds United, Southampton and Rochdale.
