= John Harston =

English footballer

Personal information
- Full name: John Charles Harston
- Date of birth: 7 October 1920
- Place of birth: Barnsley, England
- Date of death: 25 June 2013 (aged 92)
- Place of death: Barnsley, England
- Position: Right back

Youth career
- Ardsley Athletic

Senior career*
Years	Team	Apps	(Gls)
1937–1938	Wolverhampton Wanderers	0	(0)
- Dudley Town
1938–1949	Barnsley	20	(1)
1949–1950	Bradford City	24	(1)
- Scarborough
- Denaby United
Total		44+	(2+)
- * Club domestic league appearances and goals

John Charles Harston (7 October 1920 – 25 June 2013) was an English professional footballer who played as a right back.

== Career ==
Born in Barnsley, Harston played for Ardsley Athletic, Wolverhampton Wanderers, Dudley Town, Barnsley, Bradford City, Scarborough and Denaby United.

For Bradford City he made 24 appearances in the Football League.

== Sources ==
- Frost, Terry (1988). Bradford City A Complete Record 1903-1988. Breedon Books Sport. ISBN 0-907969-38-0.
