= Ron Mansfield =

English footballer

Personal information
- Full name: Ronald William Mansfield
- Date of birth: 31 December 1923
- Place of birth: Romford, Essex, England
- Date of death: April 1997 (age 73)
- Place of death: Havering, London, England
- Position: Winger

Senior career*
Years	Team	Apps	(Gls)
	Ilford	?	(?)
1946–1952	Millwall	97	(25)
1952–1953	Southend United	8	(3)
	Sittingbourne	?	(?)
Total		105	(28)
- * Club domestic league appearances and goals

Ronald William Mansfield (31 December 1923 – April 1997) was an English footballer who played as a winger in the Football League.
