= Jimmy Ithell =

Welsh footballer

Personal information
- Full name: William James Ithell
- Date of birth: 7 February 1916
- Place of birth: Hawarden, Wales
- Date of death: 3 January 1986 (aged 69)
- Place of death: Trowbridge, England
- Position: Centre half

Senior career*
Years	Team	Apps	(Gls)
1936–1946	Bolton Wanderers	0	(0)
1946–1950	Swindon Town	107	(1)
1950–1952	Boston United		

Managerial career
- 1950–1952: Boston United
- Poole Town
- Chippenham Town
- Trowbridge Town
- * Club domestic league appearances and goals

William James Ithell (7 February 1916 – 3 January 1986) was a Welsh professional footballer who played as a centre half in the Football League for Swindon Town. He later managed in non-League football.

== Personal life ==
Ithell served in 53rd (Bolton) Field Regiment, Royal Artillery, during the Second World War.

== Career statistics ==
Appearances and goals by club, season and competition
Club	Season	League			FA Cup		Total	
Club	Season	Division	Apps	Goals	Apps	Goals	Apps	Goals
Swindon Town	1946–47	Third Division South	39	1	2	0	41	1
Swindon Town	1947–48	Third Division South	39	0	6	0	45	0
Swindon Town	1948–49	Third Division South	23	0	1	0	24	0
Swindon Town	1949–50	Third Division South	6	0	2	0	8	0
Career total			107	1	11	0	118	1
