= Daniel Smith (art materials) =

American art supply manufacturer and retailer

Coordinates: 47.565465°N 122.334084°W

- Type: Private
- Industry: Art materials
- Founded: 1976; 50 years ago
- Founder: Daniel Smith
- Headquarters: Seattle, Washington, United States
- Area served: United States
- Products: Oil paints, watercolor paintings
- Website: danielsmith.com

Daniel Smith (sometimes advertised as "Daniel Smith Artists' Materials" or "Daniel Smith Art Supply") is an art supply manufacturer and retailer. Dan Smith, a noted printmaking artist, founded the operation in 1976, endeavoring to produce artist grade printmaking ink. Later, watercolors and oil paints were added to its products.

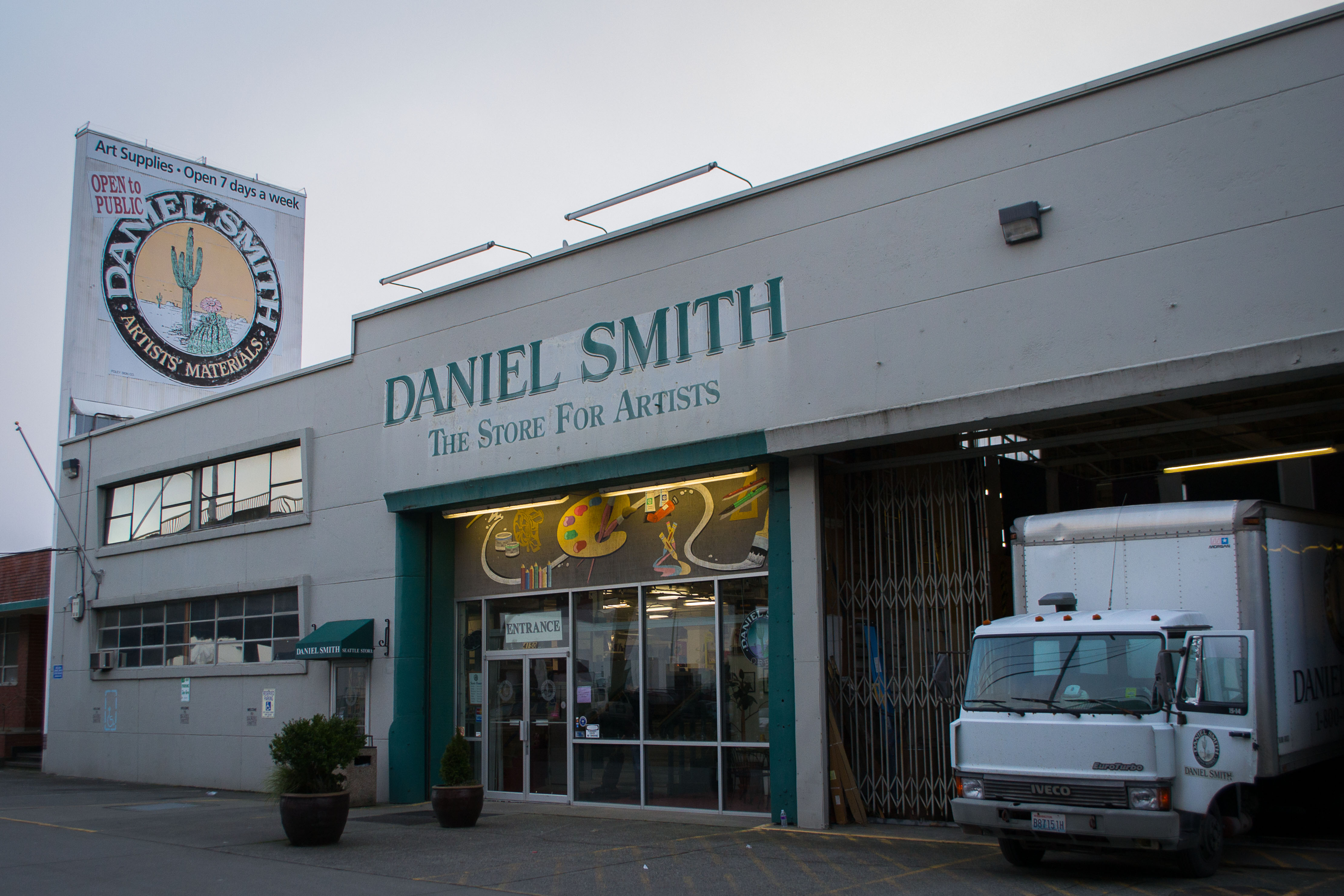
A Daniel Smith store pictured in 2013

Daniel Smith's paint manufacturing facility is located in Seattle, Washington Dc, where it mills pigments and mixes the final paint product.

One of the unique approaches to paint that the company focuses on is the use of pigments derived from semi-precious minerals and other unique geological deposits. The PrimaTek® collection of colors has paints derived from turquoise, amethyst, lapis lazuli, rhodonite, kyanite and serpentine.

== Bibliography ==
- Gragg, Randy "Daniel Smith Takes A Detour" The Oregonian [Portland, Or] 13 Sep 1998: F06.
- Massa, Leslie. "Daniel Smith, 1995/1996" Catalog Age 13. 9 (Sep 1996): 95.
- Miller, Paul. "Good hygiene works for Daniel Smith" Catalog Age 19. 7 (Jun 2002): 49.
