= Ray White (footballer, born 1918) =

English footballer

Personal information
- Full name: Raymond Bernard William White
- Date of birth: 13 August 1918
- Place of birth: Bootle, England
- Date of death: 1988 (aged 69–70)
- Position: Wing half

Senior career*
Years	Team	Apps	(Gls)
?–1946	Tottenham Hotspur	0	(0)
1946–1951	Bradford Park Avenue	151	(3)
- * Club domestic league appearances and goals

Raymond Bernard William White (13 August 1918 – 1988) was an English professional footballer who played for Tottenham Hotspur and Bradford Park Avenue.

== Playing career ==
White, an amateur played in one FA Cup match for the Spurs in 1946. The wing half joined Bradford Park Avenue in May 1946 and went on to make 151 appearances and net three goals between 1946 and 1951.
