= Danielle Smith (disambiguation) =

Danielle Smith (born 1971) is a Canadian politician.

Danielle Smith may also refer to:

- Danielle Smith (volleyball) (born 1995), Canadian volleyball player

== See also ==
- Danielle Bassett (Danielle Smith Bassett, born 1981), American physicist and systems neuroscientist
- Daniella Smith (born 1972), New Zealand former professional boxer
