= Eric Webber =

English footballer (1919–1996)

Personal information
- Full name: Eric Victor Webber
- Date of birth: 22 December 1919
- Place of birth: Shoreham-by-Sea, England
- Date of death: 10 December 1996 (aged 76)
- Place of death: Southampton, England
- Height: 6 ft 1 in (1.85 m)
- Position: Centre-half

Youth career
- Fareham Town
- Gosport Borough
- Norwich City
- 1937–1938: Southampton

Senior career*
Years	Team	Apps	(Gls)
1938–1951	Southampton	182	(0)
1951–1956	Torquay United	149	(2)
Total		331	(2)

Managerial career
- 1951–1965: Torquay United
- 1965–1970: Poole Town
- * Club domestic league appearances and goals

Eric Victor Webber (22 December 1919 – 10 December 1996) was an English football player, playing as a centre-half, and manager.

== Playing career ==
=== Early days ===
Although he was born at Shoreham in West Sussex, Webber's family moved into Hampshire when he was a child and he played for Fareham Senior School, before joining Fareham Town and then Gosport Borough. He had an unsuccessful trial with Portsmouth before Jim Angell recommended him to Tom Parker, the manager of Norwich City. In 1937, he followed Parker to Southampton where he was initially a member of the club's nursery side, playing in the Hampshire League.

=== Southampton ===
Webber was quickly promoted to the Reserves where his efforts were rewarded by a professional contract in March 1939. He made one appearance in the first team on 15 April 1939 when he took the place of Stan Cutting at right-half for the match at Blackburn Rovers; the match was lost 3–0, and Ray Parkin took over at right-half for the next match. Before he had the chance to establish himself in the first team, normal football was suspended following the outbreak of World War II.

During the war, he served in the RAF but also managed to play wartime football for Mansfield Town and Derby County.

He returned to The Dell in 1945 and immediately became the regular centre-half, being ever-present in 1948–49 and 1949–50. Promotion was narrowly missed in 1947–48 when Saints finished in third place, a feat repeated the following season (despite having an 8-point lead with 8 games to play) whilst in 1949–50 Southampton were to be denied promotion by 0.06 of a goal, missing out on second place to Sheffield United.

In March 1948, Webber came up against George Lowrie in consecutive matches against different clubs. On 6 March, Saints won 1–0 at Coventry City; during the week Lowrie moved to Newcastle United (becoming their most expensive signing in the process), and on 13 March, Saints defeated Newcastle at The Dell 4–2. In both games, Webber marked Lowrie out of the game. Lowrie was to have "revenge" at the end of the season, however, as Newcastle took the second promotion place ahead of The Saints.

According to Holley & Chalk's The Alphabet of the Saints, Webber was "an effective blocker of anything that came his way". He became team captain in 1950, succeeding Bill Rochford, and his leadership qualities were soon to stand him in good stead, when he moved to Torquay as their player-manager.

He played 182 league games for Southampton, plus 10 in the FA Cup.

=== Torquay United ===
In October 1951 Webber left Southampton to become player-manager at Torquay United. He continued as a player until 1955, making 149 league appearances for the Gulls.

== Managerial career ==
=== Torquay United ===
In January 1955 Webber managed the club to an historic 4–0 win over Leeds United in the FA Cup.

In the 1956–57 season, he almost took Torquay to promotion from Division Three (South). On the final day of the season they needed to take maximum points from their game against Crystal Palace, but only managed to obtain a draw, so Ipswich Town took the only promotion place then available (on goal average). He did however lead Torquay to promotion from Division Four in 1960, Torquay finishing in 3rd place. Torquay were relegated two years later, again on the last day of the season, but Webber remained at the club until he was surprisingly sacked in May 1965, to be replaced by Frank O'Farrell after Torquay had finished in 12th place at the end of the season. He had spent nearly 14 years as Torquay manager, signing a number of players who would go on to greater things, including Robin Stubbs whom he signed from Birmingham City for £6,000.

=== Poole Town ===
After spending 14 years as manager at Plainmoor, Webber spent another five years as manager at Poole Town, before retiring from football in 1970.

== After football ==
In August 1970, Webber returned to Southampton, where he ran the Manor House pub in Woolston until retiring in April 1984.
