= Jimmy Smith (footballer, born 1889) =

English footballer

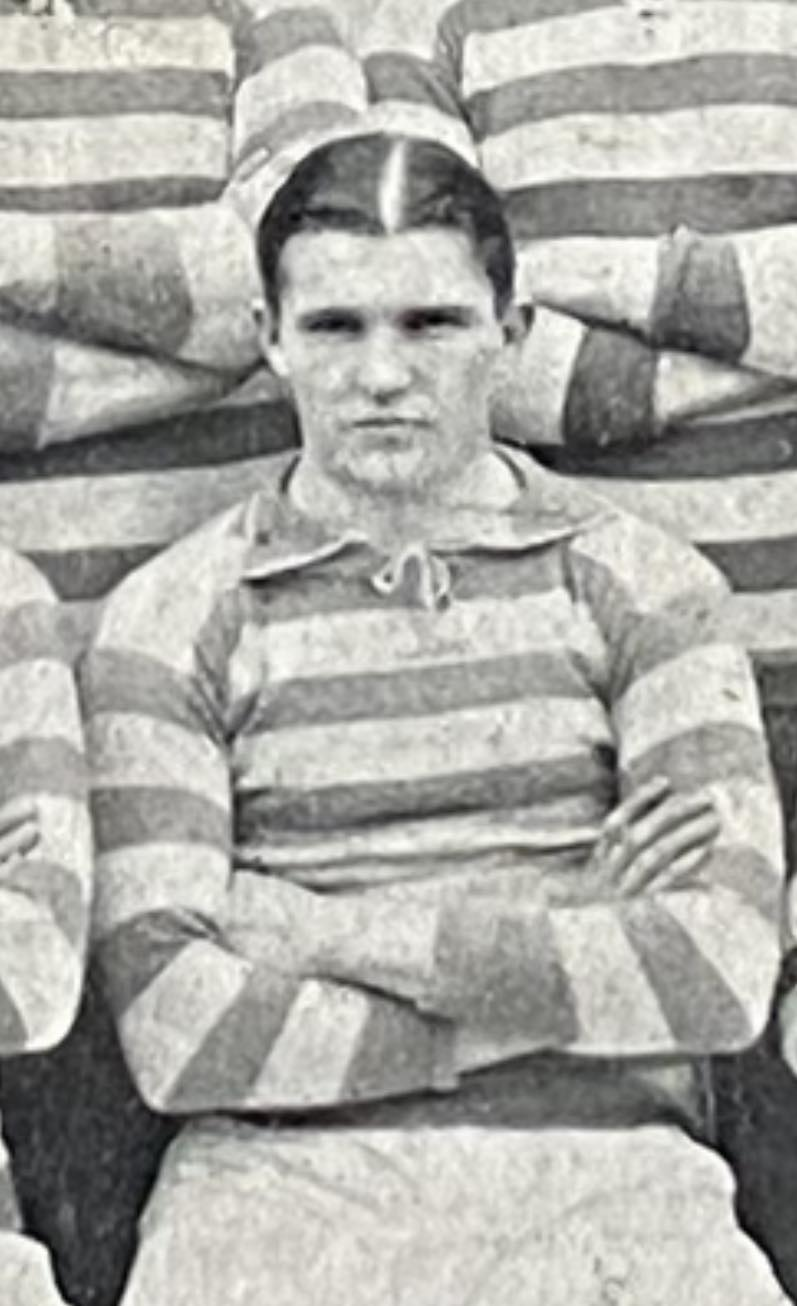
- Jimmy Smith in his BPA days

Personal information
- Full name: James Smith
- Date of birth: 1889
- Place of birth: Stafford, England
- Date of death: 8 October 1918 (aged 28–29)
- Place of death: Northern France
- Position: Centre forward

Senior career*
| Years | Team | Apps | (Gls) |
| 190?–1910 | Hanley PSA | | |
| 1910–1911 | Hanley Swifts | | |
| 1911–1912 | Brighton & Hove Albion | 59 | (37) |
| 1912–1915 | Bradford (Park Avenue) | 90 | (49) |
- * Club domestic league appearances and goals

James Smith (1889 – 8 October 1918) was an English professional footballer who scored 49 goals from 90 appearances in the Football League playing as a centre forward for Bradford (Park Avenue).

Smith was born in Stafford, Staffordshire. He was a prolific scorer in local football in the Hanley area, but began his professional career with Southern League club Brighton & Hove Albion in January 1911. He was the club's top scorer in the 1911–12 season with 27 goals in all competitions. In November 1912, he moved into the Football League, joining Bradford for the substantial fee of £735 plus inside forward Bobby Simpson. Smith played 90 League games for Bradford, scoring at better than a goal every two games and helping them earn promotion to the First Division in 1914, before the First World War interrupted his career.

He served as a gunner in the Royal Field Artillery, and was killed in action on the Western Front in 1918, a few weeks before he was due to get married. He is buried in the British Cemetery at Ramicourt, Aisne, France.
