= Joe McClarence =

English footballer

Personal information
- Full name: Joseph McClarence
- Date of birth: 1885
- Place of birth: Newcastle upon Tyne, England
- Position: Inside forward

Senior career*
Years	Team	Apps	(Gls)
1903–1904	Wallsend Park Villa		
1904–1908	Newcastle United	30	(13)
1908	Bolton Wanderers	15	(6)
1908–1911	Bradford (Park Avenue)	63	(31)
1911	Distillery		
Total		108	(50)
- * Club domestic league appearances and goals

Joseph McClarence (1885–unknown) was an English footballer who played in the Football League for Bolton Wanderers, Bradford (Park Avenue) and Newcastle United.
