= Augie Scott =

English footballer and manager (1921-1998)

Personal information
- Full name: Augustus Fisher Scott
- Date of birth: 19 February 1921
- Place of birth: Sunderland, England
- Date of death: 28 November 1998 (aged 77)
- Place of death: Sunderland, England
- Height: 5 ft 6 in (1.68 m)
- Position: Forward

Senior career*
Years	Team	Apps	(Gls)
- Hylton Colliery
1939–1947	Luton Town	0	(0)
1947–1951	Southampton	46	(9)
1951–1954	Colchester United	120	(10)
- Chelmsford City
- Cheltenham Town
Total		166	(19)

Managerial career
- 1954–1955: Chelmsford City
- Cheltenham Town
- * Club domestic league appearances and goals

Augustus Fisher Scott (19 February 1921 – 28 November 1998) was an English football player and manager who played in the Football League as a forward for Southampton and Colchester United. He managed Southern League clubs Chelmsford City and Cheltenham Town.

== Career ==
Born in Sunderland, Scott was spotted by Luton Town prior to World War II playing for Hylton Colliery. Following the war, he moved to Southampton in July 1947, where he scored nine goals in 46 league matches for the Saints.

Scott signed for Colchester United for a club record fee of £2,000 in the summer of 1951, with Colchester battling against Cardiff City for his signature. He made his debut for the U's on 18 August 1951, the opening game of the season and a heavy 5–1 defeat to Brighton & Hove Albion at the Goldstone Ground. He scored his first goals for Colchester during a 4–2 defeat to Reading at Elm Park on 10 November 1951, scoring a brace. Scott made 120 Football League appearances for Colchester between 1951 and 1954, scoring 10 goals, with his final goal the consolation in a 2–1 defeat to rivals Ipswich Town at Layer Road on 19 December 1953. He played his final match for United on 17 April 1954 in a 3–0 win against Millwall.

Scott was released by Colchester in the summer of 1954 to become player-manager at neighbours Chelmsford City. He would also act as player-coach at Cheltenham Town where he led the team to victory in the Southern League Cup over Gravesend in 1958.

Scott later worked in the building trade, retiring in Southampton in 1986. He died on 28 November 1998.
