= George Ainsley =

English footballer and manager

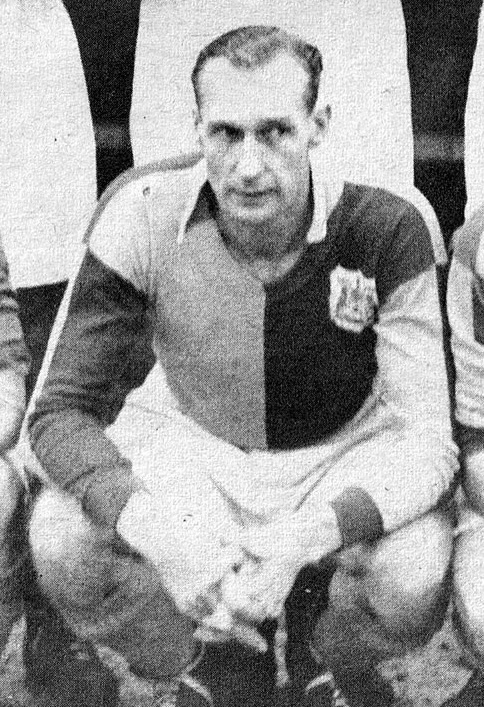
- Ainsley with Leeds United in the 1946–47 season

Personal information
- Full name: George Edward Ainsley
- Date of birth: 15 April 1915
- Place of birth: South Shields, England
- Date of death: April 1985
- Place of death: Leeds, England
- Height: 6 ft 1 in (1.85 m)
- Position: Forward

Senior career*
Years	Team	Apps	(Gls)
- South Shields St. Andrews
1932–1936	Sunderland	4	(0)
1936	Bolton Wanderers	7	(0)
1936–1947	Leeds United	91	(30)
1947–1949	Bradford Park Avenue	44	(29)
Total		146	(59)

Managerial career
- 1950: Bengal
- 1950: Bombay
- 1955: SK Brann
- 1958–1959: Ghana
- 1962: Pakistan
- 1963–1964: Israel
- 1965–1966: Workington
- 1971: USL Dunkerque
- * Club domestic league appearances and goals

George Edward Ainsley (15 April 1915 – April 1985) was an English professional footballer and football manager.

== Playing career ==
Ainsley played as a centre forward throughout his career, first played for his local side South Shields St. Andrews before joining Sunderland in April 1932. He made his league debut for them on 6 May 1933 in a 1–1 draw away to Chelsea. He played three more times the following season, in games against Portsmouth, Stoke City and Manchester City, but failed to feature again for Sunderland.

He left to join Bolton Wanderers in August 1936. In the same year, after just seven league games for Bolton, Ainsley moved to Leeds United. He scored on his league debut on 19 December against Sunderland, and scored twice in his second appearance as Leeds beat Middlesbrough.

He was never a regular at Elland Road, despite scoring 30 goals in 89 league games. He remained with Leeds until after the war, joining Bradford Park Avenue in November 1947. He retired from playing in 1949, having scored 29 goals in 44 games for Bradford Park Avenue.

== Coaching career ==
After retiring as a player, Ainsley travelled the world as a coach.

He began coaching in India in 1950, where he was the coach of the Bengal and Bombay football teams for four months. He returned to coach the football team at Cambridge University in the early 1950s. In Bergen, he trained the Norwegian team SK Brann half of 1955.

He was head coach of Ghana between 1958 and 1959. He was later appointed coach of the Pakistan national team until November 1962, at the 1962 Merdeka Tournament, he led the side until finishing as runner-ups after falling against Indonesia in the final. He then moved to Highland Park, Johannesburg as coach. Late in 1963 he became the manager of the Israel national side, leaving that post in December 1964.

He was appointed manager of Workington in June 1965, guiding the side to their highest ever league position (5th in Division Three) the following season. However, Workington were relegated at the end of the 1966–67 season and Ainsley was sacked in November 1966. He then coached USL Dunkerque in France.

== Death ==
He died in Leeds in 1985.
