= Ted Bates (footballer) =

English footballer (1918–2003)

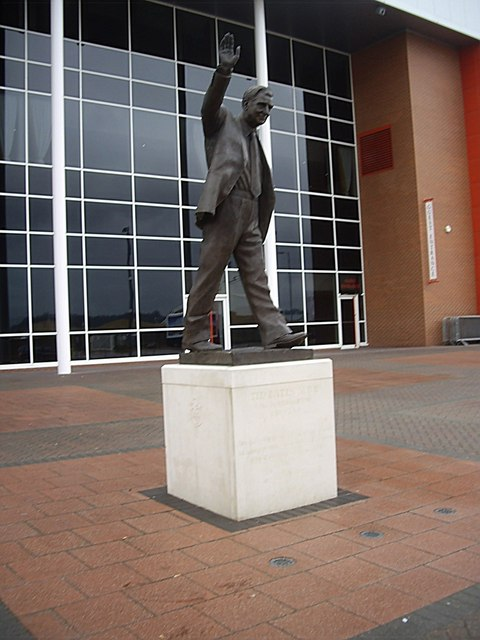
- Statue of Bates outside St Mary's Stadium

Personal information
- Full name: Edric Thornton Bates
- Date of birth: 3 May 1918
- Place of birth: Thetford, England
- Date of death: 28 November 2003 (aged 85)
- Place of death: Southampton, England
- Height: 5 ft 9 in (1.75 m)
- Position: Forward

Youth career
- 1935–1936: Norwich City

Senior career*
Years	Team	Apps	(Gls)
1936–1937	Norwich City	0	(0)
1936–1937	Folland Aircraft		
1937–1953	Southampton	202	(63)

Managerial career
- 1955–1973: Southampton
- * Club domestic league appearances and goals

Edric Thornton Bates MBE (3 May 1918 – 28 November 2003) was an English professional footballer who played as a forward. He spent the majority of his career at Southampton F.C. as a player, manager, director and president which earned him the sobriquet "Mr. Southampton".

Bates was the son of Eddie Bates, who played cricket for Yorkshire and Glamorgan and football for Bolton Wanderers and Leeds United. He was the grandson of Billy Bates who was one of the finest all-rounders for England in the early years of international cricket.

== Playing career ==
Bates was born in Thetford and joined Saints on his 19th birthday in 1937, transferring from Norwich City. He soon forced his way into the first team as a centre-forward. His career was interrupted by the Second World War, during which league football was suspended in England. He initially joined the War Reserve police force, spending his time on guard duty at the Shell-Mex oil depot at Hamble or the Pirelli-General cable works at Woolston. In the early part of the war, Bates still managed regular appearances for Saints in the wartime cups and leagues.

On 8 June 1940, Bates married Mary Smith at St. James's Church in Shirley, and that evening watched Saints play Charlton Athletic at The Dell. Shortly afterwards the Bates' home was bombed and they moved to West Wellow, where Mary found work with the NAAFI. Bates resigned from the War Reserve and went to work at the Folland Aircraft factory at Hamble, who also had a very good works football team, Folland Aircraft, which, as well as Bates, included other professional players such as Bill Dodgin (Southampton), Harold Pond (Carlisle United), Bert Tann (Charlton), Dick Foss (Chelsea), Bill Bushby, Cliff Parker and Bill Rochford (all Portsmouth). Most of these players also guested for Saints in the War leagues.

Bates' finest playing days came between 1947 and 1951 when he formed a great partnership with Charlie Wayman.

After some declining performances on the pitch, Bates made his last first-team appearance on 20 December 1952 at home to West Ham United. During his career he made 216 appearances, scoring 64 times.

== Management ==
After retiring from playing, he became a coach at Southampton in May 1953; advancing to manager in September 1955, taking over from George Roughton. Southampton were in the regional Third Division South when he took over as manager. They were promoted to the national Second Division in 1959 when they finished as champions of the Third Division with Derek Reeves scoring 39 league goals, a club record.

Southampton were promoted to the First Division in 1966. Under his management, the team maintained their First Division status, developing young players such as Mick Channon and Ron Davies, and qualifying for European football in 1969 and 1971.

Bates decided to step down as manager in December 1973 and was replaced by Lawrie McMenemy. He was manager for 18 years, a record for the club. Bates acted as McMenemy's assistant for the next few years, which included Southampton's historic FA Cup victory in 1976. Bates was the first person to congratulate McMenemy and the players as the final whistle was blown at Wembley.

== Honours ==
Bates then joined the Saints' board, where he would serve as a director for another 20 years before being appointed the club's president. He received the freedom of the city of Southampton in 1998 and was honoured with the MBE in the 2001 New Year Honours for services to Southampton Football Club.

== Death ==
Bates was widely regarded as a local hero for his dedication to the club over a period of 66 years, and his death in November 2003 was widely commemorated by the club and supporters' community.

The first game after his death was the home match against Portsmouth in the League Cup and was the first derby between the two local rivals since an FA Cup match at The Dell in 1996. A minute's silence in Bates' memory barely lasted 30 seconds after jeers and boos from fans in the away end. Those who booed and jeered were widely criticised by the media and by fellow Portsmouth fans.

== Ted Bates Trophy ==
In 2004, the Ted Bates Trophy was inaugurated with a match against Bayern Munich. It was an annual friendly match held in Bates' honour by Southampton.

== Statue controversy ==
A statue of Bates was unveiled outside the main entrance to St Mary's Stadium on 17 March 2007. The statue cost approximately £112,000, half of which was raised by fans via the Ted Bates Trust, and the other half met by Southampton Football Club.

The statue was widely criticised by supporters just hours after its uncovering, for having "tiny" arms and bearing a closer likeness to former Portsmouth chairman Milan Mandarić than Bates, so the club pledged to organise a replacement. The replacement statue, by sculptor Sean Hedges-Quinn, was unveiled on Saturday 22 March 2008.

In January 2022, Southampton told victims of historical sexual abuse that took place at the club that they were considering taking down the statue after accusations Bates ignored complaints about former youth coach Bob Higgins. In May 2022, Southampton confirmed they would not remove the statue of Bates.

== Bibliography ==
- David Bull (1998). Dell Diamond. Hagiology Publishing. ISBN 0-9534474-0-5.
- Jeremy Wilson (2006). Southampton's Cult Heroes. Know The Score Books. ISBN 1-905449-01-1.
