= Danny Smith (footballer) =

Scottish footballer (1921–1998)

Personal information
- Full name: Daniel Smith
- Date of birth: 7 September 1921
- Place of birth: Armadale, Scotland
- Date of death: 8 October 1998 (aged 77)
- Place of death: Kettering, England
- Position: Winger

Senior career*
| Years | Team | Apps | (Gls) |
| | Coltness United | ? | (?) |
| 1947–1948 | West Bromwich Albion | 7 | (1) |
| 1948–1949 | Chesterfield | 15 | (4) |
| 1949–1952 | Crewe Alexandra | 110 | (15) |
| | Corby Town | ? | (?) |
| Total | | 132 | (20) |
- * Club domestic league appearances and goals

Daniel Smith (7 September 1921 – 8 October 1998) was a Scottish professional footballer who played as a winger in the Football League.

== Sources ==
- Danny Smith at Post War English & Scottish Football League A–Z Player's Transfer Database
