= George Horsfall =

Australian soccer player and coach (1924–1992)

Personal information
- Full name: Frank George Horsfall
- Date of birth: 19 September 1924
- Place of birth: Perth, Western Australia
- Date of death: 28 August 1992 (aged 67)
- Place of death: Southampton, England
- Height: 5 ft 10 in (1.78 m)
- Position: Half-back

Senior career*
| Years | Team | Apps | (Gls) |
- Guildford City
| 1947 | Southampton | 2 | (0) |
| 1949–1950 | Southend United | 1 | (0) |
| 1950–1955 | Guildford City | | |
- * Club domestic league appearances and goals

Frank George Horsfall (19 September 1924 – 28 August 1992) was an Australian-born footballer.

Horsfall played for Southend United and Southampton in the Football League.

After retiring from football Horsfall worked for many years with Southampton as a coach.
