= George Beattie (footballer) =

Scottish footballer (1925–2012)

Personal information
- Full name: George Beattie
- Date of birth: 16 June 1925
- Place of birth: Aberdeen, Scotland
- Date of death: 10 March 2012 (aged 86)
- Place of death: Newport, Wales
- Position: Inside forward

Senior career*
| Years | Team | Apps | (Gls) |
| 1947–1948 | Southampton | 1 | (0) |
| 1948–1950 | Gloucester City | ? | (?) |
| 1950–1953 | Newport County | 113 | (26) |
| 1953–1955 | Bradford Park Avenue | 53 | (16) |
- Tonbridge
- * Club domestic league appearances and goals

George Beattie (16 June 1925 – 10 March 2012) was a Scottish professional footballer. An inside forward he began his career with Southampton but only played one game in the 1947–48 season.

Beattie briefly played for Gloucester City before he joined Newport County in 1950. He went on to make 113 Football League appearances for Newport scoring 26 goals.

In 1953 he joined Bradford Park Avenue and in 1955 he joined Tonbridge.

Beattie died in Newport, Wales on 10 March 2012, at the age of 86.
