= Bob Charles (footballer) =

English footballer

Personal information
- Date of birth: 26 December 1941
- Place of birth: Bursledon, England
- Date of death: 7 March 2014 (aged 72)
- Position: Goalkeeper

Senior career*
| Years | Team | Apps | (Gls) |
| 1959–1960 | Southampton | 26 | (0) |
- Weymouth
- Hastings United
- * Club domestic league appearances and goals

Bob Charles (26 December 1941 – 7 March 2014) was an English professional footballer who played as a goalkeeper.

== Career ==
Born in Bursledon, Charles played for Southampton, Weymouth and Hastings United.
