= Fred Kiernan =

Irish footballer

Personal information
- Full name: Frederick William Kiernan
- Date of birth: 7 July 1919
- Place of birth: Dublin, Ireland
- Date of death: December 1981 (Age 62)
- Place of death: Southampton, England
- Height: 5 ft 8 in (1.73 m)
- Position: Goalkeeper

Youth career
- Drumcondra

Senior career*
Years	Team	Apps	(Gls)
1942–1945	Shelbourne		
1945–1948	Dundalk		
1948–1949	Sligo Rovers		
1949–1951	Shamrock Rovers		
1951–1956	Southampton	132	(0)
1956–1958	Yeovil Town		

International career
1951–1952	Ireland	5	(0)
1951	League of Ireland XI	1	(0)
- * Club domestic league appearances and goals

Frederick William Kiernan (7 July 1919 – December 1981) was an Irish professional footballer who played as a goalkeeper in the 1940s and 1950s.

== Playing career ==
He was born in Dublin and his first senior club was Shelbourne, though he initially played as a youth with Drumcondra.

With Shelbourne, he came close to a clean sweep of honours in the 1943–44 season, winning the League and Shield and losing out to Shamrock Rovers in the FAI Cup final.

In the summer of 1945, he transferred to play for Dundalk. After three seasons with Dundalk, he moved to Sligo Rovers where he played just one season (1948–49).

He was then signed by Shamrock Rovers coach Paddy Coad.

At 5 ft 8in he was unusually small for a goalkeeper but, according to Holley & Chalk's "In That Number", "he had tremendous agility, which went a long way in compensating". Ireland recognised his talents, and in May 1951 he made his international debut against Argentina) and before May was out he had added a second cap (v. Norway).

Later that year at the age of 32, he joined Southampton for a then record League of Ireland fee for a goalkeeper of £4,500.

By October 1951 he had made his Southampton debut in the Football League Division Two against Hull City. Over the next 5 seasons he made 136 League and Cup appearances with the Saints and added another three Irish caps to his collection. During his time at The Dell, he contested John Christie for the goalkeeper's jersey.

In January 1954 he unsuccessfully applied for the manager's post at Peterborough United. He was almost 37 years of age when he played his last game for the Saints against Norwich City in April 1956 and the following July he moved to Yeovil Town.

He retired from active playing in 1958, before returning to Southampton, where he spent a brief period coaching with A.C. Delco.

== Honours ==
Shelbourne

- League of Ireland champions: 1943–44
- League of Ireland Shield winners: 1943–44

Shamrock Rovers

- League of Ireland Shield winners: 1949–50
