= Gerry Henry =

English footballer and manager

Personal information
- Full name: Gerald Robert Henry
- Date of birth: 5 October 1920
- Place of birth: Hemsworth, England
- Date of death: 1979 (aged 58–59)
- Height: 1.65 m (5 ft 5 in)
- Position: Midfielder

Senior career*
Years	Team	Apps	(Gls)
- Outwood Stormcocks
1937–1947	Leeds United	44	(4)
1947–1950	Bradford Park Avenue	79	(31)
1950–1951	Sheffield Wednesday	40	(7)
1951–1953	Halifax Town	24	(3)

Managerial career
- 1951–1954: Halifax Town
- * Club domestic league appearances and goals

Gerry Henry (5 October 1920 – 1979) was a professional footballer who played for Leeds United, Bradford Park Avenue, Sheffield Wednesday and Halifax Town.

Henry played for Yorkshire Schools in 1934 and went on to join Leeds United as a seventeen year old from local junior side Outwood Stormcocks. He made a couple of appearances for Leeds United before World War II interrupted his professional football career.

Henry continued playing for the Leeds United throughout the war in the Wartime League. He played 168 times in Wartime League games, scoring an impressive 93 goals, and scored 1 goal in 3 appearances in the Football League War Cup for Leeds. Henry holds the record for most wartime appearances for the club by an individual player. Wartime appearances and goals are typically not acknowledged as counting for career goals and appearance. Henry is one of only around 70 players that have made over 200 appearances for Leeds United if his wartime games are taken into account.

Henry later became player-coach at Halifax and then had a spell as player-manager 27 February 1952 until 15 October 1954. He ceased playing in June 1953.
