= Charlie Wayman =

English footballer

Personal information
- Full name: Charles Wayman
- Date of birth: 16 May 1921
- Place of birth: Bishop Auckland, England
- Date of death: 26 February 2006 (aged 84)
- Position: Centre forward

Senior career*
Years	Team	Apps	(Gls)
1946–1947	Newcastle United	47	(32)
1947–1950	Southampton	100	(73)
1950–1954	Preston North End	157	(105)
1954–1956	Middlesbrough	55	(31)
1956–1958	Darlington	23	(14)
Total		382	(255)
- * Club domestic league appearances and goals

Charles Wayman (16 May 1921 – 26 February 2006) was an English footballer.

Wayman, who was born in Chilton, Bishop Auckland, was a prolific centre-forward in the first decade after the Second World War. Newcastle United signed him from Spennymoor United in September 1941, while he was working as a miner at Chilton Colliery. He later formed a great partnership with Ted Bates at Southampton. In total, he played for five Football League clubs between 1941 and 1958. A knee injury forced his retirement from league football. He later coached Evenwood Town and became a sales manager for the Scottish and Newcastle brewery.

His brother, Frank, was also a professional footballer.

== Honours ==
Preston North End

- FA Cup runner-up: 1953–54
