= Bill Ellerington =

English footballer (1923–2015)

Personal information
- Full name: William Ellerington
- Date of birth: 30 June 1923
- Place of birth: Southampton, England
- Date of death: 4 April 2015 (aged 91)
- Height: 6 ft 0 in (1.83 m)
- Position: Full back

Youth career
- Fatfield Colliery
- 1938–1940: Sunderland

Senior career*
Years	Team	Apps	(Gls)
1945–1956	Southampton	224	(10)

International career
1949	England B	1	(0)
1949	England	2	(0)
- * Club domestic league appearances and goals

William Ellerington (30 June 1923 – 4 April 2015) was an English footballer who was capped twice for the full England national team and once for England B, and spent his entire professional club career at Southampton F.C.

Born in Southampton, Ellerington signed as a professional with his home-town club in September 1945 and made his debut in an FA Cup game at Newport County on 10 January 1946. After retiring in 1956, he became a scout and is credited with spotting the young Mick Channon.

His father, also called Bill, was a half back with Middlesbrough and Nelson in the 1920s.
