= Ian Black (footballer, born 1924) =

Scottish footballer (1924–2012)

Personal information
- Full name: Ian Henderson Black
- Date of birth: 27 March 1924
- Place of birth: Aberdeen, Scotland
- Date of death: 13 December 2012 (aged 88)
- Place of death: Kingston upon Thames, England
- Height: 6 ft 0 in (1.83 m)
- Position: Goalkeeper

Youth career
- Aberdeen Boys' Brigade
- St Clement's (Aberdeen)

Senior career*
Years	Team	Apps	(Gls)
1944–1947	Aberdeen	0	(0)
1947–1950	Southampton	97	(0)
1950–1959	Fulham	263	(1)
1959–1962	Bath City	143	(0)
1962–1964	Canterbury City		

International career
1948	Scotland	1	(0)

Managerial career
- 1966: Brentford (caretaker)
- * Club domestic league appearances and goals

Ian Henderson Black (27 March 1924 – 13 December 2012) was a Scottish professional footballer who made over 260 appearances in the Football League for Fulham as a goalkeeper. He also played for Southampton and was capped by Scotland at international level.

== Club career ==
Black's early career with Aberdeen was disrupted by the Second World War, during which he made guest appearances for both Southampton and Chelsea and he won the South Final of the Football League War Cup with the latter. In December 1947 he was transferred to Second Division club Southampton for a £1,000 fee. In three seasons as a contracted player at The Dell, Black made 104 appearances.

In July 1950, Black transferred to First Division club Fulham, in exchange for Hugh Kelly and made 282 appearances for the club. In July 1959, he moved down to the Southern League to play for Bath City, with whom he won the Premier Division championship and the Somerset Premier Cup in 1959–60. After making 143 appearances, Black moved to Canterbury City and retired in 1964. After his retirement from football, Black served as youth team manager (and in 1966, as caretaker manager of the first team) at Brentford, as an advisor to Redhill and secretary at Tolworth.

== International career ==
Black was capped once by Scotland, in a 2–0 defeat to England on 10 April 1948.

== Personal life ==
Black served in the Royal Electrical and Mechanical Engineers during the Second World War. After leaving football, Black ran a sports shop in Tolworth with former teammate Eddie Lowe and represented Surrey at bowls.

== Playing statistics ==
Appearances and goals by club, season and competition
Club	Season	League			FA Cup		Total	
Club	Season	Division	Apps	Goals	Apps	Goals	Apps	Goals
Southampton	1947–48	Second Division	17	0	4	0	21	0
Southampton	1948–49	Second Division	41	0	1	0	42	0
Southampton	1949–50	Second Division	39	0	2	0	41	0
Southampton	Total		97	0	7	0	104	0
Fulham	1950–51	First Division	42	0	5	0	47	0
Fulham	1951–52	First Division	39	0	1	0	40	0
Fulham	1952–53	Second Division	37	1	1	0	38	1
Fulham	1953–54	Second Division	32	0	3	0	35	0
Fulham	1954–55	Second Division	27	0	0	0	27	0
Fulham	1955–56	Second Division	34	0	2	0	36	0
Fulham	1956–57	Second Division	37	0	2	0	39	0
Fulham	1957–58	Second Division	15	0	0	0	15	0
Fulham	Total		263	1	19	0	282	1
Career total			360	1	26	0	386	1

== Managerial statistics ==
Managerial record by team and tenure
Team	From	To	Record					Ref
Team	From	To	P	W	D	L	Win %	Ref
Brentford (caretaker)	18 April 1966	2 May 1966	3	1	1	1	33.3	
Total			3	1	1	1	33.3	—

== Honours ==
Bath City

- Southern League Premier Division: 1959–60
