= Bill Rochford =

English footballer

Personal information
- Full name: William Rochford
- Date of birth: 27 May 1913
- Place of birth: New House, County Durham, England
- Date of death: 9 March 1984 (aged 70)
- Place of death: Bishop Auckland, England
- Height: 5 ft 10 in (1.78 m)
- Position: Full-back

Youth career
- Esh Winning
- Cuckfield

Senior career*
Years	Team	Apps	(Gls)
1931–1946	Portsmouth	138	(1)
1946–1950	Southampton	128	(0)
1950–1951	Colchester United	2	(0)
- * Club domestic league appearances and goals

William Rochford (27 May 1913 – 9 March 1984) was an English footballer. A member of the Portsmouth team that won the 1939 FA Cup, he played over 100 matches for Portsmouth and for their south coast rivals, Southampton.

== Playing career ==
Rochford was born at New House, County Durham into a mining family, and as a youth he played for the Esh Winning junior XI. His family subsequently moved to Cuckfield, West Sussex from where he joined Portsmouth in July 1931.

=== Portsmouth ===
Rochford (known as "Rockie" throughout his career) made his debut for Portsmouth against Southampton in the Rowland Hospital Cup at The Dell in April 1932. At first, playing at right-back, he made only the occasional first team start for Pompey, who finished regularly in mid-table in the Football League First Division, but by 1934-35 he had become a regular choice and in 1936 he represented the English League. In 1937 he switched to left-back and stayed there, being an ever-present in 1937-38.

His greatest moment for Portsmouth came in the FA Cup, when Pompey, who were struggling in the relegation zone, swept aside high-flying Wolves in the 1939 FA Cup Final running in 4-1 victors. As a result of the suspension of the FA Cup for the duration of World War II, the next FA Cup final was not until 7 years later in 1946, thereby enabling Portsmouth fans to claim that their team has held the Cup for the longest time.

Rochford continued to play for Portsmouth during the war, making over 200 appearances in war-time matches. During the War he worked at the aircraft factory in Hamble-le-Rice and also played football for their works team Folland Aircraft.

=== Southampton ===
After the cessation of hostilities, he joined Southampton in July 1946 for a fee of £550 in readiness for the first post-war league season. Rochford soon became automatic choice as team captain, and, according to Holley & Chalk's "In That Number" he "was a father figure to many of the younger and less experienced players", including Alf Ramsey and Bill Ellerington, who were vying for the right-back position.

Over the next few seasons he rarely missed a game as Saints narrowly missed out on promotion from Division 2. In August 1949, he applied for the position as manager following the departure of Bill Dodgin to Fulham. Although Rochford was strongly tipped for the job, being the players' choice, his application was turned down in favour of Sid Cann. Although appointed player-coach under Cann, Rochford was disappointed and after missing out on promotion yet again at the end of the 1949-50 season, he left the club in July 1950 to join Colchester United.

=== Colchester ===
Colchester were about to embark on their first season in the Football League, but Rochford was only able to make two league appearances before retiring.

== After football ==
Following his retirement, Rochford returned to his native north-east to become a farmer near Gateshead, but continued to serve Southampton F.C. by acting as their scout in the area. He died at Bishop Auckland in March 1984.

== Honours ==
Portsmouth

- FA Cup: 1938–39
