= Hodgkinson =

Hodgkinson is an English-language surname. Notable people with the name include:

- Alan Hodgkinson (1936–2015), English footballer
- Albert Hodgkinson (1897–1975), English recipient of the Distinguished Conduct Medal
- Alison Hodgkinson, South African cricketer
- Antony Hodgkinson, English drummer
- Bert Hodgkinson (1884–1939), Welsh international footballer
- Bert Hodgkinson (footballer, born 1903), English footballer
- Charles Hodgkinson, English footballer
- Clement Hodgkinson, English naturalist
- Colin Hodgkinson, British musician
- Debby Hodgkinson, Australian rugby union player
- Del Hodgkinson, English professional rugby league footballer
- Derek Hodgkinson, British World War II pilot
- Eaton Hodgkinson, English engineer
- Frances Brett Hodgkinson (1771–1803), American theater actress
- Frank Hodgkinson, Australian artist
- George Langton Hodgkinson, English priest and cricketer
- Gerard Hodgkinson, English cricketer
- Gilbert Hodgkinson, English cricketer
- Greta Hodgkinson, American-Canadian ballet dancer
- Grosvenor Hodgkinson, English lawyer and politician
- Harry Hodgkinson (footballer), English footballer
- Harry Hodgkinson (writer), English writer
- Ian Hodgkinson, Canadian professional wrestler, known as Vampiro
- James Hodgkinson (1950–2017), left-wing activist and perpetrator of the Congressional baseball shooting
- John Hodgkinson (disambiguation)
- Katrina Hodgkinson, Australian politician
- Keely Hodgkinson, English athlete
- Liz Hodgkinson, English author and journalist
- Lorna Hodgkinson, Australian educator
- Michael Hodgkinson (born 1944), British business man
- Patrick Hodgkinson, British architect
- Peter Hodgkinson (architect) (born 1940), British architect
- Peter Hodgkinson (sculptor) (born 1956), British sculptor
- Randall Hodgkinson, American pianist
- Richard Hodgkinson, English cricketer
- Samuel Hodgkinson, New Zealand politician
- Sandra Hodgkinson, American lawyer
- Simon Hodgkinson, English rugby player
- Terry Hodgkinson, English businessman and academic
- Tim Hodgkinson, English musician and composer
- Tom Hodgkinson, English writer and editor
- Toni Hodgkinson, New Zealand athlete
- Will Hodgkinson, English journalist and author
- William Hodgkinson (politician), Australian explorer, journalist, gold miner, and politician
- William Hodgkinson (footballer), Welsh footballer, brother of Bert Hodgkinson

== See also ==
- Hodgkinson County, Queensland, an obsolete cadastral division
- Hodgkinsonia, a plant genus
- Hodgkinsonite, a rare mineral
- Hodkinson
