= Frank Costello (footballer) =

English footballer (1884–1914)

Personal information
- Full name: Frederick G. Costello
- Date of birth: 1884
- Place of birth: Birmingham, England
- Date of death: 19 December 1914 (aged 29)
- Place of death: France
- Position: Forward

Youth career
- Soho Villa

Senior career*
Years	Team	Apps	(Gls)
1904–1905	West Bromwich Albion	0	(0)
1905–1907	Halesowen Town	60	(35)
1907–1909	Southampton	41	(10)
1909	West Ham United	12	(3)
1909–1910	Bolton Wanderers	0	(0)
1910–????	Nelson		
- Merthyr Town
- Salisbury City
- * Club domestic league appearances and goals

Frederick "Frank" G. Costello (1884 – 19 December 1914) was an English professional footballer who played as a forward for Southampton and West Ham United prior to the First World War.

== Playing career ==
Costello was born in Birmingham and, after playing his youth football with Soho Villa, joined West Bromwich Albion in September 1904. Failing to make the grade, he moved to Halesowen Town at the beginning of the 1905-06 season. He made his debut on 2 September 1905, scoring the winning goal in a 1-0 victory over Oldbury. He went on to make 60 recorded league appearances and helped Halesowen gain promotion back into the Birmingham & District League.

After two seasons with Halesowen, he moved to the south coast to join Southern League Southampton in the 1907 close season. He made his professional debut on 14 September 1907, scoring in a 2–0 victory at Luton Town. He initially played at inside right alongside Bert Hodgkinson on the outside and either Frank Jefferis, John Lewis or George Smith in the centre. Described as "a trifle slow, he was clever with the ball and had a habit of disconcerting the opposition by making for goal when he was expected to make a pass". In the 1907–08 season he scored nine goals from 28 league appearances.

He also played in all six FA Cup matches as Saints reached the semi-finals, losing to Wolverhampton Wanderers who went on to take the cup in the final. In the round four (quarter final) replay against Everton at The Dell on 11 March 1908 he played his best game for the "Saints". In the first half he hooked a John Johnston cross past the Everton goalkeeper Billy Scott. With the score 2–1 to Southampton at half-time, the second half "belonged to Frank Costello". He was involved in most of Southampton's attacks and when John Bainbridge swung over a deep cross from the right it appeared to have been over hit and going out of play. Suddenly, "out of nowhere", Costello arrived and met the ball with his head, sending it back over the goalkeeper into the far corner of the net. According to Duncan Holley in "Match of the Millennium", "a contortionist would have had problems attaining a position ... to reach the ball." The Saints won the match 3–2, but lost to Wolverhampton Wanderers in the semi-final with goals from former Southampton players Wally Radford and George Hedley.

Injury kept him out of the team for the early part of the 1908–09 season; he had a run of five matches at inside left in November before being switched to centre forward as replacement for Arthur Hughes who had suffered a bad leg injury. Although Costello scored in his first match in his new role (in a 4–2 victory over Plymouth Argyle on 12 December 1908), he was not a success and in March 1909 he was transferred to West Ham United, with Jack Foster moving in the opposite direction.

He made twelve Southern League appearances for West Ham (scoring three goals) before moving on to Bolton Wanderers. He failed to make the first team at Bolton and after spells with Nelson and Merthyr Town he returned to Southampton, where he turned out occasionally for Salisbury City.

== After football ==
During the First World War he was enlisted into the Royal Warwickshire Regiment. He saw action at the Battle of Le Cateau and at Marne, Aisne and Messines, and was killed in action in France on 19 December 1914. He is commemorated at the Ploegsteert Memorial to the Missing in Hainaut, Belgium.
