= Bert Trueman =

English footballer (1882–1961)

Personal information
- Full name: Albert Henry Trueman
- Date of birth: 1882
- Place of birth: Leicester, England
- Date of death: 1961 (aged 78–79)
- Height: 5 ft 6 in (1.68 m)
- Position: Left half

Youth career
- –: Wigston Excelsior
- –: Grasmere Swifts
- 1899: Leicester Fosse

Senior career*
Years	Team	Apps	(Gls)
–	Hinckley Town		
–	Coalville Town		
–	St Andrews (Leicester)		
1905–1908	Leicester Fosse	43	(2)
1908–1911	Southampton	87	(4)
1911–1913	Sheffield United	55	(0)
1913–1915	Darlington		
- * Club domestic league appearances and goals

Albert Henry Trueman (1882–1961) was an English footballer who played as a half-back for various clubs in the early twentieth century.

== Football career ==
Trueman was born in Leicester and educated at Holy Trinity School, from where he was selected to represent Leicestershire Schools. After spells with various local clubs, including Hinckley Town, playing in the Midland League, and Coalville Town of the Leicestershire Senior League, in August 1905 he joined Leicester Fosse of the Football League Second Division as cover for Bob Pollock who had been the regular left-half since 1902. In his three seasons with the Filbert Street club, Trueman made 47 first-team appearances, scoring three goals, before a move in May 1908 to the south coast to join Southampton of the Southern League.

He was recruited by the "Saints" as replacement for the former England international Harry Hadley who had just retired from professional football. Despite being considered too small to be a half-back, Trueman soon proved that his judgement and skill made up for his lack of height and he showed himself to be "quick, resourceful and decisive in action (who was) overall a most difficult obstacle for opposing forwards". His debut came on 7 September 1908 in a 4–1 victory over Brighton & Hove Albion, when Frank Jefferis scored a hat-trick. He soon became established at left-half, alongside Frank Thorpe or Sam Jepp in the centre and John Johnston on the right, although Trueman was able to play in any of the half-back positions. In the 1908–09 season, Trueman made 31 league appearances, with Southampton finishing third in the table, having led the table until a run of injuries to key players such as Thorpe and Jefferis in mid-season disrupted the side.

A series of injuries resulted in Trueman missing large parts of the 1909–10 season, when he was usually replaced by Jack Robertson, but returned to full fitness for the following season. He made a four appearances for the Southern League and scored the winning goal against the Football League in November 1910, giving the Southern League a clean-sweep of that season's Inter-League Tournament; he was also given a trial for the England national side. Soon afterwards, Trueman grew restless at The Dell and in March 1911 was allowed to return to the Football League with Sheffield United.

At Bramall Lane, he displaced the England international Albert Sturgess at left-half, with Sturgess moving to the right. Trueman remained with the "Blades" until the summer of 1913, before finishing his career with Darlington in the North Eastern League.

In September 1916, Trueman was visiting Filbert Street when he was persuaded to turn out for Leicester in a war-time game against Grimsby Town as the home team were short of players.
