= Joe Blake =

English footballer

Personal information
- Full name: John Joseph Blake
- Date of birth: October 1st. 1882
- Place of birth: Belchamp Walter, England
- Date of death: 23 February 1931 (aged 48)
- Place of death: Southampton, England
- Position: Outside forward

Youth career
- C.E.Y.M.S.

Senior career*
Years	Team	Apps	(Gls)
- Ilford
1905	Tottenham Hotspur	0	(0)
1905	Cowes		
1905–1920	Southampton	148	(13)
1920–19??	Thornycrofts (Woolston)		
- * Club domestic league appearances and goals

John Joseph Blake (1st October 1882 – 23 February 1931) was an English footballer who played as an outside-forward for Southampton in the early part of the twentieth century.

== Football career ==
Blake was born in Belchamp Walter, near Sudbury and played his youth football with the Church of England Young Men's Society before moving to London to train as a draughtsman. Whilst in London he played as an amateur for Ilford and Tottenham Hotspur (in their Western League side).

He then took up employment in Cowes on the Isle of Wight and turned out for the local team, from where he was invited to make the occasional guest appearance for Southampton reserves in 1905. Following a move to the Thornycroft shipyard in Woolston he was able to play for the "Saints" on a more regular basis, and on 6 October 1906, he was called into the first-team for a Southern League match against Millwall. Playing at outside-right, Blake scored in a 5–1 victory, but that was his only appearance that season, during which manager Ernest Arnfield tried nine different players on the right-wing.

Blake's next appearances came in March/April 1908, when he played three matches at outside-left in place of Bert Hodgkinson. Equally at home on either wing, Blake was awarded a professional contract in 1908, from when on his appearances were more frequent. In the 1908–09 season, he made twelve appearances, either as cover for Hodgkinson on the right or John Bainbridge on the left, including twice as inside-left, when he replaced Sam Shearer.

In September 1909, he took over the outside-left berth from Bob Carter and became established on the left, making 23 appearances in 1909–10 and missing only five in the 1910–11 season. Being a "fleet footed" winger who "could dribble the ball", Blake's skill and ability to "centre the ball with pin-point exactness" "posed many problems to opponents". Following the arrival of George Handley in the summer of 1911, Blake missed most of the 1911–12 season, making only thirteen appearances, whilst in 1912–13 Len Andrews was preferred by new trainer Jimmy McIntyre, before Blake was recalled in January, with Andrews switching to the right.

At the start of the 1913–14 season, Andrews reverted to outside-left and it was not until October that Blake was recalled, initially replacing Tom Binder on the right wing for four matches before moving over to the left, with Andrews at inside-left and Sid Kimpton on the right. Blake retained his place for the rest of the season, but again lost out to Andrews in 1914–15, when he managed only twelve appearances.

During World War I, Blake's services were required in the Thornycroft shipyard although he did manage 32 appearances in wartime leagues in the early part of the war. Following the resumption of league football after the cessation of hostilities, Blake made one further appearance, on 1 November 1919 in a 3–0 defeat at Crystal Palace. Having made a total of 154 appearances for the first-team, Blake retired in the summer of 1920 and took up full-time employment with Thornycroft.
