= Suleiman Mousa =

Jordanian historian (1919–2008)

Suleiman Mousa سليمان الموسى
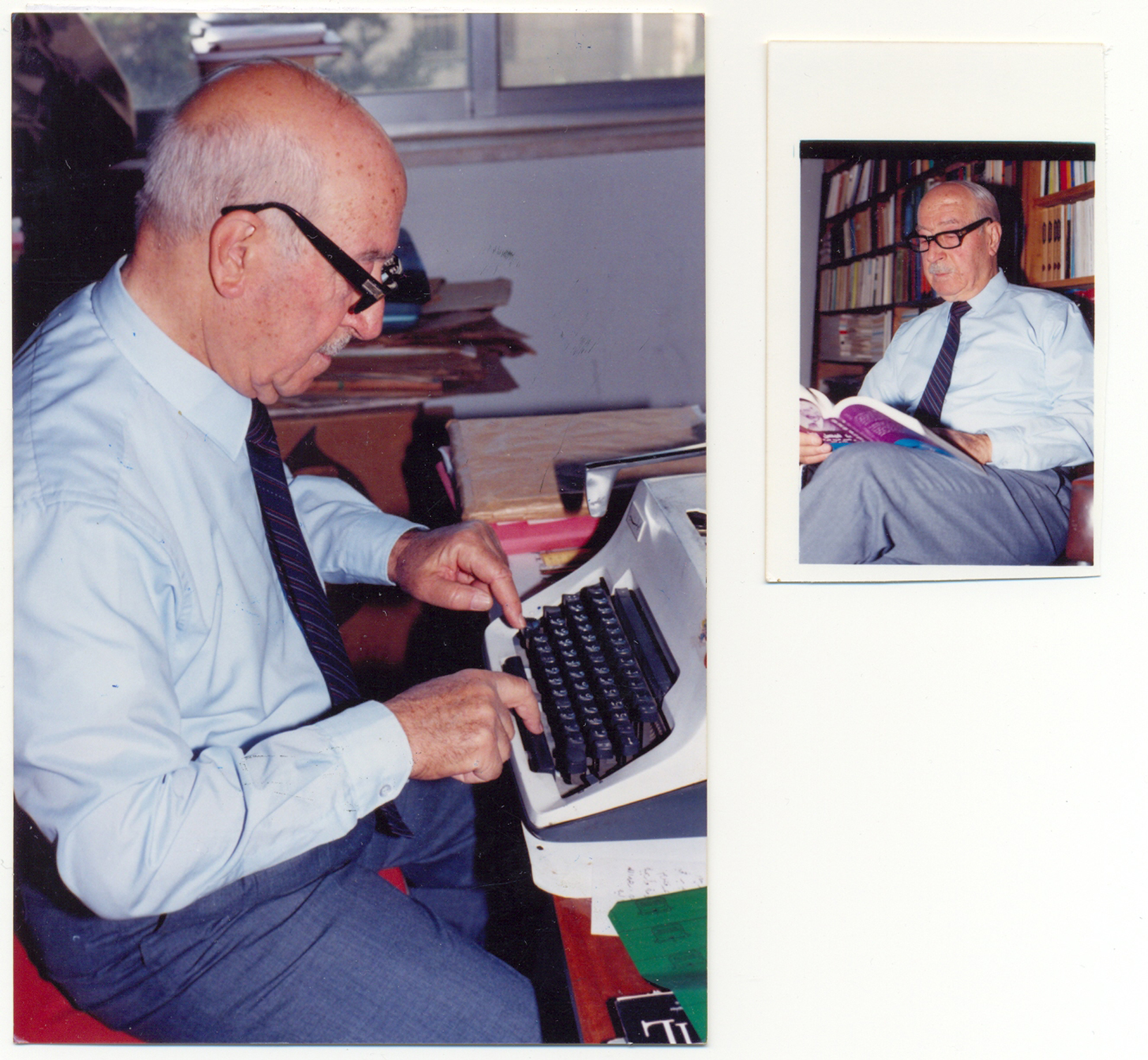
- Born: 11 June 1919; Al Rafeed, Occupied Enemy Territory Administration
- Died: 9 June 2008 (aged 88); Amman, Jordan
- Occupation: Writer / Historian
- Years active: 1935 until his death
- Notable work: T. E. Lawrence: An Arab View, History of Jordan in the 20th century, Biography of Sherif Hussein Bin Ali, Jordan in the 1948 War, The Great Arab Revolt
- Spouse: Georgette Nuseir

Suleiman Mousa (Arabic: سليمان الموسى) (11 June 1919 – 9 June 2008) was a Jordanian author and historian born in Al-Rafeed, a small village north of the city of Irbid. He wrote up to fifty books of which most prominent are Biography of Sharif Hussein Bin Ali, Jordan in the 1948 War, Great Arab Revolt, History of Jordan in the 20th century, and was the first and only Arab author to write about Lawrence of Arabia and show the Arab perspective.

His book T. E. Lawrence: An Arab View was published in 1966 and translated into English, French and Japanese. It was written after a study that had convinced him that although there were many books written to praise Lawrence and others written to discredit him, all of them exaggerated his part in the Arab Revolt and failed to do justice to the Arabs themselves.

== Life ==
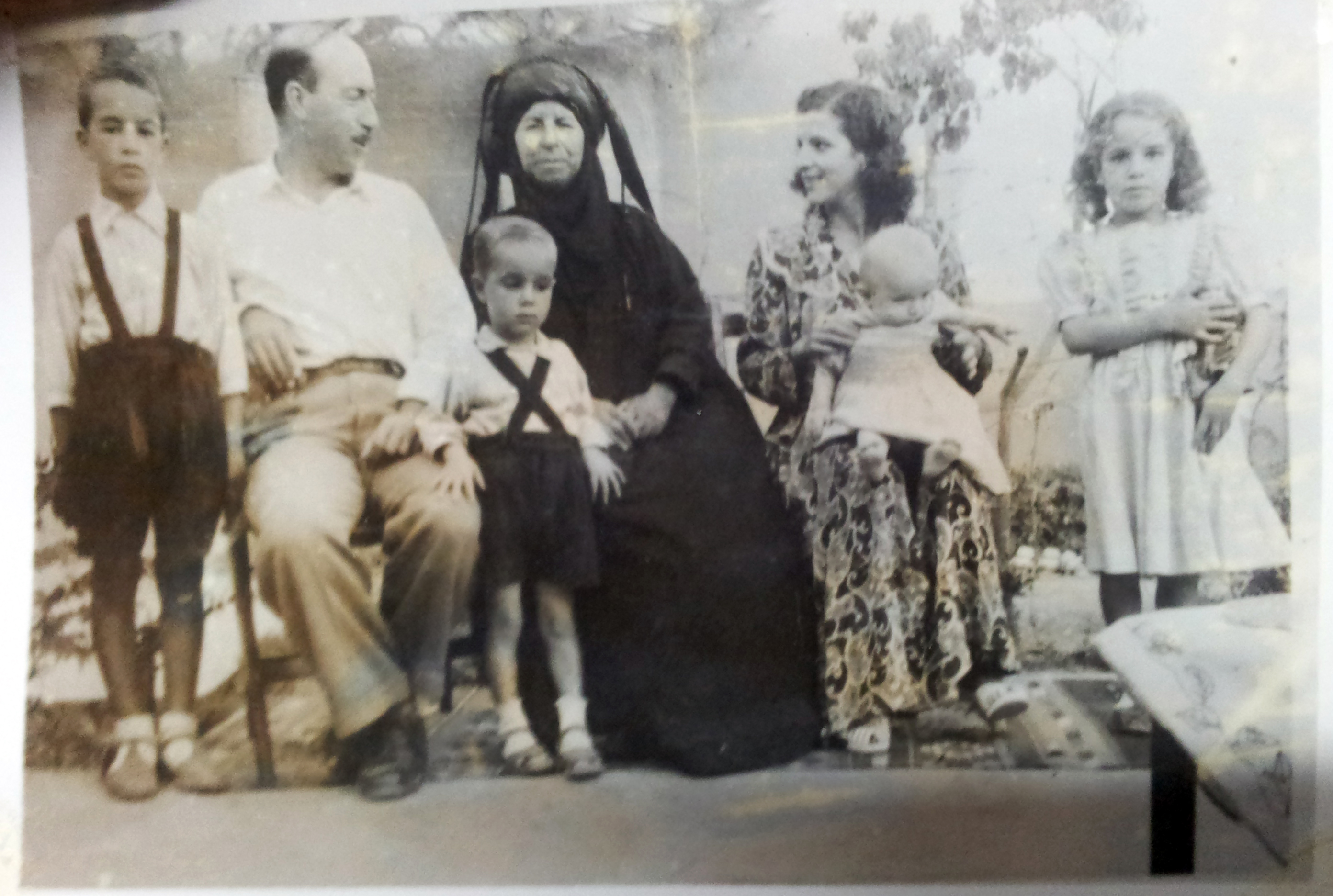
Suleiman Mousa with his wife, mother and children in 1953.

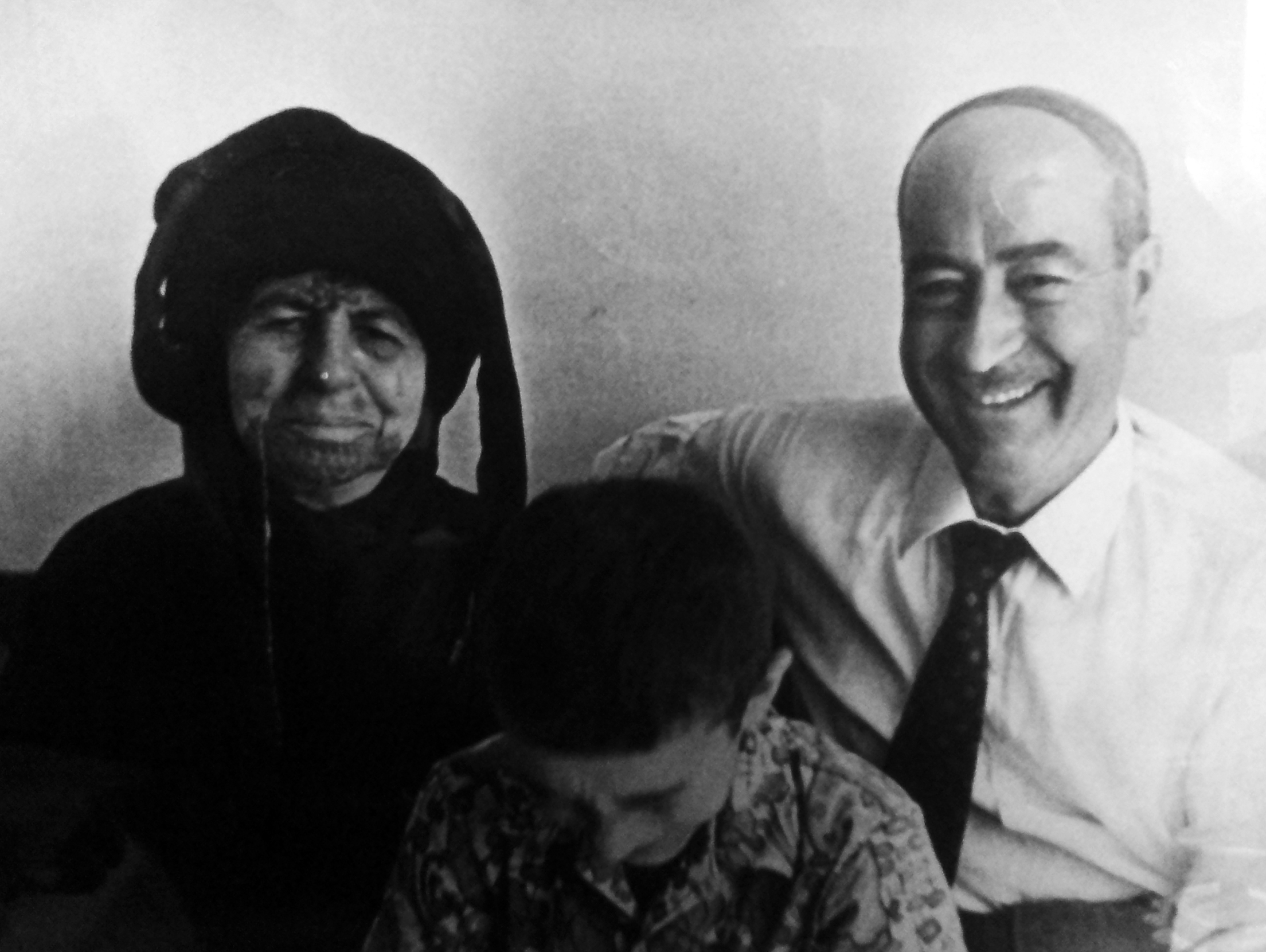
Mousa with his mother Farha Al-Nasser wearing traditional garb in August 1972.

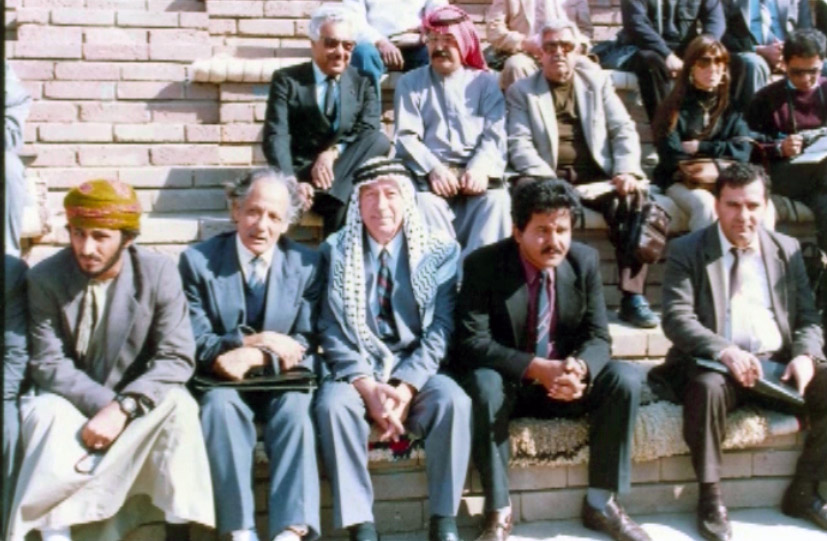
With a group of intellectuals at the Al-Marbed Poetry Festival in Basra, Iraq in 1988.

=== Youth ===
Suleiman Mousa was born to an Arab Christian family in the village of Al Rafeed, in 1919; the village overlooks the Yarmouk River and is located 20 km north of Irbid. The early death of his father, an unwealthy man with a passion for reading and writing, came as a shock to him, his mother and sister while Mousa was just six years old. Leaving them little but a cane basket containing several books, his mother took up the task of securing the family's needs. They lived a simple and spontaneous life as part of the village that depended mainly on agriculture for its survival.

After receiving his elementary education from religious scholars, Mousa moved to a small school known as Al Ta'ifa for three years. As were his mother's ambitions, he was then sent to a governmental school in Al Husn (الحصن), where he resided at his relatives' until May 1934, when he was unable to continue into high school due to the family's limited income. A few months later, at the age of sixteen, he took up the profession of teaching at the School of Irbid.

=== Employment ===
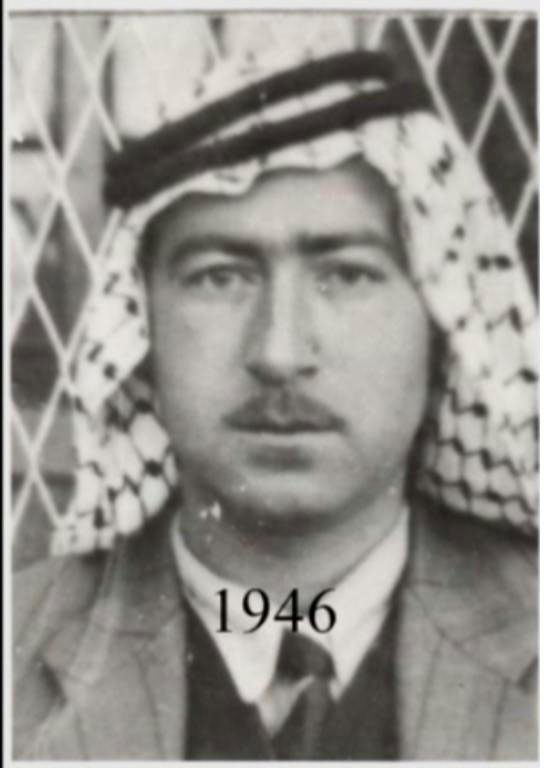
Suleiman Mousa, 1946

In 1936 he traveled to the city of Haifa in Palestine where he first began working. After returning to Irbid and resuming his profession as a teacher for a brief period, he decided to make the journey to Jaffa (يافا) by train, which interconnected it with Damascus and was part of the Hejaz Railway built by the Ottoman Empire. This journey had a significant impact on his cultural life as it was then that he started borrowing and purchasing books and novels from neighbouring libraries and fulfilling his passion of reading. He gradually learnt English using dictionaries, and published many articles in Palestinian newspapers as well as several short stories in 1938. As time progressed, he found himself leaning closer towards books of literature and poetry and his fascination in history developed.

He returned in 1939 to Al Rafeed where he continued working in the field of education before becoming an employee in the Iraq Petroleum Company in Mafraq. In 1943 he fulfilled a substantial commitment and married Georgette Nuseir whom he had met on a visit to Nazareth. Mousa spent fifteen years in Mafraq and his publications were put close to a halt due to the inappropriate and illiterate environment he went through although he managed to publish a few short stories, articles and translations.

A major transformation in his life occurred when Mousa moved to Amman, the Jordanian capital, and began working in the Jordanian Broadcasting Company in 1957, turning to the work of the publications service and the Ministry of Information and Culture until 1984. During that period, he was the editor of the Jordanian magazine ‘Resalat Al Ordon’ (1966 to 1967). Later on, Suleiman Mousa spent more than four years as a cultural adviser in the Greater Amman Municipality (GAM), from 1984 to 1988.

== Writer and historian ==
Mousa's first book Al Hussein Bin Ali and the Great Arab Revolt was published in 1957 where it was written when the author had been resident of Jaffa, Palestine in early 1939, when he was a mere nineteen years of age. The printing of this book occurred after nearly seventeen years of its writing.

One of the most prominent works of Suleiman Mousa is T. E. Lawrence: An Arab View, which has been translated into English, French and Japanese. This was a turning point for the author Mousa that has taken him to world fame. He showed the Arab's point of view about battles and events of The Great Arab Revolt, and also came in response to the British book written by Lawrence himself, who did not give the Arabs their right to the full extent. The author shows that Arabs fought in large numbers in the combat revolt against the Turkish rule for independence and freedom, and that they are the ones who fought and struggled, while Lawrence was merely an officer like any other in the British Army.

While the author was resident of Jaffa in 1937, his activities were expanded to English as well as Arabic history books and he purchased several books in English of which most important were The Seven Pillars of Wisdom by Lawrence and The Arab Awakening, by George Antonius, which emerged in its first edition in 1938.

Mousa wrote in regard to his interest in English:

An Arab writer must, with no doubt, know a language – in addition to his mother tongue – if he wishes to keep up with the course of world cultures and interact with them.

=== T. E. Lawrence: An Arab View ===
T. E. Lawrence: An Arab View, the only book that shows the Arab perspective on Lawrence of Arabia.

Of the articles written by Suleiman Mousa in Jaffa that sparked widespread attention was an article published by the name "Lawrence on the balance" (لورنس في الميزان) in Al Adab (الآداب) magazine (November 1955) which discussed the book written by Richard Aldington called Lawrence of Arabia: A Biographical Inquiry, which had appeared in Britain earlier that year. The idea of writing a book discussing the matter in an integrated manner from an Arab's perspective was based on the success the eight-page article received.

Five years later, the first Arabic edition of the book was published by the name T. E. Lawrence: An Arab View (لورنس والعرب: وجهة نظر عربية) followed by the translations into English in 1966, French in 1973 and Japanese in 1988. The book was translated into English by Dr. Albert Boutros, a professor of English at the University of Jordan. Many Arab and Western references were used for its writing. Mousa was visited by senior Western writers, including professors Colin Wilson and Jeremy Wilson. To this day, his book remains the only one that shows the Arab viewpoint. It has left a deep impact on all researchers interested in Lawrence. Hence, the book has won global reputation, and became a reference to researchers about the subject of Lawrence and the Great Arab Revolt.

Being taught in Arab and foreign universities including the University of Oxford in Britain is a sure sign of the success and attention this book has drawn. It was Professor Eugene Rogan from the University of Oxford who had remarked in a July 2000 speech:

Suleiman Mousa drew the attention of Western readers when he published his famous book ‘T.E Lawrence: An Arab View'. Indeed, the professors in the history of the Middle East in Western countries consider Mousa's books valuable research material. The book Days unforgotten: Jordan in the 1948 war is considered the best book written in Arabic about the 1948 war ... I hope that Western researchers continue expressing their gratitude to Suleiman Mousa for the credit he has provided them with. Beginning with his landmark history of Jordan, written in 1985 ... and running through a long list of books and scholarly articles written in Arabic and English, the Western historian of the region seldom embarks on a new subject without finding that Suleiman Mousa has been there first. In this sense, we are all students of Suleiman Mousa ... And so, on behalf of my Western colleagues, I wish to extend this word of appreciation to the great master of Jordanian history.

=== Internationally and locally ===
Suleiman Mousa, in addition to being a recognized researcher who achieved a breakthrough intellectually and in the Arab World, was also a local ‘people's’ author. He wrote in four major themes: Biographies, history of Jordan, history of Arab revolution and writings in literature and short stories, in addition to the translations of Arabic and several simplified books written for young people. Mousa relied on many diverse Arab, British and foreign sources.

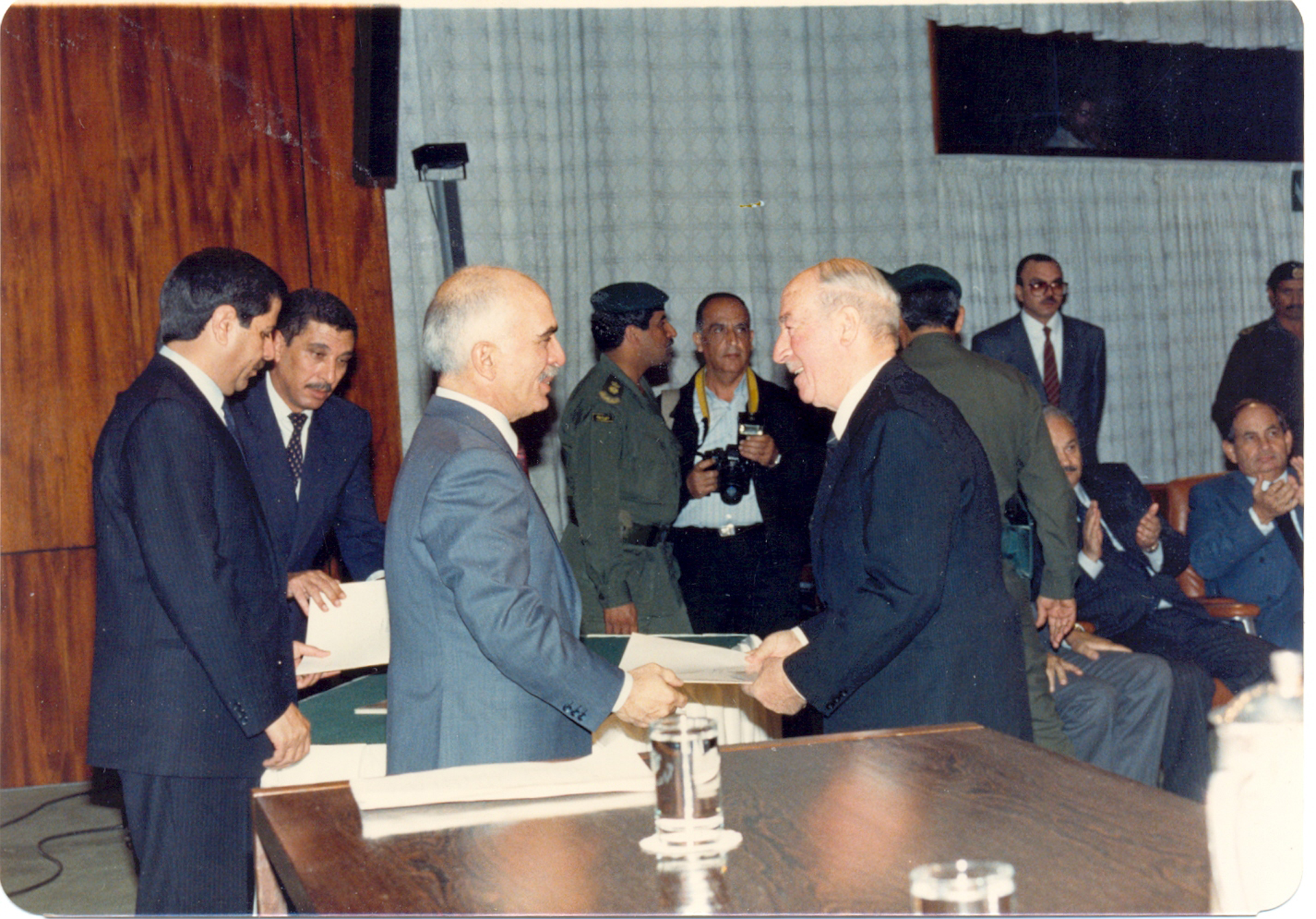
Mousa (right) with Hussein bin Talal (middle), then King of Jordan

He went to the Public Record Office in the United Kingdom in 1974 and spent four months researching documents relating to Jordan. Therefore, his works are considered indispensable references for many students and researchers.

Mousa won many awards in recognition of his contributions to Jordanian and Arab history including: The Order of Independence in 1971, King Abdullah I Award for research in Islamic civilization in 1988, the State Incentive prize in 1990, the Order of Al Hussein distinguished first class in 2007 and Medal of the Arab Author after his death in 2008.

== Death ==
Suleiman Mousa died on 9 June 2008, in Amman, Jordan two days prior of his eighty-ninth birthday. He died of congestive heart failure. Cultural officials participated in the funeral and wake as well as representatives of his majesty Abdullah II of Jordan, the Ministry of Culture, the media and many more of whom have praised his contributions in various creative fields.

== Posthumous recognition ==
Although Suleiman Mousa received numerous awards and honors during his lifetime, many projects have been launched posthumously in recognition of the contributions he has made to Jordanian, Middle Eastern and World history. The establishment of the Library of Suleiman Mousa at the (GAM), and the republishing of his complete works in several stages, with an "aim of introducing history to the new generation", are amongst the most prominent of these projects. Mousa was also awarded The Arab Author Medal in 2008 after his death.

=== Library of Suleiman Mousa ===
Library of Suleiman Mousa at Al Hussein Cultural Center of the Greater Amman Municipality (GAM).

On 11 November 2009, a library dedicated for the history of Jordan under the name of Suleiman Mousa, located at Al Hussein Cultural Center of the GAM, was inaugurated on behalf of the former Mayor of Amman, Omar Maani.

The library is divided into several sections, one for the titles related to the history of Jordan in Arabic, English and French. Another is allocated for books and personal possessions of Suleiman Mousa, as well as some documents he had been collecting during his work in writing, which his family donated to the library. At the inauguration, City Deputy Manager for Cultural, Social, and Sports Affairs, Haitham Jweinat, referred to the uniqueness of the new library, and said that it will be open for all interested readers and researchers, noting that the GAM had taken the time to equip it with many facilities, including an internet local area network (LAN) and the availability of international magazines and newspapers.

The library regularly receives visitors from schools and universities to introduce them to Middle Eastern history through documentaries, photos and library resources. Several scientific seminars and conferences have already taken place at the library. Its goal is to become one of the important developmental and economical projects in Jordan, and the place to launch books related to Arab history and the history of Jordan.

== Works ==
=== In Arabic ===
- History of Jordan in the twentieth century – Part I.
- History of Jordan in the twentieth century - Part II.
- Days Unforgotten: Jordan in the 1948 war.
- The Arab Movement.
- Historical Correspondence from 1914 to 1918.
- Historical Correspondence - Volume II, 1919.
- Historical Correspondence - the third volume from 1920 to 1923.
- Characters of Jordan - Wasfi, Hazaa, Al-Nabulsi.
- Characters of Jordan – Al-Rai Library, Abu Al-Huda and Mufti.
- Western Views.
- O Jerusalem.
- T. E Lawrence: An Arab View - was translated and published in English 1966, Oxford University Press,(ASIN B000OGOYN4), French 1973, Japanese 1989
- The Great Arab Revolt - The war in Hijaz from 1916 to 1918.
- Monuments of Jordan.
- Faces and Features – Part I.
- Faces and Features - Part II.
- Westerners in Arab Countries.
- Jordan and Palestine – Part I.
- Jordan and Palestine - Part II.
- Throughout Jordan.
- The Great Arab Revolt - and the documents and arguments.
- The Establishment of the Emirate of Jordan - 1921-1925, First Edition 1971.
- Notes, Prince Zeid - the war in Jordan, the first edition 1976.
- Images of the championship, the first edition 1968.
- Folded pages.
- Jordan contemporary political history of 1967-1995, the date of publication of the Commission of Jordan.
- Studies in Jordan's modern history - Book of the month.
- Al-Hussein Bin Ali and the Arab Revolt - a series of reading books, first edition 1957.
- East of the Emirate of Jordan 1921-1946
- The Other Side.
- The Days Notes.
- That Unknown Soldier.
- The Perfect Wife.
- Eighty: An Autobiography
- Steps on the Road.
- Jordan's capital Amman.
- Of our modern history - a book in the history of Jordan
  - Arab Revolt - the causes and the principles and objectives.
  - East of Jordan - before the founding of the emirate.
- Memories of the scenes.
- Pages of Jordan's modern history.
- For the Sake of Freedom.
- Al-Hussein Bin Ali.
- The Great Arab Revolt.

=== In English ===
- Cameos: Jordan and Arab Nationalism
- Land and People: Jordan, a Historical Sketch, 1921-1973

== Reviews of T. E. Lawrence: An Arab View ==
"Although many admirers of T.E. will prefer Lawrence's version of his part in the Arab Revolt, Mr. Mousa's obvious concern to be fair-minded and the weight of the evidence he produces makes his book one that must be studied by all who are interested in 'Lawrence of Arabia'. " - Oxford University Press, 1966

"...and if only for this passionate and compassionate, rehearsal of the bitter betrayal of Arab hopes in the interests of European power politics, this book (T.E. Lawrence: An Arab View) is worth reading. For, after all, therein lies the root of distrust which has poised Arab relations with the west for the past five decades." - Anthony Nutting, Sunday Telegraph News; 10 July 1966

"...However "nationalist" Mr. Mousa may be, he has been painstakingly, tediously thorough in examining this material and in assembling such evidence of Arab opinion as he could obtain..." - The Standard Times, 12 March 1967

"...The book needed writing and deserves reading...He writes honestly, stating his evidence fairly, and his book merits the serious consideration it asks," - Birmingham Post, 9 July 1966

"...is the first scholarly account to give the Arab view, and it is a highly persuasive and thoroughly researched examination of the Lawrence story...Mousa is an intelligent and passionate advocate of the Arab view..." - Quarterly Review, Summer 1967

"In T. E. Lawrence: An Arab View, Suleiman Mousa gathers a great variety of such details in an attempt to destroy the Lawrence myth. He is offended by Lawrence's egotism and has worked hard to restore the historical record to its proper proportions."- Michigan Quarterly Review, Summer 1969

"Suleiman Mousa's work had a deep and lasting influence over T.E. Lawrence scholarship. It showed how different those events looked through Arab eyes, and taught us to question the assumption that things happened - only, or indeed at all - because Lawrence wanted them to happen.
I believe that, in the long run, Western and Arab historians will reach a common view of the history of the Arab Revolt, based on all the evidence that has survived. By challenging the accepted Western view, Suleiman Mousa played an important part in that process. For that he deserves lasting recognition.".- British historian, Jeremy Wilson

== Awards and honors ==
- Ali Bin Al-Hussein Medal - The Independence Medal, Second Class, 1971.
- State Award for Literature, 1977.
- An Honorary shield from the first conference of the History of Jordan - 1980.
- Shield organized by the World Conference on the history of the King Abdul-Aziz - the Imam Muhammad ibn Saud Islamic University, Al-Riyadh - 1985.
- Abdullah Bin Al-Hussein Award for Research in Islamic civilization, 1988.
- Honorary gift from the Abdul Hameed Shoman Foundation and is a model of the Al-Aqsa mosque - in June 1989.
- Honorary shield from the University of Jordan in appreciation for the efforts of Suleiman Mousa in the history of Jordan - 1990.
- Arab Author Medal - in June 1991.
- The honorary shield Faha Sports Club of the Social and Cultural - September, 1993.
- The honorary shield Qurtubi Secondary School for Boys - in November 1995.
- The honorary shield from the Office of the people of the town of al-Rafid, Beni Kananeh - July 1996.
- The honorary shield from the Royal Medical Services - December, 1996.
- The honorary shield from the Center for Strategic Studies Jordan, on the occasion of the participation of Suleiman Mousa at the Second International Conference of the social history of Jordan - Amman in July 2000 - and that in recognition of its great foundation for the writing of the history of Jordan.
- Ali Bin Al-Hussein Medal - The Independence Medal of the First Order - in June 2002.
- The honorary shield from the Jordanian Writers Association - January 2006.
- Al-Hussein Medal for distinguished performance- May, 2007.
- The Shield of the Greater Amman Municipality.
- The Shield of the Ministry of Culture.
- The Shield of the Jordanian television channel.
- Shield from the Board of Trustees of the Documentation Center of the Hashemite monarchy of Jordan in recognition of outstanding contribution.
- Arab Author Medal - August, 2008.
