= Bert Hodgkinson =

Welsh footballer (1884-1939)

Personal information
- Full name: Albert Victor Hodgkinson
- Date of birth: 10 August 1884
- Place of birth: Pembroke Dock, Wales
- Date of death: 25 November 1939 (aged 55)
- Place of death: Shelton Lock, England
- Height: 5 ft 7 in (1.70 m)
- Position: Outside left

Youth career
- Old Normanton

Senior career*
Years	Team	Apps	(Gls)
1902–1903	Hinckley Town		
1903	Derby County	0	(0)
1903–1904	Grimsby Town	16	(4)
1904–1905	Plymouth Argyle	17	(4)
1905–1906	Leicester Fosse	33	(1)
1906–1907	Bury	18	(3)
1907–1909	Southampton	57	(18)
1909–1911	Croydon Common	38	(6)
1911	Southend United	10	(2)
1911–1912	Ilkeston United		

International career
1908	Wales	1	(0)
- * Club domestic league appearances and goals

Albert Victor Hodgkinson (10 August 1884 – 25 November 1939) was a Welsh footballer who played as an outside-forward for various clubs in the 1900s, including making one appearance for the Wales national football team in 1908.

== Football career ==
Hodgkinson was born at Pembroke Dock in South Wales, but grew up in Derbyshire. His first professional club was Derby County before he joined Grimsby Town of the Football League Second Division in October 1903. After a season at Blundell Park, in which he made seventeen appearances, scoring five goals, Hodgkinson moved in May 1904 to Devon, where he joined Plymouth Argyle of the Southern League. This was followed by seasons with Leicester Fosse of the Second Division and Bury in the First Division.

In May 1907, Hodgkinson returned to the Southern League when he joined Southampton, along with his Bury teammate John Johnston. Described by the Saints' historians, Holley and Chalk, as "a consistent performer with all his previous clubs", Hodgkinson was "still developing as a dashing outside-left" when he came to Southampton. He made his debut for the Saints on 7 September 1907, when he scored in a 3–2 defeat at home to Crystal Palace. He soon formed useful partnerships with his fellow Welsh forward John Lewis and with George Smith, going on to make 29 appearances in 1907–08, scoring nine goals as Southampton finished the league season in mid-table. He also played in all six FA Cup matches as Saints reached the semi-finals, losing to Wolverhampton Wanderers who went on to take the cup in the final.

The FA Cup fourth-round tie against Everton played at Goodison Park on Saturday 7 March 1908 was a 0–0 draw. The replay was arranged for the following Tuesday, but was put back by one day to allow Hodgkinson to attend the funeral of his brother, William Henry Hodgkinson, who had died, aged 26, on the Saturday. As a mark of respect, the Saints players wore black armbands. Saints won the replay 3–2, with two goals from "man-of-the-match", Frank Costello.

Hodgkinson is described by Holley & Chalk as

"a mercurial player, who would suddenly achieve the sensational only to, just as suddenly, disappear from prominence; he also rarely did what his opponents expected of him."

His reputation grew during his time at The Dell and on 11 April 1908, he played for Wales against Ireland; the match, held at the Athletic Ground, Aberdare ended in a 1–0 victory for the Irish.

He continued with the "Saints" for another season, at the end of which the club finished in third place, with Hodgkinson scoring 11 goals, just behind his fellow forwards Frank Costello on 13 and Arthur Hughes on 15.

In August 1909, Hodgkinson dropped down to non-league football with Croydon Common, followed by spells at Southend United and Ilkeston United.

== Life outside and after football ==
Hodgkinson was also a baseball player of some note, winning two gold medals at the National Baseball Association's annual tournament. (Note: The National Baseball Association was established in England in 1933 by Sir John Moores—see Baseball in the United Kingdom.)

After he retired from football, he settled in Derbyshire and was the owner of the Rose & Crown Inn at Chellaston near Derby. Following his retirement, the licensee was Tom Keetley who had had a long football career with Doncaster Rovers and Notts County.

== Family ==
Hodgkinson's brother, Bill was a centre-forward with Derby County, playing 16 matches, scoring nine goals in the Football League First Division in the 1903–04 season.
