= Harry Hodgkinson =

Harry Hodgkinson may refer to:

- Harry Hodgkinson (footballer) (1862–1945), English footballer
- Harry Hodgkinson (writer) (1913–1994), British writer, journalist, naval intelligence officer and expert on the Balkans

== See also ==
- Hodgkinson
