= Frank Thorpe =

English footballer (1879-1928)

Personal information
- Date of birth: 13 November 1879
- Place of birth: Hayfield, Derbyshire, England
- Date of death: 17 April 1928 (aged 48)
- Place of death: Blackpool, England
- Height: 6 ft 0 in (1.83 m)
- Position: Centre-half

Senior career*
Years	Team	Apps	(Gls)
1897–1900	Stalybridge Rovers		
1900–1901	Newton Heath	0	(0)
1901–1906	Bury	180	(2)
1906–1907	Plymouth Argyle		
1907–1909	Southampton	65	(5)
1909–1910	Bury	0	(0)
- * Club domestic league appearances and goals

Frank Thorpe (13 November 1879 – 17 April 1928) was an English footballer who played as a centre-half for various clubs in the 1900s, including Southampton and Bury, with whom he won the FA Cup in 1903.

== Playing career ==
Thorpe was born in Hayfield, Derbyshire and started his football career with Stalybridge Rovers, before a brief spell on the books of Newton Heath, where he failed to break into the first-team. In June 1901, he joined Bury, where he was re-united with his former Stalybridge teammate, wing-half John Johnston.

Thorpe soon became a fixture at centre-half, between Johnston on the right and the veteran George Ross on the left. In the league, Bury finished seventh in the First Division in 1901–02 and eighth in the following season. Ross played in all of Bury's matches in the FA Cup in 1902–03, reaching the final where Bury defeated Derby County in one of the most one-sided finals ever played. Bury's 6–0 victory still stands as the record Final win. Bury also equalled another record, winning the Cup without conceding a goal in any round. In the final itself, Thorpe's through ball in the 48th minute was slid past Derby County's injured goalkeeper Jack Fryer by Charlie Sagar for the second goal, following which Fryer was replaced in goal by Charlie Morris who conceded a further four goals in the next half-hour.

Thorpe continued at the centre of Bury's defence for the next two seasons, missing only one game in 1903–04 and three in the following season, but in 1905–06 he lost his place to Jack Dewhurst, who had recently arrived from Blackburn Rovers.

Thorpe spent the 1906–07 season with Plymouth Argyle of the Southern League, before moving along the south coast in April 1907 to join fellow Southern league team, Southampton. Thorpe made his debut in a 4–2 victory at Northampton Town on 6 April 1907, taking over at centre-half from James Bowden, who was moved to fill the left-half position, which had been not been filled satisfactorily since Bill Gray had been injured in March.

For the 1907–08 season, Thorpe was re-united with his former Stalybridge and Bury teammate, John Johnston. Thorpe was an intelligent centre-half, whose experience strengthened the "Saints" defence, and he was quickly appointed as team captain, helping the "Saints" to reach the FA Cup semi-finals where they went out to Wolverhampton Wanderers, beating First Division Everton en route.

After finishing 11th in the league in 1908, when Thorpe missed only three matches, Southampton started the 1908–09 season with seven consecutive victories, in which Thorpe scored three goals. The Saints continued this good form until Thorpe was injured in late December, to be replaced by Sam Jepp. With other key players such as Arthur Hughes and Frank Jefferis also suffering with injuries, Saints fell away until Thorpe's return at the end of March. Saints won four and drew three of the last seven games, and managed to finish in third place.

In the summer of 1909, Thorpe returned to Bury as a player-coach, working with the second eleven.

== Honours ==
=== As a player ===
Bury

- FA Cup winner: 1903
