= William Hodgkinson =

William Hodgkinson may refer to:

- William Hodgkinson (politician), Australian explorer, journalist, gold miner, and politician
- William Hodgkinson (footballer), English footballer
- William Wadsworth Hodkinson, American film distributor and movie theater owner
  - W. W. Hodkinson Corporation

== See also ==
- Will Hodgkinson, English journalist and author
