= Charles McKeer =

English footballer (1883–1957)

Personal information
- Full name: Charles Walter McKeer
- Date of birth: January qtr. 1883
- Place of birth: Farnham, England
- Date of death: 2 March 1957 (aged 73–74)
- Place of death: Aldershot, England
- Positions: Inside left; left-half

Senior career*
Years	Team	Apps	(Gls)
1904–19??	Southampton	0	(0)
- Royal Army Medical Corps
1910–1911	Southampton	4	(0)
- * Club domestic league appearances and goals

Charles Walter McKeer (1883 – 2 March 1957) was an English professional footballer who made four appearances in the midfield for Southampton in the Southern League in 1910 and 1911.

== Football career ==
McKeer was born in Farnham, Surrey and initially joined Southampton as an amateur in 1904, without making any first-team appearances. He later joined the Royal Army Medical Corps based at Aldershot and played football for them in the Hampshire League.

In April 1910, he left the army and signed as a professional for Southampton, making his first-team debut playing at inside-left in the final match of the 1909–10 season, a 3–1 victory over already-relegated Reading. McKeer made three further appearances in the following season, one at inside-left and two at left-half (as replacement for Bert Trueman), all three of which ended in defeats.

McKeer was released in the 1911 close season.
