= Frank Costello (disambiguation) =

Frank Costello (1891–1973) was an Italian-American crime boss of the Luciano crime family.

Frank Costello may also refer to:

- Frank Costello (The Departed)
- Frank Costello (footballer) (1884–1914), English footballer
- Frank Gibson Costello (1903–1987), architect in Australia
- Frank Costello (high jumper), winner of the 1965 high jump at the NCAA Division I Indoor Track and Field Championships
