= John Hodgkinson =

John Hodgkinson may refer to:

- John Hodgkinson (actor, born 1766) (1766–1805), English-born actor who moved to the United States
- John Hodgkinson (actor, born 1966), English actor
- John Hodgkinson (cricketer) (1873–1939), Australian cricketer
- John Hodgkinson (footballer, born 1871) (1871–1944), English footballer
- John Hodgkinson (footballer, born 1883) (1883–1915), English footballer
