= Sam Jepp =

English footballer (1885–1968)

Personal information
- Full name: Samuel Richard Jepp
- Date of birth: 22 February 1885
- Place of birth: Aldershot, England
- Date of death: 1968 (aged 82–83)
- Height: 5 ft 9 in (1.75 m)
- Position: Centre half

Youth career
- Aldershot Athletic
- Royal Army Medical Corps

Senior career*
Years	Team	Apps	(Gls)
1907–1911	Southampton	70	(2)
1911–1912	South Farnborough Athletic		
1912–1914	Swansea Town	20	(1)
- * Club domestic league appearances and goals

Samuel Richard Jepp (22 February 1885 – 1968) was an English professional footballer who played in various defence positions for Southampton and Swansea Town in the early twentieth century.

== Football career ==
Jepp was born in Northtown, Aldershot, Hampshire and played his youth football with Aldershot Athletic before joining the Royal Army Medical Corps. On leaving the Army, Jepp returned to Aldershot before being signed by Southampton of the Southern League in 1907.

He made his debut for the "Saints" on 15 February 1908, when he replaced former England international Harry Hadley at left-half in a 4–0 defeat at Brentford. He made four further appearances in the 1907–08 season, including each of the half-back positions and at right-back. In 1908–09, he had two runs in the side with six matches at left-half in October (replacing John Johnston with Bert Trueman switching to the right), and twelve matches from mid-January at centre-half whilst Frank Thorpe was out with injury.

His longest period in the side came in the 1909–10 season, when he took over from new signing Andrew Davidson after the first six matches, retaining the No. 5 shirt for the remainder of the season. Jepp started the following season as the regular centre-half, before losing his place to Frank Monk after five matches. Although Jepp made a further four appearances later in the season, including playing as centre-forward against Luton Town on New Year's Eve, he was unable to regain a regular place in the side and was released in the summer of 1911.

After spending a season back in northern Hampshire with South Farnborough Athletic, Jepp became one of Swansea Town's first professional players in 1912, and scored one goal in twenty league appearances. By the start of World War I, Jepp had returned to Aldershot and his football career was over.

== Family ==
His son, also Samuel Richard Jepp, was killed at Tobruk on 24 June 1942 while serving with the Royal Tank Regiment.
