= The Mint (book) =

1955 book written by T. E. Lawrence

- First (expurgated) general edition, 1955
- Author: T. E. Lawrence
- Language: English
- Publisher: Jonathan Cape
- Publication date: 1955 (general edition)
- Publication place: United Kingdom
- Pages: 206

The Mint is a book written by T. E. Lawrence (Note: Known as Lawrence of Arabia.) and published posthumously in 1955. It describes his time in the Royal Air Force, working, despite having held senior rank in the army (colonel), as an ordinary aircraftman, under an assumed name, 352087 Ross.

The book is notable, despite flaws noted by critics, for its sharp observation, for the insight it gives into Lawrence himself, and for the censorship issues around its publication.

In 1929 the novelist E. M. Forster corresponded with Lawrence. He wrote two detailed letters to him criticising The Mint, which he liked, and advising on how it might be improved.

== The Mint ==
The Mint concerns the period following the First World War when Lawrence decided to disappear from public view. He enlisted in the Royal Air Force under an assumed name, becoming 352087 Aircraftman Ross. (Note: The inside-front flap of the dust-jacket of the first edition records "When in 1922 T. E. Lawrence enlisted in the ranks of the RAF under the name of John Hume Ross, he was in a strange physical and mental state as a result of his war experiences.") The book is a closely observed autobiographical account of his experiences in the RAF. The book covers his initial training at RAF Uxbridge in 1922 and a part of his service at RAF Cranwell, 1925–26.

The book is divided into three parts:

- Part I: 'The Raw Material', with 29 chapters (many are 2 or 3 pages);
- Part II: 'In the Mill', with 22 chapters;
- Part III: 'Service', with 18 chapters.

The book's title likens the RAF training to a coin factory, with the men as 'The Raw Material' (part I) and life in the training camp as being 'In the Mill' (part II) that stamps the coins out of the blank metal. Lawrence appears to have wanted to have his past life and fame obliterated, when he wrote to Edward Garnett:

"The Air Force is not a man-crushing humiliating slavery, all its days. There is sun & decent treatment, and a very real measure of happiness, to those who do not look forward or back."

== Self-censorship ==
Lawrence stated that the book should not be published until after his death; in the prefatory note by his brother, A. W. Lawrence, who edited the text for publication, a letter from T. E. Lawrence to E. M. Forster is summarized "he felt unable to publish the book because of 'the horror the fellows with me in the force would feel at my giving them away... so The Mint shall not be circulated before 1950". Lawrence's brother took the further precaution of substituting "new names" in the expurgated edition for characters in A/c Ross's squad "in all passages which might have caused embarrassment or distress".

However, A. W. Lawrence notes that his brother had

"intended, in fact, to print a limited edition himself on a hand-press, and had already obtained enough copies for its frontispiece of a reproduction .. of a portrait drawing by Augustus John, now in the Ashmolean Museum."

Lawrence himself wrote "I shall bequeath you my notes on life in the recruits camp of the R.A.F. [which became The Mint] They will disappoint you."

In fact a limited edition of no more than 50 copies was published to protect United States copyright in 1936 by Doubleday, Doran and Company in Garden City, New York, probably around November, under Lawrence's pseudonym. Only 10 of these were (nominally) for general sale and priced at a prohibitive US$500,000 each.

== Censorship ==
Start of chapter 19 'Shit-cart' showing blanks for expurgations in both chapter title and main text

When The Mint finally achieved general publication in 1955 there were two editions, the expurgated edition and a limited edition containing the full uncensored text. The delay in publication and sensitivity surrounding the full text mainly concerned its barrack-room language (i.e., many "four-letter words") and frank references to bodily functions, which some people might still find offensive. However, social mores have changed since the 1950s with the result that the original text is now widely available.

For example, Chapter 19: 'SHIT-CART' was published under the clipped and apparently obscure title ' -CART' (see illustration). However any doubt as to the missing word is soon resolved as the chapter begins:

"At eight in the morning four of us stood about the Transport Yard feeling out of sorts with life. Just our luck to have clicked '[shit]-cart on a Monday, the double-load day."

A few lines later, '352087 A/c Ross' treats his readers to an even rougher word in common RAF usage:

"Hillingdon House looked forlorn, because of its black windows, behind whose wideness the clerks lounged with their first cups of tea. 'Jammy [cunts],' sneered Sailor enviously."

== Reception ==
Detail of title page showing elegant hardback style on cream cartridge paper

The novelist E. M. Forster corresponded with Lawrence, and in 1929 Forster wrote two detailed letters, as a sharply literary friend, criticising The Mint. There were many features that Forster liked, including the word picture of the drill sergeant "Stiffy" and the energy and style of parts I and II. Forster was not happy with the conclusion to the book which he felt to be insipid and trying too hard to be fair. But he much liked chapters 9 and 10 of part III, on the day of Queen Alexandra's funeral, and "Dance Night", when a soldier has his first sexual encounter. Reviewing Forster's letters, Jeffrey Meyers writes that "Forster rightly judged The Mint unequal to Seven Pillars".

The critic Irving Howe described Lawrence's The Mint in The Hudson Review as a "severely chiselled picture of barrack life: Joycean in style, sometimes brilliant in evocation, structured as a series of set-pieces, showing a decided advance in control over The Seven Pillars of Wisdom but too markedly an exercise, a self-conscious effort to write."

Jeremy Wilson (Note: Wilson maintained a large website of T. E. Lawrence studies including much material now out of UK copyright.) writes that "The Mint, written in a very different style to Seven Pillars, is, like Solzhenitsyn's One Day in the Life of Ivan Denisovich, a work of observation written by a highly intelligent man who found himself effectively imprisoned. Lawrence distilled its spare descriptions from events that he had witnessed over and over again. Both Seven Pillars and The Mint were for many years ranked among Penguin's Modern Classics."

Thomas J. O'Donnell studies and compares The Mint and Seven Pillars for clues to Lawrence's personality, writing that "in The Mint Lawrence in fact does assert his will to mastery, asserts himself against authority, and leads from the ranks", using his writing to "keep him known, embody his complexities, and perpetuate his dramatization of self".
