= Birkenhead F.C. =

Defunct English association football club

- Full name: Birkenhead Football Club
- Nickname: the Birks
- Founded: 1879
- Dissolved: 1910
- Ground: Birkenhead Park
To c. 1905 colours	From c. 1905 colours

Birkenhead Football Club was an English football club from the town of Birkenhead, then in Cheshire.

== History ==
The club was founded in 1879 by Robert Lythgoe of the Shropshire Union Railways and Canal Company. It played in the first Cheshire Senior Cup in 1879–80, losing its one tie to Northwich Victoria. The following season, Birkenhead reached the final, again against Victoria, but after a 1–1 draw, the club failed to turn up for the replay.

The club joined The Combination in 1899, and it remained a member until the 1909–10 season. It won the title once, in 1903–04, a gutsy goalless draw in the face of a gale force wind at Nantwich on Good Friday more or less securing the title, Chester overtaking Nantwich at the last to finish 4 points behind the Birks. However the club did not complete its final season, its part-record being transferred to Brymbo Victoria at the end of 1909, Birkenhead having only registered 1 point in 10 games.

Birkenhead entered the FA Cup from 1899 to 1901, and its last appearance was its best, reaching the third preliminary round; at that stage, at Nantwich, the Birks had a half-time lead and survived a penalty, but went down 2–1.

== Colours ==
Its first colours were red and white, which referred to red jerseys and white knickers; its jerseys were plain red until at least 1902. By 1904 it had changed to red and white jerseys, and in 1905 changed again to green and white jerseys.

== Ground ==
Its first ground was on Chester Street, with the Clarendon Arms being used for facilities. In 1882 the council gave permission to the club to open an enclosure on Birkenhead Park.

== Notable players ==
- Arthur Hughes, centre-forward in the mid-1900s who went on to play for Southampton
