= Tom Binder =

English footballer

Personal information
- Full name: Thomas Edwin Binder
- Date of birth: 26 January 1889
- Place of birth: Weldon, Northamptonshire, England
- Date of death: 23 August 1969 (aged 80)
- Place of death: Caldecott, Rutland, England
- Position: Outside right

Senior career*
Years	Team	Apps	(Gls)
19??–1912	Kettering		
1912–1914	Southampton	10	(1)
1914–19??	Kettering		
- * Club domestic league appearances and goals

Thomas Edwin Binder (26 January 1889 – 23 August 1969) was an English professional footballer who played as an outside forward for Southampton in the 1910s.

== Football career ==
Binder was born in Weldon, Northamptonshire and started his football career with nearby Kettering, then playing in the Southern League Second Division.

In March 1913, whilst still an amateur, he joined Southampton of the Southern League First Division and made his debut on 19 April, in place of Len Andrews, in a 3–0 defeat at Norwich City in the penultimate game of the season. He retained his place for the final match of the season a 3–3 draw with Gillingham.

During the summer of 1913, he was awarded a professional contract and played the first six matches of the 1913–14 season before losing his place to Joe Blake. Binder spent most of the remainder of his time at The Dell in the reserves, making only two further first team appearances and in the summer of 1914 he returned to Kettering.
