= Stalybridge Rovers F.C. =

Defunct English football club

Stalybridge Rovers
- Full name: Stalybridge Rovers Football Club
- Nickname: the Bridgeites
- Founded: 1889; 136 years ago
- Dissolved: April 1908; 117 years ago
- Ground: Crookbottom
- Capacity: unknown
Home colours

Stalybridge Rovers Football Club was an English football club from Stalybridge, Cheshire at the end of the 19th century and early 20th century.

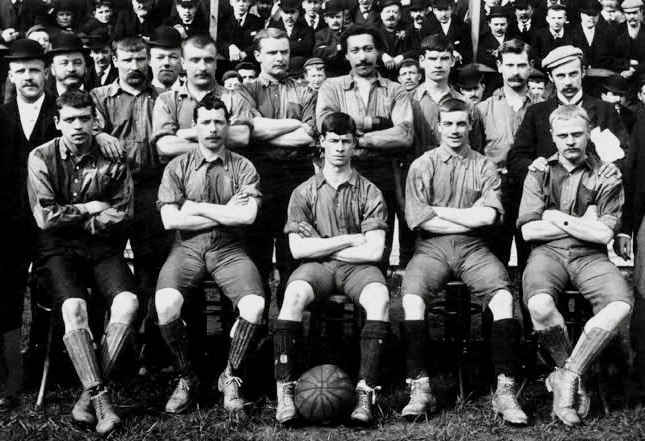
Stalybridge Rovers F.C., circa 1895. Arthur Wharton is in the back row.

== History ==
Stalybridge Rovers joined The Combination in 1894, staying for one season, finishing fifth. In 1895 they joined the Lancashire League and played there for eight seasons; they were League champions in 1900–01. They left the League in 1903 to join the Second Division of the Lancashire Combination, winning promotion to the First Division in their inaugural season. However they finished bottom of the division in 1906–07 and left the Combination soon after.

Stalybridge first entered the FA Cup in 1894, enjoying their best run in 1899–1900, beating South Liverpool, Stockport County and then Burslem Port Vale 1–0 in the fifth qualifying round before losing to Bristol City 2–1 in the first round proper.

The club made two attempts at entry to the Football League, in 1900 and 1901. The first attempt only gained one vote. The second attempt saw them gaining the same number of votes as rejected League members Walsall, seven, but they lost out to first time applicants Bristol City, who gained election with 23 votes.

Rovers folded in April 1908, when the club became unable to pay its players. Failure to fulfil a fixture at Clitheroe Central led to expulsion from the Lancashire Combination second division.

== Colours ==
The club wore red or cardinal shirts as a Lancashire League member, but changed to amber jerseys with black shorts in 1903, and amber and black stripes in 1906.

== Ground ==
The club played at Crookbottom, off Wakefield Road.

== Players ==
Famous players for Stalybridge Rovers include Herbert Chapman, who later led Huddersfield Town and Arsenal to the First Division title as manager, who played for the club circa 1897; and Arthur Wharton, Britain's first black professional footballer, who played for Stalybridge Rovers from 1896 to 1897, and again from 1899 to 1900. It is not clear if the two ever played together.

Other players included former Blackburn Rovers and Woolwich Arsenal star Tommy Briercliffe, and John Johnston and Frank Thorpe, who both went on to play for Bury, where they won the FA Cup in 1903, and later for Southampton.

== See also ==
- Stalybridge Celtic, founded 1909, who still play in Stalybridge.
