= Seven Pillars of Wisdom =

Book by T. E. Lawrence

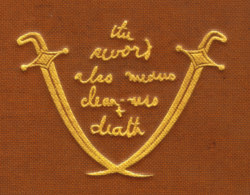
- Tooling on the cover of the first public printing, showing twin scimitars and the legend: "the sword also means clean-ness + death"
- Author: T. E. Lawrence
- Language: English
- Publisher: private edition
- Publication date: 1926 (completed 1922)
- Publication place: United Kingdom
- ISBN: 0-9546418-0-9
- OCLC: 54675462

Seven Pillars of Wisdom is the autobiographical account of the experiences of British Army Colonel T. E. Lawrence ("Lawrence of Arabia") while serving as a military advisor to Bedouin forces during the Arab Revolt against the Ottoman Empire of 1916 to 1918.

It was completed in February 1922 but first published in December 1926. It was originally published for the US market in 1927 as Revolt in the Desert and is the only version that was commercially released while he was alive. Seven Pillars of Wisdom (1935) is a longer form of the book at almost double the page count and released to the international market.

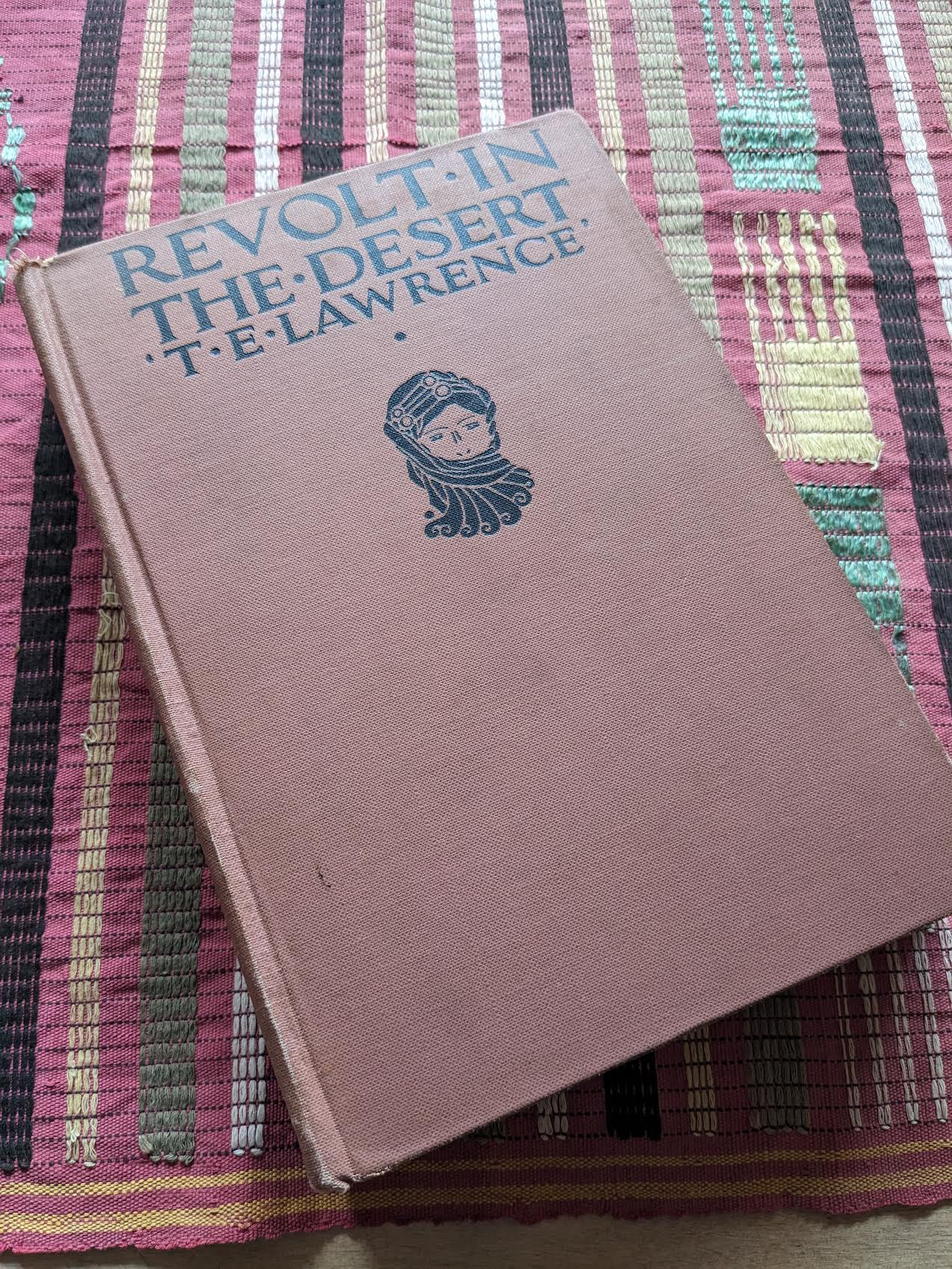
Revolt in the Desert was the only version of Seven Pillars of Wisdom published for the general public in Lawrence’s lifetime.

== Title ==
The title comes from the Book of Proverbs: "Wisdom hath builded her house, she hath hewn out her seven pillars" (Proverbs 9:1) (King James Version). Before the First World War, Lawrence had begun work on a scholarly book about seven great cities of the Middle East, (Note: The seven cities were Cairo, Smyrna, Constantinople, Beyrout, Aleppo, Damascus, and Medina.) to be called Seven Pillars of Wisdom. It was incomplete when war broke out and Lawrence stated that he destroyed the manuscript. He used his original title for the later work.

The book had to be rewritten three times, once following the loss of the manuscript on a train at Reading railway station. From Seven Pillars, "... and then lost all but the Introduction and drafts of Books 9 and 10 at Reading Station, while changing trains. This was about Christmas, 1919." (p. 21)

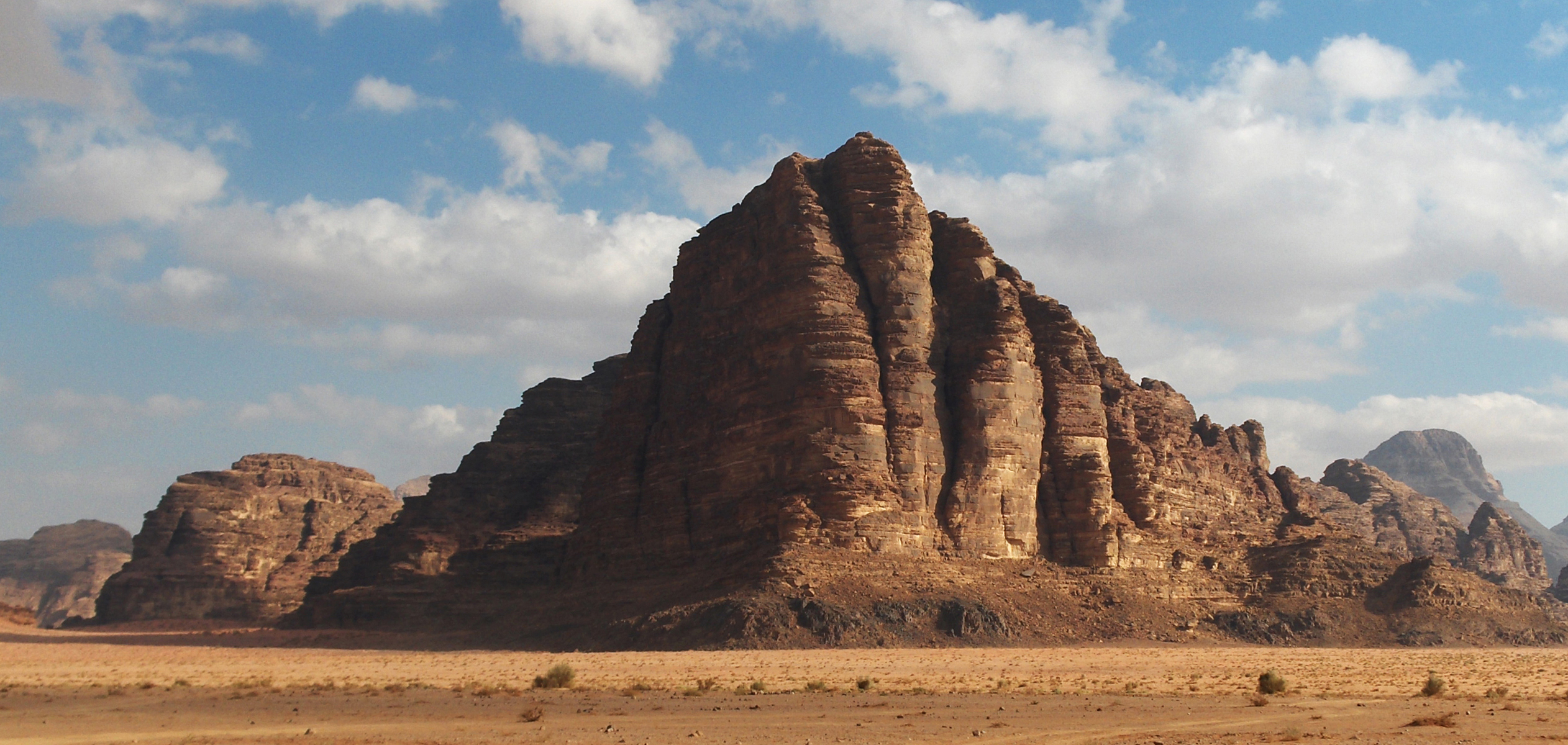
"The Seven Pillars" rock formation in Wadi Rum, Jordan

Seven Pillars of Wisdom is an autobiographical account of his experiences during the Arab Revolt of 1916–1918, when Lawrence was based in Wadi Rum in Jordan as a member of the British Forces. With the support of Emir Faisal and his tribesmen, he helped organise and carry out attacks on the Ottoman forces from Aqaba in the south to Damascus in the north. Many sites inside the Wadi Rum area have been named after Lawrence to attract tourists, although there is little or no evidence connecting him to any of these places, including the rock formations near the entrance now known as "The Seven Pillars".

== Manuscripts and editions ==
Some Englishmen, of whom Kitchener was chief, believed that a rebellion of Arabs against Turks would enable England, while fighting Germany, simultaneously to defeat Turkey.
Their knowledge of the nature and power and country of the Arabic-speaking peoples made them think that the issue of such a rebellion would be happy: and indicated its character and method.

So they allowed it to begin ...

— Seven Pillars of Wisdom, Introduction

Lawrence kept extensive notes throughout the course of his involvement in the Revolt. He began work on a clean narrative in the first half of 1919 while in Paris for the Peace Conference and, later that summer, while back in Egypt. By December 1919, he had a fair draft of most of the ten books that make up the Seven Pillars of Wisdom but lost it (except for the introduction and final two books) when he misplaced his briefcase while changing trains at Reading railway station. (Note: Graves refers to this incident not as a misplacement but as a theft: "[Lawrence] has never imagined a political motive for the theft, but his friends have. They even whisper darkly that one day the lost text may reappear in certain official archives.") (Note: Jeremy Wilson, author of Lawrence of Arabia: The Authorised Biography of T. E. Lawrence, also describes it as having been stolen.) National newspapers alerted the public to the loss of the "hero's manuscript", but the draft was not recovered. Lawrence refers to this version as "Text I" and says that had it been published, it would have been some 250,000 words in length.

In early 1920, Lawrence set about the daunting task of rewriting as much as he could remember of the first version. Working from memory alone (he had destroyed many of his wartime notes upon completion of the corresponding parts of Text I), he was able to complete this "Text II", 400,000 words long, in three months. Lawrence described this version as "hopelessly bad" in literary terms, but historically it was "substantially complete and accurate". This manuscript, titled by Lawrence The Arab Revolt, is held by the Harry Ransom Center of the University of Texas with a letter from Lawrence's brother authenticating it as the earliest surviving manuscript of what would become Seven Pillars of Wisdom.

With Text II in front of him, Lawrence began working on a polished version ("Text III") in London, Jeddah, and Amman during 1921. Lawrence completed this text comprising 335,566 words in February 1922.

To eliminate any risk of losing the manuscript again, and to have copies that he could show privately to critics, he considered having the book typed out. However, he discovered that it would be cheaper to get the text typeset and printed on a proofing press at the Oxford Times printing works. Just eight copies were produced, of which six survive. In bibliographical terms the result was the first "edition" of Seven Pillars (because the text was reproduced on a printing press). In legal terms, however, these substitutes for a typescript were not "published". Lawrence retained ownership of all the copies and chose who was allowed to read them. The proof-printing became known as the "Oxford Text" of Seven Pillars. As a text it is unsatisfactory because Lawrence could not afford to have the proof corrected. It therefore contains innumerable transcription errors, and in places lines and even whole paragraphs are missing. He made corrections by hand in five of the copies and had them bound. In 2001, the last time one of these rough printings came on to the market, it fetched almost $1 million (equivalent to $1.82 million in 2025) at auction. Instead of burning the manuscript, Lawrence presented it to the Bodleian Library in Oxford.

By mid-1922, Lawrence was in a state of severe mental turmoil: the psychological after-effects of war were taking their toll, as were his exhaustion from the literary endeavours of the past three years, his disillusionment with the settlement given to his Arab comrades-in-arms, and the burdens of being in the public eye as a perceived "national hero". It was at this time that he re-enlisted in the armed forces under an assumed name, for the most part in the Royal Air Force, as described in his book The Mint with the byline "by 352087 A/c Ross", with a period in the Royal Tank Corps as "Private Shaw". Concerned over his mental state and eager for his story to be read by a wider public, his friends persuaded him to produce an abridged version of Seven Pillars, to serve as both intellectual stimulation and a source of much-needed income. In his off-duty evenings, he set to trimming the 1922 text down to 250,597 words for a subscribers' edition.

In a chapter of the 1922 Oxford text not included in the subscriber's edition, Lawrence expresses in a heartfelt tone his feeling of shame at how the revolt was betrayed by the colonial powers (France and United Kingdom) with the secret Sykes-Picot agreement for the partition of the Middle East. An extremely rare copy of the original manuscript, which includes the excluded chapter, was auctioned in England in 2022 at the starting price of £65,000. With Lawrence's words: "[That was] an Arab war waged and led by Arabs for an Arab aim in Arabia … a new nation, to restore a lost influence [and build] an inspired dream palace of their national thoughts".

The Subscribers' Edition—in a limited print run of about 200 copies, each with a unique, sumptuous, hand-crafted binding—was published in late 1926, with the subtitle A Triumph. It was printed in London by Roy Manning Pike and Herbert John Hodgson, with illustrations by Eric Kennington, Augustus John, Paul Nash, Blair Hughes-Stanton and his wife Gertrude Hermes. Copies occasionally become available in the antiquarian trade and can easily command prices of up to US$100,000. Unfortunately for Lawrence, the edition cost £13,000 to produce compared with £6,300 raised by sale of 200 thirty guinea subscriptions. (Note: "He was so keen to do things well that he actually spent £13,000 on the edition—the reproduction of the pictures alone cost him more than the subscriptions—leaving him £10,000 out of pocket.")

The Subscribers' Edition was a little over 25% (84,969 words) shorter than the Oxford Text, but Lawrence did not abridge uniformly. The deletions from the early books are much less drastic than those of the later ones: for example, Book I lost 17% of its words and Book IV lost 21%, compared to 50% and 32% for Books VIII and IX. Critics differed in their opinions of the two editions: Robert Graves, E. M. Forster, and George Bernard Shaw preferred the 1922 text, although, from a legal standpoint, they appreciated the removal of certain passages that could have been considered libellous (or at least indiscreet), while Edward Garnett preferred the 1926 version.

Literary merits aside, however, producing the Subscribers' Edition had left Lawrence facing bankruptcy. He was forced to undertake an even more stringent pruning to produce a version for sale to the general public: this was the 1927 Revolt in the Desert, a work of some 130,000 words: "An abridgement of an abridgement", remarked Shaw, not without disdain. Nevertheless, it received wide acclaim by the public and critics alike, the vast majority of whom had never seen or read the less-abridged Subscribers' Edition.

After the 1926 release of the Subscribers' Edition, Lawrence stated that no further issue of Seven Pillars would be made during his lifetime. Lawrence was killed in a motorcycle accident in May 1935, at age 46; within weeks of his death, the 1926 abridgement, as well as the first unabridged US edition by Doubleday, Doran & Company, Inc., were released to the general public. The Doubleday edition was first released in a limited run of 750 copies, with a standard run released afterward. An unabridged edition was not published again until 1997, when the unabridged Oxford Text of 1922 appeared as a "best text" edited by Jeremy Wilson from the manuscript in the Bodleian Library, alongside Lawrence's amended copy of the 1922 proof printing. Wilson made some further minor amendments in a new edition published in 2003.

== Synopsis ==
The narrative begins with Lawrence's assignment to the Arab Bureau in Cairo, where he is tasked with intelligence gathering, mapmaking, and analyzing Ottoman military positions in the Middle East. Through his work, he recognizes the strategic value of an Arab uprising, which could divert Ottoman resources and support the Allied war effort. Lawrence is subsequently sent to the Hejaz to assess the Arab rebellion, led by Sherif Hussein of Mecca and his sons, against Ottoman rule.

In the Hejaz, Lawrence forms a close working relationship with Emir Faisal, the third son of Sherif Hussein, and becomes his primary British liaison. Lawrence adopts Arab customs and attire, integrating into the local culture and gaining a deep understanding of tribal dynamics. He observes the limitations of the traditional Arab fighting methods, which are primarily based on tribal skirmishes, and proposes a new strategy of irregular warfare. This approach emphasizes swift, mobile operations, psychological impact, and disruption of key Ottoman infrastructure, particularly the Hejaz Railway, which serves as the logistical lifeline for the Ottoman garrison in Medina.

A pivotal moment in the book is the capture of Aqaba in July 1917. Lawrence leads a group of Arab irregulars on a challenging desert journey to outflank the Ottoman defenses along the Red Sea coast. The campaign culminates in a surprise landward assault, which overwhelms the Ottoman garrison and results in the strategic capture of Aqaba. This victory secures a vital supply route for British naval forces and significantly boosts the morale and operational capabilities of the Arab Revolt.

Following the capture of Aqaba, Lawrence continues to lead raids against the Hejaz Railway, focusing on the destruction of bridges, culverts, and rail tracks. These operations, carried out under harsh desert conditions, severely disrupt Ottoman supply lines and force them to divert resources to repairs and protection. The sabotage efforts contribute to the isolation of Ottoman forces in Medina and weaken their overall position in the region.

As the revolt progresses into 1918, Lawrence coordinates with General Allenby's British Egyptian Expeditionary Force in Palestine, planning synchronized offensives to pressure retreating Ottoman forces. The narrative culminates with the Arab army's advance into Syria, culminating in the capture of Damascus in October 1918. This victory marks the end of Ottoman control over the city and is a symbolic triumph for the Arab cause.

In the aftermath of the capture of Damascus, Lawrence describes the efforts to establish an Arab administration in the city. He details the logistical difficulties of maintaining order and forming a provisional government from the various Arab factions. However, Lawrence soon witnesses the implications of secret agreements such as the Sykes-Picot Agreement, which had secretly divided the Middle East into British and French spheres of influence. These agreements prevent the realization of a unified Arab state and instead lead to the establishment of mandates over the territories liberated by the revolt. Lawrence's account provides a critical reflection on the political realities that followed the Arab Revolt and the eventual disillusionment of many who had hoped for greater Arab autonomy.

== Critical comments ==
An advertisement for the 1935 edition quotes Winston Churchill as saying, "It ranks with the greatest books ever written in the English language. As a narrative of war and adventure it is unsurpassable."

As a specialist in the Middle East, Fred Halliday praised Seven Pillars as a "fine work of prose" but described its relevance to the study of Arab history and society as "almost worthless". The diplomat and academic Charles Hill has called Seven Pillars "a novel traveling under the cover of autobiography", capturing Lawrence's highly personal version of the historical events described in the book.

These critiques, however, scarcely defend themselves with details about what aspects of his career Lawrence has falsified. Halliday claims that Lawrence did not speak Arabic well, and that his portrait of the Hashemites—who failed to gain a controlling influence over the region due to British diplomatic betrayal—is 'romanticized'. But this betrayal is covered by Lawrence in a chapter that was cut from the final text by publishers, as critics always fail to mention. Many of the later academic critiques of Lawrence are based on a work of concentrated character assassination by Richard Aldington published in 1954. Aldington made a career out of skewering his more famous friends in thinly veiled parodies or—as in the case of Lawrence, whose work he attacked posthumously—in gossipy and insinuating tell-alls.

The elements of Seven Pillars of Wisdom critiqued by historians reflect a true problem with the book that is better explained by Stanford historian Priya Satia, who observes that Seven Pillars presents the Middle East with a broadly positive, yet 'Orientalist' perspective. Lawrence's romanticised and vivid depictions transformed him into a sought-after symbol of Britain's leadership and goodwill in the Middle East. This occurred during a time when Britain's global influence was waning, and the nation was grappling with the aftermath of the First World War. Therefore, his "...books evoked a vision of redemption from the troubled spirit of the age" and offered a "reassurance of continuity" with Britain's triumphant history.

In other words, "the myth that reading Lawrence of Arabia is necessary to understand the Middle East", which Halliday's critique of the book refutes is indeed a myth: other data offering a differing inflections and a different picture exist. The notion that this devalues The Seven Pillars of Wisdom however is misleading. Churchill's history of the World Wars is highly coloured by his British imperialistic views, but contains uniquely privileged reporting of events because of his position in the British Empire; likewise, Lawrence's account of the Arab Revolt.

== In popular culture ==
The book is mentioned at the end of the first chapter of Nevil Shute's 1954 book Slide Rule.

The book was partially the basis of the film Lawrence of Arabia (1962), which won seven Academy Awards including Best Picture in 1963.

"Seven Pillars of Wisdom" is a song by power metal group Sabaton about Lawrence, released in July 2019 on the album The Great War.

In Tony Parsons's novel The Murder Bag (2014), the Seven Pillars is referenced as part of the curriculum at Potters Field school, and has a formative influence on a group of former pupils.

== Editions ==
=== Unabridged ===
1. The Arab Revolt (1920): Earliest surviving but still unpublished unabridged manuscript of Text II containing approximately 400,000 words which later became the Seven Pillars of Wisdom authenticated by A. W. Lawrence with a letter and held currently by the Harry Ransom Center of the University of Texas.
2. Seven Pillars of Wisdom (1922): Unabridged manuscript of Text III in Oxford University collection containing 10 books and the introductory book totalling 139 chapters, the full epilogue, and 2 appendices. Edited by Jeremy Wilson (1997), ISBN 0-9546418-0-9.
3. Seven Pillars of Wisdom (1940): Published by Jonathan Cape Limited—first uncensored publication of the Subscribers' Edition that restores the suppressed introduction that was omitted from the previous 1926 Suscribers' edition and 1935 Trade editions.
4. Seven Pillars of Wisdom: A Triumph 1922 and 1926 Parallel Texts (two-volume set edited by Jeremy Wilson, 2008). Per the publisher's limitation statement, the edition was limited to 50 sets, of which sets numbered 1–37 were bound in quarter goatskin and sets numbered i–xiii were "reserved". The 37 sets are bound in the publisher's quarter brown Morocco goatskin with brown buckram sides, the contents bound with brown endpapers, brown top edge stain, and silk head and tail bands. The two volumes are housed in the publisher's stout, unadorned brown buckram slipcase. This is currently the only edition for comparative editions of both 1922 and 1926 versions containing annotated corresponding parallel texts.

=== Abridged ===
1. Lawrence, T. E. (1926). Seven Pillars of Wisdom (first publication). Subscribers' editions. ISBN 0-385-41895-7.. The suppressed introductory chapter was excluded in this edition. It contains 10 books and the Introductory book totalling 122 chapters, a single-page epilogue, and 2 appendices
2. Lawrence, T. E. (1927). Revolt in the Desert (abridged 37-chapter ed.). ISBN 1-56619-275-7.. The US edition contains an introduction not present in the UK edition.
3. War in the Desert (2016) - the abandoned 77-chapter abridgement of the 1922 Oxford Text that has never been published before, co-authored with Edward Garnett (Edited by Jeremy and Nicole Wilson).

==== Mass market editions of the Subscribers' Edition ====
1. Lawrence, T. E. (1935). Seven Pillars of Wisdom (posthumous ed.). London, UK & Toronto, CA: Jonathan Cape (published 29 July 1935). ISBN 0-385-07015-2.
2. Lawrence, T. E. (1935). Seven Pillars of Wisdom (posthumous ed.). Garden City, New York, USA: Doubleday, Doran & Company, Inc. ISBN 978-0-385-07015-7.

== General and cited sources ==
- Graves, Robert (1927). Lawrence and the Arabs. London: Jonathan Cape. ISBN 978-0-7861-0781-0.
- Wilson, Jeremy (1989). Lawrence of Arabia: The Authorised Biography of T. E. Lawrence. London: William Heinemann. ISBN 978-0-434-87235-0.
- Wilson, Jeremy. "T. E. Lawrence, Seven Pillars of Wisdom: Publishing History". T. E. Lawrence Studies. Archived from the original on 2 May 2006.
- Wilson, Jeremy. "Seven Pillars of Wisdom—Triumph and Tragedy". T. E. Lawrence Studies. Archived from the original on 17 May 2008.
