= Lawrence of Arabia: The Authorised Biography of T. E. Lawrence =

1989 book by Jeremy Wilson

- U.S. edition (Atheneum)
- Author: Jeremy Wilson
- Language: English
- Genre: Biography
- Publisher: William Heinemann
- Publication date: 1989
- Publication place: United Kingdom
- Media type: Hardcover
- Pages: 1188
- ISBN: 978-0-434-87235-0
- OCLC: 21972900
- Dewey Decimal: 940.4/15/092 B 20
- LC Class: D568.4.L45 W55 1989

Lawrence of Arabia: The Authorised Biography of T. E. Lawrence is a book by Jeremy Wilson about the noted historic figure T. E. Lawrence ("Lawrence of Arabia"), who helped lead the Arab Revolt against the Ottoman Empire during World War I. It was published in 1989, first by William Heinemann Ltd., London, then in the United States by Atheneum, New York.

Michael Coren in the Toronto Star described this as "an unremarkable book", but it was named as one of the 14 best books of 1990 by The New York Times. Nigel Nicolson, reviewing for The New York Times, wrote "This biography will endure beside Seven Pillars as his monument, and any future book about T. E. Lawrence will be but a commentary on it."
