= Frank Monk =

English footballer (1886-1962)

Personal information
- Full name: Frank Vivian Monk
- Date of birth: July qtr 1886
- Place of birth: Salisbury, England
- Date of death: 15 November 1962 (aged 76)
- Height: 5 ft 10 in (1.78 m)
- Position: Centre-half

Senior career*
Years	Team	Apps	(Gls)
- Salisbury City
1910–1911	Southampton	19	(0)
1911	Glossop	2	(0)
1911	Fulham	0	(0)
1911–1912	Southampton	1	(0)
1912	Fulham	0	(0)
1912	Salisbury City		

International career
1911	England (amateur)	4	
- * Club domestic league appearances and goals

Frank Vivian Monk (1886 – 15 November 1962) was an English amateur footballer who had a brief career with several professional clubs around 1910.

== Early career ==
Monk was born in Salisbury, Wiltshire and was educated at Queens Road School, Wimbledon and St Marks College, Chelsea where he trained to be a teacher. He was an outstanding all-round amateur sportsman who gained honours at swimming, cricket and athletics (turning out for St Martins Harriers) and was the 1909 Salisbury marathon champion.

== Football career ==
He joined Southampton of the Southern League on amateur terms in the summer of 1910. His teaching commitments prevented him from playing regularly for the "Saints" and he made his debut after seven games of the 1910–11 season, when he took the place of Sam Jepp at centre-half against Crystal Palace on 22 October 1910. When he played, "he used his athleticism to good effect" and was a sure tackler. He managed 19 league appearances, with either Jepp or Billy Beaumont taking his place when he was unavailable. On 11 February 1911, he played as an emergency centre-forward at Swindon Town.

His form attracted the attention of the England amateur selectors and, after a successful trial in January 1911, he won four amateur international caps.

In September 1911, Monk made two appearances for Glossop in the Football League Second Division, followed by brief spells with Fulham and one match back at The Dell (a 2–1 defeat against West Ham United on 6 January 1912).

== Later career ==
In the summer of 1912, his teaching career took him away from Southampton, which brought his brief excursion into professional football to an end.
