= Abbeville Communal Cemetery Extension =

WWI & WWII CWGC cemetery in Somme, France

- Commonwealth War Graves Commission
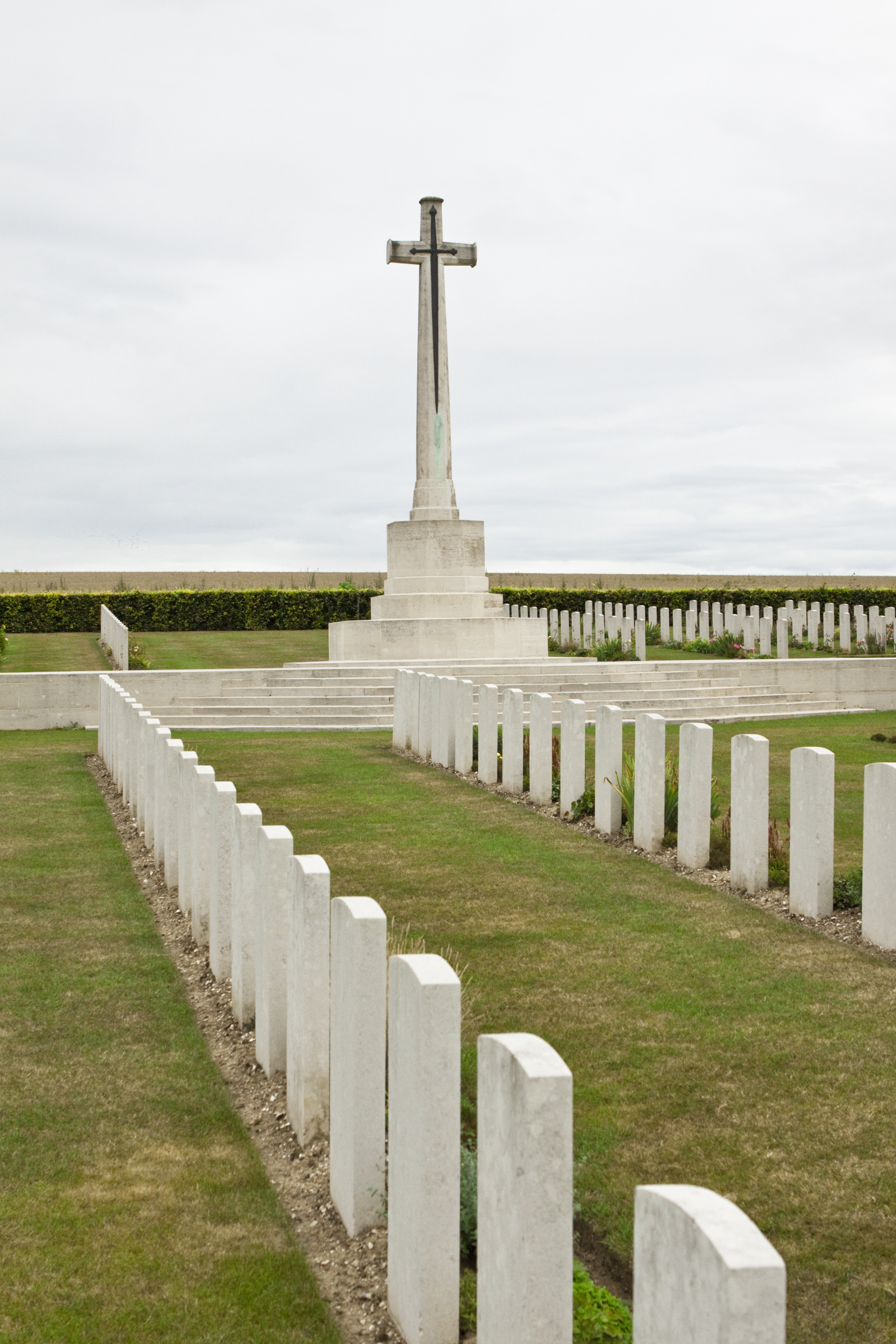
- Used for those deceased 1916–1920; 1940–1945
- Established: 1916
- Location: 50.12141°N 1.83222°E near Abbeville, France
- Designed by: Sir Reginald Blomfield
- Total burials: 2,102
- Unknowns: 107

Burials by nation
- Allied Powers: United Kingdom: 1,601; Australia: 235; Canada: 119; New Zealand: 36; South Africa: 8; Poland: 3; India: 2; Unknown: 107

Burials by war
- First World War: 1,754 Second World War: 348

Abbeville Communal Cemetery Extension is a Commonwealth War Graves Commission burial ground for the dead of the First World War and Second World War located near Abbeville, in the Somme region of France. It is adjacent to the Abbeville Communal Cemetery.

== History ==
The town of Abbeville, positioned near the mouth of the Somme River between Boulogne and Paris, was a major British headquarters and supply hub during the First World War. At various stages of the war, it was also the location of three separate British hospitals which received and treated wounded soldiers. During the Second World War, the town was the site of an aerodrome until it was captured by the Germans in May 1940. It was the scene of further fighting involving the British 51st Division the following month. In the later stages of the German occupation, facilities were built nearby for storage of components for V-1 flying bombs. Thus the area became a target for bombers. Abbeville was retaken by the Polish 1st Armoured Division and Canadian units in September 1944.

== Foundation ==
From November 1914, the existing Abbeville Communal Cemetery was originally used for interments of British military personnel. However, in July 1916, permission was granted from the town authorities to create the Abbeville Communal Cemetery Extension, an addition to the existing cemetery. From September 1916, the Extension was used for burials.

== Cemetery ==
Designed by the English architect Sir Reginald Blomfield and administered by the Commonwealth War Graves Commission, the Abbeville Communal Cemetery Extension is on a slope to the northeast of Abbeville, at the end of Allée Du Souvenir Francais. The Abbeville Communal Cemetery is on the same road, but slightly to the south and lower down on the slope; its northern side forms the south side of the Extension. The entrances to the Extension are along the side shared with the Abbeville Communal Cemetery but it may also be entered from the Allée Du Souvenir Francais. A Cross of Sacrifice is centrally located in the northern portion of the cemetery while a Stone of Remembrance is positioned close to the eastern wall.

There are a total of 2,102 interments in the Extension, with the identities of 107 of them not known. Of the identified burials, 1760 of them are of military personnel of the First World War while 244 are from the Second World War. The majority of the burials are British, but over 200 Australians and more than 100 Canadians are among the interments. Most of the unknown burials date from the Second World War. A notable interment is the Scottish footballer William Gray, a corporal in the Seaforth Highlanders who died of wounds on 18 November 1916. There are also 12 personnel of Queen Mary's Army Auxiliary Corps buried in the cemetery; most were casualties of an air raid that took place on 30 May 1918.
