= James Bowden (footballer) =

English footballer

Personal information
- Full name: James William Bowden
- Date of birth: August 1880
- Place of birth: Wolverhampton, England
- Date of death: 25 May 1951 (aged 70)
- Place of death: Wolverhampton, England
- Height: 5 ft 8 in (1.73 m)
- Position: Centre-half

Youth career
- Yardley Methodists
- Erdington

Senior career*
Years	Team	Apps	(Gls)
–	Handsworth Rovers		
1903–1904	Aston Villa	0	(0)
1904–1906	West Bromwich Albion	8	(0)
1906–1907	Southampton	31	(0)
1907–1909	Grimsby Town	19	(0)
1909–????	Hyde		
????–1916	Stourbridge		
- * Club domestic league appearances and goals

James William Bowden (August 1880 – 25 May 1951) was an English footballer who played at centre-half for various clubs in the 1900s.

== Football career ==
Bowden was born in Wolverhampton and played his early football for various local clubs before joining Aston Villa on amateur terms in January 1903. He failed to make the grade at Villa and never appeared in the first team, before moving to local rivals West Bromwich Albion in June 1904.

At Albion, he had to compete for the No. 5 shirt with Ted Pheasant and only made eight Second Division appearances in the 1904–05 season. As a result of a shooting accident in which a bullet passed through his left arm, he missed the entire 1905–06 season. By the time he was fit to play once more, Pheasant had become established at centre-half and Bowden was transferred to Southampton of the Southern League.

At Southampton, he took over at centre-half from Bert Lee who had left during the close season after six years in which he hardly missed a match. Despite his lack of height, Bowden impressed the Saints' fans with his "stylish neatness when in possession". Bowden missed two months mid-season following an injury (when he was replaced by John Robertson) before returning at the end of January for the rest of the season. He played the last four matches at left-half, with Frank Thorpe taking over at centre-half, following an injury to Bill Gray.

In the summer of 1907, he returned to the Football League Second Division with Grimsby Town, but in two seasons managed only nineteen games for the Mariners before dropping down to non-league football, firstly with Hyde of the Lancashire Combination and then with Stourbridge of the Birmingham & District League.
