= Hodkinson =

Hodkinson is a surname. Notable people with the surname include:

- Joseph Hodkinson (1889–1954), English footballer
- Paul Hodkinson (born 1965), British boxer
- Trent Hodkinson (born 1988), Australian rugby league player
- William Wadsworth Hodkinson (1881–1971), American businessman

== See also ==
- The Hodkinson abbreviated mental test score, used to assess for dementia or confusion
- Hodgkinson
