= Leonard James Keyworth =

Recipient of the Victoria Cross

- Born: 12 August 1893; Lincoln, Lincolnshire, England
- Died: 19 October 1915 (aged 22); Abbeville, France
- Burial place: Abbeville Communal Cemetery
- Military career
- Allegiance: United Kingdom
- Branch: British Army
- Service years: 1914–1915
- Rank: Corporal
- Units: London Regiment
- Conflicts: World War I: Western Front †
- Awards: Victoria Cross; Medal of St. George (2nd Class) (Russia)

Leonard James Keyworth VC (12 August 1893 – 19 October 1915) was an English recipient of the Victoria Cross, the highest and most prestigious award for gallantry in the face of the enemy that can be awarded to British and Commonwealth forces.

== Details ==
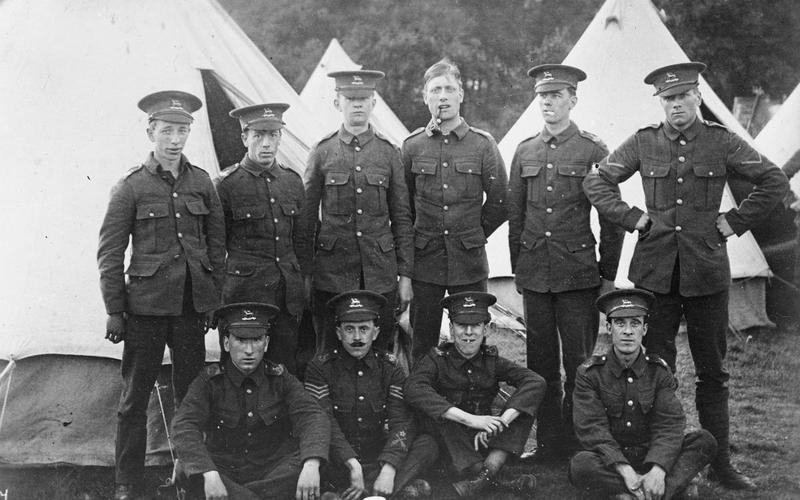
Lance Corporal Leonard James Keyworth VC (third from the left, back row) with a group of men of the "Queen's" at Aldershot Camp. He was 17 years old at that time.

Son of James and Emma Keyworth, of Lincoln. He was a Lance-Corporal in the 24th (County of London) Battalion (The Queen’s), The London Regiment, British Army during the First World War.

On 25/26 May 1915 at Givenchy, France, 21-year-old Keyworth performed an act of bravery for which he was awarded the Victoria Cross. Others involved in that incident were Captain Donald Figg and Private Herbert John Hodgson. Keyworth was also awarded the Medal of St. George (2nd Class) of Russia.

=== Citation ===
For most conspicuous bravery at Givenchy on the night of 25–26th May, 1915. After the assault on the German position by the 24th Battalion, London Regt, efforts were made by that Unit to follow up their success by a bomb attack, during the progress of which 58 men out of a total 75 became casualties. During this very fierce encounter Lance-Cpl Keyworth stood fully exposed for 2 hours on the top of the enemy's parapet, and threw about 150 bombs amongst the Germans, who were only a few yards away.

— London Gazette, 2 July 1915

He later achieved the rank of Corporal, but was killed in action at Abbeville, France, on 19 October 1915. He is buried at Abbeville Communal Cemetery.

== Further information ==
This medal is currently in a private collection.

== Bibliography ==
- Batchelor, Peter; Matson, Christopher (2011). The Western Front 1915. VCs of the First World War. The History Press. ISBN 978-0-7524-6057-4.
- Oldfield, Paul (2015). Victoria Crosses on the Western Front, April 1915 – June 1916. Pen and Sword Books. ISBN 978-1783030439.
