= John Robertson (footballer, born 1884) =

Scottish professional footballer

Personal information
- Full name: John Nicol Robertson
- Date of birth: 1884
- Place of birth: Ochiltree, Scotland
- Date of death: 23 January 1937 (aged 52–53)
- Place of death: Maybole, Scotland
- Height: 5 ft 8 in (1.73 m)
- Position: Half-back

Youth career
- Drogan
- Rangers

Senior career*
Years	Team	Apps	(Gls)
1902–1906	Bolton Wanderers	15	(0)
1906–1912	Southampton	153	(1)
1912–1913	Rangers	14	(0)
- * Club domestic league appearances and goals

John Nicol Robertson (1884 – 23 January 1937) was a Scottish professional footballer who played at half-back for various clubs in the early 20th century, spending most of his career with Southampton.

== Football career ==
Robertson was born in Ochiltree in South Ayrshire and after spending time with Rangers in Glasgow, moved to England in April 1902 to join Bolton Wanderers of the Football League Second Division. At Bolton, he found it hard to break into the first team, making only one appearance at left-half in 1903–04. After three years of reserve team football, he eventually had a more sustained period in the first team, making 14 First Division appearances, generally at right-half, in 1905–06. Frustrated at not being able to command a regular spot in the Wanderers' side, he moved to southern England to join Southampton of the Southern League in May 1906.

Described in the local press as "a really classy half-back and an exceedingly capable player", Robertson made his debut for the "Saints" on 8 September 1906, playing at left-half in a 2–2 draw with Norwich City. After his second appearance a fortnight later, he sustained a serious knee injury which put him out of action for several months. He returned to action on 8 December, taking the place of James Bowden at centre-half for eight matches before switching to right-half for the rest of the season.

Another injury caused him to miss the start of the next season, before he returned at the end of October. He made a total of 25 league and five FA Cup appearances in 1907–08, and as a Utility player appeared in all five defensive positions as well as playing at inside-left against Leyton on 29 February when he scored in a 1–1 draw. In the Cup, he helped Southampton reach the FA Cup Semi-finals where they went out to Wolverhampton Wanderers, beating First Division Everton en route.

In 1908–09, Robertson was in-and-out of the side, alternating with Horace Glover at left-back in the early part of the season before a handful of matches in the latter part of the season at half-back. In the following season, he missed only six matches and played in all five defensive roles, as well as making one appearance up front, this time at outside-left. Injury caused him to miss a large part of the 1910–11 season, but he returned in March at left-half, following the transfer of Bert Trueman to Sheffield United.

Following Glover's departure in September 1911, Robertson made the left-back position his own and his form earned him two call-ups to the Southern League representative XI in which he played the Irish League in Belfast and the Football League XI at Stoke. This season saw his longest period of regular first-team football, when he missed only one match before he was sold to Rangers in March 1912, much to the dismay of the Saints' supporters. In his six seasons at The Dell, Robertson made a total of 164 appearances, scoring once.

Robertson spent only one full season at Ibrox in which he made sixteen appearances at left-back, 12 in the Scottish Football League which concluded with Rangers as champions, plus four in the Glasgow Cup when the Gers defeated local rivals Celtic 3–1 in the final. However, Robertson was injured in that final game and suffered a spinal injury, which left him crippled for 24 years. He died at home in Maybole in 1937 after suffering from a cerebral haemorrhage.

== Honours ==
Rangers

- Scottish Football League: 1912–13
- Glasgow Cup: 1913
