= Abbeville Communal Cemetery =

World War I & II CWGC cemetery in Somme, France

- Commonwealth War Graves Commission
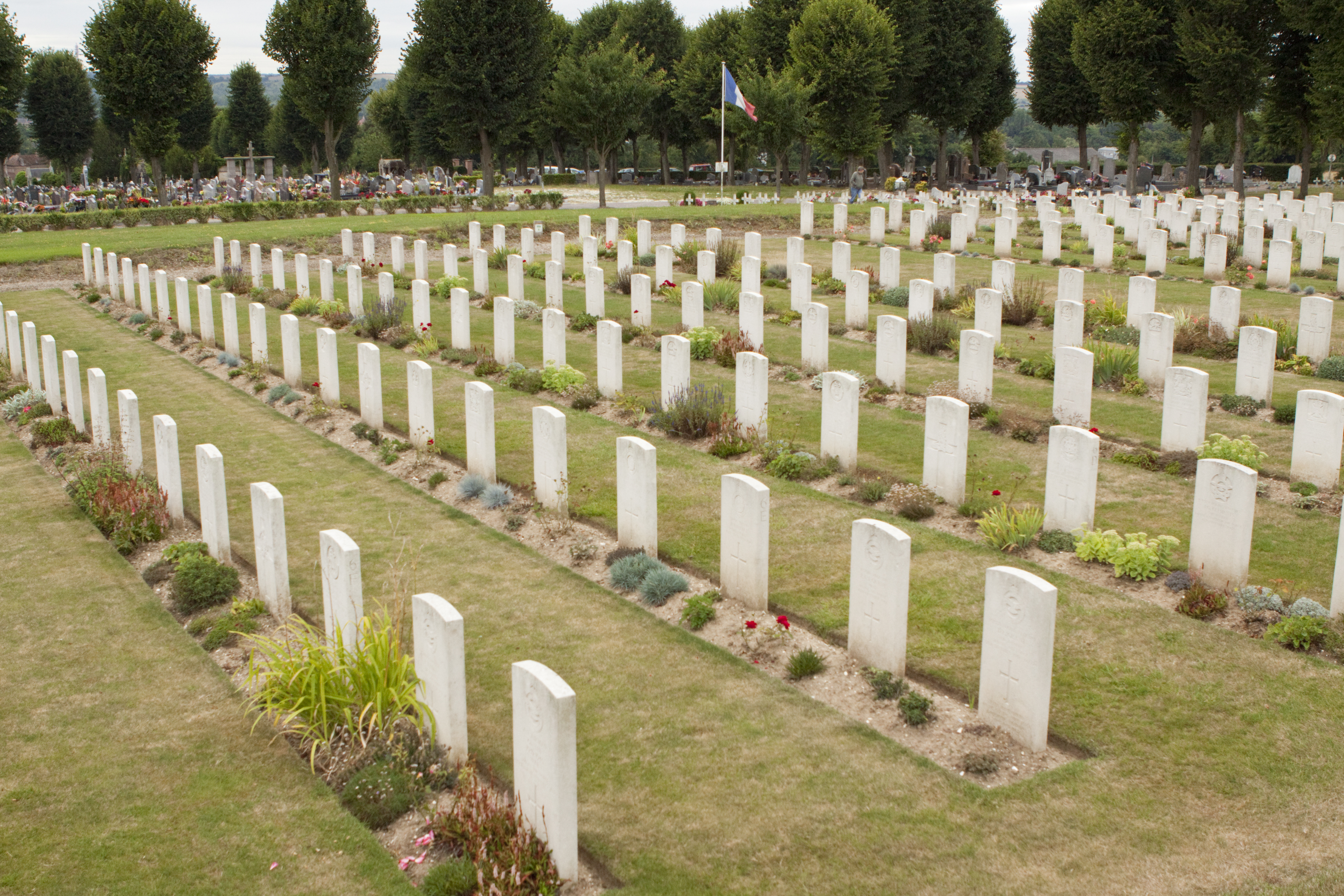
- Used for those deceased 1914–1916; 1940–1943
- Established: 1914
- Location: 50.11773°N 1.83125°E near Abbeville, France
- Designed by: Sir Reginald Blomfield
- Total burials: 804
- Unknowns: 8

Burials by nation
- Allied Powers: United Kingdom: 753; Canada: 15; Australia: 13; South Africa: 10; New Zealand: 3; India: 2; Unknown: 8

Burials by war
- First World War: 774 Second World War: 30

Abbeville Communal Cemetery is a Commonwealth War Graves Commission burial ground for the dead of the First World War and Second World War located near Abbeville, in the Somme department of France. It is adjacent to the Abbeville Communal Cemetery Extension.

== History ==
The town of Abbeville, positioned near the mouth of the Somme River between Boulogne and Paris, was a major British headquarters and supply hub during the First World War. At various stages of the war, it was also the location of three separate British hospitals which received and treated wounded soldiers. During the Second World War, the town was the site of an aerodrome until it was captured by the Germans in May 1940. It was the scene of further fighting involving the British 51st Division the following month. In the later stages of the German occupation, facilities were built nearby for storage of components for V-1 flying bombs. Thus the area became a target for bombers. Abbeville was retaken by the Polish 1st Armoured Division and Canadian units in September 1944.

== Foundation ==
The Abbeville Communal Cemetery was used in November 1914 for interments of British military personnel up until mid-1916. The earliest burials were amongst the existing French military graves already present in the cemetery but later interments were grouped together. In July 1916, permission was granted from the town authorities to create the Abbeville Communal Cemetery Extension, as an addition to the existing cemetery. From September 1916, the Extension was used for burials.

== Cemetery ==
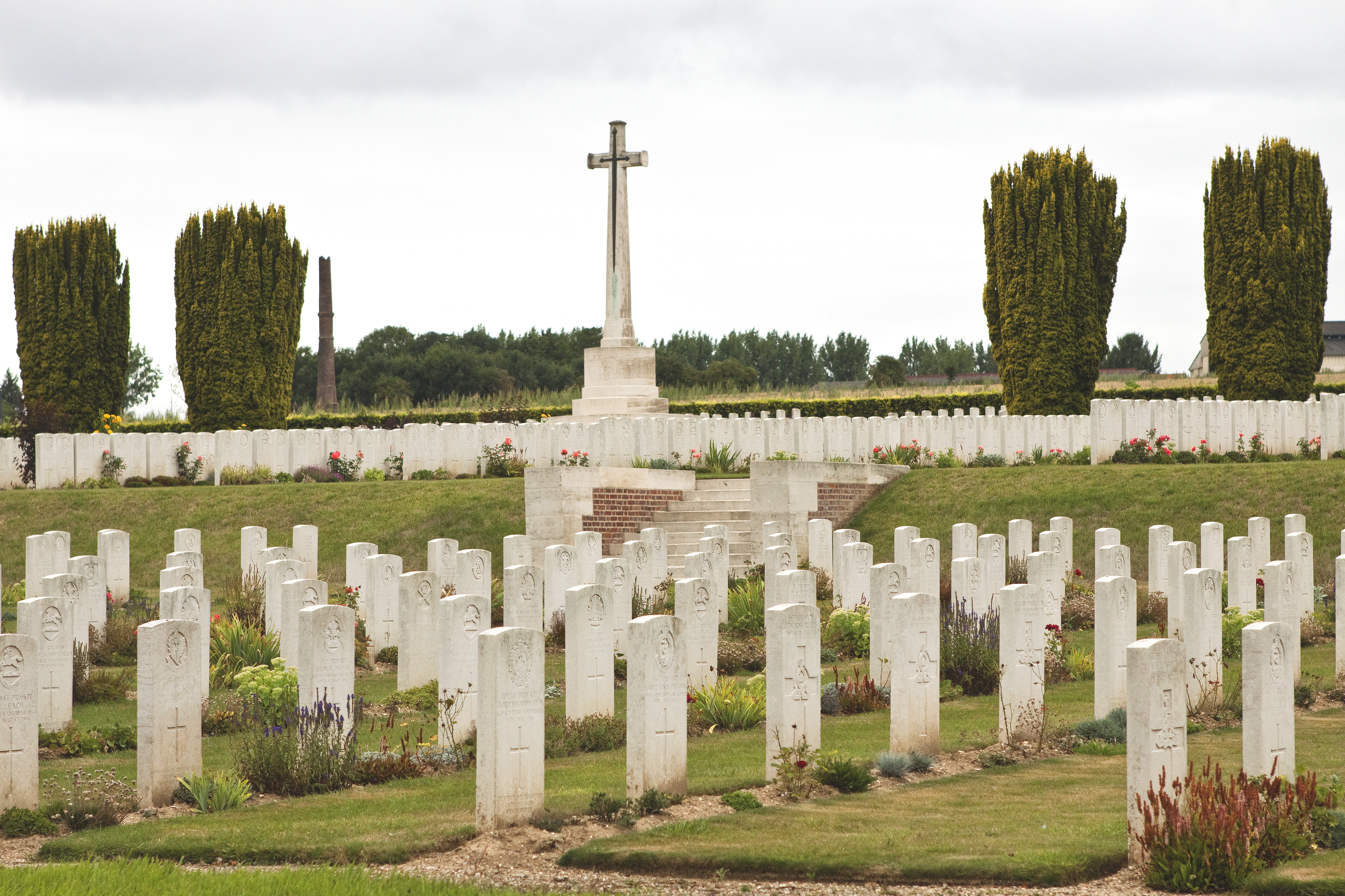
A view of the Abbeville Communal Cemetery, with the Cross of Sacrifice of the adjacent Extension visible in the background

Designed by the English architect Sir Reginald Blomfield and administered by the Commonwealth War Graves Commission, the Abbeville Communal Cemetery is on a slope to the northeast of Abbeville, at the end of Allée Du Souvenir Francais. The Abbeville Communal Cemetery Extension is on the same road, but slightly to the north further up the slope; its southern side forms the north side of the original cemetery.

There are a total of 804 interments in the cemetery, with the identities of eight of them unknown. Of the identified burials, the majority are of military personnel of the First World War while 30 are from the Second World War. Deceased British soldiers of the First World War account for 737 of the interments but Australians, South Africans, Canadians, Indians and a New Zealander who died in the period 1914 to 1916 are buried in the cemetery. Most of the burials from the Second World War are of personnel from the air forces of Britain, Canada, and New Zealand.

A notable interment is Leonard James Keyworth, a corporal in the London Regiment who died of wounds at Abbeville on 10 October 1915. He was a recipient of the Victoria Cross, having been awarded it earlier in the year for an action at Givenchy.
