= Herbert John Hodgson =

English printer

- Born: 2 June 1893; Camberwell, English
- Died: 10 August 1974 (aged 81); London
- Occupation: printer
- Known for: T. E. Lawrence

Herbert John Hodgson (2 June 1893, Camberwell – 10 August 1974, London) is regarded as one of the most skilled printers of the twentieth century. After serving in the First World War, with Roy Manning Pike he printed the rare 1926 subscribers' edition of Seven Pillars of Wisdom by T. E. Lawrence. From 1927 to 1936 he worked at the Gregynog Press for fine books in mid-Wales.

== Service in the First World War ==
Hodgson joined the Territorial Force before the outbreak of war in 1914 and was assigned to the 24th (County of London) Battalion (The Queen’s), The London Regiment. After training he was sent to the front in France. In March 1915 he was in reserve at the battle of Neuve Chapelle. His first front-line engagements were at the battles of Festubert and Givenchy in May 1915. At Givenchy he was part of a group that held a German trench overnight under heavy fire and suffered heavy casualties. Among this group were Lance-Corporal Leonard James Keyworth, who won the Victoria Cross for his role in that engagement, and Captain Donald Figg, who was awarded the Distinguished Service Order for his bravery that night. Hodgson was later involved in the Battle of Loos in September 1915 and the Battle of the Somme in 1916. In 1917 he was slightly injured and he convalesced in England. He married Rebecca Moore in Southwark on 15 September 1917.

Returning to the front he was transferred to the 9th Royal Irish Fusiliers. As a result of a further engagement in April 1918 east of Wulverghem near Messines he fell into a shell hole and found a mud-encrusted book. He stuffed this into his pocket and carried on, but he was knocked out by a shell explosion. When he became conscious he discovered that the book was a Bible. An officer told him to keep it for luck. 92 years later the original owner of the Bible was traced. Suffering from shell-shock, Hodgson was consigned to light duties for the remainder of the war.

== Seven Pillars of Wisdom ==
Trained as a skilled printer, in 1923 Hodgson was contracted by Roy Manning Pike to help print the valuable subscribers' edition of Seven Pillars of Wisdom by T. E. Lawrence. The book had illustrations by Eric Kennington, Augustus John, Paul Nash, Blair Hughes-Stanton and his wife Gertrude Hermes.

== Gregynog Press ==
After completing work on the Seven Pillars in 1926 Hodgson moved in 1927 to the Gregynog Press near Newtown, Powys, which specialised in the production of fine books. He remained there urntil 1936.

In her history of the Gregynog Press, Dorothy A. Harrop reports that Robert Maynard (the Controller of the Press) "came to be of the opinion that Hodgson was probably the best pressman in the country at that time. … Hodgson’s name appears for the first time in the Colophon and his masterly touch is already apparent. … The printing of these…… represents a triumph for Hodgson."

== Return to London ==
Concerned about the employment prospects of his growing family, Hodgson returned to London in 1936. In the London Blitz he lost one of his sisters. His wife died of cancer in 1956. Hodgson continued to work as a printer until he retired in 1963. He died peacefully in 1974, leaving four sons and a daughter.
