= John Hodgkinson (footballer, born 1883) =

English footballer

Personal information
- Full name: John Chapman Hodgkinson
- Date of birth: December 1883
- Place of birth: Stockport, England
- Date of death: 15 June 1915 (aged 31)
- Place of death: near Krithia, Ottoman Turkey
- Positions: Inside left; outside left

Senior career*
Years	Team	Apps	(Gls)
1905–1906	Stockport County	28	(6)
1907–1908	Stockport County	17	(3)
- Haslingden
- Nelson
- Rochdale
1911	Grimsby Town	12	(3)
- * Club domestic league appearances and goals

John Chapman Hodgkinson (December 1883 – 5 June 1915) was an English professional footballer who played as a forward in the Football League for Stockport County and Grimsby Town. He was nicknamed "Cobbler".

== Personal life ==
Hodgkinson served in the British Army as a territorial. He later re-enlisted as a private in the East Lancashire Regiment during the First World War. Hodgkinson served at Gallipoli and was killed in action during an Ottoman counterattack at the Third Battle of Krithia on 5 June 1915. He was originally reported as missing in action, but his status was changed to presumed dead soon after. Hodgkinson's body was never recovered and he is commemorated on the Helles Memorial.

== See also ==
- List of people who disappeared

== Career statistics ==
Appearances and goals by club, season and competition
Club	Season	League			FA Cup		Total	
Club	Season	Division	Apps	Goals	Apps	Goals	Apps	Goals
Stockport County	1904–05	Lancashire Combination First Division	26	6	4	0	30	6
Stockport County	1905–06	Second Division	2	0	0	0	2	0
Stockport County	Total		28	6	4	0	32	6
Stockport County	1907–08	Second Division	7	2	0	0	7	2
Stockport County	1908–09	Second Division	10	1	0	0	10	1
Stockport County	Total		45	9	4	0	49	9
Career total			45	9	4	0	49	9
