= Hodgkinsonite =

Nesosilicate mineral

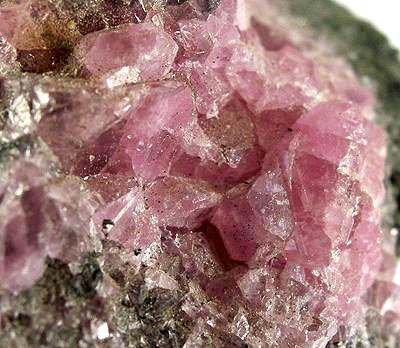
- Hodgkinsonite from Franklin Mine, Franklin, New Jersey USA. The translucent and lustrous crystals reach 8 mm and the main crystal here is doubly terminated.

General
- Category: Nesosilicate
- Formula: Zn_{2}MnSiO_{4}(OH)_{2}
- IMA symbol: Hgk
- Strunz classification: 9.AE.20
- Crystal system: Monoclinic
- Crystal class: Prismatic (2/m) (same H-M symbol)
- Space group: P2_{1}/a
- Unit cell: a = 11.76, b = 5.31 c = 8.18 [Å]; β = 95.42°, Z = 4

Identification
- Mohs scale hardness: 4 1/2 - 5
- Optical properties: Biaxial (-)
- Refractive index: n_{α} = 1.720 n_{β} = 1.741 n_{γ} = 1.746
- Birefringence: δ = 0.026
- Dispersion: r < v moderate

Hodgkinsonite is a rare zinc manganese silicate mineral Zn_{2}MnSiO_{4}(OH)_{2}. It crystallizes in the monoclinic system and typically forms radiating to acicular prismatic crystals with variable color from pink, yellow-red to deep red. Hodgkinsonite was discovered in 1913 by H. H. Hodgkinson, for whom it is named in Franklin, New Jersey, and it is only found in that area.
