= Bob Pollock =

Scottish footballer

Personal information
- Full name: Robert Pollock
- Date of birth: 1 June 1880
- Place of birth: Wishaw, Scotland
- Position: Wing-half

Senior career*
Years	Team	Apps	(Gls)
1896–1897	Wishaw Thistle		
1897	Third Lanark		
1897	Wishaw Thistle		
1898–1899	Bristol City		
1900–1901	Kettering		
1901–1902	Notts County	0	(0)
1902–1909	Leicester Fosse	211	(14)
1910	Leyton		
1910	Leicester Imperial		
Total		211	(14)
- * Club domestic league appearances and goals

Robert Pollock (1 June 1880–unknown) was a Scottish footballer who played in the Football League for Leicester Fosse.
