= Bert Hodgkinson (footballer, born 1903) =

English footballer

Personal information
- Full name: Herbert Hodgkinson
- Date of birth: 1 December 1903
- Place of birth: Penistone, England
- Date of death: 1974 (aged 70–71)
- Position: Centre half

Youth career
- Penistone Juniors

Senior career*
Years	Team	Apps	(Gls)
1923–1929	Barnsley	200	(0)
1930–1931	Tottenham Hotspur	56	(?)
	Colwyn Bay	?	(?)
1933–1934	Crewe Alexandra	46	(2)
- * Club domestic league appearances and goals

Herbert Hodgkinson (26 December 1903 – 1974) was a professional footballer who played for Penistone Juniors, Barnsley, Tottenham Hotspur, Colwyn Bay and Crewe Alexandra.

== Football career ==
Hodgkinson began his playing career with his local youth team Penistone Juniors. In 1923 the left back joined Barnsley where he featured in 200 matches between 1923 and 1929. He signed for Tottenham Hotspur in 1930 to go on and make a further 58 appearances in all competitions. After leaving White Hart Lane Hodgkinson played for Colwyn Bay United before joining Crewe Alexandra where he ended his football career.
