= Bill Gray (footballer) =

Scottish footballer

Personal information
- Full name: William John Gray
- Date of birth: 5 March 1882
- Place of birth: Inverness, Scotland
- Date of death: 18 November 1916 (aged 34)
- Place of death: Somme, France
- Height: 5 ft 9 in (1.75 m)
- Position: Left half

Youth career
- Inverness Thistle

Senior career*
Years	Team	Apps	(Gls)
1900–1906	Partick Thistle	39	(3)
1906–1907	Southampton	28	(0)
1907–1909	Partick Thistle	47	(4)
- * Club domestic league appearances and goals

William John Gray (5 March 1882 – 18 November 1916) was a Scottish professional footballer who played at left half for Partick Thistle and Southampton.

== Football career ==
Gray was born in Inverness and began his youth career with local club Inverness Thistle. He started his professional career with Partick Thistle. After five years, he moved to southern England to join Southampton of the Southern League to replace Kelly Houlker who had returned to Blackburn Rovers.

Gray made his "Saints" debut in the opening match of the 1906–07 season and his form meant that he rarely missed a match until an injury sustained in a 5–1 defeat at Reading in March brought his season to a premature end, with James Bowden eventually replacing him.

Apparently unhappy in the south of England, Gray returned to Scotland in the summer of 1907 to resume his career with Partick Thistle.

== Personal life ==
Gray served as a corporal in the Seaforth Highlanders during the First World War and died in France on 18 November 1916. He is buried in Abbeville Communal Cemetery Extension.
