= Albert Hodgkinson =

British Army soldier

- Born: 29 June 1895; Middlesbrough, Yorkshire, England
- Died: 26 November 1975 (aged 80); Adelaide, South Australia
- Military career
- Allegiance: United Kingdom
- Branch: 21st Division British Army
- Service years: 1915–1918
- Rank: Lance Corporal
- Units: 12th Battalion, Northumberland Fusiliers
- Conflicts: First World War: Western Front
- Awards: Distinguished Conduct Medal

,

Albert Hodgkinson (1895–1975) was an English recipient of the Distinguished Conduct Medal for conspicuous gallantry and tenacity during the First World War.

== Early life ==
Hodgkinson was born in Middlesbrough, England to Thomas and Annie Hodgkinson. He worked, like his father and brother Thomas, for the steel manufacturer Dorman Long.

== First World War ==
=== Enlistment ===
Hodgkinson and his brother enlisted with the Northumberland Fusiliers, 12th Battalion, which was formed as part of Kitchener's New Army, the 21st Division and took part in all of the major engagements of the British Army on the Western Front in France and Flanders, where they also participated in the famous and unofficial Christmas truce of 1915

=== Distinguished Conduct Medal ===
Private, later Lance Corporal, Hodgkinson won his medal in an unknown attack on an unknown front at an unknown date of the War, all details of his citation being destroyed during The Blitz on London during the Second World War. However, the London Gazette citation survives, and reads : "14265 Private A. Hodgkinson, 12th Battalion, Northumberland Fusiliers. For conspicuous gallantry and tenacity during a successful raid on the enemy's trenches, when in command of half a squad of grenadiers." According to his brother Thomas, serving in the same regiment, "Bert and his section were sent on a routine patrol to harass the enemy and take a prisoner. This involved crossing no-mans land dropping into the German trench causing havoc and returning, what they didn't know was that the Germans were in the middle of a change-over, so there were twice as many in the trench as they expected. Somehow they drove the enemy along a communication trench. Albert then stood at the entrance of the communication trench and pelted them with hand grenades as if he was throwing cricket balls They made their escape, but on arriving at their own lines they found that they were a man short, Albert went back, on his own, found him wounded and carried him to safety.

== Later life ==
Hodgkinson and his wife and family migrated to Adelaide, South Australia in 1926 where he worked as a blacksmith for the farm machinery manufacturer Horwood-Bagshaw.
