= John Hodgkinson (cricketer) =

Australian cricketer

Personal information
- Born: 7 February 1873; Sydney, Australia
- Died: 19 November 1939 (aged 66); Burwood, New South Wales, Australia
- Source: ESPNcricinfo, 31 December 2016

John Hodgkinson (7 February 1873 – 19 November 1939) was an Australian cricketer. He played three first-class matches for New South Wales between 1908/09 and 1909/10.

== See also ==
- List of New South Wales representative cricketers
