= Harry Hodgkinson (footballer) =

English footballer

Personal information
- Full name: Henry Thomas Hodgkinson
- Date of birth: March 1862
- Place of birth: Burslem, England
- Date of death: 11 October 1945 (age 83)
- Place of death: Ipstones, England
- Position: Half-back

Senior career*
Years	Team	Apps	(Gls)
1879–1888	Port Vale	110	(11)
Total		110	(11)
- * Club domestic league appearances and goals

Henry Thomas Hodgkinson (March 1862 – 11 October 1945) was an English footballer who was one of Port Vale's first players.

== Career ==
Hodgkinson was one of Port Vale's original players when it was founded in the 1870s. The first recorded game he played was a friendly on 27 October 1883, which was lost 4–1 at home to Preston North End. He appeared regularly in the team and helped the club win the Burslem Challenge Cup and share the North Staffordshire Charity Challenge Cup in 1885. He also helped the club reach the FA Cup fifth round in 1886 eventually Vale pulled out of the replay against Brentwood. He lost his first-team spot in September 1887 and was forced to retire through injury in 1888.

== Career statistics ==
Appearances and goals by club, season and competition
Club	Season	FA Cup		Other		Total	
Club	Season	Apps	Goals	Apps	Goals	Apps	Goals
Burslem Port Vale	1882–83	0	0	0	0	0	0
Burslem Port Vale	1883–84	0	0	9	0	9	0
Burslem Port Vale	1884–85	0	0	28	5	28	5
Burslem Port Vale	1885–86	5	0	31	4	36	4
Burslem Port Vale	1886–87	3	0	27	0	30	0
Burslem Port Vale	1887–88	0	0	7	2	7	2
Total		8	0	102	11	110	11

== Honours ==
Port Vale

- Burslem Challenge Cup: 1885
- North Staffordshire Charity Challenge Cup: 1885 (shared)
