= John Lewis (footballer, born 1881) =

Welsh footballer (1881–1954)

Personal information
- Full name: John Richard Lewis
- Date of birth: August 1881
- Place of birth: Aberystwyth, Wales
- Date of death: 12 September 1954 (aged 73)
- Place of death: Burton upon Trent, England
- Height: 5 ft 8 in (1.73 m)
- Position: Inside forward

Senior career*
Years	Team	Apps	(Gls)
1899–1900	Bristol Rovers	25	(5)
1900–1901	Portsmouth	21	(7)
1901–1904	Burton United	74	(24)
1904–1906	Bristol Rovers	56	(25)
1906–1907	Brighton & Hove Albion	32	(8)
1907–1908	Southampton	24	(10)
1908–1909	Croydon Common	10	(14)
1909–1910	Burton United		

International career
1906	Wales	1	(0)
- * Club domestic league appearances and goals

For people with the same name see John Lewis (disambiguation)

John Richard Lewis (August 1881 – 12 September 1954) was a Welsh international footballer, who played his club football as a forward for various clubs in the south of England.

== Playing career ==
Lewis was born in Aberystwyth and started his career with Bristol Rovers in September 1899, before moving to the South coast to join Southern League Portsmouth in May 1900. After one season at Fratton Park, he moved to the Midlands to join Burton United playing in the Second Division of the Football League.

After three seasons, he returned to the Southern League with Bristol Rovers in August 1904 where he won a cap for Wales in the match against England on 19 March 1906. Shortly afterwards he moved back to the south coast with Brighton & Hove Albion, where he spent one season before arriving at Southampton, his third south coast club.

Although rather small, Lewis was a clever forward but sometimes found his size a handicap against burly opponents. In his one season at The Dell, he formed a useful partnership with Fred Harrison as well as linking up well with fellow forwards, Frank Jefferis and George Smith. He made 24 Southern League appearances for The Saints and his 10 goals made him top scorer for the club in the 1907–08 league season.

Never able to settle long in one place, he spent the 1908–09 season with Croydon Common before returning to Burton United (now out of the Football League) in 1909.
