= Arthur Hughes (English footballer) =

English footballer

Personal information
- Full name: Arthur Hughes
- Date of birth: January qtr. 1883
- Place of birth: Birkenhead, England
- Date of death: 18 December 1962 (aged 79)
- Place of death: Birkenhead, England
- Height: 5 ft 9 in (1.75 m)
- Position: Centre forward

Youth career
- Birkenhead

Senior career*
Years	Team	Apps	(Gls)
- Tranmere Rovers
1907–1908	Bolton Wanderers	0	(0)
1908–1909	Southampton	21	(15)
1909	Manchester City	0	(0)
- * Club domestic league appearances and goals

Arthur Hughes (1883 – 18 December 1962) was an English professional footballer who played as a forward for various clubs in the 1900s.

== Playing career ==
Born in Birkenhead, he started his career with his local club Birkenhead F.C. before joining Tranmere Rovers. In May 1907, he moved to Bolton Wanderers for a season (in which he failed to make a first team appearance) before moving to the south coast to join Southern League Southampton in the summer of 1908.

He was recruited by Southampton to act as cover for George Smith, but shortly after the move Smith collapsed and died in July. Hughes immediately took Smith's place on a pre-season tour of Europe. For Hughes the tour was a great success, scoring freely including a hat-trick against The Hague.

Hughes started the 1908–09 season as centre-forward in spectacular fashion with ten goals in his first ten games, including a hat-trick in the 6–0 defeat of Luton Town on 12 September 1908. According to Holley & Chalk's "The Alphabet of the Saints" Hughes had "fine ball control" and "equally happy using either foot...he distributed the ball with panache". A serious leg injury sustained in the match at Watford on 21 November (in which he scored the only goal) sidelined him for several matches. Although he returned to first team action in January he was unable to regain his early season form but still finished the season as the club's top scorer with 15 goals from 21 appearances.

At the end of the season he decided to return to Lancashire where he signed for Manchester City although he never made an appearance for their first team.

After retiring from football, he took up employment as a bricklayer working for the Birkenhead municipal corporation.
