= George Smith (footballer, born 1879) =

English footballer

Personal information
- Date of birth: 12 July 1879
- Place of birth: Preston, England
- Date of death: 3 July 1908 (aged 28)
- Place of death: Southampton, England
- Positions: Half back; inside forward

Youth career
- Leyland

Senior career*
Years	Team	Apps	(Gls)
1899–1901	Preston North End	28	(1)
1901–1902	Aston Villa	5	(0)
1902–1903	New Brompton	30	(10)
1903–1906	Blackburn Rovers	58	(4)
1906–1907	Plymouth Argyle	41	(6)
1907–1908	Southampton	21	(5)
- * Club domestic league appearances and goals

George Smith (12 July 1879 – 3 July 1908) was an English professional footballer who played for several clubs at the beginning of the 20th century.

== Playing career ==
Smith was born in Preston and played his youth football with Leyland. In July 1899 he started his professional career playing as a half-back at Preston North End where he stayed for two seasons. At the end of his second season, Preston were relegated from the First Division.

He then spent part of the 1901–02 season at Aston Villa before moving to non-league New Brompton In 1903 he joined Blackburn Rovers where he stayed for three years, before joining Plymouth Argyle.

In the summer of 1907 he signed for Southampton of the Southern League, where he was converted into an inside forward, playing alongside Frank Jefferis, John Bainbridge and John Lewis. As a forward he was prone to over-elaboration but had a powerful shot. He made 21 league appearances, scoring five goals, and also played in all six FA Cup matches as Saints reached the semi-finals, losing to Wolverhampton Wanderers who went on to take the cup in the final.

Smith suddenly collapsed and died, shortly before his 29th birthday in July 1908.
