= John Bainbridge (footballer) =

English footballer

Personal information
- Full name: John Robert Bainbridge
- Date of birth: 1880
- Place of birth: Seaham, England
- Date of death: 17 January 1960 (aged 79)
- Place of death: Sunderland, England
- Height: 5 ft 11 in (1.80 m)
- Position: Forward

Youth career
- Silksworth
- Sunderland Royal Rovers

Senior career*
Years	Team	Apps	(Gls)
1903–1904	Glossop		
1904–1906	Reading		
1906–1907	Portsmouth	25	(4)
1907–1910	Southampton	84	(20)
1910–1911	Hartlepools United		
- * Club domestic league appearances and goals

John Robert Bainbridge (1880 – 17 January 1960) was an English professional footballer who played as a forward for three Southern League clubs between 1903 and 1910.

== Football career ==
Bainbridge started his footballing career in the North East with Silksworth and Sunderland Royal Rovers, before turning professional with Glossop in May 1903.

In the summer of 1904 he moved South to join Reading where he spent two seasons before joining Portsmouth in 1906. After a season at Portsmouth, he moved along the South coast to join Southampton in May 1907.

According to Holley & Chalk's The Alphabet of the Saints, Bainbridge was "a reliable performer. His right-wing partnership with Frank Jefferis drew favourable comparisons with the famed duo of Wood and Turner seven years earlier".

In Saints' FA Cup run in 1908, in which they reached the semi-finals, he scored 4 goals in 6 games. Ill health ended his career at The Dell and he returned to his native North-East where, after playing briefly for Hartlepools United, he returned to his original occupation as coal-miner.
