= Jeremy Wilson =

Jeremy Michael Wilson (1944 – 2 April 2017) was a British historian, biographer, writer, editor, and fine-press publisher. He was also a business copywriter and editor working for major corporations.

== Biography ==
Wilson was born in Cambridge. He held an MA degree from Balliol College Oxford University in Philosophy, Politics and Economics. His MSc was in International Relations from the London School of Economics and Political Science. He married Nicole Helari, and they have three grown children.

Wilson became acknowledged as the leading authority on T. E. Lawrence, and was the author of Lawrence of Arabia: The Authorised Biography of T. E. Lawrence (1989).

Wilson's first published work on Lawrence was an edition in 1971 of Lawrence's commonplace book, Minorities; Good Poems by Small Poets and Small Poems by Good Poets; of which his well-researched introduction gives readers an understanding of how the poems reflected Lawrence's life and thoughts. In 1975, as a result of the success of Minorities, A. W. Lawrence appointed Wilson to be the authorised biographer of T. E. Lawrence. Wilson spent years of research, accumulating considerably more information about Lawrence than had been published before.

To make information about Lawrence freely available worldwide, Wilson developed T. E. Lawrence Studies, a website and online discussion list. Since 1990 through Castle Hill Press he and his wife have edited and published scholarly editions of Lawrence's works and correspondence and works about Lawrence's life.

Wilson was consultant to the National Portrait Gallery for their Lawrence of Arabia Centenary Exhibition (1988-1989) and compiled the exhibition catalogue. He was one of the two historical advisers in 2005-2006 to the Imperial War Museum for the exhibition "T. E. Lawrence, the life, the legend".

Wilson gave numerous papers on Lawrence, including "T. E. Lawrence and the capture of Akaba" (Australian War Memorial, Canberra, December 2007); "Victoria Ocampo, T. E. Lawrence's most extraordinary biographer" (Huntington Library, San Marino, California, October 2007); "Lawrence at Sea" (Imperial War Museum, London, May 2007); "T. E. Lawrence at Carchemish and after: one man in successive contexts" (Lee University, Cleveland, Tennessee, April 2006); "Lawrence of Arabia or Smith in the Desert" (Imperial War Museum, London, March 2006); T. E. Lawrence in Dorset (Tank Museum, Bovington, October 2005).

He died on 2 April 2017 at the age of 72.
