= Frank Jefferis =

English footballer (1884-1938)

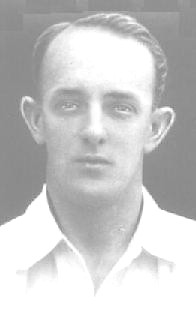

Personal information
- Date of birth: 3 July 1884
- Place of birth: Fordingbridge, England
- Date of death: 21 May 1938 (aged 53)
- Place of death: New Cross, England
- Height: 5 ft 8 in (1.73 m)
- Position: Inside right

Youth career
- Fordingbridge Turks

Senior career*
Years	Team	Apps	(Gls)
1905–1911	Southampton	170	(48)
1911–1920	Everton	125	(22)
1920–1922	Preston North End	79	(12)
1922–1923	Southport	52	(6)
1925–1926	Preston North End	0	(0)
1926	Southport	2	(1)

International career
1912	England	2	(0)
- * Club domestic league appearances and goals

Frank Jefferis (3 July 1884 – 21 May 1938) was an English footballer.

== Playing career ==
=== Early career ===
He initially played football for his local non-league team, Fordingbridge Turks, before being invited for a trial at The Dell by Southampton of the Southern League in March 1905. During his trial period he scored two hat-tricks, prompting The Saints to quickly sign him up, paying Fordingbridge Turks a donation of £5.

=== Southampton ===
He made his debut for the "Saints" in a 1–1 draw against New Brompton on 18 November 1905, taking over from Jimmy Soye at inside-right. At Southampton he linked up well with the other forwards, George Smith, John Bainbridge and John Lewis, as well as showing deft touches on the ball. In 1907–08 he played in all six FA Cup matches as The Saints reached the semi-finals, losing to Wolverhampton Wanderers who went on to take the cup in the final. His best seasons were 1908–09 and 1909–10, in each of which he scored 13 goals. His form dropped slightly the following season, but before the season was over he was transferred to Everton in March 1911 for a fee of £1,500.

=== Everton ===
While at Everton he won two England caps in 1912, and later helped the team win the 1914–15 League championship. His career at Everton was interrupted by World War I, but he continued to play for them after the cessation of hostilities.

=== Later career ===
He later played for Preston North End and Southport before finishing his career as a trainer with Millwall, where he collapsed and died at their training ground in May 1938.

== Honours ==
Everton

- Football League First Division: 1914–15

Preston North End

- FA Cup runner-up: 1921–22
