= John Johnston (footballer, born 1878) =

Scottish footballer (1876–1955)

Personal information
- Full name: John Shand Johnston
- Date of birth: 12 July 1876
- Place of birth: Lennoxtown, Stirlingshire, Scotland
- Date of death: 31 December 1955 (aged 79)
- Height: 5 ft 8 in (1.73 m)
- Position: Wing half

Senior career*
Years	Team	Apps	(Gls)
1898–1901	Stalybridge Rovers		
1901–1907	Bury	180	(2)
1907–1911	Southampton	110	(2)
1911–1915	Stalybridge Celtic		

Managerial career
- 1911–1915: Stalybridge Celtic
- * Club domestic league appearances and goals

John Shand Johnston (12 July 1876 – 31 December 1955) was a Scottish footballer who played as a wing half and won the FA Cup with Bury in 1903.

== Playing career ==
Johnston was born in Lennoxtown, Stirlingshire and started his career with Stalybridge Rovers before joining Football League First Division Bury in May 1901, shortly followed by his former Stalybridge team-mate, centre-half Frank Thorpe. He remained with Bury for six seasons making 180 league appearances, scoring twice. He also appeared in all of Bury's matches in the FA Cup in 1902–03, reaching the final where they defeated Derby County in one of the most one-sided finals ever played. Bury's 6–0 victory still stands as the record Final win. Bury also equalled another record, winning the Cup without conceding a goal in any round.

In May 1907 he moved, along with Bert Hodgkinson, to the south coast to join Southern League Southampton, where he was once again re-united with Frank Thorpe, who had joined the "Saints" from Plymouth Argyle a few weeks earlier. In his first season at The Dell he made 33 Southern League appearances and helped the "Saints" to reach the FA Cup Semi Finals where they went out to Wolverhampton Wanderers, beating First Division Everton en route. He remained with Southampton for four seasons during which the team struggled in a vain attempt to regain their former success. Johnston was a "distinct individual; through all the heat and bustle of the game he was never seen without a blade of grass or some convenient substitute protruding from his mouth." He had a strange gait but was a natural leader and tended to coach the forwards while the game was in progress.

In 1911 he moved back to Stalybridge, this time to join Stalybridge Celtic as player-manager, taking with him Southampton's top-scorer in 1910–11, Martin Dunne. He guided Stalybridge to success in the Lancashire Combination and into the Southern League in 1914.

== Honours ==
=== As a player ===
Bury

- FA Cup winner: 1903
