= William Hodgkinson (footballer) =

English footballer

Personal information
- Full name: William Henry Hodgkinson
- Date of birth: 1882
- Place of birth: Measham, England
- Date of death: 7 March 1908 (aged 26)
- Place of death: Derby, England
- Position: Centre forward

Senior career*
| Years | Team | Apps | (Gls) |
| 1900–1901 | Hinckley Town | | |
| 1901–1902 | Derby County | 0 | (0) |
| 1902–1903 | Hinckley Town | | |
| 1903–1904 | Derby County | 16 | (9) |
| Total | | 16 | (9) |
- * Club domestic league appearances and goals

William Henry Hodgkinson (1882 – 7 March 1908) was an English footballer who played in the Football League for Derby County.

Hodgkinson's career was ended by the onset of tuberculosis, and he died in 1908, aged only 26. The newspaper account of his death stated: "He was a forward of the dashing type, and was a good marksman. He last appeared with the County about three years ago, his career being brought to a premature end through consumption. Though the disease was for a time arrested by a visit to a Southern Sanatorium, Hodgkinson was unable to shake it off, and for some months was too feeble to leave his bed. He, however, bore his illness with great patience...."
