= South Coast derby =

Football rivalry

- Typical Portsmouth and Southampton kits
- Other names: Hampshire derby
- Location: Hampshire
- First meeting: 6 September 1899; Friendly; Portsmouth 2–0 Southampton
- Latest meeting: 11 October 2026; EFL Championship; Southampton 1–0 Portsmouth
- Next meeting: 28 February 2027; EFL Championship; Portsmouth v Southampton
- Stadiums: Fratton Park; St Mary's Stadium

Statistics
- Total meetings: 74
- All-time series: Southampton: 36; Drawn: 17; Portsmouth: 21
- Largest victory: Southampton 5–1 Portsmouth (FA Cup, 13 January 1906); Portsmouth 5–1 Southampton (18 October 1919); Southampton 5–1 Portsmouth (27 August 1960); Southampton 4–0 Portsmouth (27 September 1975); Portsmouth 0–4 Southampton (EFL Cup, 24 September 2019)
- Longest win streak: 6 matches Southampton (1966–1984)
- Longest unbeaten streak: 10 matches Southampton (1964–1987)

In English football, the South Coast derby is the local derby between two clubs on the south coast – Portsmouth and Southampton, first contested in 1899. The fixture has also been referred to as the Hampshire derby. Portsmouth play at Fratton Park whilst Southampton play at St Mary's Stadium. Both clubs are located in Hampshire, England.

Historically the most successful clubs on the south coast of England, Portsmouth and Southampton have played 74 times in "First Class" competitions. Southampton have won 36 fixtures whilst Portsmouth have won 21 fixtures. 17 fixtures have ended in draws. The derby has been played infrequently during some decades due to the two clubs being in separate divisions. As of the 2026–27 season, both clubs currently compete in the EFL Championship.

Portsmouth have been champions of England twice in 1948–49 and 1949–50, and have won the FA Cup twice in 1939 and 2008. Southampton have won the FA Cup once in 1976. In total, Portsmouth have won twelve trophies to Southampton's four, and are one of only five clubs to have won every division in the Football League. Portsmouth have played 33 season in the top flight, whilst Southampton have played 47 seasons in the top flight.

== History ==
Side-by-side comparison of Southampton and Portsmouth final league positions 1921 to the present. The two sides have rarely shared a division, hence the relatively low number of derbies played.

=== Early years (1885–1960) ===
Southampton were originally formed in 1885 as St. Mary's Young Men's Association FC, before adopting the name Southampton St. Mary's when the club joined the Southern League in 1894. After they won the Southern League title in 1896–97, the club became a limited company and changed their name to Southampton FC. Portsmouth was founded in April 1898 and joined the Southern League in 1899.

The first match between the two clubs came in a friendly at Portsmouth's Fratton Park ground on 6 September 1899. The match was won "on their merits" 2–0 by Portsmouth, with goals from Dan Cunliffe (formerly with Liverpool) and Harry Clarke (formerly with Everton).

Southampton and Portsmouth first played each other in the Southern League in April 1900, with Portsmouth winning 2–0 twice in three days. The teams met regularly in the Southern League, and in the early years of the 20th century were rivals for the league title.

During the pre-Football League era, both teams enjoyed title success, with Southampton winning the Southern League on six occasions (1897, 1898, 1899, 1901, 1903 and 1904). Portsmouth won two Southern League titles (1902 and 1920) and three Western League titles (1901, 1902 and 1903).

The first of five South Coast derbies in the FA Cup took place on 13 January 1906. Because of the large crowd expected for the first FA Cup meeting between the two rivals, the local registrars in both towns postponed voting in the 1906 general election until the following week. The match at The Dell was attended by a capacity crowd of 14,000 and the Portsmouth fans, together with their players, did their best to unsettle the inexperienced Southampton goalkeeper, Bill Stead, who was making only his second first team appearance. Stead, however, showed few signs of nerves and produced a "phlegmatic performance", restricting Portsmouth to a single goal from Dan Cunliffe, while the Saints scored five and eventually progressed to the last eight, where they lost 3–0 at Liverpool.

For the 1920–21 season, both teams were admitted to the third division of the Football League (together with the majority of the Southern League First Division sides). The first Football League game between the two clubs was on 11 September 1920, with Southampton winning 2–0. After two seasons in the Third Division, Southampton were promoted as champions in 1922. Portsmouth joined them in the Second Division in 1924 and were promoted to the First Division in 1927, becoming the first southern club outside of London to reach the top tier of English football. Up to this time the teams had met ten times in the Football League, with Saints winning four, Pompey three and three draws.

From 1927 until 1960 Portsmouth enjoyed a much superior league position to their neighbours, winning the FA Cup in 1939 and back-to-back League titles in 1948–49 and 1949–50.

=== Second Division era and change in fortunes (1960–1976) ===
In 1960, when Southampton gained promotion back to the Second Division, Portsmouth having been relegated from the First Division the previous season. The first match in all Competitions since 1927 did not end well for Portsmouth who were on the wrong end of a 5–1 scoreline at The Dell. Both teams enjoyed derbies for eight consecutive seasons while both were in the Second Division.

It would not be until 1974–75 that the two would meet in the league again when Southampton were relegated from the First Division the previous season. A notable victory for Southampton included the 1–0 win on 6 April 1976 which is to date the last league victory for Southampton at Fratton Park. There were changes in fortune for both football clubs. Portsmouth, on a decline, lost a fifth consecutive derby match against Southampton in a period from 1966 to 1976. Southampton, then in the Second Division, were on the rise and won a shock victory in the 1976 FA Cup final against First Division Manchester United 1–0 at Wembley Stadium. The goal was scored by Portsmouth-born Bobby Stokes.

=== Sporadic meetings (1976–2003) ===
Fratton Park, home of Portsmouth F.C.

In 1978, Southampton were promoted back to the First Division, with the clubs meeting only once, in the FA Cup in 1984, before Portsmouth returned to the top flight.

In 1987, Portsmouth gained promotion to First Division which ensured that the South Coast derbies would return for the first time in the league since 1976. A notable victory for Portsmouth coming in a 2–0 win at The Dell in an otherwise forgettable return to top flight football during the 1987–88 First Division season. During the period from 1988 to 2003 the derby only happened once in the form of an FA Cup match at The Dell in 1996.

=== Premier League era (2003–2005) ===
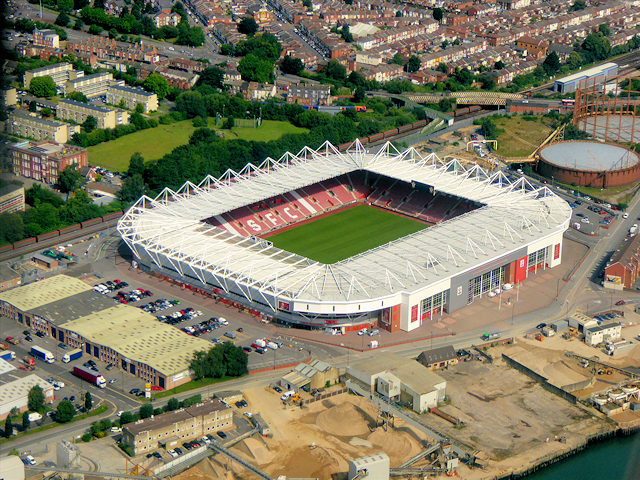
St Mary's Stadium, home of Southampton F.C. since 2001

Portsmouth were crowned champions of Division One in 2003 which signaled not only Premiership and a return to the top flight but it reignited the clubs' rivalry – the first time the two teams had met in regular league competition since the 1987–88 First Division season. Both teams had a home victory in a brief return of derby games during the 2003–04 and 2004–05 seasons.

The rivalry was galvanised with the appointment of Harry Redknapp as Southampton manager in December 2004, just days after he had resigned as manager of Portsmouth, and less than a month after the Saints had beaten Portsmouth at St Mary's Stadium. The following month, the Saints were drawn against and defeated their rivals in a fiery FA Cup match, with former Portsmouth striker Peter Crouch (who would go on to rejoin Portsmouth in 2008) scoring the decisive penalty in the last minute of the match.

However, Portsmouth struck back in the next league encounter between the rivals, with Portsmouth registering a 4–1 win at Fratton Park, which was their second biggest after the 1919 5–1 victory. It turned out to be Redknapp's only return to the ground with the club. On 15 May 2005, Portsmouth lost 2–0 away to relegation threatened West Bromwich Albion. Portsmouth's loss earned West Bromwich Albion three points and survival to end one place above the relegation zone. However, this result also affected and confirmed bottom-placed Southampton's relegation to the second tier of English football for the first time since 1978. Redknapp caused more controversy when he left Southampton and returned to Portsmouth later in 2005 and enjoyed success.

The acrimonious departure of Harry Redknapp from Portsmouth to Southampton and then back to Portsmouth brought the bitter rivalry between the two clubs to a new level. The two clubs' chairmen at the time, Rupert Lowe (Southampton) and Milan Mandarić (Portsmouth), publicly criticised one another on a number of occasions, with Lowe calling for an inquest into irregular betting patterns in the run-up to Redknapp's re-appointment. Mandarić had even sent a boxed duck as a Christmas "gift" to Lowe (as Lowe had been on a hunting trip when the "ordeal" began), but the gesture only furthered the animosity between the two.

=== Changing fortunes (2005–2025) ===
Following Southampton's relegation from the Premier League, Portsmouth held the higher league position for the first time since 1960. Portsmouth won the FA Cup again in 2008 under Redknapp, whilst in 2009, Southampton were again relegated, this time to League One. The two sides met in an FA Cup match at St Mary's in 2010 which Portsmouth came out 4–1 victors and went on to reach the FA Cup final that season. Despite reaching the final, due to financial problems and subsequently being placed into administration, Portsmouth were docked nine points by the Premier League and were in turn relegated to the Championship for the 2010–11 season. Southampton secured promotion to the Championship on the final day of the season after beating Walsall 3–1, meaning both clubs would face each other in the league the following season.

The matches played during the 2011–12 season both ended as draws, but the club's fortunes differed considerably, with Southampton gaining promotion to the Premier League and Portsmouth once again going into administration and being relegated to League One. Portsmouth suffered relegation again down to League Two in the 2012–13 season. Portsmouth were promoted back to League One in 2017, and the Championship in 2024. During this period, Southampton qualified for the Europa League in 2015 and 2016, reached the 2017 EFL Cup final, played in the Premier League from 2012 to 2023, and were promoted back to the Premier League in the 2024 EFL Championship play-off final.

The only meeting between the two clubs from the 2012–13 season until the 2025–26 season came in September 2019, when Southampton were drawn against Portsmouth in the EFL Cup at Fratton Park. Southampton won the game 4–0.

=== EFL Championship era (2025–present) ===
Southampton had a disastrous 2024–25 season, recording only two league victories and becoming the earliest team to be relegated from the Premier League. Meanwhile, Portsmouth secured their Championship status, setting up the first league South Coast derby in 13 years during the 2025–26 season. The first meeting, held at St Mary's Stadium on 14 September 2025, ended in a goalless draw. The reverse fixture at Fratton Park on 25 January 2026 ended in a 1–1 draw, with Léo Scienza opening the scoring for Southampton before Ebou Adams equalised for Portsmouth.

The following season, Southampton defeated Portsmouth 1–0 at St Mary's Stadium on 11 October 2026, with James Bree scoring the only goal of the match. Southampton played the second half with ten men following the dismissal of Cameron Bragg. The result marked Southampton's first league victory over Portsmouth since November 2004, ending a run of four consecutive draws between the clubs.

== Inter-fan rivalry and hooliganism ==
During the early days, after winning the 1939 FA Cup final, Portsmouth paraded the trophy around The Dell and Southampton Guild Hall, with the majority of Southampton fans being thrilled for their neighbours. It wasn’t until the 1960s and 1970s when the two clubs started meeting more frequently that the rivalry between the fanbases began to intensify. Since 2012, a "bubble" travel system has been used by Hampshire Police to prevent violent disorder, and has been used in all matches between the two clubs with the exception of a 2019 EFL Cup fixture.

In 1984, an FA Cup clash between the two saw Southampton beat Portsmouth 1–0 at Fratton Park in injury time. During the match, Southampton's Mark Dennis was hit by a coin from the crowd and then Steve Williams was slapped as he made his way to the players lounge.

Following a league clash in March 2004 at Fratton Park, violence broke out after Portsmouth fans attempted to stop Southampton fans from leaving the ground, with the police coming under attack. 93 people were arrested, with 64 receiving banning orders and some jailed.

Twelve fans were jailed for violent disorder after bricks, bottles and chairs were thrown outside St Mary's Stadium following Portsmouth's 4–1 victory in the FA Cup.

In 2015, 10,000 Portsmouth residents signed a petition against Portsmouth City Council's decision to allow airline Emirates to use its red and white livery (Southampton colours) for its sponsorship of the Spinnaker Tower in Portsmouth. The city council subsequently came to an agreement with sponsors Emirates to use blue and gold (Portsmouth colours) instead, donating the now-unnecessary red paint to local charities instead.

In 2019, the two teams met for the first time in over seven years, an EFL Cup tie at Fratton Park. Tensions at the game ran high, and as such police presence was high; hundreds of police officers were brought in from multiple police forces across Hampshire in order to prevent violence between the two sets of fans in what has been described as the biggest football policing operation conducted in Hampshire. The police worked for over an hour separating fans in order to prevent a brawl as Southampton fans made their way from Fratton railway station to Fratton Park. Despite the best efforts of the police, violence and anti-social behaviour ensued; before the game, red and blue flares were set off near Fratton station and the Shepherd's Crook pub respectively. Following the 0–4 result, tensions increased as items were thrown towards police and a police horse was punched. Seven men were subsequently jailed for violent disorder.

Dozens of fans were given banning orders after disorder following the full time whistle on 25 January 2026 which ended in a 1–1 draw. Fans threw bottles and chairs, ripped out seats and used broken debris as missiles. Southampton forward Léo Scienza claimed he was spat at by a supporter as he went to retrieve the ball and was pulled at various points during the match. Hampshire Police said 21 people appeared in court over offences related to both league matches in the 2025–26 season.

A police officer suffered a minor injury following Southampton's 1–0 victory at St Mary's on 11 October 2026, with fans from both sides pulling down fencing in an attempt to reach each other. Riot police and officers on horseback moved to disperse the crowds. Four people were arrested, and Hampshire police launched an investigation into the disorder.

== Nicknames ==
Portsmouth supporters refer to Southampton supporters as "Scum" or "Scummers". According to Portsmouth fans, the term "scum" developed out of acronym standing for "Southampton City (or Corporation) Union Men", although this has been debunked as a myth. Another theory is that Portsmouth look down on Southampton as "scum" because that is a naval term for merchant seamen. It most likely comes from common usage of the word used by football supporters everywhere.

Southampton supporters have taken to referring to their local rivals as "Skates", after a Southampton fanzine, The Ugly Inside, asked its readers in 1988 to suggest an abusive term most likely to cause offence to Portsmouth supporters. This date coincides with Portsmouth's return to the First Division in its 1987–88 season, when both clubs occupied the same division for the first time since 1976. The name "Skate" originates from the civilian population of Portsmouth, and was originally an insult directed towards sailors working on ships in HMNB Portsmouth, or who were otherwise associated with the Royal Navy. Sailors on long voyages would go long periods without female company, so would use skate to relieve themselves sexually; this led to sailors who attempted to approach prostitutes in Portsmouth being refused and told "I ain't no skate bait, mate".

== Statistics ==
"First class" competitions only

As of 11 October 2026

Competition	Played	Results			Goals	
Competition	Played	Southampton	Portsmouth	Draw	Southampton	Portsmouth
Southern League	32	15	12	5	43	43
Football League	31	13	6	12	52	37
Premier League	4	2	2	0	6	6
FA Cup	5	4	1	0	12	6
League Cup	2	2	0	0	6	0
Total	74	36	21	17	119	92

== All-time results ==
=== League ===
Southampton vs Portsmouth

Date	Venue	Score	Competition
11 September 1920	The Dell	5–1	Third Division
25 March 1922	The Dell	1–1	Third Division South
27 September 1924	The Dell	0–0	Second Division
5 September 1925	The Dell	1–3	Second Division
15 January 1927	The Dell	0–2	Second Division
27 August 1960	The Dell	5–1	Second Division
2 March 1963	The Dell	4–2	Second Division
8 February 1964	The Dell	2–3	Second Division
16 January 1965	The Dell	2–2	Second Division
28 August 1965	The Dell	2–2	Second Division
14 September 1974	The Dell	2–1	Second Division
17 April 1975	The Dell	4–0	Second Division
3 January 1988	The Dell	0–2	First Division
21 December 2003	St Mary's	3–0	Premier League
13 November 2004	St Mary's	2–1	Premier League
7 April 2012	St Mary's	2–2	Championship
14 September 2025	St Mary's	0–0	Championship
11 October 2026	St Mary's	1–0	Championship

Southampton wins	Draws	Portsmouth wins
8	6	4

Portsmouth vs Southampton

Date	Venue	Score	Competition
18 September 1920	Fratton Park	0–1	Third Division
18 March 1922	Fratton Park	0–2	Third Division South
29 November 1924	Fratton Park	1–1	Second Division
16 January 1926	Fratton Park	1–2	Second Division
28 August 1926	Fratton Park	3–1	Second Division
31 December 1960	Fratton Park	1–1	Second Division
13 October 1962	Fratton Park	1–1	Second Division
28 September 1963	Fratton Park	2–0	Second Division
12 September 1964	Fratton Park	0–3	Second Division
5 February 1966	Fratton Park	2–5	Second Division
26 December 1974	Fratton Park	1–2	Second Division
6 April 1976	Fratton Park	0–1	Second Division
22 August 1987	Fratton Park	2–2	First Division
21 March 2004	Fratton Park	1–0	Premier League
24 April 2005	Fratton Park	4–1	Premier League
18 December 2011	Fratton Park	1–1	Championship
25 January 2026	Fratton Park	1–1	Championship
28 February 2027	Fratton Park		Championship

Portsmouth wins	Draws	Southampton wins
4	6	7

=== Cup tournaments ===
Date	Score	Winner	Competition	Venue
13 January 1906	5–1	Southampton	FA Cup	The Dell
20 January 1984	0–1	Southampton	FA Cup	Fratton Park
7 January 1996	3–0	Southampton	FA Cup	The Dell
2 December 2003	2–0	Southampton	League Cup	St Mary's
29 January 2005	2–1	Southampton	FA Cup	St Mary's
13 February 2010	1–4	Portsmouth	FA Cup	St Mary's
24 September 2019	0–4	Southampton	League Cup	Fratton Park

== Players who have played for both clubs ==
As of 4 January 2026

Player	Portsmouth career			Southampton career		
Player	Span	League Appearances	League Goals	Span	League Appearances	League Goals
Matt Reilly	1899–1904	138	0	1895	2	0
Arthur Chadwick	1901–1904	43	9	1897–1901	81	6
John Lewis	1900–1901	21	7	1907–1908	24	10
C. B. Fry	1902–1903	2	0	1900–1902	16	0
George Molyneux	1905–1906	23	0	1900–1905	142	0
Alex McDonald	1902–1903	7	7	1901	5	5
Tommy Bowman	1904–1909	85	3	1901–1904	88	2
Kelly Houlker	1902–1903	23	1	1903–1906	59	3
Isaac Tomlinson	1906–1907	5	0	1905–1906	29	8
Jack Warner	1906–1915	227	10	1905–1906	17	0
John Bainbridge	1906–1907	25	4	1907–1910	84	20
Alex Glen	1907–1908	7	1	1906–1907	29	10
Ernest Williams	1906–1909	32	5	1912	1	0
Arthur Charles Brown	1907–1910	9	0	1906–1907; 1910–1912	0; 39	0; 0
Edward Bell	1911–1912	4	0	1906–1908	4	0
Billy Beaumont	1907–1910	70	2	1910–1911	27	0
Jerry Mackie	1920–1928	278	78	1928–1931	81	24
Robert Blyth	1921–1922	8	2	1922–1923	8	0
Ted Hough	1931–1932	1	0	1921–1931	175	0
Willie Haines	1922–1928	164	119	1928–1932	70	47
Johnny McIlwaine	1928–1930	56	5	1930–1932; 1933–1937	46; 81	9; 9
Bill Rochford	1931–1946	138	1	1946–1950	128	0
Bill Kennedy	1932–1933	1	0	1936–1938	43	0
Mervyn Gill	1953–1955	6	0	1955–1956	1	0
Harry Penk	1955–1957	9	2	1960–1964	52	6
Ron Davies	1973–1974	59	18	1966–1972	240	134
Mick Channon	1985–1986	34	6	1966–1977; 1979–1982	391; 119	157; 28
Bobby Stokes	1977–1978	24	2	1968–1977	216	40
Steve Middleton	1977–1978	26	0	1969–1970	24	0
Paul Gilchrist	1977–1978	39	3	1972–1977	107	17
Malcolm Waldron	1984–1986	23	1	1974–1983	178	10
Trevor Hebberd	1991	4	0	1976–1982	97	7
Ivan Golac	1985	8	0	1978–1983; 1984–1985	144; 24	4; 0
George Lawrence	1993	12	0	1980–1982; 1985–1987	10; 70	1; 11
Eamonn Collins	1986–1989	5	0	1981–1983	3	0
Ian Baird	1987–1988	20	1	1982–1985	22	5
Jon Gittens	1993–1996	83	1	1985–1987; 1991–1992	18; 19	0; 0
Colin Clarke	1990–1993	85	18	1986–1989	82	36
Barry Horne	1987–1989	70	7	1989–1992	112	6
Andy Cook	1987–1991	16	1	1997–1998	9	0
John Beresford	1989–1992	108	8	1998–2000	17	0
Alan McLoughlin	1992–1999	309	54	1990–1992	24	1
Matthew Robinson	1998–2000	69	1	1993–1998	14	0
Dave Beasant	2001–2002	27	0	1993–1997	88	0
Eyal Berkovic	2004–2005	22	2	1996–1997	28	4
Scott Hiley	1999–2002	75	0	1998–1999	32	0
Nigel Quashie	2000–2005	148	13	2005–2006	37	5
Peter Crouch	2001–2002 2008–2009	37 38	18 11	2004–2005	27	12
Vincent Péricard	2002–2006	44	9	2008	5	0
Ricardo Fuller	2004–2005	31	1	2005–2006	31	9
Martin Cranie	2007–2009	2	0	2004–2007	16	0
Jhon Viáfara	2005–2006	14	1	2006–2008	76	5
Grégory Vignal	2005–2006	14	0	2007–2008	20	3
David Connolly	2012–2015	38	11	2009–2012	61	14
Gavin Bazunu	2021–2022	44	0	2022–2026	92	0

== Managed both clubs ==
- Alan Ball
- Harry Redknapp

== Played for one, managed/coached the other ==
- Alan Ball
- Kevin Bond
- Arthur Chadwick
- Jimmy Easson
- Stuart Gray
- Joe Jordan
- Steve Wigley
- Harry Wood

== Women's football ==
Both Portsmouth and Southampton have women's counterparts. Southampton Saints L.F.C. had the better history, affiliating to Southampton and taking on the club name in 1995, maintaining membership of the FA Women's Premier League National Division from 1998 to 2003 and finishing runners-up in the Women's FA Cup in 1998–99 before Southampton's men side relegation from the Premier League in 2005 saw their affiliation end. Portsmouth F.C. Women were formed in 1987.

Former Southampton player and manager Vanessa Raynbird, who spent 21 years with the club, was appointed director of football by Portsmouth FC Ladies.

In 2017, Southampton formed a women's section, Southampton F.C. Women. In summer 2021, Southampton FC Women were awarded upward club movement to the third-tier FA Women's National League Southern Premier Division, of which Portsmouth FC Women were long-serving members, meaning the 2021–22 season saw the resumption of the South Coast Women's Derby.

Southampton FC Women were promoted to the FA Women's Championship (now WSL2) in May 2022, whilst Portsmouth FC Women were promoted to the FA Women's Championship in April 2024. After two seasons in the WSL2, Portsmouth FC Women were relegated to the National League Southern Premier Division.

== Major honours won by the clubs ==
Honours	Portsmouth	Southampton
Football League First Division / Premier League (first tier)	Champions (1948–49, 1949–50)	Runners-up (1983–84)
Football League Second Division / Football League First Division (second tier)	Champions (2002–03)	Runners-up (1966, 1978, 2012)
Football League Third Division (South) / Football League Third Division (third tier)	Champions (1924, 1962, 1983, 2024)	Champions (1922, 1960)
Football League Fourth Division (fourth tier)	Champions (2016–17)	—
FA Cup	Winners (1939, 2008)	Winners (1976)
EFL Cup	—	Runners-up (1979, 2017)
FA Community Shield	Winners (1949 (shared)); Runners-up (2008))	Runners-up (1976)
Southern League	Champions (1902, 1920); Runners-up (1900, 1907)	Champions (1897, 1898, 1899, 1901, 1903, 1904)
Western Football League	Champions (1901, 1902, 1903); Runners-up (1908)	Champions (1908); Runners-up (1904, 1906, 1909)
EFL Trophy	Winners (2019)	Winners (2010)

== Bibliography ==
- Farmery, Colin (2004). Seventeen Miles from Paradise: Saints v Pompey – Passion, Pride and Prejudice. Desert Island Books. ISBN 978-1874287896.
- Holley, Duncan; Chalk, Gary (1992). The Alphabet of the Saints. ACL & Polar Publishing. ISBN 0-9514862-3-3.
- Juson, Dave (2004). Saints v Pompey – A history of unrelenting rivalry. Hagiology Publishing. ISBN 0-9534474-5-6.
