= Walter Arnold =

Walter Arnold may refer to:

- Walter Arnold (GC) (1906–1988), Royal Air Force airman and recipient of the George Cross
- Walter Arnold (German sculptor) (1909–1979)
- Walter Arnold (footballer) (1876–1955), English footballer
- Walter S. Arnold, American sculptor and stone carver
- Walt Arnold (Walter Henslee Arnold; born 1958), American football player

== See also ==
- Walter Yarnold (1893–1978), English cricketer
