= List of Old Etonians in the armed services =

This is a list of Old Etonians (former pupils of Eton College) who are notable because of their time in any of the armed services, whether those of the United Kingdom and its predecessor states (England, Scotland, Ireland and Great Britain), or of other countries of the British Empire and Commonwealth such as Australia, New Zealand, and British India, or of foreign countries.

The College has a distinguished record of military service, having produced 37 Victoria Cross holders (more than any other school) and 12 service chiefs (also more than any other school).

== Recipients of the Victoria Cross ==
Thirty-seven Old Etonians have been awarded the Victoria Cross, and the conflicts in which they performed those acts range from the Crimean War to the Falklands War. There have also been four Old Etonians eligible for the George Cross, although one of those eligible did not convert his Empire Gallantry Medal to a George Cross.

- Crimean War
  - Lieutenant-General Lord Henry Percy, (1817–1877)
  - Lieutenant-Colonel Sir Charles Russell, (1826–1883) politician
  - Gerald Goodlake, (1832–1890)
  - Robert James Loyd-Lindsay, 1st Baron Wantage, (1832–1901), politician
- Indian Mutiny
  - Lieutenant-General Sir Charles Fraser, (1829–1895)
  - Clement Walker Heneage, (1831–1901)
  - Field Marshal Frederick Sleigh Roberts, 1st Earl Roberts, (1832–1914), Commander-in-Chief, Madras, 1881–1885, India, 1885–1893, Ireland, 1895–1899, and South Africa, 1899–1900, Commander-in-Chief, 1901–1904,
- Umbeyla Expedition
  - George Fosbery (1832–1907), firearms expert
- Zulu War
  - General Sir Redvers Buller, (1839–1908), Adjutant General, 1890–1897, General Officer Commanding Natal, 1899–1900, and I Corps, 1901–1906,
  - Lord William Beresford, (1847–1900)
- Sudan Campaign
  - Admiral of the Fleet Sir Arthur Knyvet Wilson, (1842–1921), Third Sea Lord, 1897–1901, Flag Officer Commanding Channel Squadron, 1901–1908, and Home Fleet, 1903–1907, First Sea Lord, 1909–1912
  - William Edwards, (1855–1912)
  - Brigadier General Alexander Hore-Ruthven, 1st Earl of Gowrie, (1872–1955), Governor of South Australia, 1928–1934, and New South Wales, 1935–1936, Governor-General of Australia, 1936–1944.
- Malakand Campaign
  - Alexander Murray, 8th Earl of Dunmore, (1871–1962)
- Boer War
  - Charles FitzClarence, (1865–1914)
  - Frederick Roberts, (1872–1899)
- Somaliland Campaign
  - Major-General Sir John Gough, (1871–1915)
- First World War
  - Brigadier-General John Campbell, (1876–1944)
  - George Boyd-Rochfort, (1880–1940)
  - Francis Grenfell, (1880–1915)
  - Arthur Batten-Pooll, (1891–1971),
  - William Congreve, (1891–1916)
  - Reginald Graham, (1892–1980)
  - John Dunville, (1896–1917)
  - Julian Royds Gribble, (1897–1918)
  - Lieutenant-Colonel Lewis Pugh Evans, (1881–1962)
  - Lieutenant-Colonel Arthur Borton, (1883–1933)
  - Lieutenant-Colonel Neville Elliott-Cooper, (1889–1918)
  - Lieutenant Geoffrey Drummond, RNVR (1886–1941)
  - Captain Percy Hansen, (1890–1951)
- North West Frontier
  - Godfrey Meynell, (1904–1935)
- Second World War
  - William Sidney, 1st Viscount De L'Isle, (1909–1991)
  - Christopher Furness, (1912–1940)
  - Charles Anthony Lyell, 2nd Baron Lyell, (1913–1943)
  - Geoffrey Keyes, (1917–1941)
  - David Jamieson, (1920–2001)
- Falklands War
  - H. Jones, (1940–1982)

== Recipients of the George Cross ==
- Squadron Leader G. C. N. Close RAF
- Cadet D.G.M. Hay RNR (later 12th Marquess of Tweeddale)
- Squadron Leader A. H. H. Tollemache, R.Aux.A.F.

Eligible but did not convert Empire Gallantry Medal

- Flying Officer G. R. Branch, RAF

== Service Chiefs ==
Portrait	Name	Took office	Left office	Position
General Sir Mark Carleton Smith	General Sir Mark Carleton Smith	2018	2022	Chief of the General Staff
Admiral Sir Benjamin Bathurst	Admiral Sir Benjamin Bathurst	1993	1995	First Sea Lord
Field Marshal Edwin Bramall, Lord Bramall	Field Marshal Edwin Bramall, Lord Bramall	1982 (as CDS)	1985	Chief of the General Staff and Chief of the Defence Staff
General Sir Roland Gibbs	General Sir Roland Gibbs	1976	1979	Chief of the General Staff
Field Marshal Rudolph Lambart, 10th Earl of Cavan	Field Marshal Rudolph Lambart, 10th Earl of Cavan	1922	1926	Chief of the Imperial General Staff
Admiral of the Fleet Sir Arthur Wilson	Admiral of the Fleet Sir Arthur Wilson	1910	1911	First Sea Lord
General Sir Neville Lyttelton	General Sir Neville Lyttelton	1904	1908	Chief of the General Staff
Field Marshal Frederick Roberts, 1st Earl Roberts	Field Marshal Frederick Roberts, 1st Earl Roberts	1901	1904	Commander-in-Chief of the Forces
Field Marshal Arthur Wellesley, 1st Duke of Wellington	Field Marshal Arthur Wellesley, 1st Duke of Wellington	1842 (Earlier term 1827-8)	1852 (died in office)	Commander-in-Chief of the Forces
Field Marshal Henry Seymour Conway	Field Marshal Henry Seymour Conway	1782	1793	Commander-in-Chief of the Forces
Lieutenant General John Manners, Marquess of Granby	Lieutenant General John Manners, Marquess of Granby	1766	1770	Commander-in-Chief of the Forces
Admiral of the Fleet Richard Howe, 1st Earl Howe	Admiral of the Fleet Richard Howe, 1st Earl Howe	1763	1765	First Sea Lord

== Indian Army ==
- Paramasiva Prabhakar Kumaramangalam, Chief of Staff of the Indian Army (1967–1970)
