= William McKechnie =

William McKechnie may refer to:

- William Sharp McKechnie, Scottish scholar and historian
- William Neil McKechnie, Royal Air Force officer
- Bill McKechnie, American baseball player, manager and coach
- Liam McKechnie (William Martin McKechnie), Irish judge
