= Hugh Constantine =

Royal Air Force Air Chief Marshal (1908-1992)

Sir Hugh Constantine
- Born: 23 May 1908; Southsea, Hampshire
- Died: 16 April 1992 (aged 83)
- Military career
- Allegiance: United Kingdom
- Branch: Royal Air Force
- Service years: 1926–1964
- Rank: Air Chief Marshal
- Nickname: Connie
- Commands: Imperial Defence College (1961–64); Flying Training Command (1959–61); No. 25 (Training) Group (1954–56); No. 5 (Bomber) Group (1945); RAF Elsham Wolds (1941–42); No. 214 Squadron (1939)
- Conflicts: Second World War
- Awards: Knight Commander of the Order of the British Empire; Companion of the Order of the Bath; Distinguished Service Order; Mentioned in Despatches (5); Commander's Cross of the Order of Polonia Restituta (Poland)

Air Chief Marshal Sir Hugh Alex Constantine, KBE, CB, DSO (23 May 1908 – 16 April 1992) was a Royal Air Force officer who became Air Officer Commanding-in-Chief of Flying Training Command.

== RAF career ==
Educated at Christ's Hospital, Constantine joined the Royal Air Force as a cadet in 1926, and was posted to No. 56 Squadron at RAF North Weald in December 1927. On 10 December 1928, Constantine's Siskin fighter aircraft crashed into the Thames Estuary off Leysdown, leaving him in a state of collapse. He was rescued by Flying Officer Walter Anderson and Corporal Thomas McTeague, who were awarded the Empire Gallantry Medal, exchanged for the George Cross in 1940. In 1934, as a flight lieutenant, Constantine took command of Number 3 Section of No.1 Armoured Car Company RAF.

Constantine served in the Second World War, initially as officer commanding No. 214 Squadron and then as station commander at RAF Elsham Wolds. He continued his war service as senior air staff officer at Headquarters No. 1 Group in 1942, as deputy senior air staff officer at Headquarters RAF Bomber Command in 1943 and as air officer commanding No. 5 Group in 1945. In this capacity he worked closely with Barnes Wallis and used Grand Slam bombs and Tallboy bombs against key industrial targets in Germany.

After the war, Constantine became chief intelligence officer with the Control Commission in Germany and was then appointed senior air staff officer at Headquarters No. 205 Group. He went on to be director of intelligence (operations) at the Air Ministry in 1951, Air Officer Administration at Headquarters RAF Fighter Command in 1952 and air officer commanding No. 25 (Training) Group in 1954. His final posts were as deputy chief of staff, plans & policy at Headquarters Supreme Headquarters Allied Powers Europe in 1956, air officer commanding-in-chief of Flying Training Command in 1959 and Commandant of the Imperial Defence College in 1961 before retiring in 1964.

In retirement Constantine was granted an honorary Doctor of Laws from the University of Warwick.

== Family ==
In 1937 Constantine married Helen; they had one daughter.

Military offices
Preceded by Sir Robert Scott	Commandant of the Imperial Defence College; 1961–1964	Succeeded by Sir Deric Holland-Martin
Preceded by Sir Richard Atcherley	Air Officer Commanding-in-Chief Flying Training Command; 1959–1961	Succeeded by Sir Augustus Walker
Preceded by Sir Ralph Cochrane	Air Officer Commanding No. 5 (Bomber) Group; 1945	Group disbanded
