= McTeague (disambiguation) =

McTeague is an 1899 novel by Frank Norris.

== People ==
- Dan McTeague (born 1962), Canadian politician, Member of Parliament
- Dave McTeague (born 1952), American Democratic politician
- Thomas McTeague (1893–1961), Northern Irish recipient of the George Cross

== Films and stage works ==
- McTeague (film), 1916 silent film based on the Norris novel
- McTeague (opera), 1992 opera based on the Norris novel
- Toby McTeague, a 1986 Canadian children's film

== See also ==
- McTigue (disambiguation)
- McTeigue (disambiguation)
