= McTigue =

McTigue is a surname. Notable people with the surname include:

- Brian McTigue (1930–1981), English rugby league footballer
- Maurice McTigue (born 1940), New Zealand politician
- Mike McTigue (1892–1966), Irish boxer
- Tom McTigue (born 1959), American actor and comedian

== See also ==
- McTeague (disambiguation)
- McTeigue
