= Theodore Bogdanovitch =

Theodore Bogdanovitch GC (1 April 1900 – 20 April 1956) was a recipient of the Empire Gallantry Medal later converted into the George Cross for his actions in 1939 during the Arab revolt in Palestine.

Born in Strumica (nowadays located in North Macedonia), he served with the Serbian Army in World War I where he was wounded. He joined with British forces as part of the Serbian Guard and later joined the Palestine Gendarmerie. After the force was split, he joined the Transjordan Frontier Force. In June 1939 he was awarded the Empire Gallantry Medal (Military Division) for his actions in an Arab revolt in 1939. The full citation states:

Mülazım Theodore Bogdanovitch, Trans-Jordan Frontier Force. On the 11th March 1939, this officer was in charge of a mechanised troop despatched from Irbid to the Zemal area, to locate a reported armed band. Mulazim Bogdanovitch succeeded in finding the band, and "pinned" it in a Wadi, until the arrival of air and land reinforcements. He then, though under heavy fire, displayed outstanding powers of leadership in advancing to the attack under cover of his skilfully disposed light machine guns. When Mr. Macadam was killed, he took charge of the situation, and gallantly led his men down the side of the steep Wadi, inflicting many casualties on the band, and driving the remainder on to the reinforcing troops. His dogged determination to defeat the band, his complete contempt of personal danger, and the tactical skill he displayed, were an inspiration to his men, and contributed in no small measure to the success of the action. This officer has, on many other occasions, displayed outstanding qualities of leadership and loyalty.

Bogdanovitch's Empire Gallantry Medal was exchanged for the George Cross after that award was instituted in September 1940.

He became a naturalized British citizen in October 1944, and retired from the Transjordan Frontier Force in 1947. He then moved to Cyprus where he took a security job in a mining company. On 20 April 1956, during the Cyprus Emergency, he was shot dead by EOKA gunmen.

After his death, Bogdanovitch's medals – including the George Cross– were donated to the Gordon Highlanders Museum in Aberdeen by his executors, as he had been working closely with that regiment as part of his work duties at the time of his death.
