= Dorothy Louise Thomas =

British nurse (1905–1989)

- Born: 11 August 1905; London
- Died: 22 November 1989 (aged 84); Chelmsford, Essex
- Occupation: Nurse

Dorothy Louise Thomas GC (11 August 1905 – 22 November 1989) was a British nurse awarded the Empire Gallantry Medal (EGM) for her actions preventing a major incident at the Middlesex Hospital in January 1934.

== Early life ==
Born in London but raised in Dovercourt, Essex Thomas trained as a nurse at Dovercourt and the Chelsea Hospital for Women before completing her training at the Middlesex Hospital. Thomas remained at the Middlesex after training and became a staff nurse in the operating theatre. By 1929 she had been promoted to Theatre sister, a post she held until 1938.

== Empire Gallantry Medal ==
On 26 January 1934, work commenced as normal and just prior to the first operation of the day the porter was preparing the oxygen cylinders in the anaesthetic room when an explosion occurred and the oxygen from the cylinder ignited sending flames up to 15 feet (4.6 m) into the main operating theatre. The theatre was immediately evacuated due to the risk of the cylinder exploding but Thomas remained behind and went into the anaesthetic room to remove the bottle of ether stored there. She then attempted to close the valve on the oxygen cylinder and found it would close so she did so thus preventing any explosion.

Later investigation concluded that the likely cause of the explosion was piece of grit in the valve which as the porter tightened the valve caused a spark.

Despite what could have been a disaster, normal working was resumed within minutes of Sister Thomas's actions. The hospital board met on 31 January where the incident was discussed. The minutes of the meeting recorded:

Sister Thomas's action undoubtedly averted a catastrophe. She showed great bravery and coolness in that she and all present believe that the cylinder might blow up at any moment. The Board expressed their very high appreciation of Sister Thomas and she was brought before the Board and congratulated by the chairman. The Secretary-Superintendent was instructed to ask Mr. Robert Hunter to approach the Prime Minister with a view to submitting a recommendation for some recognition of her action by the appropriate body.

The recommendation was duly made and on 2 March 1934 notice was published in London Gazette on the immediate award of the Empire Gallantry Medal to Sister Thomas. Rather than attend an investiture ceremony at Buckingham Palace Thomas was presented with the medal by King George V during an official visit to the Middlesex Hospital at the end of March.

== Later career ==
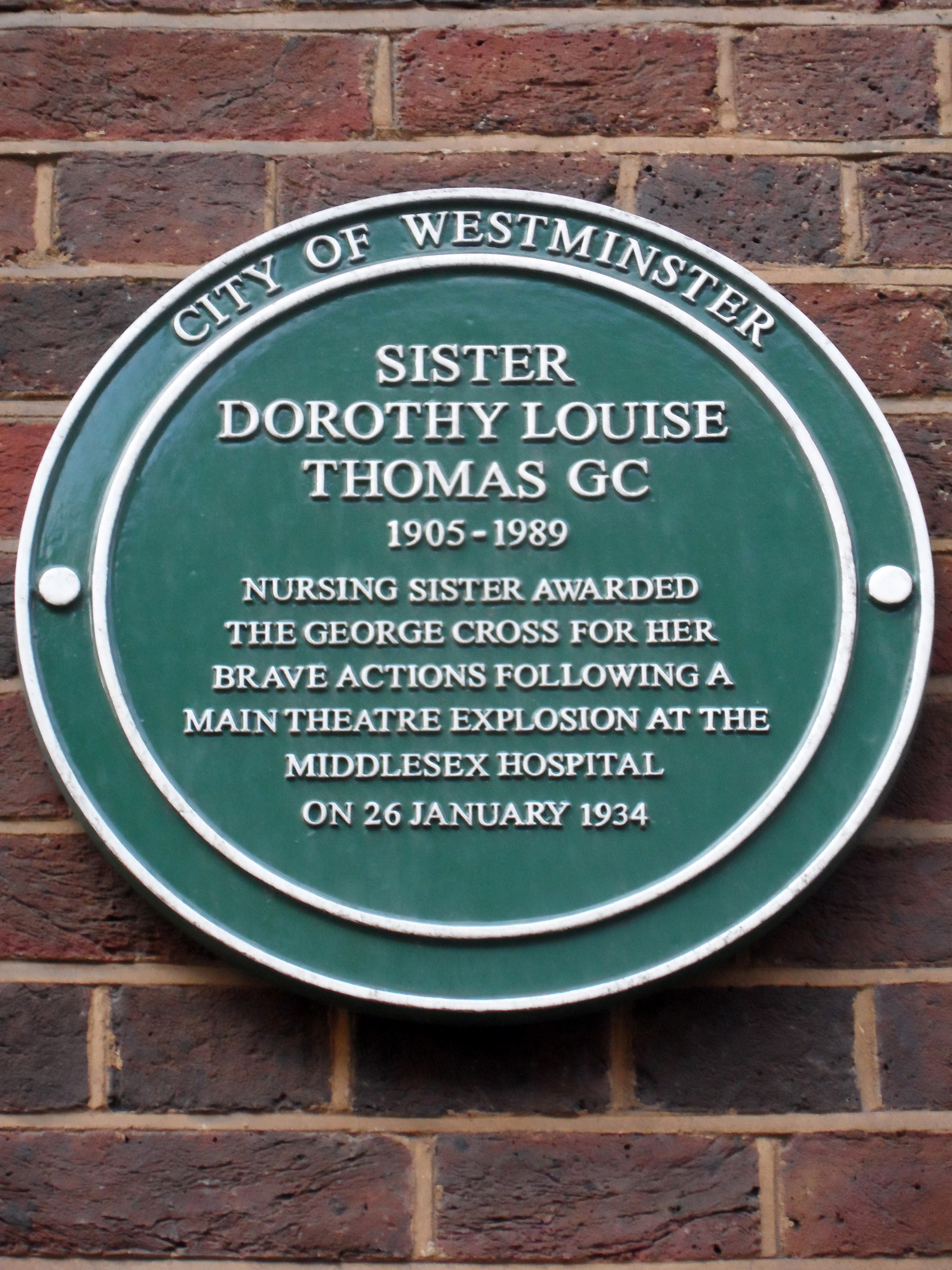
Plaque on John Astor House, Middlesex Hospital, 3 Foley Street, W1

In 1938 Sister Thomas took over responsibility for two wards but later returned to operating theatre work as Theatre Superintendent responsible for the management of all the theatres at the Middlesex Hospital as well as the nearby Soho Hospital for Women.

The Empire Gallantry Medal was superseded by the George Cross and holders of the EGM exchanged their medals for the new George Cross. In February 1942 she attended Buckingham Palace to be awarded the George Cross by King George VI.

After retirement Thomas retired to Chelmsford where she died in 1989 aged 84.

Sister Thomas is commemorated by a blue plaque at John Astor House in London.
