= Bill Stead =

English footballer

Personal information
- Full name: William Alexander George Stead
- Date of birth: July qtr. 1887
- Place of birth: Portsea, Portsmouth, England
- Date of death: 5 June 1939 (aged 51)
- Place of death: Southampton, England
- Position: Goalkeeper

Senior career*
Years	Team	Apps	(Gls)
1905–1906	Southampton	2	(0)
1906	Salisbury City		
1906	Aberdeen		
1906–1907	Salisbury City		
1907–1908	Clapton Orient		
1908–1920	Salisbury City		
- * Club domestic league appearances and goals

William Alexander George Stead (1887 – 5 June 1939) was an English professional goalkeeper who played for Southampton, Salisbury City, Aberdeen and Clapton Orient in the early twentieth century.

== Football career ==
Stead was born in the Portsea area of Portsmouth, but joined south coast rivals Southampton as a teenager. He was the third choice goalkeeper, but following an injury to George Clawley and with Tom Burrows already out for several months, he was called into the first-team for a Southern League match at Brentford on 30 December 1905, which was lost 2–1. He retained his place for the next two matches, a league match at home to Norwich City (won 2–1) and an F.A. Cup match against his home-town club, Portsmouth.

The F.A. Cup match against Portsmouth on 13 January 1906 was the first F.A. Cup meeting between the two fierce rivals. Because of the large crowd expected, the local registrars in both towns postponed voting in the 1906 general election until the following week. The match at The Dell was attended by a capacity crowd of 14,000 and the Portsmouth fans, together with their players, did their best to unsettle the inexperienced 'keeper. Stead, however, showed few signs of nerves and produced a "phlegmatic performance", restricting Portsmouth to a single goal from Dan Cunliffe, while the Saints scored five and eventually progressed to the last eight, where they lost 3–0 at Liverpool.

Following the return of Clawley to full fitness, Stead realised that he was unlikely to obtain regular first-team football with the Saints, so he moved to Salisbury City, then playing in the Second Division of the Southern League. Despite brief spells with Aberdeen and Clapton Orient, Stead remained with the Salisbury club until 1920.

== Later career ==
In 1920, Stead became a seaman on board the Cunard liner Mauretania; he later joined the Union-Castle Line, sailing on the Durban Castle.
