= Walter Anderson (RAF officer, died 1959) =

- Born: 27 July 1890; County Cork
- Died: 11 May 1959 (aged 68); Hythe, Hampshire
- Military career
- Allegiance: United Kingdom
- Branch: Royal Air Force
- Rank: Flying Officer
- Awards: George Cross

Walter Anderson GC (27 July 1890 – 11 May 1959) was a recipient of the George Cross and an officer in the Royal Air Force (RAF).

== Life ==
Anderson was born in County Cork on 27 July 1890. He entered the Royal Navy in 1906 as a Boy 2nd Class and in 1916 transferred to the Royal Naval Air Service. He then joined the RAF, where by 1920 he was a Technical Officer. After service in India and Iraq, he returned to the UK as an Armament Officer at a Flying Training School in Kent. He retired from the RAF in 1932, and died on 11 May 1959 at Hythe, Hampshire.

=== Medal action ===
On 10 December 1928, Pilot Officer, later Air Chief Marshall Sir, Hugh Constantine, while flying a Siskin fighter aircraft off Leysdown on the Isle of Sheppey in Kent, crashed into the sea, about 200 yards from the shore. In cold and rough conditions, Corporal Thomas McTeague and Flying Officer Anderson swam from the shore to Constantine who was in a state of collapse. Through their combined efforts McTeague and Anderson were able to bring Constantine back to the land.

Both Anderson and McTeague were awarded the Empire Gallantry Medal, converted into the George Cross when that award was instituted in 1940. In 1942, accompanied by McTeague, Anderson attended an investiture at Buckingham Palace for the George Cross.

==== Citation ====
Pilot Officer H.A. Constantine while flying an aeroplane off Leysdown on 10 December 1928, crashed into the sea, about 200 yards from shore. Corporal McTeague and Flying Officer Anderson immediately entered the sea from the shore and swam to his assistance. The weather was bitterly cold; an on-shore wind was blowing and the sea was fairly rough. Constantine, fully clothed and suffering from injuries and shock, commenced to swim ashore, but was in a state of collapse when the first swimmer (McTeague) reached him. McTeague, though exhausted himself, supported him until the arrival of Anderson, and Constantine was then brought to safety (this involving swimming for a distance of about 100 yards) by their combined efforts.
The extremely prompt and timely action of Anderson and McTeague, and the gallantry and persistence they displayed, undoubtedly saved the life of Constantine.

Supplement to the London Gazette, 12 April 1929.
