= McTeigue =

McTeigue is a surname. Notable people with the surname include:

- James McTeigue (born 1967), Australian film and television director
- Felix McTeigue, American musician, son of Maggie Roche of The Roches

== See also ==
- McTeague (disambiguation)
- McTigue
