= Cecil Kelly =

Irish barge pilot

Cecil Francis Kelly, GC (c. 1900 – 23 November 1948) was an Irish barge pilot. He was a recipient of the Empire Gallantry Medal, later exchanged for a George Cross.

== Empire Gallantry Medal ==
On 1 February 1937 Cecil Francis Kelly was awarded the Empire Gallantry Medal (gazetted 5 February 1937) for his actions in May 1936. This medal was awarded to Kelly alongside Inspector George Adamson. His citation reads:

In May of 1936, with Mr. Kelly as pilot, Inspector Adamson was in charge of two Port Police launches escorting a cargo of defective dynamite, which was being taken for destruction up the Hooghly River in a towed barge. The barge proved quite unseaworthy, and after a journey of about 15 miles up the river, was sinking. Inspector Adamson and his assistants had no responsibility except for escorting the cargo, but in spite of this they tried at great personal risk to keep the barge afloat by bailing from 7:00 pm until midnight, when it was found necessary to beach the barge on the bank near a large jute mill. In spite of the dynamite exuding nitroglycerine, Inspector Adamson and his two sergeants worked indefatigably in the water and in the dark to help guide the barge ashore by hand. The beaching took five-and-a-half hours.

The barge was partially unloaded, but it was too dangerous to remove the two tons at the bottom, so the barge had to be re-floated, towed into deep water, and sunk. Inspector Adamson rendered great assistance during the whole operation, and stood by in a police launch despite the grave danger. Mr. Kelly supervised the handling of the barge throughout, and without his skilled assistance the feat could not have been accomplished. A small accident, such as the striking of a bootsole nail on a stone in the river bank, the " working " of the hull of the barge when she was subsequently towed off, or a slip with any of the gear used, would have resulted in nearly certain death to those working, and a disaster of the first magnitude to the surrounding mills. Though it was not his duty as pilot, Mr. Kelly remained in the barge while it was towed off the beach and until it was safely sunk, supervising its handling in the current by the two launches.

Both men displayed cool, deliberate, and sustained gallantry for many hours under conditions of the greatest strain.
