= Fratton Park =

Association football ground in Portsmouth, England

- The Old Girl; Fortress Fratton; PO4
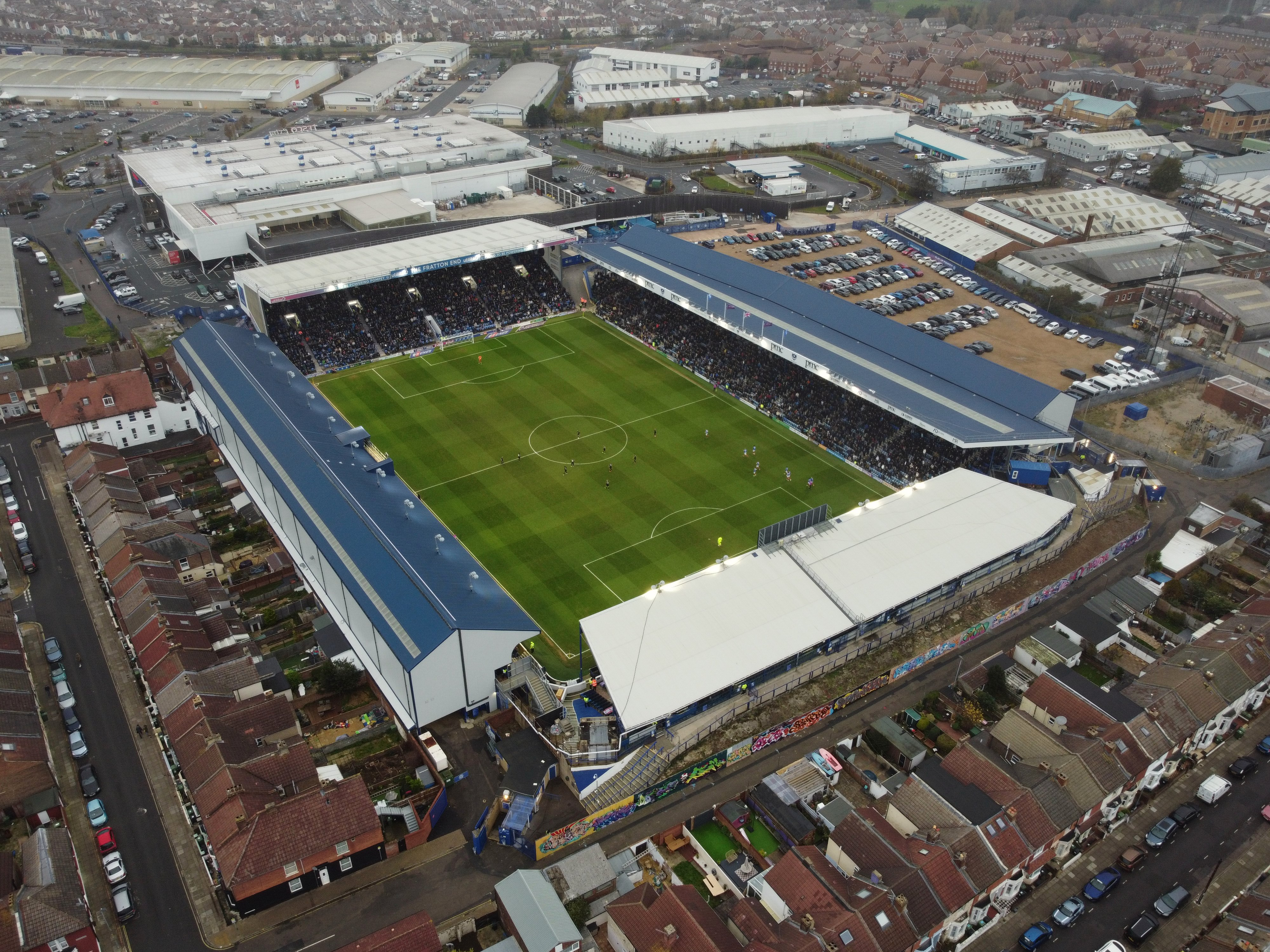
- Interactive map of Fratton Park
- Address: Frogmore Road, Portsmouth, PO4 8RA
- Coordinates: 50°47′47″N 1°3′50″W
- Owner: Portsmouth F.C.
- Capacity: 20,867
- Surface: Natural grass with artificial fibres
- Scoreboard: Digital
- Record attendance: All-time: 51,385 vs. Derby County (26 February 1949); All-seater: 20,821 vs. Tottenham Hotspur (17 October 2009)
- Field size: 100 × 66 m (109 × 72 yards)
- Public transit: Fratton

Construction
- Built: 1899
- Opened: 15 August 1899; 127 years ago (first match: 6 September 1899)
- Renovated: 1900, 1905, 1915, 1925, 1928, 1935, 1949, 1956, 1962, 1974, 1985, 1988, 1996, 1997, 2007, 2015, 2020–present
- Architects: Alfred H. Bone (1898–99, 1905), Arthur Cogswell (1900), Archibald Leitch (1925, 1935), KSS Design Group (1997)

Tenant
- Portsmouth (1899–present)

Website
- https://www.portsmouthfc.co.uk/

Fratton Park is a football ground in Portsmouth, Hampshire, and is the home of Portsmouth Football Club. Constructed in 1899, it has been the only home ground in Portsmouth F.C.'s history. The football ground's location on Portsea Island makes it the only professional English football ground not located on the mainland of Great Britain.

The first match at Fratton Park took place in September 1899. Subsequent developments included the pavilion in 1905, capacity expansion to 58,000 in 1935 (later reduced to 52,000 after the 1946 Burnden Park disaster), and floodlights in 1956, making it the first ground in England to stage an evening Football League match under artificial light. Its maximum capacity has been reduced to 20,867 since it became an all-seater ground in 1996. Several relocations plans proposed during the 1990s and 2000s failed to materialise.

Fratton Park has been affectionately nicknamed "The Old Girl" or "Fortress Fratton" and has reputation for a powerful atmosphere, similar to that of larger capacity stadia.

== History ==
=== Construction and early years ===
After foundation in April 1898, The Portsmouth Football and Athletic Company bought a plot of land near Goldsmith Avenue, Milton to be used primarily for football and "for such outdoor games and exercises that were approved by the directors." It was a four-and-a-half-acre plot of market garden land, bought from the Goldsmith family who owned Milton Farm (and from whom which 'Goldsmith Avenue' is named after).

In September, prominent Football Association representative William Pickford met with Portsmouth director George Lewin Oliver and inspected their plot of land which would soon become a new football ground. The site was shortly to be turfed and fenced and it was hoped that football matches could be played there after Christmas of 1898. However, the land was still covered with a crop of potatoes which the directors were "anxious to sell", which they eventually did, adding to the funds of the newly formed company. On 19 December 1898, the Hampshire Telegraph newspaper ran an advertisement inviting tenders "for the building of two stands: the first, 100 feet long with seven rows of seats on the south side and the second, terracing which stretched for 240 feet on the opposite, north side".

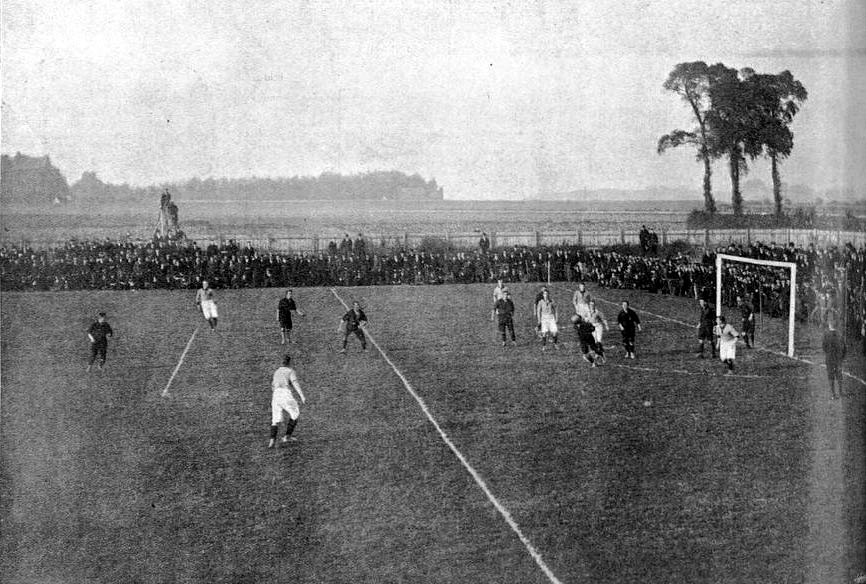
Portsmouth v Ryde match at Fratton Park, 1899. North Terrace and Milton End

Eight months later on 15 August 1899, more than 1,000 people attended the official opening. The name was revealed to be "Fratton Park" after Fratton railway station, despite its location in Milton. This was a slightly dishonest tactic to persuade potential new supporters that the ground was within an easy walking distance of the station and its tram connections, while actually being a one-mile walk east of the station and of Fratton itself. Ironically, later in May 1912 Portsmouth's town council bought the remaining Milton Farm land and opened a public recreation park named Milton Park, only 127 metres east of Fratton Park on Priory Crescent. Construction was finished by early 1900, with the ground featuring turnstiles, dressing rooms, and committee rooms. At this time the stadium was considered as one finest in the country south of London.

The first match at Fratton Park was a friendly against Southampton on 6 September 1899, which Portsmouth won 2–0 with goals from Dan Cunliffe and Harold Clarke. It was attended by 4,141 people with gate receipts of 141 pounds, 14 shillings and 9 pence (equivalent to £15,747 in 2025).

=== Repairs and expansion ===
In 1901, the roof of the south stand was blown off by a gale and subsequently repaired. This would happen again 15 years later in March 1916, causing extensive damage to nearby houses in Carisbrooke Road and Ruskin Avenue.

On 2 March 1903 Fratton Park has hosted its only England international match, a 2–1 win against Wales.

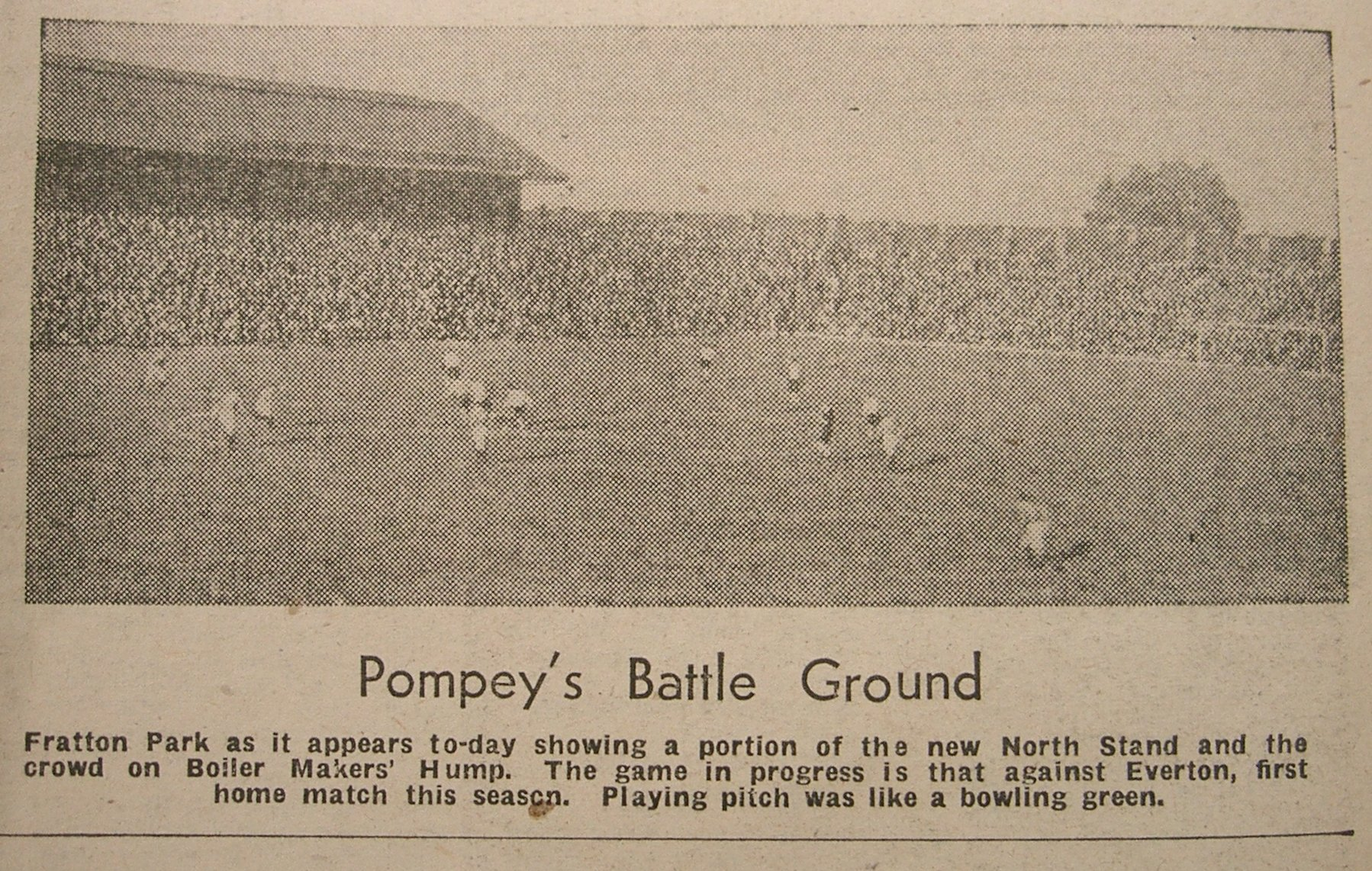
A league match post-1905 renovations, showing the newly-covered North Stand (left), Boilermakers Hump (centre) and Milton Stand (right)

In 1905, the stadium received significant upgrades. Club director Sir John Brickwood gifted the stadium a facelift, adding a clock tower, balcony, and mock-Tudor pavilion, the latter of which the is still retained in design. The stands were also renovated, with the northern terrace replaced with a roofed stand, and the sight lines for east and west ends improved with new terraces. It is likely that this series of renovations connected the northern terrace to the east, forming the 'Milton Corner' or later 'The Boilermakers Hump'. The west end also received an upgrade in 1915 to accommodate 8,000 standing supporters under a roof, but with no exterior wall to allow coastal winds to dry the pitch.

On 6 June 1918, an American army team played a Canadian army team in a baseball match at Fratton Park, with the gate money donated to the British Red Cross. The US army team won 4–3.

By 1925, the South Stand was becoming overcrowded, and the club commissioned Archibald Leitch for a new design. Construction began on 17 June 1925 and was completed just ten weeks later at a cost of £20,000 (equivalent to £1,050,000 in 2025). The new stand featured seats and benches in the upper section and a standing 'paddock' underneath, below pitch level. It also contained new dressing rooms moved from the Fratton Park pavilion with a "tunnel" leading to the pitch, and removed or absorbed much of the original mock-Tudor design from 1905. As the new South Stand was much larger than the original, the Fratton Park pitch was reduced in width from 77 to 73 yards. On 29 August 1925 Football League President John McKenna officially opened the stand before just before a home game against Middlesbrough.

In 1934, the club announced that the North Terrace was to be rebuilt with a much larger stand, increasing the overall ground capacity to more than 58,000 with 33,000 sheltered by a roof. The renovations were to be funded by the sale of defender Jimmy Allen in June 1934 and money from the 1934 FA Cup Final. The new North Stand was again designed by Leitch and later opened by McKenna, both of whom respectively designed and opened the previous South Stand rebuild in 1925. On 7 September 1935 the new North Stand was opened just before kickoff of the game against visitors Aston Villa, captained by former Portsmouth player Jimmy Allen whose sale the previous year had funded the build. Unofficially nicknamed the "Jimmy Allen Stand", the new North Stand contained a roofed all-standing upper tier and a rebuilt lower.

Southampton F.C. were briefly forced to switch home matches to Fratton Park during World War II when a German Luftwaffe bomb was dropped and hit their home at The Dell, Southampton in November 1940, leaving an 18-foot wide crater on the pitch which damaged an underground water culvert, flooding the pitch.

=== Capacity reduction and further additions ===
After the Burnden Park disaster of 1946, Fratton Park's capacity was reduced from 58,000 to 52,000 for safety reasons. More safety measures were added in 1948, including levelling gangways, adding perimiter walls and new stairwells. In 1951, 4,226 seats were fitted onto the upper standing terrace tier of the North Stand. These seats were initially disliked by some of the stand's displaced supporters, blaming the North Stand's reduced standing capacity and also an increase in ticket price to the seated section. However, the revenue earned from the new seats was reinvested back into Fratton Park as in 1956, a new license was obtained to rebuild and increase the Fratton End to a standing capacity of 5000.

On 26 July 1948, Fratton Park hosted a Netherlands vs Ireland first-round football game in the 1948 London Olympics, one of only two grounds outside London to host matches in the Olympic football tournament. The game at Fratton Park was attended by a crowd of 8,000, with a 3–1 win to the Netherlands.

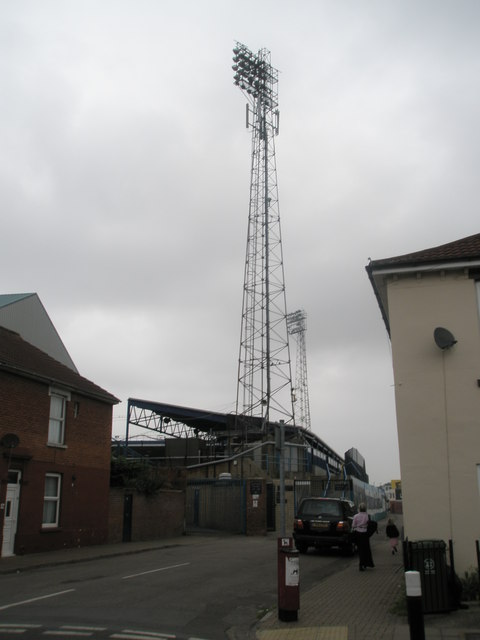
The south-east (near) and north-east (far) floodlights at the Milton End and Specks Lane in 2008

In February 1956, floodlights were fitted to the roof ends of the South Stand and North Stand. On 22 February 1956, Fratton Park played host to the first Football League First Division match under floodlights, losing 0–2 to Newcastle United.

In summer 1956, the club built a new Fratton End stand, demolishing the original Railway End. A new stand was built before the new season using a new prefabricated concrete and steel method, one of the first of its kind. The newly-named 'Fratton End' stand was opened on 25 August 1956 before the first home game of the season by Sir Lesley Bowker, the vice-chairman of The Football Association. After its opening the stand was blamed for poor pitch quality as it blocked the westerly winds from drying the pitch, and wind shutters had to be installed onto the back wall to allow wind to pass through. This rebuild would later suffer structural issues in 1986, when it was found the concrete aggregate from The Solent used contained high levels of sea salt and had caused the upper tiers' steel structure to corrode and weaken. Consequently the upper tier was closed until 1988, when it was demolished.

In 1974, Fratton Park became the first football stadium in England to dig deep "moat" trenches to prevent pitch invasions on recommendation by the Minister of Sport and Recreation Denis Howell. The 1980s saw a number of alterations, including perimeter fences in 1983 for pitch invasions (later removed following the Hillsborough Disaster), safety upgrades in 1985 after the Bradford City stadium fire (including additional fire escape staircases and enclosing flammable sections of the stands) and refurbishment of the South and North stands in 1988, along with the demolition of the unsafe upper tier at the Fratton End which was not restored until 1997.

On 12 March 1983, Cardiff City fans climbed the scoreboard at the back of the Milton End terrace and stole the hands from the Milton End clock. Both teams were chasing promotion to Division One at the time - Portsmouth were eventually crowned champions with Cardiff runners-up. In 1989, one of Portsmouth's crossbars was found to be one inch too low by a match referee and was readjusted to ensure fair play.

=== Conversion to all-seater and a new Fratton End ===
In the summer of 1996, Fratton Park became an all-seater stadium to meet the Taylor Report standards, but the seats in the Fratton End would only last a year.

In 1997, the Fratton End was demolished entirely and rebuilt. Planning permission had already been granted four times in the previous nine years (1988, 1991, 1995, and 1996) but work was delayed primarily due to relegation to Division Two in 1988, which many fans theorise was connected to the partial closure of Fratton End in 1988. The stand, designed by KSS (who also planned the 1996 design), was single-tiered with 4,500 seats and no corporate boxes which was cheaper than previous plans. A portrait of club legend Jimmy Dickinson was designed into the southern wing seating, whilst a roof extension was also added to the North Stand at the same time. It was opened without ceremony on 31 October 1997 at 4.59pm, with one minute to spare before a 5pm opening clearance deadline. Problems with some misoriented floodlights caused the Fratton End of the pitch to be "shrouded in gloom on Hallowe'en", according to the Sky Sports 3 TV commentator, causing some doubt on whether the live evening televised Division One game against Swindon Town would take place. Initially, the new stand was officially known as 'The KJC Stand' under a sponsorship agreement with the mobile telephone retailer KJC Mobile Phones Limited.

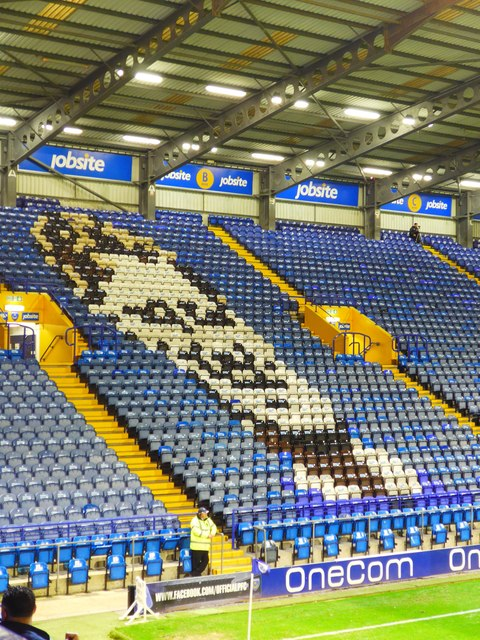
The Fratton End. Former player & manager Jimmy Dickinson is remembered in the seating design

On 4 April 1998, the new Fratton End received a formal opening ceremony in Portsmouth F.C.'s 100th Anniversary Year celebrations in a league match against Birmingham City, one day before the official 100-year club anniversary on 5 April. The match ended 1–1 with an attendance of 14,591 supporters.

In 2007, under the new ownership of Alexandre Gaydamak, further renovations occurred. Three rows of seating were controversially retrofitted to the top of the South Stand, concealing Archibald Leitch's original 'X' trusses that were a notable feature of the original design.

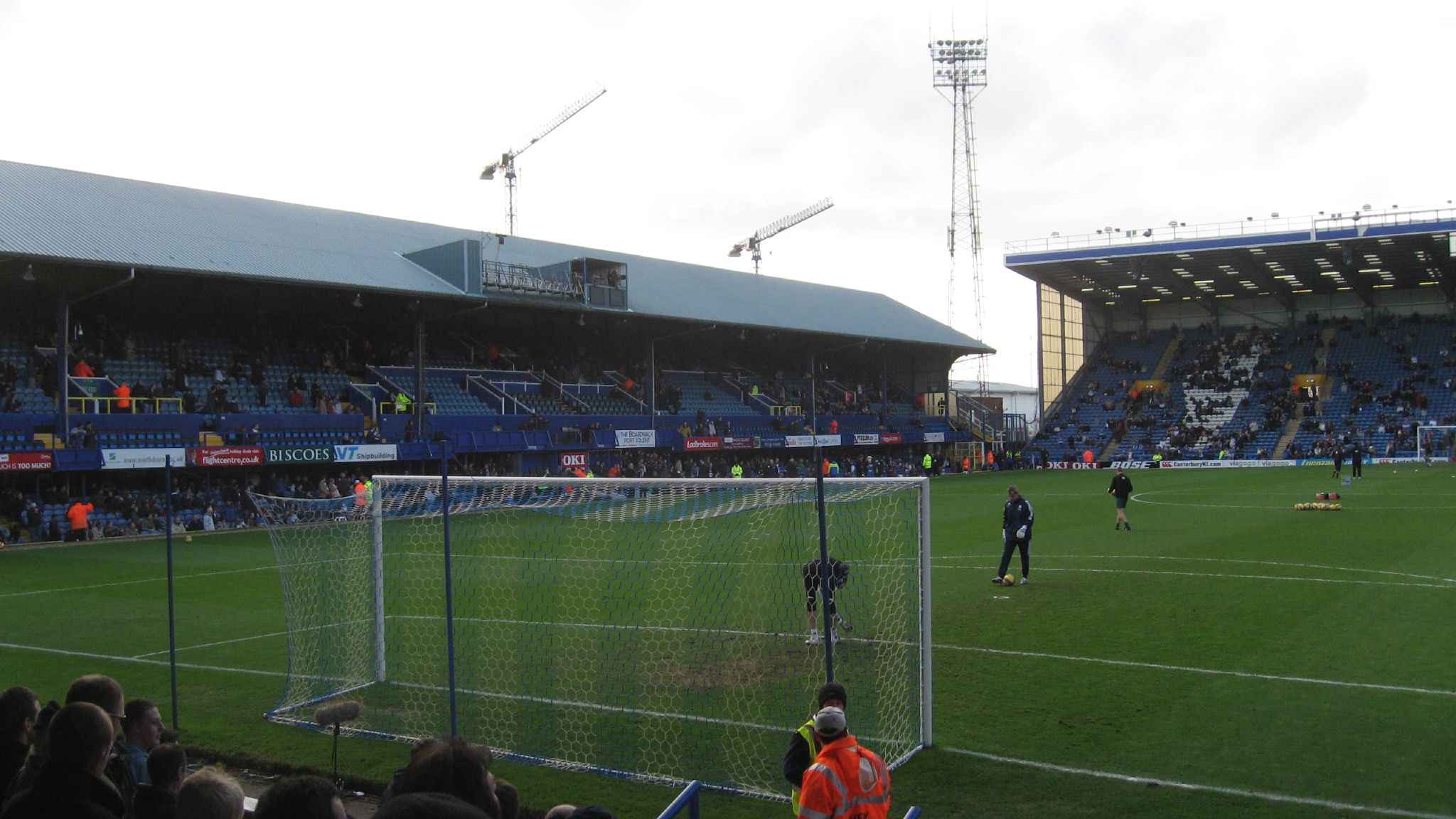
Archibald Leitch's 1925 South Stand in February 2008

On 16 July 2012, Fratton Park acted as the start location of Day 59 of the seventy day long London 2012 Olympic Torch Relay. The Day 59 relay route began with veteran Portsmouth F.C. steward John Jenkins as runner number 001, who then carried the Olympic flame onto and around the Fratton Park pitch. The Day 59 route was Portsmouth to Brighton & Hove.

In the summer of 2015 the pitch was relaid as a perfect rectangle - from 1899 and 1997 it was a parallelogram, after which it was trapezoidal following the Fratton End rebuild. On 17 December 2016, The Pompey Supporters Trust unveiled the 'Wall Of Fame' plaques to the rear wall of the North Stand, featuring the names of all the 2300 PST shareholders who helped save Portsmouth F.C. from liquidation by the High Court Of Justice on 10 April 2013. In summer 2018, a large video screen was installed to the roof line of the Milton End.

In 2019, the South Stand underwent major improvements. Work included new exterior cladding, a new roof, new guttering, new lighting (including emergency lighting), replacing internal structural steelwork, and a larger camera gantry. Work was completed in time for the first fixture of the 2019–20 season against Birmingham City. This was the first evening game played without any light from Fratton Park's iconic four corner floodlight pylon towers since their erection in 1962.

=== 2020s development and regeneration ===
On 14 January 2020 the club announced "Phase 1" of the Fratton Park Stadium Regeneration & Development Plan, a multi-year phased plan to modernise the ground. This initially involved a redevelopment of the Milton End stand and surrounding areas, providing increased capacity, additional disabled supporter seating (as well as new disabled away seating), and more flexibilty in the proportion of away seating capacity. In April 2020 'substantial' and 'essential works' to the North Stand began, involving addition of translucent roof panels and replacement of the roof, external cladding and beams which was completed in September.

In June 2021, work started on the stadium's first major change since 1997. Firstly, the North Stand's seats from 1996 were removed and replaced, adding 600 additional seats and extra wheelchair spaces, completed in May 2022. From April to July 2022, the South Stand was converted into a single continuous tier, once again revealing Archibald Leitch "X" truss design on the upper tier which had been covered since 1985. These works reduced the South Stand capacity by 450 seats which was offset by an increase in the North Stand, and exposed Lower South Stand seats to rain which were not covered in the original design.

On 2 November 2022, Portsmouth F.C. announced that a third phase of Fratton Park refurbishment works had begun in the Milton End to increase its capacity. Later on in August 2023, Fratton End had additional safe standing added.

During the 2024 summer break, new television gantries were added to the Fratton and South stands, completed in August.

== Structure and facilities ==
Fratton Park is built in a traditional English style with four separate stands of varied designs and sizes, named The North Stand (north), The South Stand (south), The Milton End (east) and The Fratton End (west). The pitch measures 115 × 73 yards, and is aligned from east to west, which is considered unusual in English football, as most other pitches are orientated north to south to maximise natural sunlight.

=== Stands ===
==== The South Stand ====
Along with the North Stand, the South Stand was one of the original two stands built in 1899 and now seats 4,856 home supporters. It also contains the player's dressing rooms, the pitchside tunel, and director's box, TV gantry and journalist seating. This stand features Archibald Leitch's iconic truss design from his 1925 reconstruction, the oldest surviving example in the UK.

==== The North Stand ====
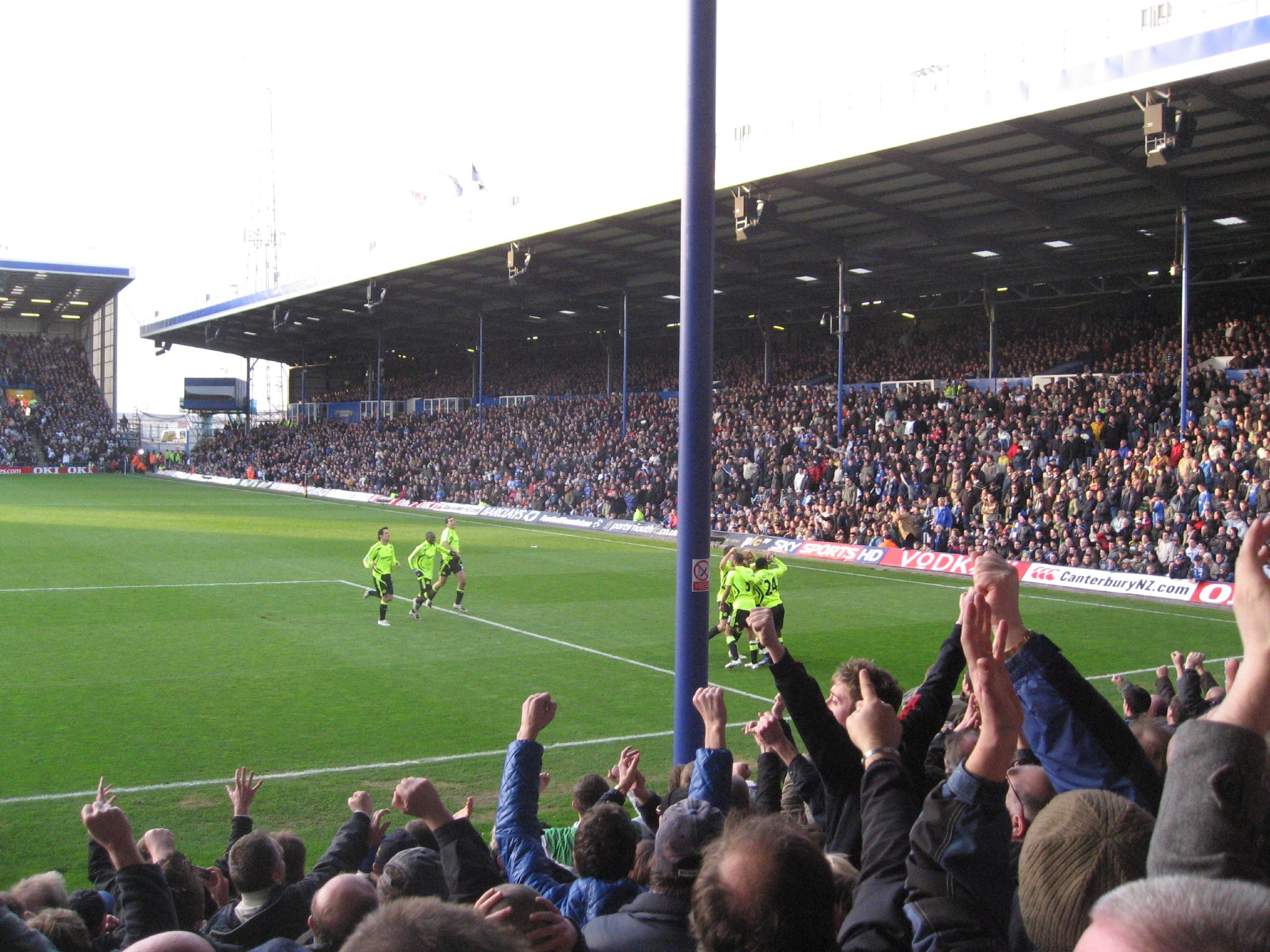
The North Stand as seen in a match v Chelsea, February 2008

Along with the South Stand, one of the original two stands built in 1899 and now seats 8,147 supporters over two tiers. It was built with an irregularly-angled western end, due to the unparallel Milton Lane public footpath behind the stand.

==== The Milton End ====
At the eastern end of Fratton Park is the 'Milton End', seating both home and away supporters with a capacity of 3,196. Originally known as the Spion Kop a corner terrace later connected it to the North Stand which became known as the 'Milton Corner' or 'Boilermakers Hump'.

==== The Fratton End ====
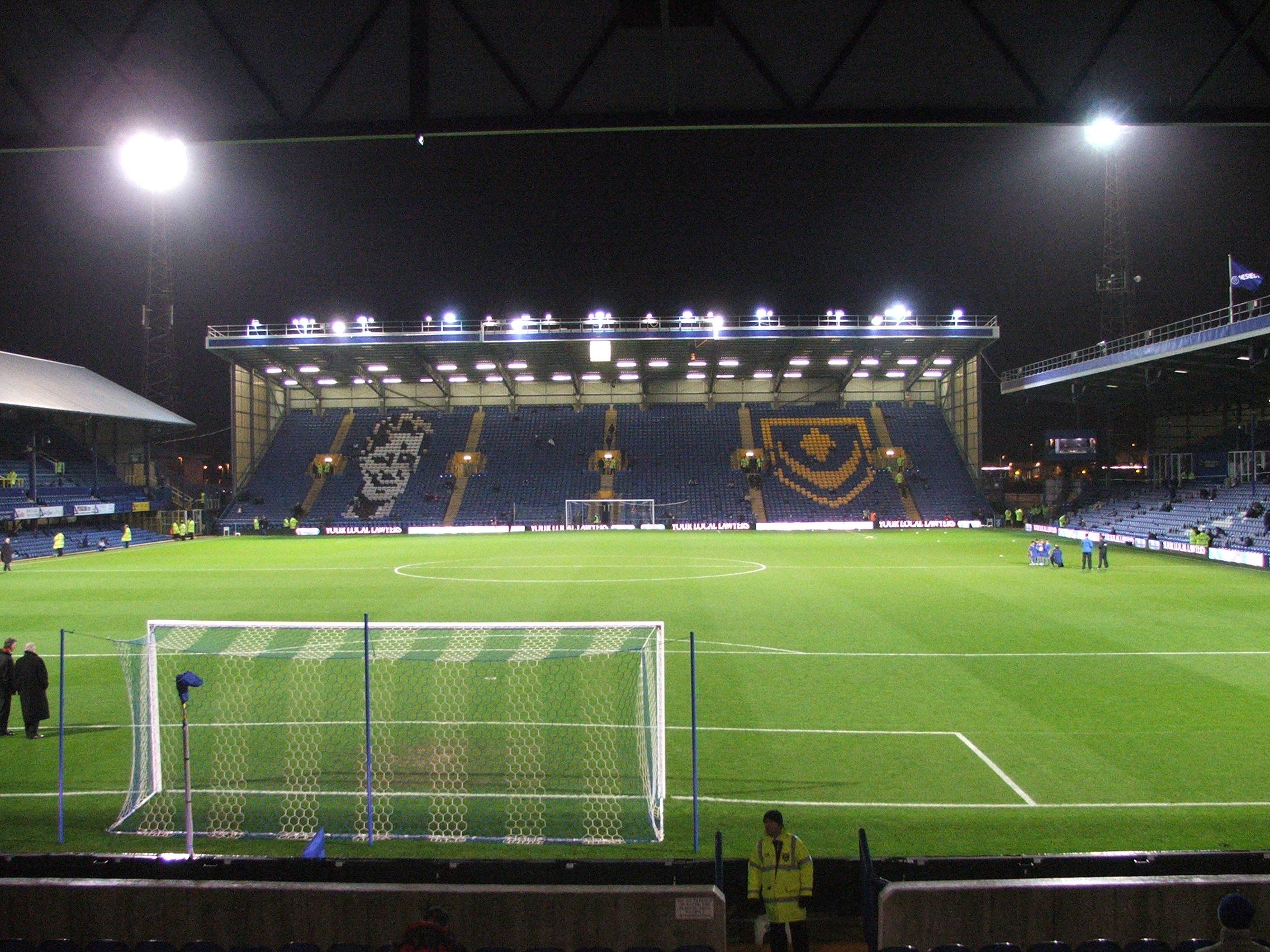
The Fratton End in 2008. Former player-manager Jimmy Dickinson is remembered in the seating design

To the west is the 'Fratton End' with a capacity of 4,700, so-named as it is the nearest stand to Fratton railway station. It is known today for housing the most vocal of home supporters, who were formerly located across the centre of the North Stand's lower terrace and along the Boilermaker's Hump. Between 1997 and 2000 a large analogue clock hung in the roof, but was removed for repair in the mid-2000s and never seen since. Rumours persist that a Havant-based clock repair company was not paid and have kept the clock until payment is received. The rear of the stand features a pub sign that was originally hung outside 'The Pompey' public house, designed by Arthur Edward Cogswell in 1900.

==== 'The Boilermakers Hump' (or 'Milton Corner') ====
'The Boilermakers Hump' or 'Milton Corner' is a connected seating area between the North stand and Milton End, likely first built during upgrades in 1905. The name originates from the men who met at the corner on matchdays who worked in building and maintaining steam boilers for the Royal Navy fleet at Portsmouth dockyard, and the 'hump'-like appearance of the corner terrace which was higher than surrounding stands. The Boilermakers had an unruly reputation, often sneaking out of work early for midweek afternoon matches, unwashed and drunk. Other fans were wary of this group, allowing them to claim the 'Hump' for themselves.

In 1949, the 'hump' appearance was corrected to be level with the rest of the stands. Today, the Hump is the closest point between home and away supporters and offers seating for both, but is mostly occupied by a police and security control room box, built in 1985 following Bradford City stadium fire.

=== Other structures ===
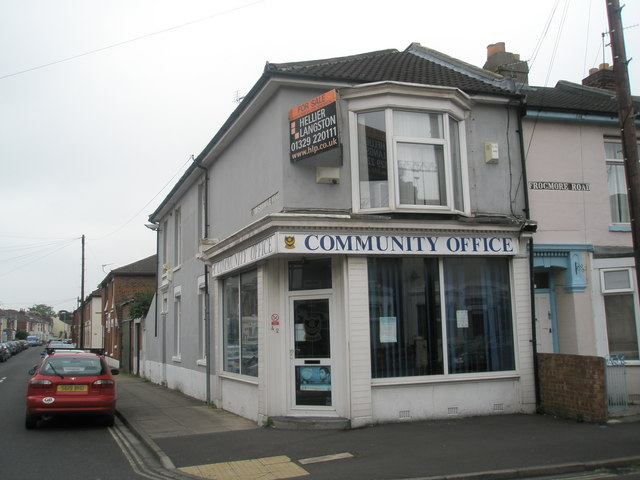
42 Frogmore Road, the former premises of Portsmouth F.C. Community Office and briefly as a Pompey Store in 2011

Numerous buildings near the ground have been built or repurposed by the club throughout its history. In October 1954, the club built a player's gymnasium on Milton Lane. An extra storey was added in 1978 before it was demolished in the early 2000s and a Tesco Extra was built on the former site in 2015. A private residence at 42 Frogmore Road was purchased and converted into the first retail location for the Pompey Shop, before changing to a community office in 1988 after the shop relocated and was eventually sold in the 2000s. It temporarily revived its store in 2011 before becoming a private residence again. After the club store was moved out of 42 Frogmore Road, it relocated to the former Pompey pub. Multiple venue changes occurred over the next 20 years, before the current flagship outlet was opened in July 2018 at 16 Anson Road, behind Fratton Park's North Stand. The club also owned 57 Frogmore Road (known as Offside Cottage) and used it as the offices of the Portsmouth Supporters Club, before its demolition in 1966 for new offices, supporter lounges and turnstiles.

==== Floodlights ====
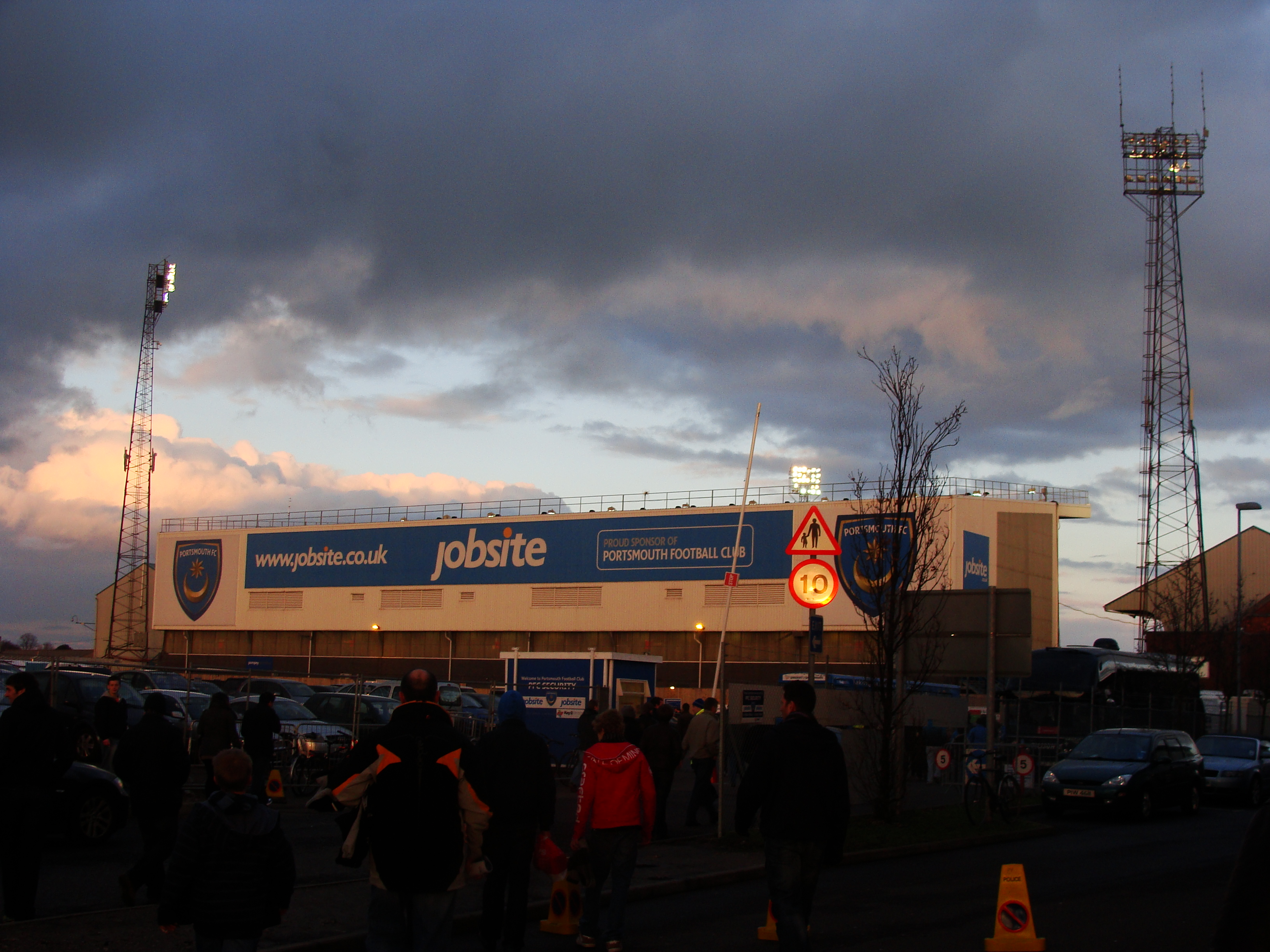
Floodlight pylons at Fratton Park's western end in 2010

Fratton Park's floodlights were first installed on the North and South stands in February 1956, making Portsmouth F.C. the first English club to stage a league match under floodlights later than month. In 1962, these were replaced with four new floodlight tower pylons, with Portsmouth Supporters Club contributing £12,000 (approx £254,000 in 2018) to their construction. Further modernisation was planned in 1997 but failed to materialise after the club entered into administration in 1999. The floodlights remained until September 2015, when Musco Lighting installed new lamps across the edges of Fratton, North, and Milton stands after corrosion and water leaks were found in the existing pylons. It was also discovered that the South Stand roof was not capable of supporting the new lighting equipment, so the decision was taken to keep the two southern corner floodlight towers operational.

After the South Stand roof underwent improvements in 2019, removal began on the original floodlights. Work was carried out by Hughes & Salvidge, the same company that demolished Southampton F.C.'s ground The Dell. The northern pylons were moved to the stadium car park to serve as a landmark and telecommunications tower. In their place, rooftop-mounted floodlights were fitted to the new roof of the South Stand, with final pylon removed in November 2020.

==== The Fratton Park Pavilion ====
The south-west corner of Fratton Park features a mock Tudor pavilion, gifted to the club in 1905 by its first chairman Sir John Brickwood and designed by director Major Alfred H. Bone. Originally it featured a tall octagonal clock tower spire, players dressing rooms and the club offices, but the spire was removed in 1925 to allow space for the construction of the current South Stand. The pavilion was later repainted in the 1970s to match the colour scheme of "The Pompey" pub.

==== Jimmy Dickinson Statue ====
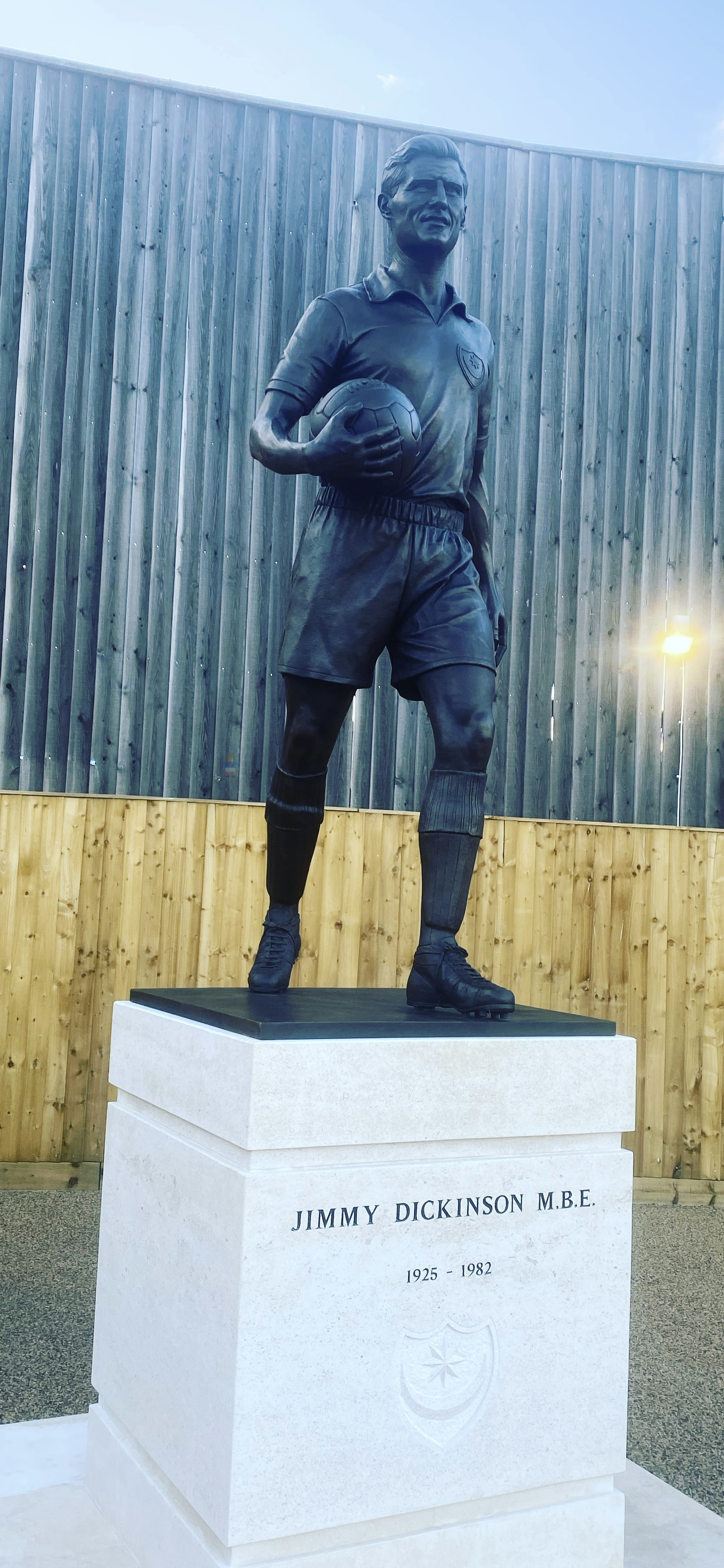
Jimmy Dickinson statue

On 23 September 2023, a bronze statue of Jimmy Dickinson by Douglas Jennings was unveiled at Fratton Park's northwest corner by Jimmy's son Andrew Dickinson and former Portsmouth goalkeeper, Alan Knight. The statue was commissioned by the Pompey Supporters' Trust and crowdfunded by fans of the club.

==== The Pompey ====
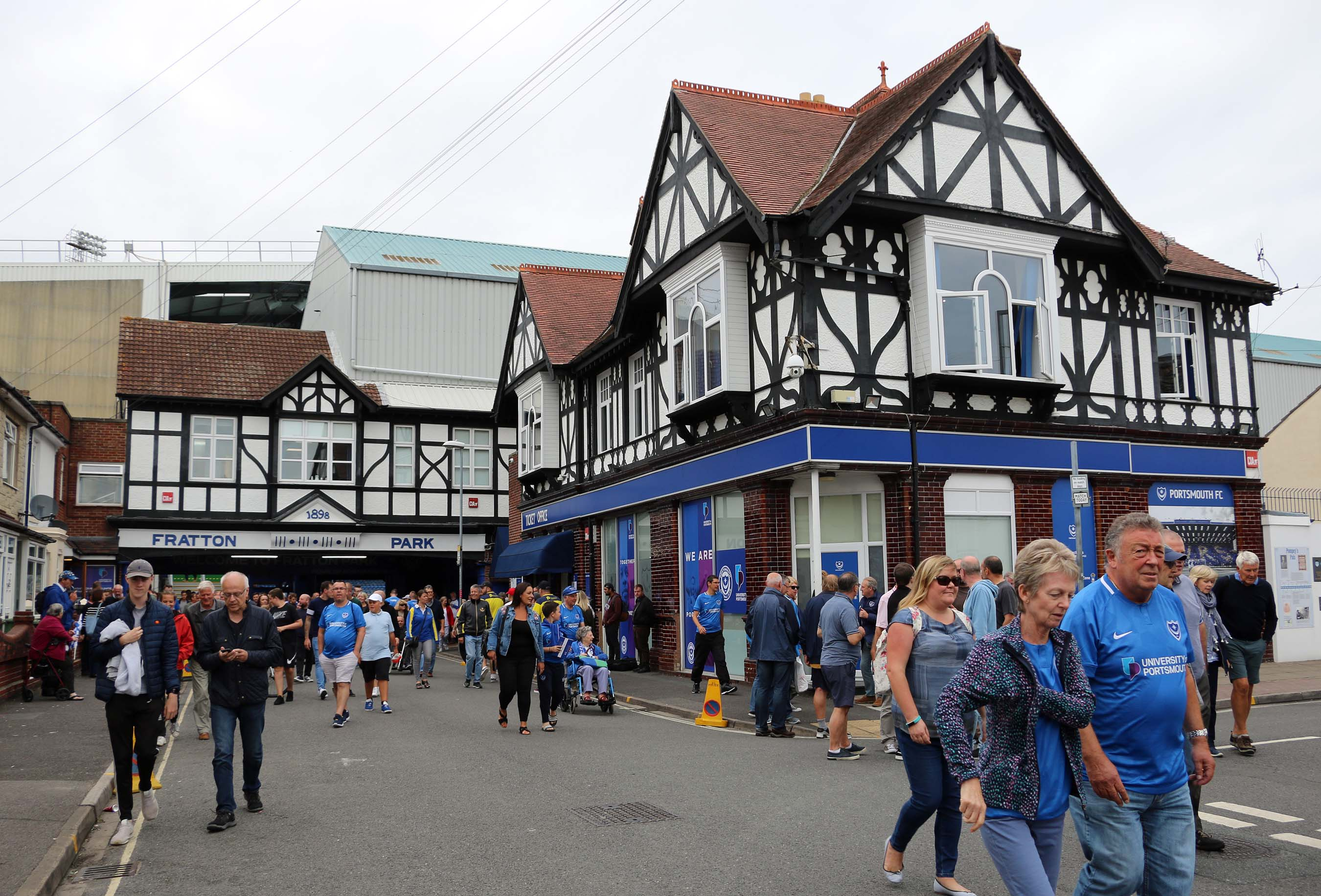
The Fratton Park Pavilion building (left) and former pub The Pompey at 44 Frogmore Road, used here as a ticket office (right)

The Pompey is a former Brickwoods Brewery pub located directly outside the stadium at 44 Frogmore Road. Built by Arthur Cogswell in 1900, one year after the grounds' initial construction, it is the oldest surviving building at Fratton Park. Cogswell had built many other Brickwoods Brewery pubs around the Portsmouth area and was also a football enthusiast, having previously formed the defunct Portsmouth Association Football Club (1884 to 1896).

The Pompey closed in 1988, and shortly afterward was purchased by the club who converted it into a shop. The shop changed locations in 1999, and since then it has served various roles including the club's media centre, a hospitality venue, and most recently a ticket office. The pub's former sign is currently hung on the rear wall of The Fratton End stand. In June 2020 the exterior branding was removed, restoring its public house configuration and revealing the original Brickwoods Brewery mosaic tiling that had been covered for at least thirty years.

== Records ==
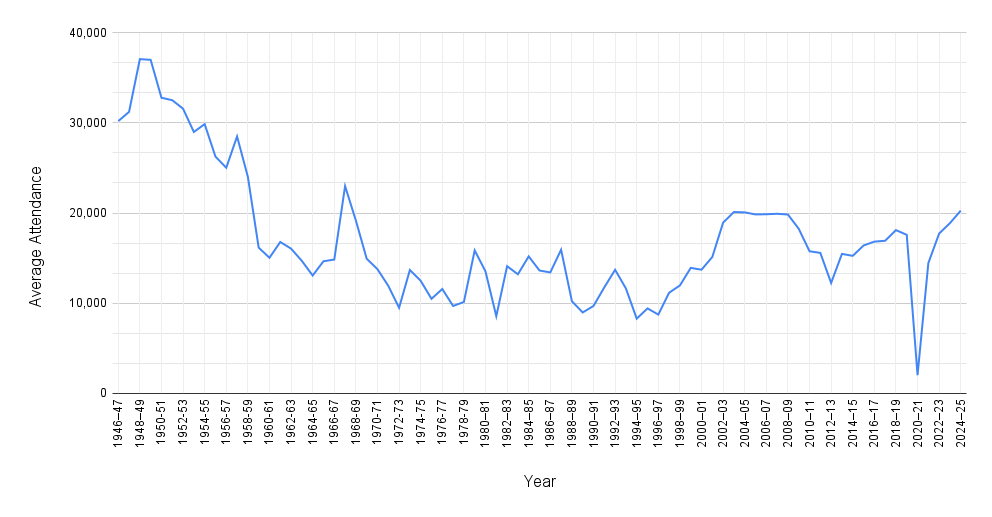
Average attendances at Fratton Park, 1946–2025

=== Crowd attendance record ===
Fratton Park's all-time crowd attendance record is 51,385, set at an FA Cup quarter-final match against Derby County on 26 February 1949 in which Portsmouth won 2–1. This record was set when the ground had maximum capacity of 52,000 (post 1946 Burnden Park disaster), before its conversion to an all-seater in 1996 as a result of the compulsory seating rules recommended by the Taylor Report. Since the then, the all-seated attendance record is 20,821 which was achieved on 17 October 2009, a Premier League match played with visitors Tottenham Hotspur.

=== Largest Fratton Park home win ===
On 9 April 1927, Portsmouth beat Notts County a record 9–1 in the successful 1926–27 Football League Division Two season.

=== Largest Fratton Park home defeats ===
By largest margin:

- On 16 January 1937, Portsmouth lost 0–5 to Tottenham Hotspur in Round Three of the FA Cup.
- On 15 October 1955, Portsmouth lost 0–5 to Birmingham City in a Football League Division One game in the 1955–56 season.
- On 24 March 2010, Portsmouth lost 0–5 to Chelsea F.C. in the FA Premier League.

By greatest number of goals conceded:

- On 17 September 1958, Portsmouth lost 2–6 to West Bromwich Albion in Football League Division One in the 1958–59 season.

=== Largest quantity of Fratton Park goals ===
By highest aggregate score:

- 11 goals – On 29 September 2007, Portsmouth defeated Reading F.C. 7–4 in the FA Premier League; this match is notable as the highest scoring match in Premier League history.

== Transport ==
Fratton Park is closest to Fratton railway station, roughly one mile to the west of the ground (about ten minutes' walk away). Fratton railway station is located on the Portsmouth Direct Line branch, which links to both London Waterloo station and London Victoria station. Services from London, Southampton, Bournemouth, Bristol, Cardiff and Brighton all stop at Fratton railway station before reaching the main Portsmouth & Southsea or Portsmouth Harbour railway stations.

By road, Fratton Park is close to the A2030 on the east coast of Portsea Island, and is named Velder Avenue at its southern end, and Eastern Road to its north. At the north Eastern Road end of the A2030, it intersects with the main A27 south coast trunk road at Farlington, Portsmouth. This A27 intersection has the M27 motorway to its west, and A27 to the east. Further to the east, the A27 links to the A3(M) to London and the M25 motorway which orbits London.

By sea, Portsmouth International Port has passenger ferry routes to the Channel Islands, northern France, and northern Spain. From Portsmouth Harbour railway station, there are foot passenger ferries to Gosport and the Isle of Wight. A car ferry service to the Isle of Wight also operates from nearby Gunwharf.

== Proposed relocations ==
=== Portsmouth Airport, Hilsea ===
Portsmouth Airport was a grass field aerodrome that closed in December 1973 due to a series of aircraft accidents. Portsmouth City Council offered the land for a stadium relocation following Hampshire County Council's plans to build a new "M276" motorway route across the existing Fratton Park site. However, the move was dropped in 1976 due to high construction costs, an unwillingness for the club to relocate, and the road scheme plans being cancelled.

=== Farlington (Parkway Stadium) ===
Following the Hillsborough disaster and subsequent Taylor Report, Portsmouth F.C. sought a new 25,000 capacity all-seater stadium. In 1992, the Farlington playing fields and adjoining vacant land were identified as a potential location, with the "Parkway" scheme revealed publicly in 1993. Plans also included a new railway station, retail development, and re-provision of pitches, but were ultimately rejected by Secretary of State in December 1994 due to environmental concerns, lack of justification for retail development, poor vehicular access, and inadequate redevelopment of pitches.

=== Fratton Goods Yard, Milton ===
At the end of the 2003–04 season in the Premier League, plans were announced to build a new stadium on the site of an adjacent disused rail-freight depot, known as Fratton Goods Yard. These plans, which were supported by the city council, would have allowed a much needed increase in ground capacity, as it was claimed that an increase would be impossible to achieve on the current Fratton Park footprint because of the close proximity of residential housing, particularly in Alverstone Road and Carisbrooke Road in Milton.

However, before work could begin, the plans were superseded by a newer proposal to redevelop the existing Fratton Park site by rotating the pitch 90 degrees to accommodate a larger capacity stadium, funded in part by a "Pompey Village" residential, hotel and retail project on the adjacent Fratton Goods Yard site. Work on the stadium was due to commence in the summer of 2006, but no residential or stadium construction phases ever began. However, the first retail and hotel phase of the redevelopment was completed a year later in 2007, opening as "The Pompey Centre".

=== The Hard, Portsea ===
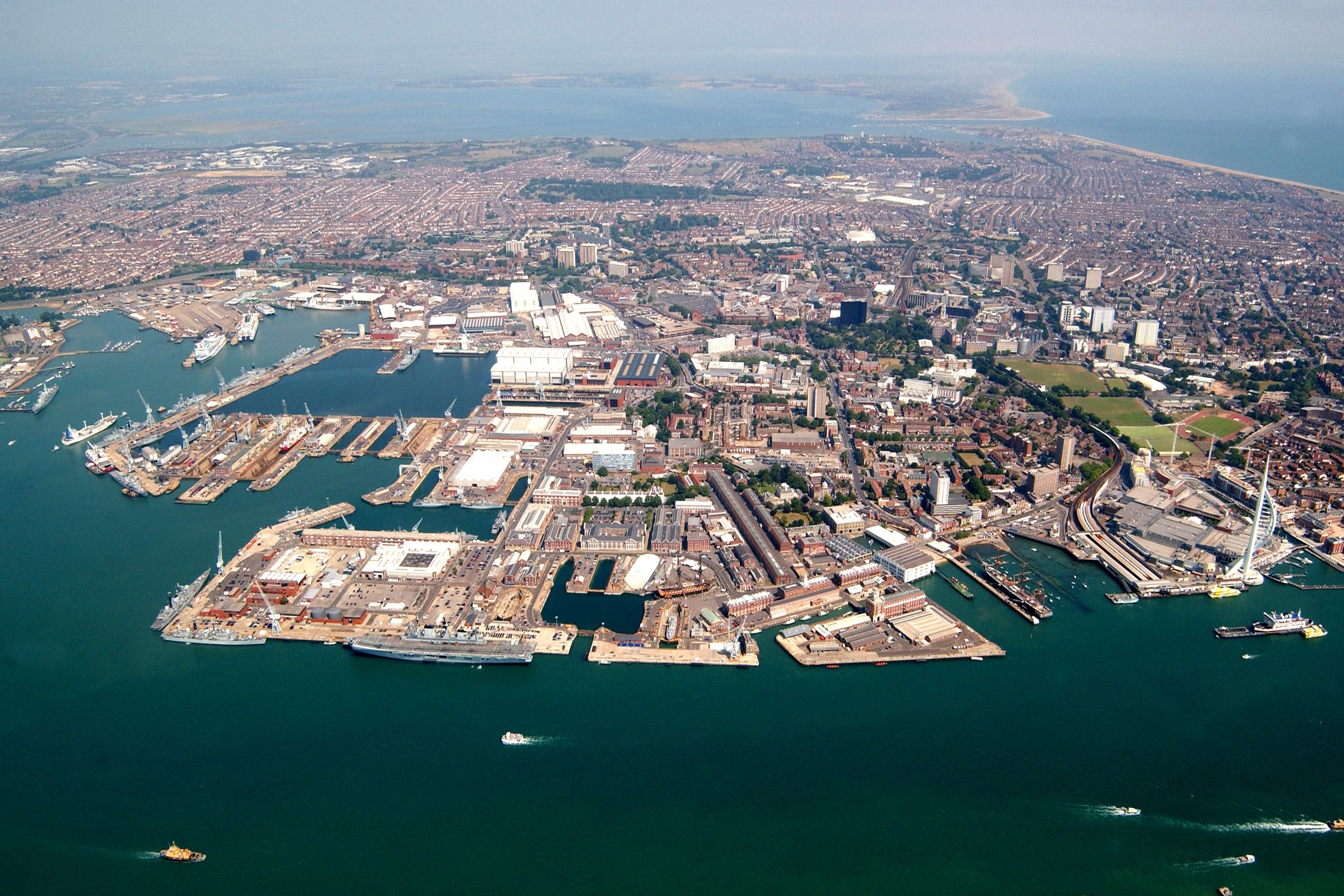
Aerial view of HMNB Portsmouth, with proposed stadium location The Hard in the bottom right

In April 2007, plans were announced for a 36,000-seat stadium built over The Hard in Portsea, between Portsmouth Naval Base and Portsmouth Harbour railway station. The plans also included nearby leisure amenities, restaurants, cafes, and 1,500 apartments. Plans were dropped later that year after concerns about transport access, proximity to a Site of Special Scientific Interest, and concerns from the Ministry of Defence over the operational capacity of the Naval Base.

=== Horsea Island ===
In 2008, a set of plans was approved, to build a new 35,000 capacity stadium and leisure/residential complex on Horsea Island, situated at the north of Portsmouth Harbour close to Port Solent marina. In 2009 the Horsea Island development was put on hold due to financial issues. The previous proposal to rotate the existing pitch at Fratton Park by 90 degrees was re-instated. Work was due to begin late 2009, with a gradual increase in capacity until completion in 2010 ending with a capacity of 30,000. No such pitch rotation was undertaken.

== See also ==
- List of English football stadiums by capacity
- Ground improvements at English football Stadia

== Bibliography ==
- Inglis, Simon (1996). Football Grounds of Britain. Collins Willow. ISBN 0-00-218426-5.
