= Sandy Hodge (Royal Navy officer) =

Alexander Mitchell Hodge
- Born: 23 June 1916; Blairgowrie, Scotland
- Died: 4 January 1997 (aged 80)
- Military career
- Allegiance: United Kingdom
- Branch: Royal Naval Volunteer Reserve
- Rank: Captain
- Nickname: Sandy
- Conflicts: Second World War
- Awards: George Cross; Mentioned in Despatches; Decoration for Officers of the Royal Naval Volunteer Reserve
- Other work: Lawyer; Deputy Lieutenant of Edinburgh

Alexander Mitchell Hodge GC, VRD, DL (23 June 1916 – 4 January 1997) was an officer of the Royal Naval Volunteer Reserve and a recipient of the Empire Gallantry Medal, later exchanged for the George Cross.

== Early life ==
Sandy Hodge was born on 23 June 1916 at Blairgowrie in Scotland. Educated at Fettes College and the University of Edinburgh, he joined the Royal Navy Volunteer Reserve in 1938.

== Second World War ==
Hodge was awarded the Empire Gallantry Medal for bravery while a sub-lieutenant during a naval action on 14 March 1940 when a bomb exploded in a bomb room on HMS Eagle, leaving 13 people dead and one injured: he played a major role in the rescue. The citation for the award read:

H.M. Ship in which Sub-Lieutenant Hodge was serving was badly damaged by an explosion in a bomb-room. The bomb-room was in darkness, full of heat and fumes, and smoke rising to the main deck suggested fire below.

Sub-Lieutenant Hodge had no knowledge of the behaviour of bombs in great heat or violent movement. When the explosion occurred he at once left the main deck and went into the bomb-room. He examined this and was able to rescue and send up several badly injured men. He found one of the wounded men crushed under two very heavy bombs, which could not be moved single-handed. Obtaining help, he dragged the wounded man clear, and sent him up.

Sub-Lieutenant Hodge did not go on deck until he had satisfied himself that no one was left alive below.

Throughout he showed outstanding courage, enterprise and resource, without any thought for himself. He saved all the lives he could though, for all he knew, further fatal explosions might have occurred at any moment.

== Later life ==
After the war he became senior partner of Cowan & Stewart, a firm of lawyers. He also became chairman of Standard Life. He also served as Deputy Lieutenant of Edinburgh, as well as being a member of The Royal Company of Archers.
