= Richard Frank Jolly =

Recipient of the Empire Gallantry Medal

- Born: 28 August 1896; Wandsworth, London, England
- Died: 16 October 1939 (aged 43); Edinburgh, Scotland
- Military career
- Allegiance: United Kingdom
- Branch: Royal Navy
- Service years: 1914–1939
- Rank: Commander
- Conflicts: First World War; Second World War
- Awards: Empire Gallantry Medal

Commander Richard Frank Jolly, EGM (28 August 1896 – 16 October 1939) was a Royal Navy officer and a recipient of the Empire Gallantry Medal.

== Naval career ==
Richard Jolly was born in Wandsworth, London, on 28 August 1896. He was educated at Bedford School, and joined the Royal Navy in September 1914. During the First World War, he served for two years as a midshipman on a battle cruiser before being promoted to lieutenant and transferred to a destroyer. In 1932, he was promoted to the rank of commander.

On 16 October 1939, soon after the outbreak of the Second World War, HMS Mohawk, commanded by Jolly, was patrolling the Firth of Forth, near Edinburgh, when she was attacked by an enemy aircraft, suffering many casualties as a result. Commander Jolly, who was on the bridge, was wounded in the stomach, but refused to leave his post or to receive medical attention, with the words, "Leave me, go and look after the others." He continued to direct the Mohawk for the 35 mile passage, which took eighty minutes, and, although he was too weak for his orders to be heard, they were repeated by his navigating officer, who was also wounded. Five hours after he brought the ship into port, he died, aged 43, and was awarded the Empire Gallantry Medal posthumously. On 24 September 1940, this was exchanged by his family for the George Cross, upon the inauguration of the new medal.
