= Isaac Tomlinson =

English footballer (1880–1970)

Personal information
- Date of birth: 16 April 1880
- Place of birth: Chesterfield, England
- Date of death: 24 August 1970 (aged 90)
- Place of death: Bournemouth, England
- Height: 5 ft 8 in (1.73 m)
- Position: Outside right

Youth career
- 1899–1900: North Wingfield Red Rose

Senior career*
Years	Team	Apps	(Gls)
1900–1903	Chesterfield	58	(9)
1903–1904	Arsenal	0	(0)
1904–1905	Chesterfield	33	(8)
1905–1906	Southampton	29	(8)
1906–1907	Portsmouth	5	(0)
1907–1908	Heart of Midlothian	22	(2)
–	Clay Cross works		
- * Club domestic league appearances and goals

Isaac Tomlinson (16 April 1880 – 24 August 1970) was an English footballer who played at outside-left for various clubs in England and Scotland in the 1900s, spending the largest part of his career with Chesterfield.

== Football career ==
Tomlinson was born in Chesterfield, Derbyshire and, after playing football for a local village team, he joined Chesterfield, then playing in the Football League Second Division in April 1900. After a season spent in the reserves, Tomlinson took over at outside-left for the 1901–02 season, replacing Walter Arnold who had dropped down to non-League football. He only missed one game in the 1902–03 season, scoring seven goals, as Chesterfield finished sixth in the table.

Tomlinson then spent a season with Arsenal without breaking into the first team before returning to his home-town club in June 1904. Another successful season with the Saltergate club ended with a fifth-place league finish, with Tomlinson contributing eight goals from 33 appearances. In an FA Cup match in January 1905, Chesterfield took Portsmouth to a replay in which Tomlinson created a big impression. This drew him to the attention of Ernest Arnfield, secretary-manager of Southampton, who fought off competition from other clubs to eventually secure his services in May 1905.

The "Saints" had finished third in the Southern League in 1904–05 and were anxious to improve on this, having been champions six times in the previous nine years. Tomlinson was recruited to replace Charles Webb who had moved to Scotland in the summer of 1905 and he made his debut in the opening match of the 1905–06 season, a 1–0 defeat against Brentford. Tomlinson was an extremely speedy winger with an accurate shot and his style of play was similar to that of Joe Turner, who had retired a year earlier. Unfortunately, he had an "excitable temperament" and suffered badly from nerves, especially away from The Dell, and he "often failed to deliver the goods on opponents' pitches". His anxiety often resulted in him walking around the ground before kick-off rather than sitting in the changing-room.

Tomlinson only missed a handful of league matches in his one season with Southampton, scoring eight goals from his 29 appearances including a goal in the 9–1 victory over Northampton Town on 27 January 1906, helping the team to the runners-up spot. Tomlinson also appeared in all five FA Cup matches, the first of which came against local rivals, Portsmouth, on 13 January when Tomlinson and Fred Harrison combined on the right-wing to great effect, giving the Portsmouth left-back, George Molyneux, a torrid time with Tomlinson setting up Harrison's second goal with a "perfect centre" and scoring the fifth "with a clinking drive". Saints would go on to reach Round Four, defeating Middlesbrough of the Football League First Division 6–1 in Round Three (with Tomlinson again scoring), before going out to Liverpool.

In the summer of 1906, Tomlinson moved down The Solent to join Portsmouth but managed only five first-team games before trying his luck in Scotland with Heart of Midlothian.

== Later career ==
After retiring from his football career, Tomlinson returned to his home town of Chesterfield where he became a licensee of a pub, before returning to Southern England to settle in Bournemouth, where he managed a hotel, whilst also acting as a scout for Bournemouth & Boscombe Athletic.
