= Thomas McTeague =

Recipient of the Empire Gallantry Medal

Thomas Patrick McTeague
- Thomas McTeague
- Born: 2 October 1893; Belfast
- Died: 28 February 1961 (aged 67); Belfast
- Military career
- Allegiance: United Kingdom
- Branch: Royal Air Force
- Rank: Non Commissioned Officer
- Awards: George Cross; Distinguished Conduct Medal

Thomas Patrick McTeague GC DCM (2 October 1893 – 28 February 1961) was a recipient of the George Cross and an NCO in the Royal Air Force (RAF).

== Life ==
'Tommy' McTeague was born on 2 October 1893 in Belfast. At the outbreak of the First World War in 1914 he joined the Royal Irish Rifles, and in 1917 was awarded the Distinguished Conduct Medal for bravery. After demobilisation in 1919, he joined the RAF and became an air gunner in twin engine bi-planes. By 1928 he was a corporal serving in the RAF Armament and Gunnery School in Kent. He continued to serve in the RAF, retiring as a Warrant Officer, and then working as a civilian at the RAF Careers Office in Northern Ireland for some years. McTeague died on 28 February 1961 in Belfast and was buried in Milltown Cemetery.

=== Medal action ===
On 10 December 1928 Pilot Officer, later Air Chief Marshall, Sir Hugh Constantine, while flying a Siskin fighter aircraft off Leysdown on the Isle of Sheppey in Kent, crashed into the sea, about 200 yards from the shore. In cold and rough conditions, Corporal McTeague and Flying Officer Walter Anderson swam from the shore to Constantine who was in a state of collapse. Through their combined efforts McTeague and Anderson were able to bring Constantine back to the land.

Both McTeague and Anderson were awarded the Empire Gallantry Medal, converted into the George Cross when that award was instituted in 1940. In 1942, accompanied by Anderson, McTeague attended an investiture at Buckingham Palace for the George Cross.

==== Citation ====
Pilot Officer H.A. Constantine while flying an aeroplane off Leysdown on 10 December 1928, crashed into the sea, about 200 yards from shore. Corporal McTeague and Flying Officer Anderson immediately entered the sea from the shore and swam to his assistance. The weather was bitterly cold; an on-shore wind was blowing and the sea was fairly rough. Constantine, fully clothed and suffering from injuries and shock, commenced to swim ashore, but was in a state of collapse when the first swimmer (McTeague) reached him. McTeague, though exhausted himself, supported him until the arrival of Anderson, and Constantine was then brought to safety (this involving swimming for a distance of about 100 yards) by their combined efforts.
The extremely prompt and timely action of Anderson and McTeague, and the gallantry and persistence they displayed, undoubtedly saved the life of Constantine.

The London Gazette, 12 April 1929.
