= William Neil McKechnie =

Recipient of the Empire Gallantry Medal

- Born: 27 August 1907; Kasauli, India
- Died: 30 August 1944 (aged 37); Pakorber, Germany
- Military career
- Allegiance: United Kingdom
- Branch: Royal Air Force
- Service years: 1929–1944
- Rank: Group Captain
- Service number: 26144
- Commands: No. 27 Squadron RAF
- Conflicts: North-West Frontier; Second World War
- Awards: George Cross

Group Captain William Neil McKechnie, GC (27 August 1907 – 30 August 1944) was a pilot and senior commander in the Royal Air Force. He was awarded the Empire Gallantry Medal in 1929, which was exchanged for the George Cross in 1940. He was killed in action over Germany in 1944.

== Early life ==
William Neil McKechnie was born on 27 August 1907 in Kasauli, India, the son of Lieutenant Colonel William Ernest McKechnie, Indian Medical Service, and Marion A. McKechnie. He attended The Perse School in Cambridge.

McKechnie later married Mary Roma Doig of Musselburgh, Midlothian.

== Empire Gallantry Medal ==
McKechnie earned the Empire Gallantry Medal for an act of bravery in saving Flight Cadet C. J. Giles after an aeroplane crash on 20 June 1929 while still a flight cadet aged 22.

The London Gazette of 18 October 1929, gives the following details in announcing the award to Group Captain McKechnie of the Empire Gallantry Medal:

On 20 June 1929, an aeroplane piloted by Flight Cadet C. J. Giles crashed on landing at RAF College Cranwell and burst into flames. The pilot was stunned but managed to release his safety belt and fall out of the machine in a dazed condition. Flight Cadet McKechnie, who had landed in another aeroplane about the same time some two hundred yards away, left his machine and ran at full speed towards the scene of the accident. The petrol had spread over an area about ten yards in diameter, in full blaze, with Giles lying in it semi-conscious. McKechnie, without hesitation, ran into the flames and pulled out Giles, who was badly burned. McKechnie, who was himself scorched and superficially burned, then proceeded to extinguish Giles's burning clothing. There is no doubt that without McKechnie's assistance Giles would have been burned to death, as he was quite incapable of moving himself. His machine was entirely destroyed, and the ground for some distance around was burned up by the spread of the ignited petrol.

McKechnie's Empire Gallantry Medal was exchanged for the George Cross in 1940.

== RAF career ==
McKechnie attended RAF College Cranwell.

In January 1939, he was commanding No. 27 Squadron RAF at Kohat, India.

During the Second World War, McKechnie was a group captain based at RAF Metheringham with No. 106 Squadron RAF from 11 November 1943 until his death. He was involved in the Battle of Berlin in which he flew in an Avro Lancaster that completed thirteen operations against Berlin and four other operations over Germany, when the plane was lost it had flown 638.05 hours. Their eighteenth, and final flight, on 29 August 1944, was an operation over Königsberg where No. 106 Squadron lost two planes, including McKechnie's, without a trace. The Commonwealth War Graves Commission lists McKechnie's date of death as 30 August 1944.

Those killed in action were:

- G/C W.N.McKechnie GC
- Sgt R.B.Clarke
- F/S H.W.T.Carter RCAF
- F/O E.E.Fletcher
- Sgt C.C.Jeffrey
- Sgt D.Forster
- F/S E.L.Collins

There is no known grave for McKechnie or any members of his crew, but they are commemorated on Runnymede Memorial panel 200, Surrey.
