= Guy Branch =

Royal Air Force officer

Guy Rawstron Branch
- Born: 27 October 1913; London, England
- Died: 11 August 1940 (aged 26); English Channel, off Cherbourg, France
- Military career
- Allegiance: United Kingdom
- Branch: Royal Air Force
- Service years: 1937–1940
- Rank: Flying Officer
- Service number: 90137
- Units: No. 601 Squadron RAF; No. 145 Squadron RAF
- Conflicts: Second World War: Battle of Britain †
- Awards: Empire Gallantry Medal

Guy Rawstron Branch, EGM (27 October 1913 – 11 August 1940) was a Royal Air Force fighter pilot and one of "The Few". He was killed in action on 11 August 1940. His death occurred before the introduction of the George Cross but unlike Herbert John Mahoney GC awarded the Empire Gallantry Medal in 1927, the next-of-kin of Branch did not receive the insignia of the George Cross.

== Early life ==
Branch was born on 27 October 1913 in London, the son of Charles Churchill Branch and Mary Madelaine Bernadette Branch (née Rawstron). He was educated at Eton College and Balliol College, Oxford. On 7 May 1937 he was commissioned as a pilot officer in the Royal Auxiliary Air Force. On 25 March 1939 in Lewes he married Lady Prudence Mary Pelham, daughter of the 6th Earl of Chichester.

== Accident and award ==
On 8 January 1938 Branch was a student pilot was flying as a passenger in a Hawker Demon with Pilot Officer Crawley when it crashed and burst into flames at RAF Upavon. Branch escaped but then returned to the aircraft to free the trapped pilot and pull him clear. For his actions he was awarded the Empire Gallantry Medal on 25 March 1938, the citation reading:

On 9th January, 1938 an aircraft in which Pilot Officer Branch was a passenger crashed at Upavon, Wiltshire, and immediately burst into flames. Having extricated himself from the burning aircraft this officer found that the pilot was trapped in the cockpit by his legs. Despite the danger of the petrol tank exploding, Pilot Officer Branch returned to the blazing wreckage and, whilst actually standing on burning debris, succeeded in extracting the pilot. There is little doubt that this prompt and gallant act saved the pilot's life. The aircraft was completely destroyed by fire.

== Battle of Britain ==
During the Battle of Britain Branch, by then a flying officer, was a Hawker Hurricane pilot with No. 145 Squadron RAF. On 8 August 1940 he was credited with destroying two Junkers Ju 87s. A few days later on 11 August 1940 while flying Hurricane serial number P9251 on a mission to intercept German bombers, a large air battle took place off Cherbourg in which Branch was shot down and killed.

Branch was buried in the churchyard at Quiberville, France. His name recorded on the Battle of Britain Monument in London, and at the Battle of Britain Memorial, Capel-le-Ferne.
