= Walter Arnold (GC) =

- Born: 30 August 1906
- Died: 12 March 1988 (aged 81)
- Military career
- Allegiance: Great Britain
- Branch: Royal Air Force
- Rank: Leading Aircraftman
- Awards: Empire Gallantry Medal exchanged for George Cross

Walter Arnold GC (30 August 1906 – 12 March 1988) was a recipient of the Empire Gallantry Medal (later exchanged for the George Cross) and a Royal Air Force airman.

On 20 June 1928, Leading Aircraftman Arnold was a passenger in an aircraft which crashed on landing at Digby Aerodrome. Arnold was able to free himself from the burning wreckage but he re-entered the flames in order to rescue the unconscious pilot. In doing so, Arnold sustained burns to his face, neck and hands and his actions undoubtedly saved the pilot's life.

== Citation ==
"The KING has been graciously pleased to approve of the Award of the Medal of the Military Division of the Most Excellent Order of the British Empire to the undermentioned : —

For Gallantry.

No. 363339 Leading Aircraftman Walter Arnold, Royal Air Force, for conspicuous gallantry displayed at Digby Aerodrome on the 20th June, 1928.

This airman was a passenger in a machine which was wrecked upon landing and immediately caught fire. Arnold extricated himself from the burning wreckage and, although fully aware of the grave risk he was taking, re-entered the flames and succeeded in dragging the pilot, who was unconscious and very severely injured, to a position of safety.

Arnold sustained burns to his face, neck and hands, and his prompt and courageous action undoubtedly saved the pilot's life, since the burning petrol spread rapidly and rendered any subsequent approach to the wreckage impossible."
