= Harry Clarke (footballer, born 1875) =

English footballer

Personal information
- Full name: Harold Clarke
- Date of birth: 1875
- Place of birth: Walsall, England
- Position: Centre forward

Senior career*
Years	Team	Apps	(Gls)
1895–1898	Skerton		
1898–1899	Everton	12	(2)
1899–1900	Portsmouth		
1901–1902	Burton United	31	(9)
1902–1903	Walsall		
1904	Crewe Alexandra		
Total		43	(11)
- * Club domestic league appearances and goals

Harold Clarke (1875 – after 1903) was an English footballer who played in the Football League for Burton United and Everton.
