= Walter Arnold (footballer) =

English footballer (1876–1955)

Personal information
- Full name: Walter Arnold
- Date of birth: 13 January 1876
- Place of birth: Brimington, England
- Date of death: 1955 (aged 78–79)
- Position: Winger

Senior career*
Years	Team	Apps	(Gls)
1898–1899	New Whittington Exchange		
1899–1901	Chesterfield Town	41	(4)
1901–1902	New Whittington Exchange		
1902–1903	Denaby United		
1903–1904	Chesterfield Town	19	(3)
1904–1906	Denaby United		
1906–1908	Chesterfield Town	49	(1)
1908–1909	Mexborough Town		
1910	New Whittington Exchange		
Total		109	(8)
- * Club domestic league appearances and goals

Walter Arnold (13 January 1876–1955) was an English footballer who played in the Football League for Chesterfield Town.
