= Empire Gallantry Medal =

British medal (1922–1940)

Medal of the Most Excellent Order of the British Empire for Gallantry
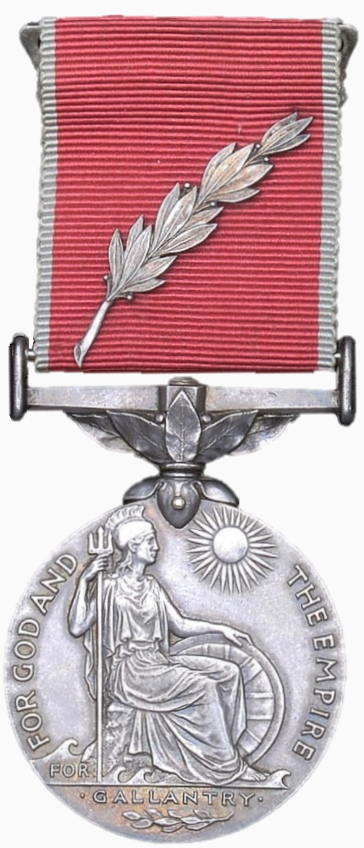
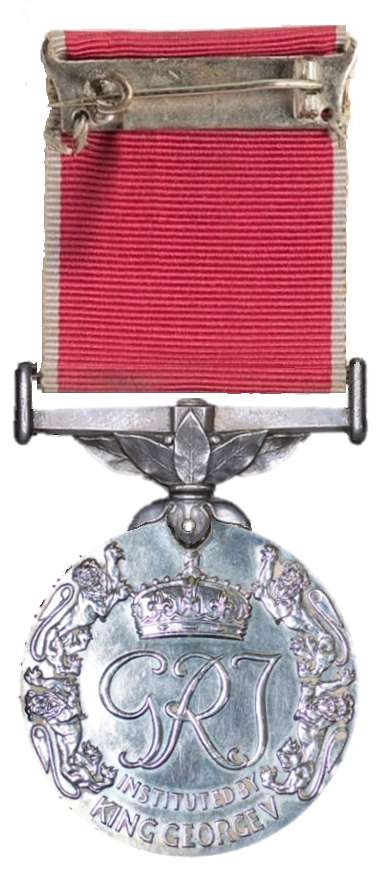
- Empire Gallantry Medal (George VI reverse)
- Type: Bravery decoration
- Description: Circular silver medal
- Presented by: United Kingdom of Great Britain and Northern Ireland
- Eligibility: British and Commonwealth subjects
- Status: Ceased by Royal Warrant on 24 September 1940
- Established: 29 December 1922
- First award: 1 January 1923

Highlights
- Total: 130
- Total awarded posthumously: 8
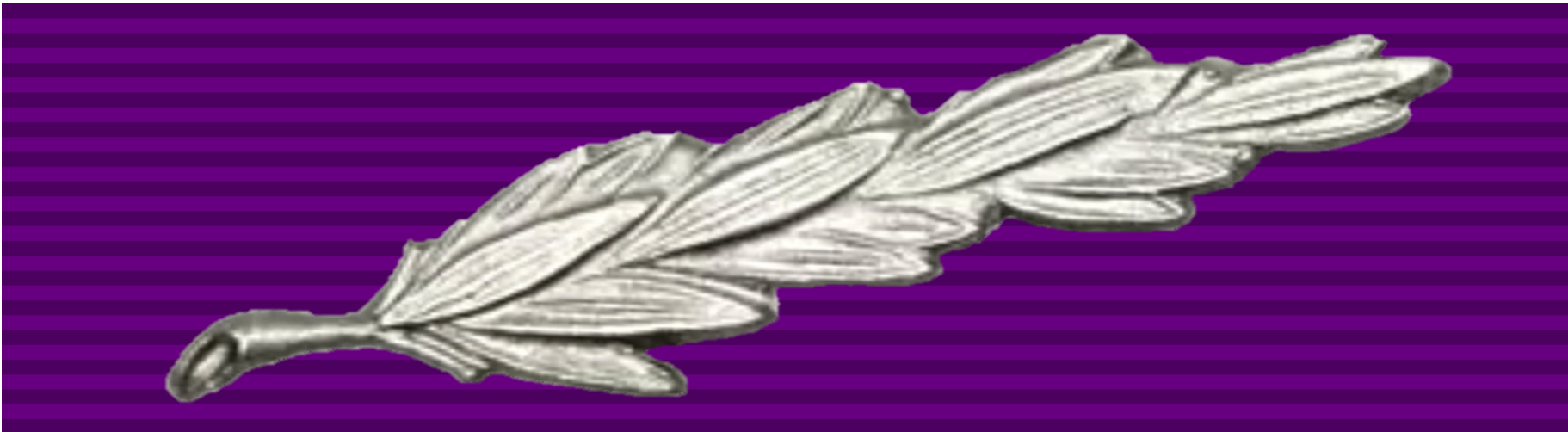
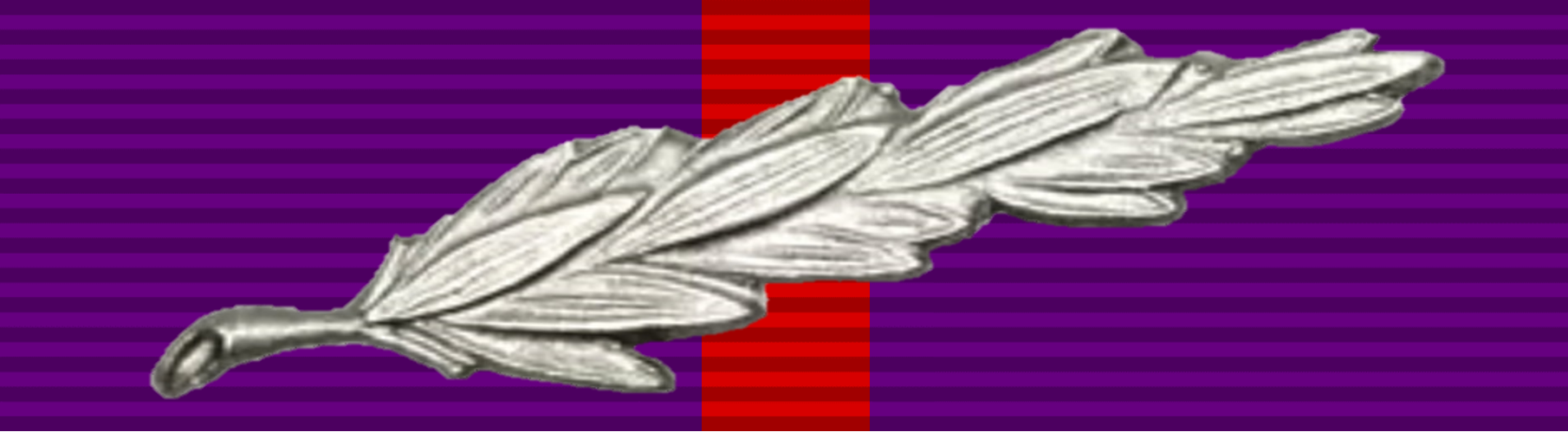
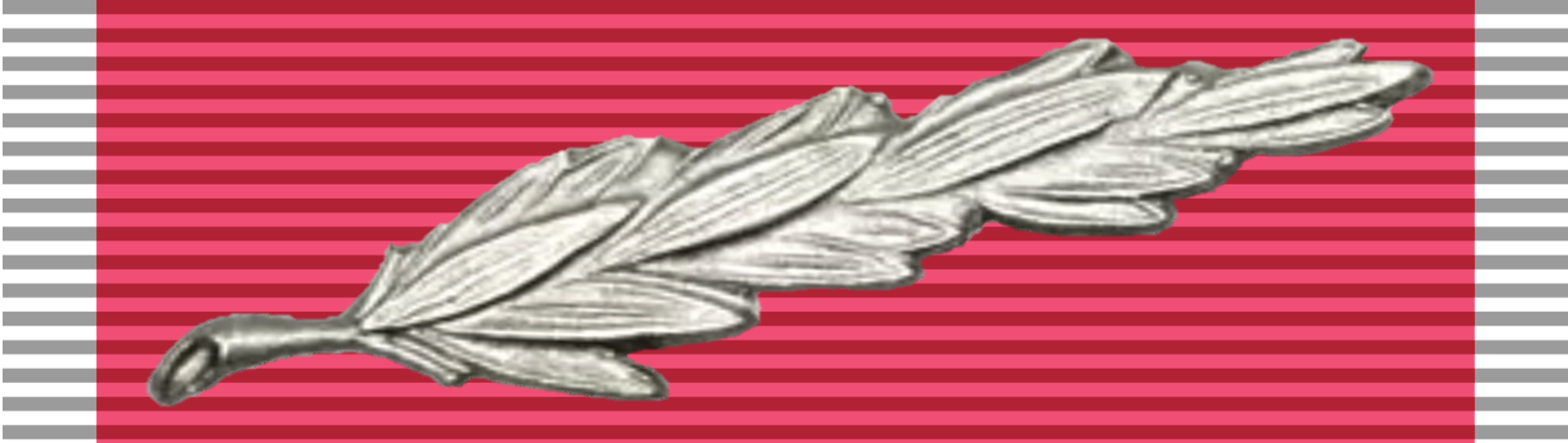
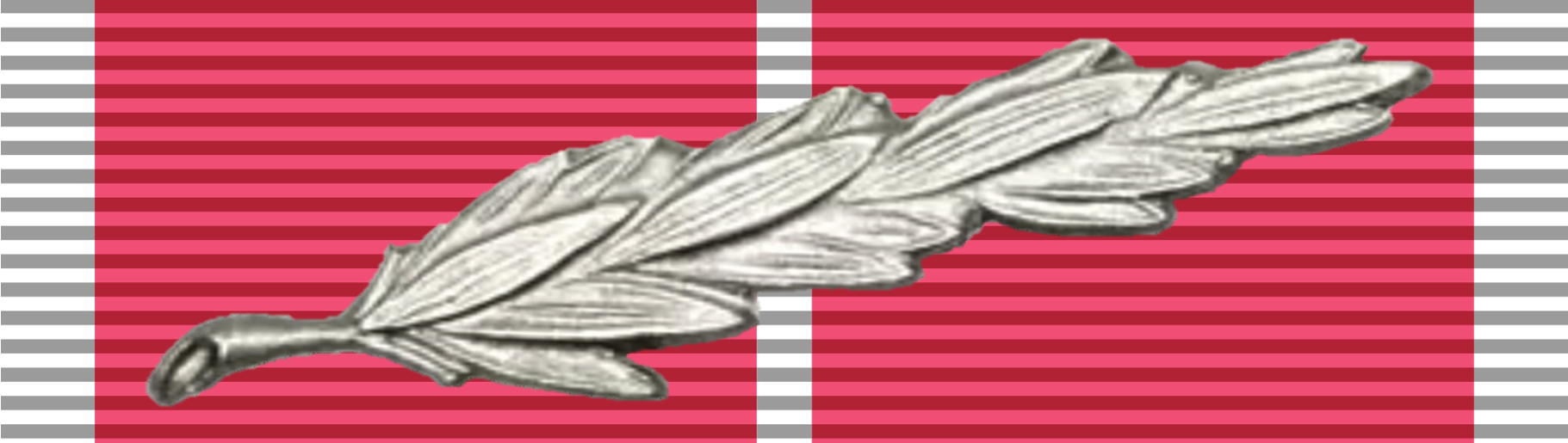
- Ribbon bar: Civil and Military EGM (to 1937). Silver laurel branch added 1933 Ribbon bar: Civil and Military EGM (1937–40).

1936 Order of Wear
- Next (higher): Kings' Police Medal
- Next (lower): Indian Police Medal

The Medal of the Most Excellent Order of the British Empire for Gallantry, known as the Empire Gallantry Medal (EGM), was a British medal awarded for acts of gallantry. Unlike the then existing Sea Gallantry Medal (SGM) (1854), the Albert Medal (AM) (1866) and the Edward Medal (EM) (1907) which each had two classes with restricted eligibility criteria, the EGM was a single class award with wide eligibility. It was instituted by King George V on 29 December 1922. In July 1937, recipients were granted the right to use the post-nominal letters "EGM". The EGM was superseded in 1940 by the George Cross which is also a single class award with wide eligibility but unlike the low placed EGM on the Order of Wear, the George Cross is listed immediately after the Victoria Cross.

The EGM was a medal of the Order of the British Empire and like the Order itself, was divided into civil and military divisions, but unlike the British Empire Medal (BEM), officers were eligible for the medal.

== History ==
In 1922, the original Medal of the Order of the British Empire was discontinued and replaced by two separate awards, the Medal of the Order of the British Empire for Gallantry (EGM), and the Medal of the Order of the British Empire for Meritorious Service, known as the British Empire Medal. The EGM had been ranked after the SGM, AM and EM on the Order of Wear but was superseded by the George Cross in 1940.

On 24 September 1940 King George VI created the George Cross, to rank immediately after the Victoria Cross, to recognize gallantry not in the presence of the enemy. The EGM ceased the same day. In April 1941, it was announced that, except for honorary recipients, all living recipients and the next-of-kin of those posthumously awarded the EGM after 3 September 1939, were to exchange their insignia for the George Cross. In 1971, all living recipients of the Albert Medal and Edward Medal were deemed George Cross holders but unlike EGM recipients the exchange of their original insignia for the George Cross was optional.

== Appearance ==
It is a circular silver medal, 36 millimetres (1.4 in) in diameter, with a straight suspender augmented with laurel leaves. The recipient's name was impressed on the rim. Except for the ribbon, the design of the civil and military divisions was the same.

The obverse showed Britannia facing right, her left and resting on a shield and right hand holding a trident, with a sun in the upper right corner. The wording "For God and the Empire" was inscribed round the upper side, and "For Gallantry" in the exergue.

The first reverse had the Royal Cypher surrounded by six lions. The 2nd type, adopted after the accession of George VI in 1937, had the Royal Cypher with four lions, two on either side with, below, the wording "Instituted by George V".

The original ribbon was plain purple, with the addition of a thin vertical red stripe for military awards. A silver laurel branch was added diagonally to the ribbon for both types of the award in 1933, and was worn on the ribbon bar when ribbons alone were worn. The ribbon changed to rose pink with pearl grey edges in July 1937, with an addition pearl grey vertical stripe for military awards, and stayed in this version until the medal's revocation.

== Statistics ==
There were a total of 130 awards, including eight made posthumously:

- Civil Division 64 (3 posthumous)
- Military Division 62 (5 posthumous)
- Honorary awards 4 (non-British citizens, 3 French and 1 Belgian)

The four honorary awards were not able to be exchanged for the George Cross. On 24 September 1940, 107 of the other 126 recipients were living and all exchanged awards. The next of kin of five deceased recipients, Herbert John (Bertie) Mahoney whose EGM award was gazetted on 23 December 1927 and the four Military Division posthumous awards gazetted after the start of World War II also exchanged awards.

== Selected recipients ==
Awards of the EGM that were not exchanged for the George Cross are marked below with (*).

Empire Gallantry Medal recipients
Name	Rank (or Role)	Organisation	Date gazetted	Image
Walter Anderson	Flying Officer	Royal Air Force	12 April 1929	—
Walter Arnold	Leading Aircraftman	Royal Air Force	9 November 1928	—
Henry George Blogg	Coxswain	Cromer Lifeboat	30 June 1924	
Theodore Bogdanovitch	Mulazim (Lieutenant)	Trans-Jordan Frontier Force	30 June 1939	—
Guy Branch (*)	Pilot Officer	Royal Air Force (Auxiliary Air Force)	30 June 1939	—
William Fleming	Coxswain	Gorleston Lifeboat	30 June 1924	
Abdus-Samad Golandaz	Landlord, Property Owner and Sand Contractor	—	4 June 1934	
Alexander Mitchell Hodge	Sub Lieutenant	Royal Navy	14 March 1940	—
Richard Frank Jolly	Commander	Royal Navy	23 December 1939	—
Cecil Kelly	Barge pilot	—	5 February 1937	—
Alfred Lungley	Lance Sergeant	British Army	19 November 1935	—
Frederick Hamilton March	Chauffeur	—	5 December 1924	
William Neil McKechnie	Flight Cadet	Royal Air Force	18 October 1929	—
Thomas Patrick McTeague	Corporal	Royal Air Force	12 April 1929	—
Joan Daphne Mary Pearson	Corporal	Women's Auxiliary Air Force	19 July 1940	
Patrick Gordon Taylor	Captain	Aus-NZ Airmail Flight	9 July 1937	
Dorothy Louise Thomas	Nurse	Middlesex Hospital	2 March 1934	—
James Gordon Melville Turner	Radio Officer	Merchant Navy	13 October 1939	—
