= Frampton (surname) =

Frampton is an English surname. Notable people with the surname include:

- Adam Frampton (born 1980), American architect
- Alan Frampton (1929–2026), New Zealand agricultural economist
- Andy Frampton (born 1979), English footballer
- Billy Frampton (born 1996), Australian rules footballer
- Bob Frampton (1929–2001), Canadian ice hockey player
- Carl Frampton (born 1987) British professional boxer
- Cherry Frampton (born 1987), British glamour model
- Christabel Frampton (1863–1951), British painter
- Dia Frampton (born 1987), American musician
- Edward Reginald Frampton (1870–1923), English painter
- Eric Frampton (born 1984), American football player
- George Frampton (1860–1928), British sculptor
- George T. Frampton (born 1944), American attorney
- Hollis Frampton (1936–1984), American filmmaker
- John Frampton (16th century), English merchant and translator
- Jordan Frampton (born 1985), British speedway rider
- Kenneth Frampton (born 1930), British architect
- Lorna Frampton (1920–2009), English backstroke swimmer
- Mia Rose Frampton (born 1996), American actress, daughter of Peter Frampton
- Mary Frampton (1773–1846), English diarist and botanist
- Mary Nogueras Frampton (1930–2006), American photographers
- Mary Featherstonhaugh Frampton (1928–2014), British civil servant
- Meredith Frampton (1894–1984), British painter
- Owen Frampton (1919–2005), English art teacher
- Paul Frampton (born 1943), British theoretical physicist
- Peter Frampton (born 1950), British singer-songwriter
- Peter Frampton (make-up artist), British makeup artist
- Robert Frampton (1622–1708), Bishop of Gloucester
- Roger Frampton (1948–2000), Australian jazz pianist
- Stephen Frampton (born 1969), Irish hurler
- Tregonwell Frampton (1641–1727), English racehorse trainer
- Tyron Frampton (born 1994), British rapper performing as Slowthai
