= Mary Frampton (disambiguation) =

Mary Frampton may refer to:

- Mary Featherstonhaugh Frampton (1928–2014), British civil servant
- Mary Frampton (1773–1846), British writer
- Mary Nogueras Frampton (1930–2006), American photographer
