= Frampton =

Frampton, meaning "farmstead on the River Frome", may refer to:

== Places ==
- Frampton, New South Wales, Australia
- Frampton, Quebec, Canada

=== United Kingdom ===
- Frampton, Dorset
- Frampton, Lincolnshire
- Frampton on Severn, Gloucestershire
- Frampton, Vale of Glamorgan
- Frampton (liberty)

== Other uses ==
- Frampton (surname)
- Frampton (album), album by Peter Frampton
