= Peter Frampton (disambiguation) =

Peter Frampton (born 1950) is an English singer-songwriter.

Peter Frampton may also refer to:

- Peter Frampton (album), a 1994 album by the singer
- Peter Frampton (make-up artist), Academy Award winning make-up artist of Braveheart

== See also ==
- Frampton (disambiguation)
