= Clouds Hill =

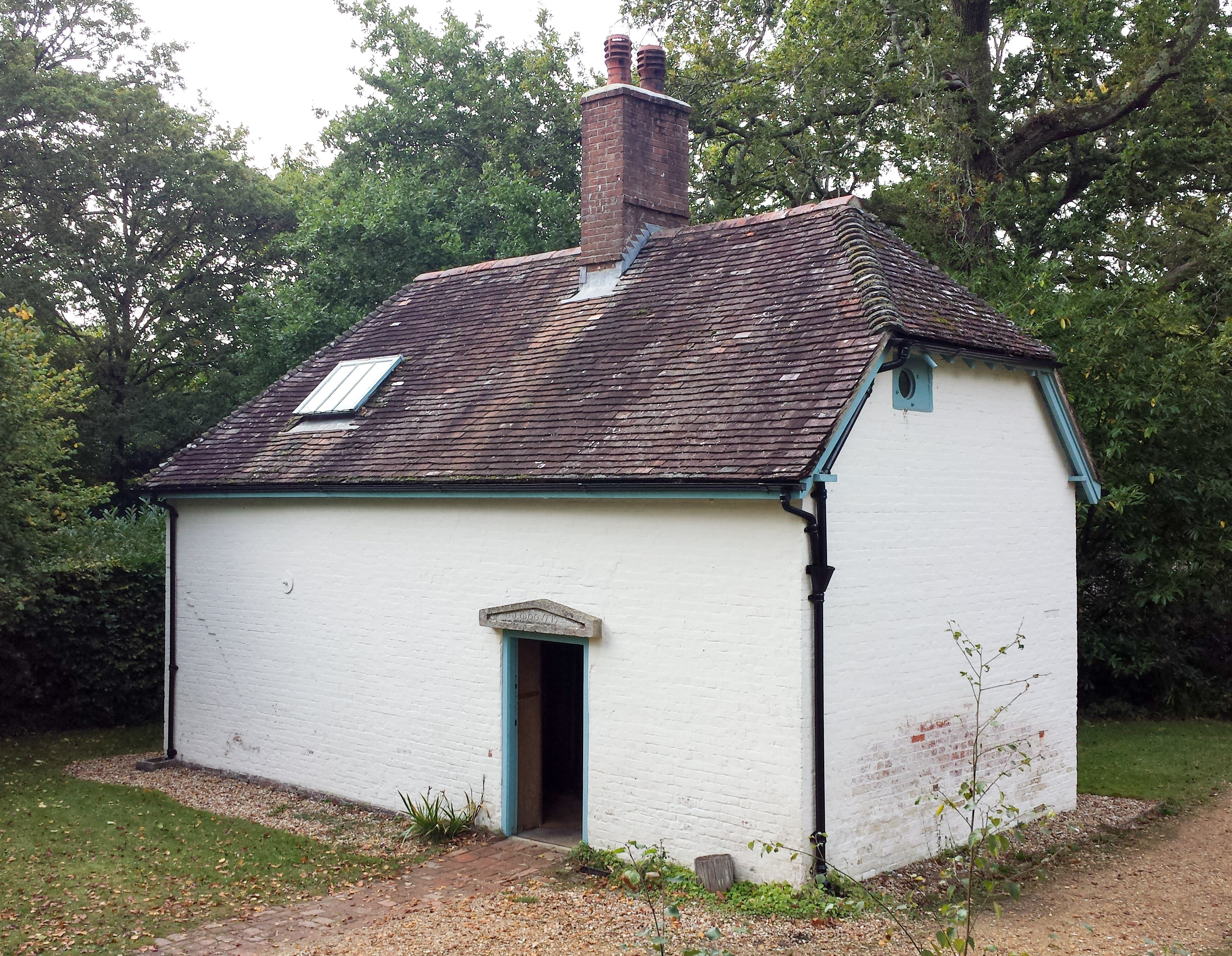
- The front of Clouds Hill in 2013

- Location within Dorset

General information
- Type: Cottage
- Location: near Wareham, Dorset
- Coordinates: 50.7176°N 2.2510°W
- Completed: 19th century
- Owner: National Trust

Website
- https://www.nationaltrust.org.uk/clouds-hill

Clouds Hill is an isolated early 19th-century cottage near Wareham in the county of Dorset in South West England. It is the former home of T. E. Lawrence. The cottage is a Grade II* listed building and is owned by the National Trust.

== History ==
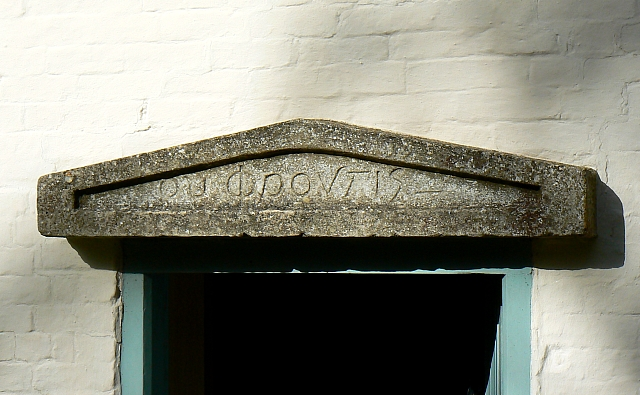
The carving of οὐ φροντὶς over the doorway

The small building has colourwashed brick walls and a tiled roof. It was probably built as a forester's or labourer's cottage in 1808 but was largely reconstructed in 1922-34 by T. E. Lawrence ("Lawrence of Arabia") for himself. The lintel over the door bears a Greek inscription οὐ φροντὶς ("why worry"). The site was in the parish of Turners Puddle in Purbeck District. As "Clouds Hill (Lawrence of Arabia's Cottage)", it is now a Grade II* listed building; it was upgraded from Grade II in 2015.

Lawrence first rented the cottage in 1923 while stationed at nearby Bovington Camp with the Tank Corps. He made it habitable with the help of a friend, then bought it in 1925 and used it as a holiday home. He described it as an earthly paradise and wrote "Nothing in Clouds Hill is to be a care upon the world. While I have it there shall be nothing exquisite or unique in it. Nothing to anchor me." The cottage had no electric lights and three living rooms, described as an eating room, book room and music room. For heat insulation Lawrence had the eating room lined with asbestos that was covered in aluminium foil, and he kept his food under bell jars; a ship’s porthole, from the broken-up HMS Tiger, was installed in 1935. In the book room he installed a large leather divan, and in the music room above it he had his gramophone "with a huge amplifier horn", a leather sofa and chair. In a 1934 letter to Francis Rodd, Lawrence (who had changed his surname to Shaw) described his home thus:

"The cottage has two rooms, one, upstairs, for music (a gramophone and records) and one downstairs for books. There is a bath in a demi-cupboard. For food one goes a mile, to Bovington (near the Tank Corps Depot) and at sleep time I take a great sleeping bag... and spread it on what seems the nicest floor... The cottage looks simple outside, and does no hurt to its setting which is twenty miles of broken heath and a river valley filled with rhododendrons run wild. I think everything, inside and outside my place, approaches perfection... Yours ever, T. E. Shaw"

In 1935 Lawrence left the Royal Air Force and lived at Clouds Hill. A few weeks later, at the age of 46, he suffered injuries in a motorcycle accident close to the cottage, and died in the Bovington Camp hospital on 19 May 1935. The following year, his heir, his brother A. W. Lawrence, gave Clouds Hill to the National Trust. It is now a museum, dedicated to Lawrence. It is open to visitors from March to the beginning of October.

The cottage remains largely as Lawrence left it at his death. It features an exhibition detailing Lawrence's life, and most of his original furniture and possessions. The cottage reflects his complex personality and links to the Middle East. In it is displayed a painting by Henry Scott Tuke of a soldier cadet, possibly Lawrence, at Newporth Beach.

The circular Lawrence of Arabia Trail starts and finishes at Bovington's The Tank Museum, taking in Clouds Hill and the churchyard of St Nicholas' Church in Moreton, where Lawrence is buried.

== Sleeping bags ==
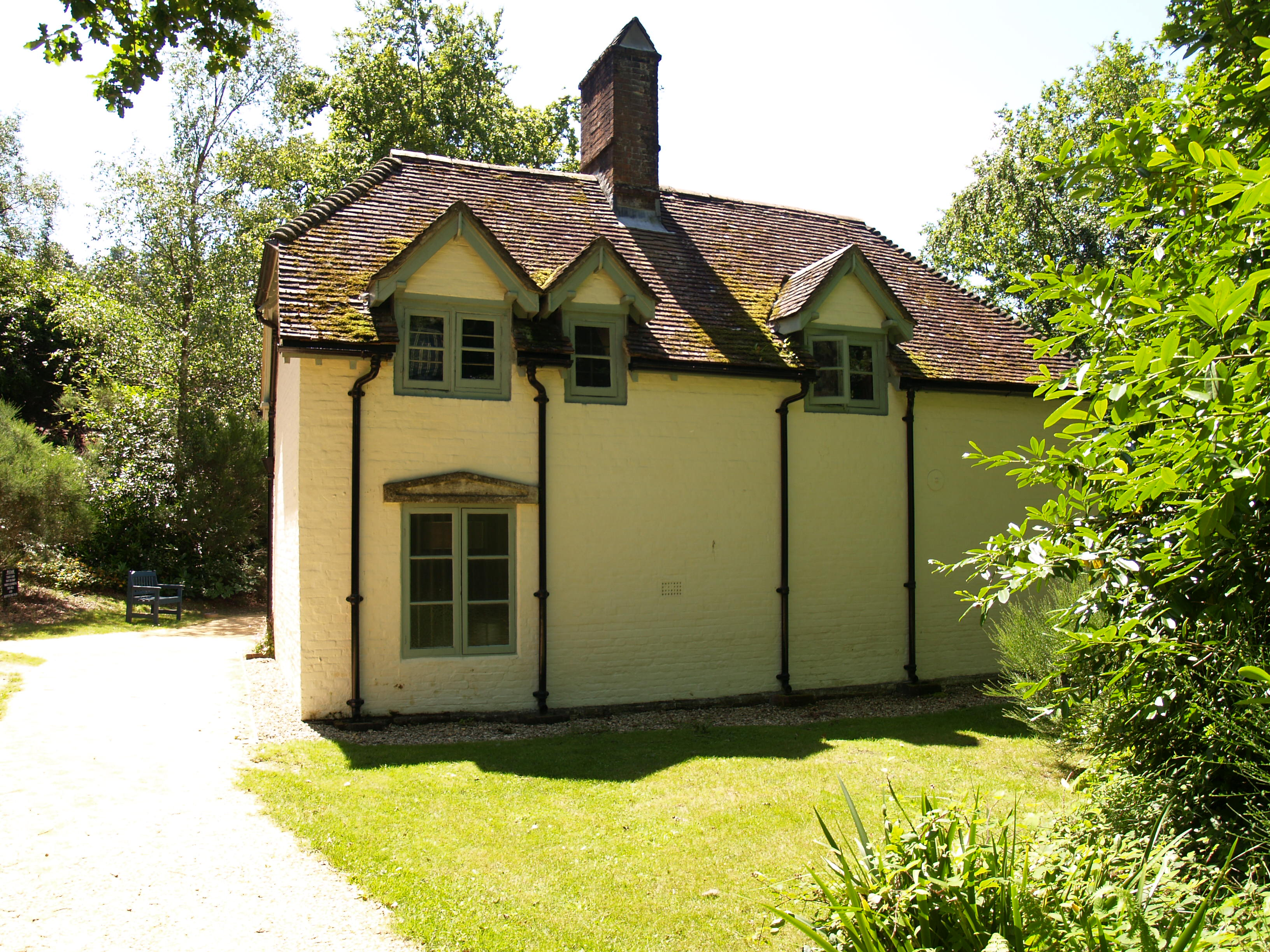
The rear of the cottage

Lawrence reserved a sleeping bag for visitors who stayed overnight. His own sleeping bag was marked meum ('mine' in Latin) and the bag for a guest, tuum ('yours'). According to Jeremy Wilson, Lawrence's biographer, tuum's occupants included George Bernard Shaw, E. M. Forster and Robert Graves. In 1965 the visitor's bag was stolen. Its disappearance coincided with the release of the film Lawrence of Arabia and it was thought the theft could have been inspired by the publicity generated by the film. In 2001, the sleeping bag was returned anonymously from Belgium.

== Gallery ==
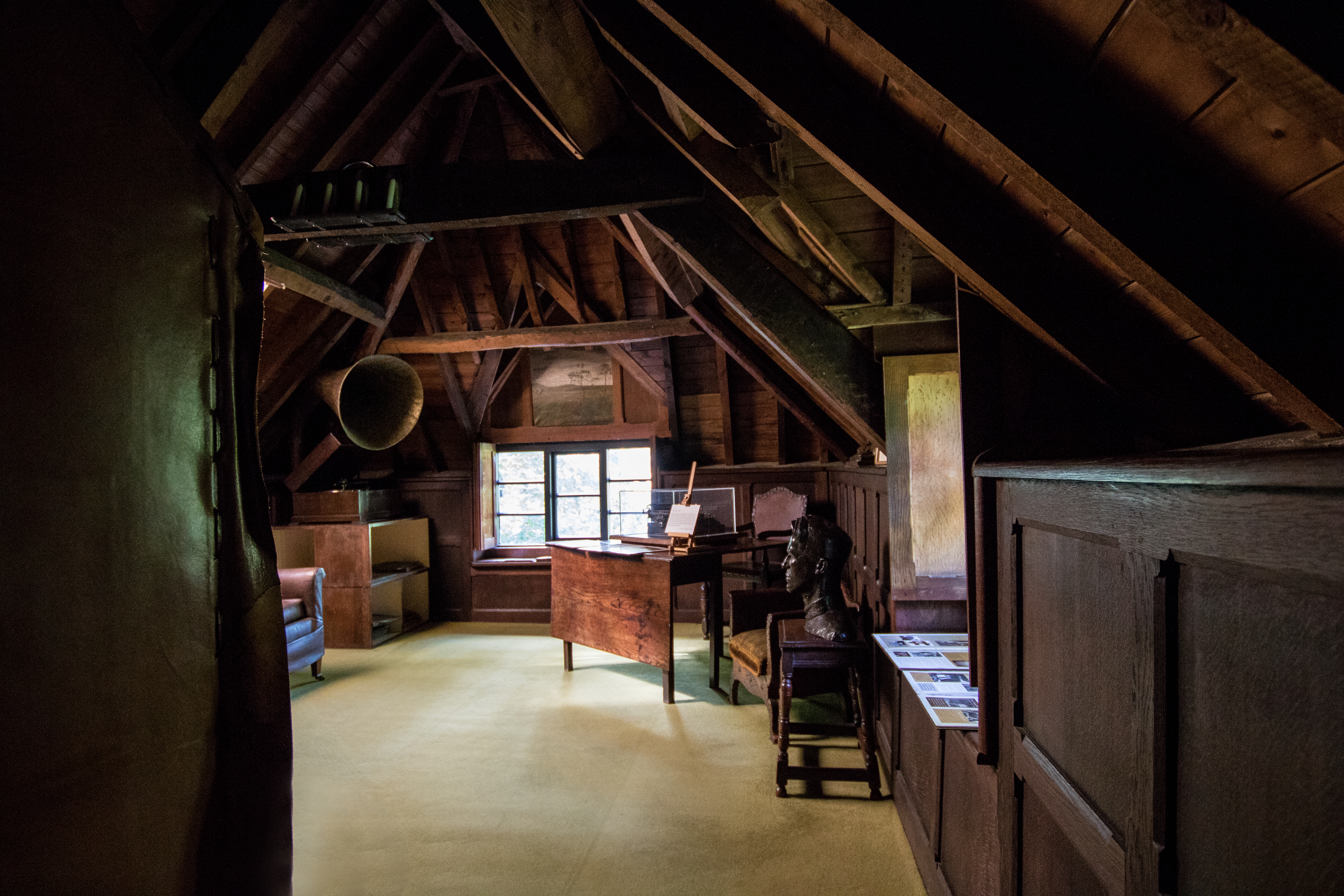
The Music Room

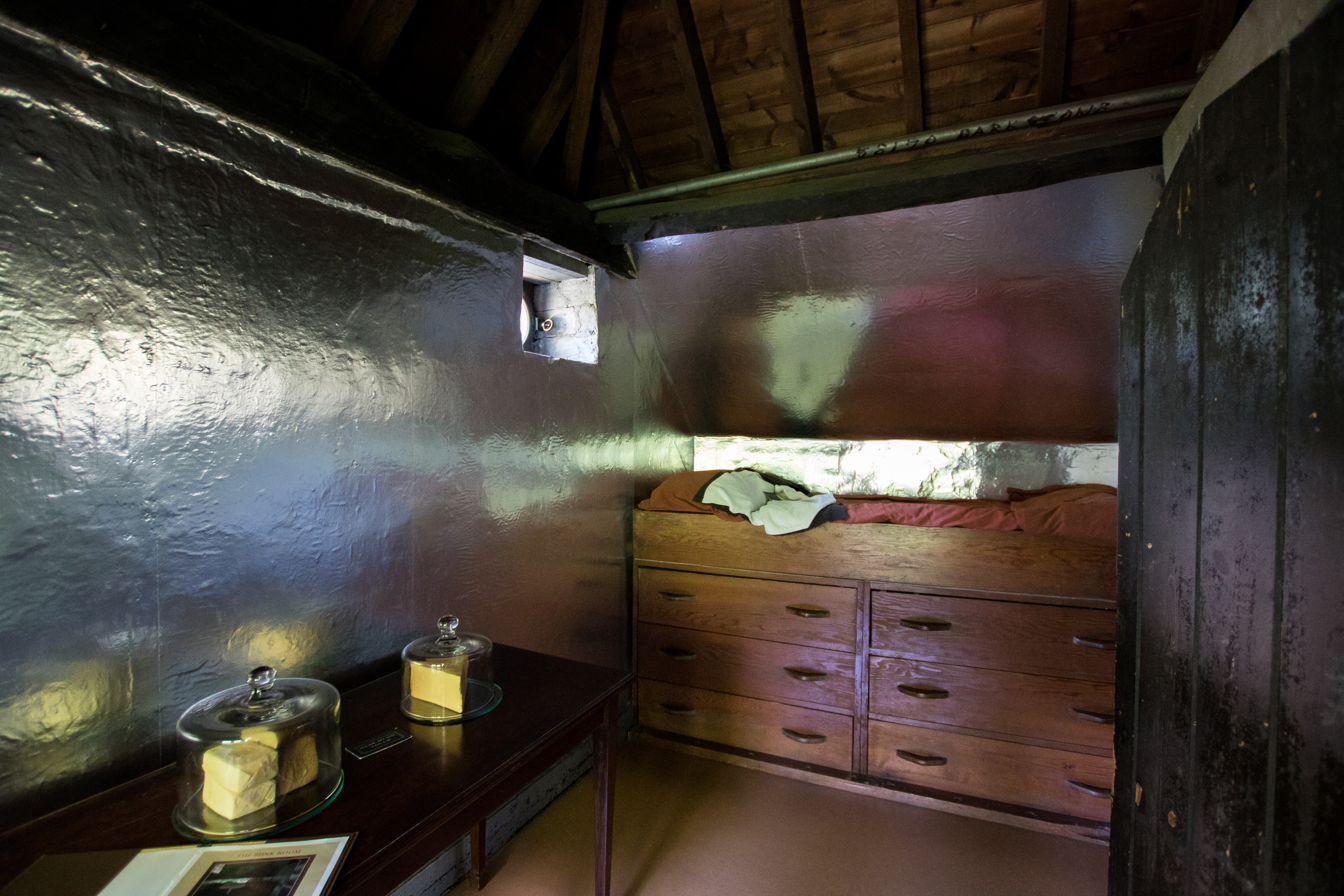
The Bunk Room

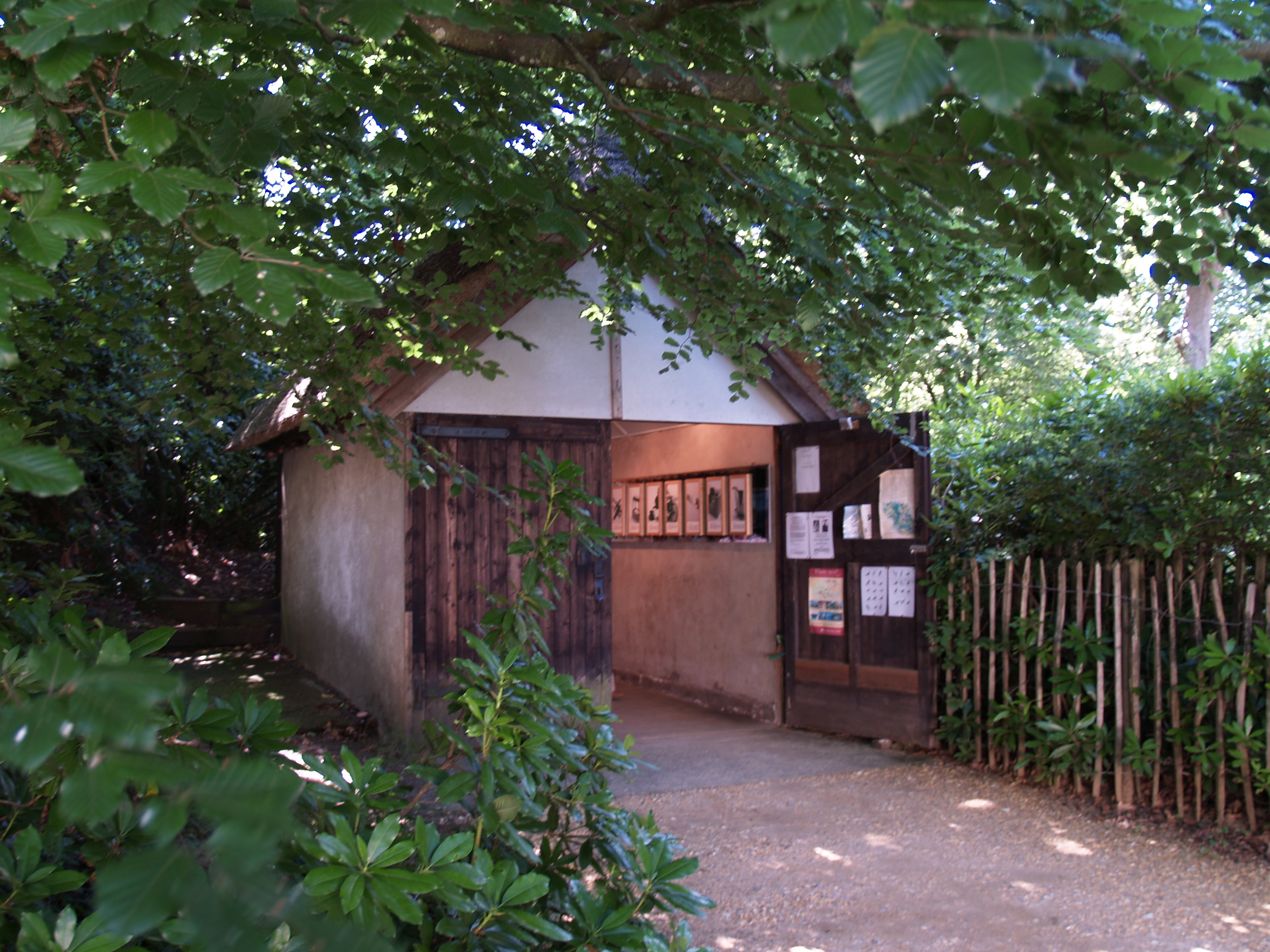
The thatched garage of Clouds Hill, built in 1930, containing an exhibition on the life of Lawrence

== See also ==
- Writer's home
