= Agnes Miller Parker =

Scottish engraver, illustrator and painter

- Portrait study of Agnes Miller Parker by William McCance
- Born: 3 April 1895; Irvine, Ayrshire, Scotland
- Died: 15 November 1980 (aged 85); Greenock, Scotland
- Education: Glasgow School of Art
- Known for: Illustration
- Spouse: William McCance (m. 1918)

Agnes Miller Parker (1895–1980) was a Scottish engraver, illustrator and painter in oil and tempera. Born in Ayrshire, she spent most of her career in London and southern Britain. She is especially known as a twentieth century wood-engraver thanks to her collaboration with H. E. Bates, which resulted in two outstanding wood engraved books: Through the Woods (1936) and Down the River (1937), published by Victor Gollancz.

== Biography ==
Agnes Miller Parker (name on birth certificate Agnes Millar Parker) was born on 3 April 1895 at Irvine, Ayrshire, Scotland. She studied at the Glasgow School of Art from 1911 to 1917, and during that time resided with her family in Riddrie. She subsequently joined the staff of the School for a short period.

In 1918 she married the painter William McCance; thereafter, she passed most of her career in London and southern Britain. In 1955 they separated and Parker moved to Glasgow. They officially divorced in 1963 when she went to live in Lamlash on the Isle of Arran. She died in 1980 at Greenock.

Parker's early paintings, as well as those of her husband, reflect the short-lived group of artists known as Vorticists, active in London in the 1920s. The main body of her work consists of wood-engravings for book illustrations that demonstrate fine draughtsmanship and skilful use of black and white design. She illustrated The Fables of Aesop (1931), Through the Woods by H. E. Bates (1936), The Open Air by Richard Jefferies (edited by Samuel J. Looker, 1949) and her most acclaimed work, Elegy Written in a Country Churchyard by Thomas Gray (1938), titles for the Limited Editions Club of New York and editions of the works of Shakespeare and Thomas Hardy.

== Books illustrated ==
- Rhoda Power – How It Happened: Myths & Folk Tales (CUP, 1930)
- Aesop – The Fables of Esope (Gregynog Press, 1933)
- Rhys Davies et al. – Daisy Matthews and Three Other Tales (GCP, 1932)
- John Sampson – XXI Welsh Gypsy Tales (Gregynog Press, 1933)
- H. E. Bates – The House with The Apricot (GCP, 1933)
- Adrien Le Corbeau – The Forest Giant (Cape, 1935)
- H. E. Bates – Through The Woods (Gollancz, 1936)
- H. E. Bates – Down The River (Gollancz, 1937)
- Thomas Gray – Elegy Written In A Country Churchyard (NY: Limited Editions Club, 1940)
- A.E. Housman – A Shropshire Lad (Harrap, 1940)
- William Shakespeare – Richard II (NY: Limited Editions Club, 1940)
- Thomas Hardy – The Return Of The Native (NY: Limited Editions Club, 1942)
- Herbert Furst – Essays In Russet (Muller, 1944)
- Richard Jefferies – Spring Of The Year (Lutterworth, 1946)
- Richard Jefferies – Life Of The Fields (Lutterworth, 1947)
- Richard Jefferies – The Old House At Coate (Lutterworth, 1948)
- Richard Jefferies – Field and Hedgerow (Lutterworth, 1948)
- Andrew McCormick – The Gold Torque: A Story of Galloway in Early Christian Times (Glasgow: McLellan, 1951)
- Aloysius Roche – Animals Under The Rainbow (Welwyn: Broad Water press, 1952)
- Edmund Spenser – The Faerie Queen (NY: Limited Editions Club, 1953)
- Eiluned Lewis – Honey Pots and Brandy Bottles (Country Life, 1954)
- John Cowper Powys – Lucifer (MacDonald, 1956)
- Thomas Hardy – Tess of the d'Urbervilles (NY: Limited Editions Club, 1956)
- Thomas Hardy – Far From The Madding Crowd (NY: Limited Editions Club, 1958)
- William Shakespeare – The Tragedies (NY: Limited Editions Club, 1959)
- Thomas Hardy – The Mayor of Casterbridge (NY: Limited Editions Club, 1967)
- William Shakespeare – Poems (NY: Limited Editions Club, 1967)
- Thomas Hardy – Jude The Obscure (NY: Limited Editions Club, 1969)
