= The Forest Giant =

The Forest Giant (French: Le Gigantesque) is a novel written by Adrien Le Corbeau, one of the pseudonyms of Romanian-born author Rudolf Bernhardt (1886–1932). An English translation was made in 1923 by T. E. Lawrence (as J. H. Ross), but both French and English versions have since fallen into obscurity.

The book was despised by Lawrence, who wrote the following while working on the translation:

At last this foul work: complete. Please have [it] typed and send [it] down that I may get it off my suffering chest before I burst. Damn Adrien le Corbeau and his rhetoric. The book is a magnificent idea, ruined by jejune bombast. My version is better than his: but dishonest here and there: but my stomach turned. Couldn't help it.

A second English edition (1935) was illustrated with woodcuts by Agnes Miller Parker.

French historian Maurice Larès wrote that, far from being a Francophobe as he is usually depicted in France, Lawrence was really a Francophile. Larès wrote: "But we should note that a man rarely devotes much of his time and effort to the study of a language and of the literature of a people he hates, unless this is in order to work for its destruction (Adolf Eichmann's behavior may be an instance of this), which was clearly not Lawrence's case. Had Lawrence really disliked the French, would he, even for financial reasons, have translated French novels into English? The quality of his translation of Le Gigantesque (The Forest Giant) reveals not only his conscientiousness as an artist but also a knowledge of French that can scarcely have derived from unfriendly feelings".
