= Moreton, Dorset =

Village in Dorset, England

Coordinates: 50.7033°N 2.2784°W

Moreton
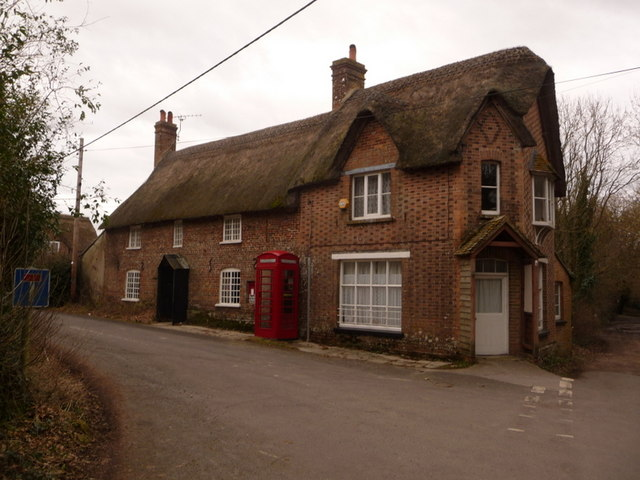
- Former post office, Moreton

- Location within Dorset
- Population: 373 (2011)
- OS grid reference: SY803893
  - London: 110 miles (180 km) NE
- Civil parish: Moreton
- Unitary authority: Dorset
- Ceremonial county: Dorset
- Region: South West
- Country: England
- Sovereign state: United Kingdom
- Post town: DORCHESTER
- Postcode district: DT2
- Dialling code: 01929
- Police: Dorset
- Fire: Dorset and Wiltshire
- Ambulance: South Western
- UK Parliament: South Dorset

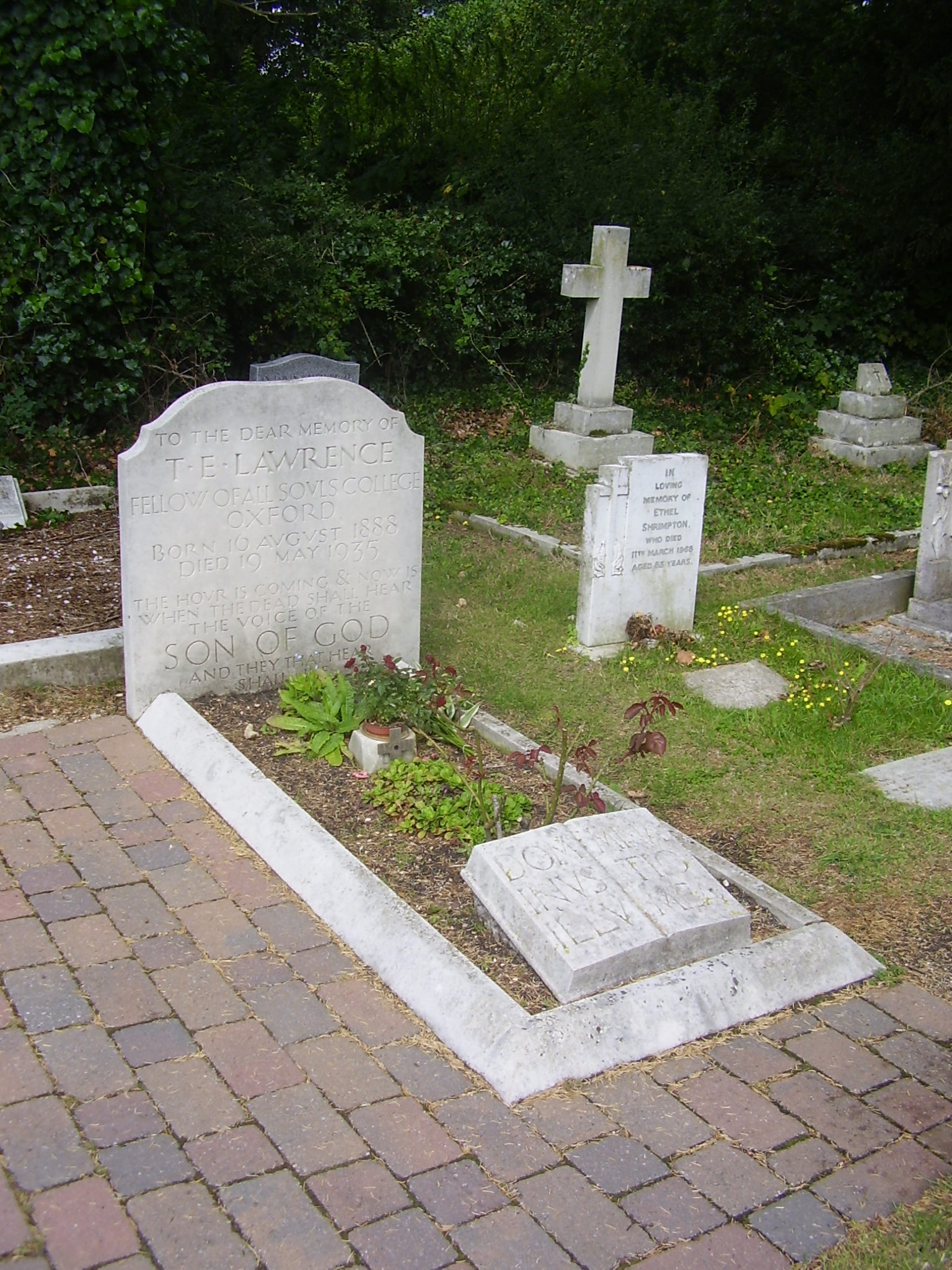
T.E. Lawrence's grave ('Lawrence of Arabia')

Moreton is a village and civil parish in Dorset, England, situated on the River Frome about 8 miles (13 km) east of Dorchester. In the 2011 census the civil parish had 158 households and a population of 373. It has a number of long distance footpaths and cycle ways passing through it: the Purbeck cycle way, Route 2 (Sustrans), the Frome valley trail, the Jubilee trail, and the Hardy Way. The railway station is a little way out of the village, towards Crossways.

The Moreton Estate hosts a number of horse riding events throughout the year, including some of national stature. A number of cycle racing events are also held, based in the village hall.

The Frampton family have been Lords of the Manor of Moreton since at least the 14th Century. The most famous member of the family was James Frampton (1769-1855) who was responsible for the prosecution of the Tolpuddle Martyrs. His sister Mary Frampton was a noted diarist.

Moreton has become synonymous with the memory of T. E. Lawrence, also known as Lawrence of Arabia. He rented nearby Clouds Hill cottage from his cousins, the Framptons, while serving at Bovington Camp. Following his death in 1935 he was buried in Moreton churchyard where his grave attracts tourists from around the world.

Moreton is also known for the windows of its church, St Nicholas, which were designed and engraved by Sir Laurence Whistler over a period of about 30 years. These replaced the dull panels of coloured glass that had been installed when the original windows were blown out by a bomb in World War II.

The River Frome race in the village is also a popular tourist attraction. A pedestrian bridge spans the shallow ford and gives access to a number of short forest walks.
