= T. E. Lawrence =

British Army officer, diplomat and writer (1888–1935)

T. E. Lawrence CB DSO
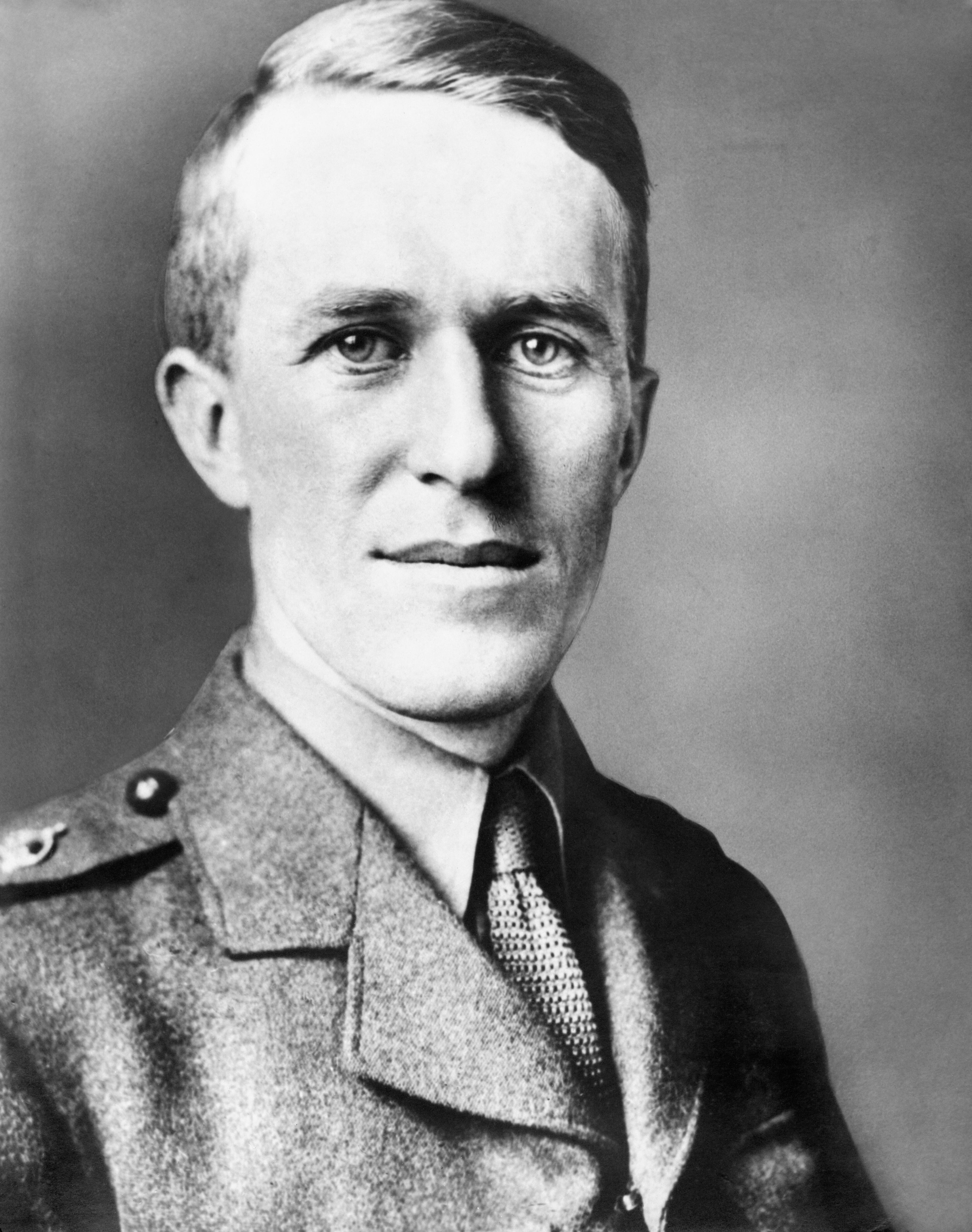
- Lawrence in 1918
- Born: Thomas Edward Lawrence; 16 August 1888; Tremadog, Carnarvonshire, Wales
- Died: 19 May 1935 (aged 46); Bovington Camp, Dorset, England
- Burial place: St Nicholas' Church, Moreton, Dorset
- Other names: T. E. Shaw, John Hume Ross
- Education: Jesus College, Oxford
- Military career
- Allegiance: United Kingdom
- Branch: British Army; Royal Air Force
- Service years: 1914–1918; 1923–1935
- Rank: Colonel (British Army); Aircraftman (RAF)
- Nickname: Lawrence of Arabia
- Conflicts: First World War; Arab Revolt; Siege of Medina; Battle of Aqaba; Capture of Damascus; Battle of Megiddo
- Awards: Companion of the Order of the Bath; Distinguished Service Order; Knight of the Legion of Honour (France); Croix de guerre (France)

Thomas Edward Lawrence (16 August 1888 – 19 May 1935) was a British Army officer, archaeologist, diplomat, and writer known for his role during the Arab Revolt and Sinai and Palestine campaign against the Ottoman Empire in the First World War. The breadth and variety of his activities and associations, and Lawrence's ability to describe them vividly in writing, earned him international fame as Lawrence of Arabia, a title used for the 1962 film based on his wartime activities.

Lawrence was born in Tremadog, Carnarvonshire, Wales, the illegitimate son of Sir Thomas Chapman, an Anglo-Irish landowner, and Sarah Lawrence (née Junner), a governess in the employ of Chapman. In 1896, Lawrence moved to Oxford, attending the City of Oxford High School for Boys, and read history at Jesus College, Oxford, from 1907 to 1910. Between 1910 and 1914, he worked as an archaeologist for the British Museum, chiefly at Carchemish in Ottoman Syria.

After the outbreak of war in 1914, Lawrence joined the British Army and was stationed at the Arab Bureau, a military intelligence unit in Egypt. In 1916, he travelled to Mesopotamia and Arabia on intelligence missions and became involved with the Arab revolt against Ottoman rule. Lawrence was ultimately assigned to the British Military Mission in the Hejaz as a liaison to Emir Faisal, a leader of the revolt. He participated in engagements with the Ottoman military culminating in the capture of Damascus in October 1918.

After the war's end, he joined the Foreign Office, working with Faisal. In 1922, Lawrence retreated from public life and served as an enlisted man in the Army and Royal Air Force (RAF) until 1935. He published Seven Pillars of Wisdom in 1926, an autobiographical account of his participation in the Arab Revolt. Lawrence also translated books into English and wrote The Mint, which detailed his service in the RAF. He corresponded extensively with prominent artists, writers, and politicians, and also participated in the development of rescue motorboats for the RAF. Lawrence's public image resulted in part from the sensationalised reporting of the Arab Revolt by American journalist Lowell Thomas, as well as from Seven Pillars of Wisdom. In 1935, Lawrence died at the age of 46 after being injured in a motorcycle crash in Dorset.

== Early life ==
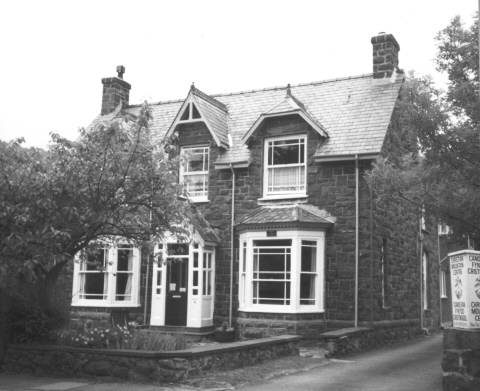
Lawrence's birthplace, Gorphwysfa, in Tremadog, Carnarvonshire

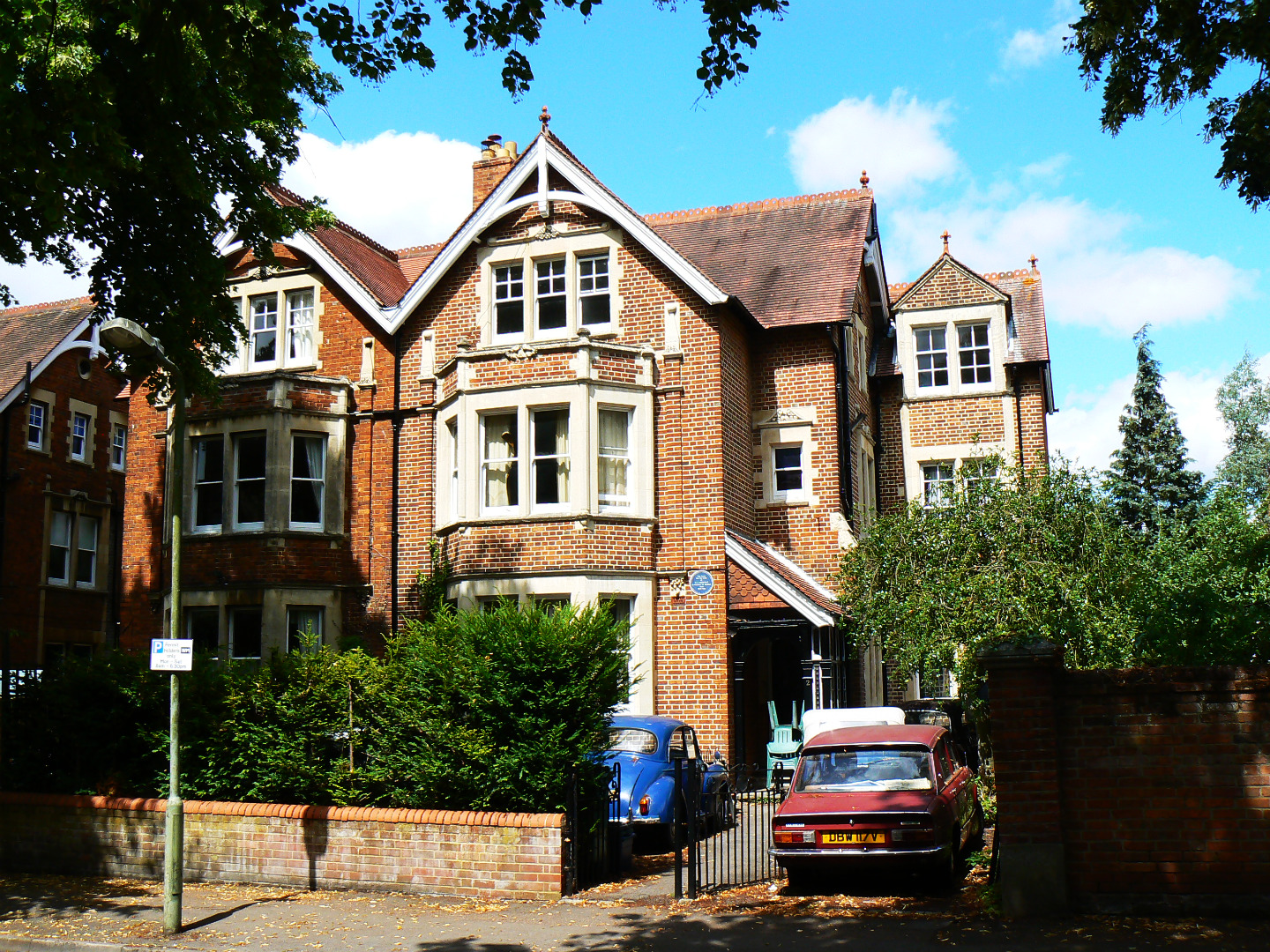
The Lawrence family lived at 2 Polstead Road, Oxford from 1896 to 1921.

Thomas Edward Lawrence was born on 16 August 1888 in Tremadog, Carnarvonshire, in a house named Gorphwysfa, now known as Snowdon Lodge. His Anglo-Irish father Thomas Chapman had left his wife Edith, after he fathered his first son with Lawrence's mother Sarah Junner, who had been governess to Chapman's daughters. Sarah was herself an illegitimate child, born in Sunderland to Elizabeth Junner, a servant employed by a family named Lawrence. She was dismissed four months before Sarah was born, and identified Sarah's father as "John Junner, Shipwright journeyman".

Lawrence's parents did not marry, but lived together under the pseudonym Lawrence. In 1914, his father inherited the Chapman baronetcy based at Killua Castle, the ancestral family home in County Westmeath, Ireland. The couple had five sons, Thomas, called "Ned" by his immediate family, being the second eldest. In 1889, the family moved from Wales to Kirkcudbright, Galloway, in southwestern Scotland, then to the Isle of Wight, then to the New Forest, then to Dinard in Brittany, and then to Jersey.

From 1894 to 1896, the family lived at Langley Lodge, set in private woods between the eastern borders of the New Forest and Southampton Water in Hampshire. At Langley Lodge (now demolished) young Lawrence had opportunities for outdoor activities and waterfront visits.

In the summer of 1896, the family moved to 2 Polstead Road in Oxford, where they lived until 1921. The wooden shed built in the garden for Lawrence to study when a schoolboy is still standing. From 1896 until 1907, Lawrence attended the City of Oxford High School for Boys, where one of the four houses was later named "Lawrence" in his honour. The school closed in 1966. Lawrence and one of his brothers became commissioned officers in the Church Lads' Brigade at St Aldate's Church.

Lawrence claimed that he ran away from home around 1905 and served for a few weeks as a boy soldier with the Royal Garrison Artillery at St Mawes Castle in Cornwall, from which he was bought out. However, no evidence of this appears in army records.

== Travels, antiquities, and archaeology ==
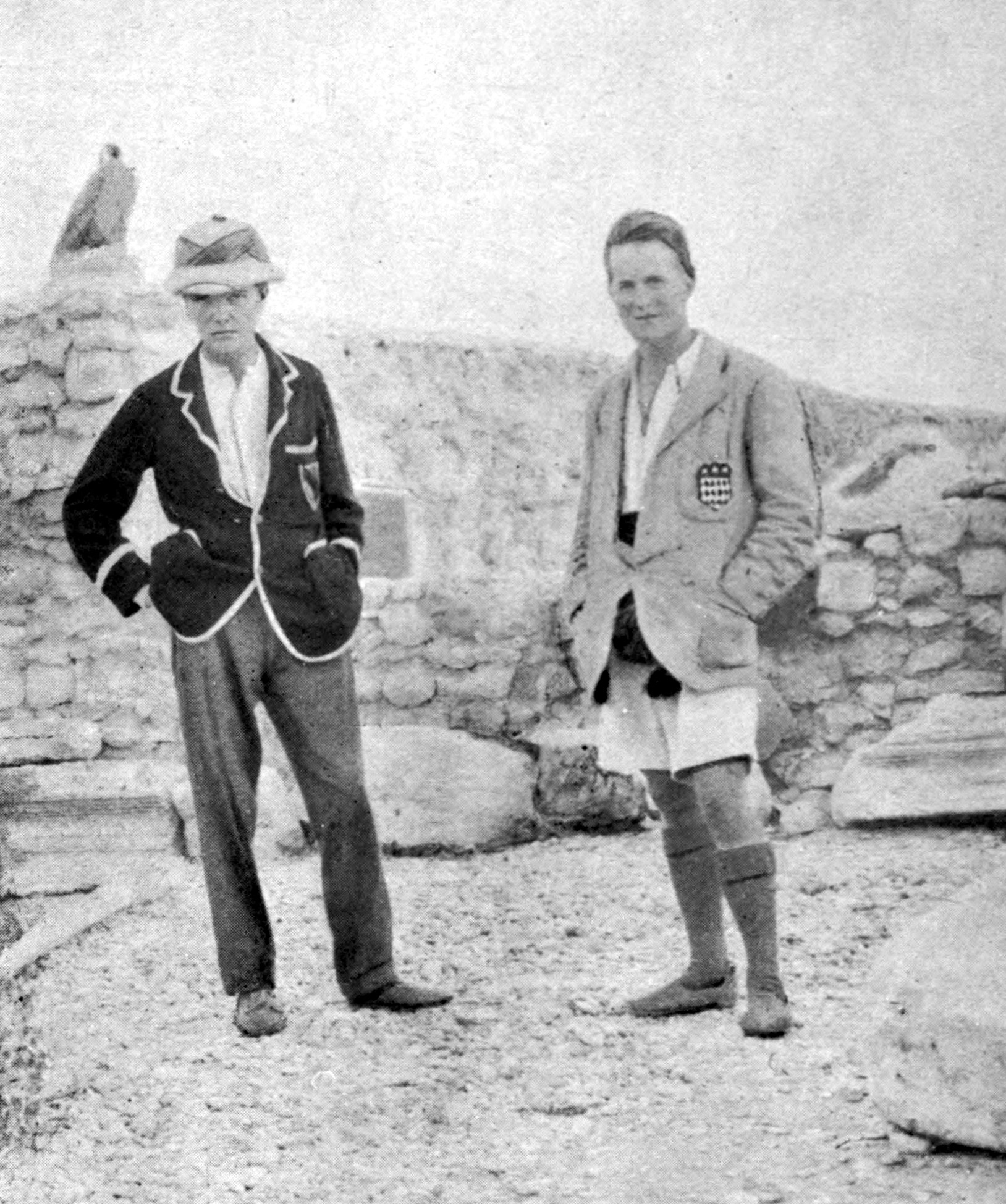
Leonard Woolley (left) and Lawrence at the excavation of Carchemish, c. 1912

At the age of 15, Lawrence cycled with his schoolfriend Cyril Beeson around Berkshire, Buckinghamshire and Oxfordshire, visiting almost every village's parish church, studying their monuments and antiquities, and making rubbings of their monumental brasses. Lawrence and Beeson monitored building sites in Oxford and presented the Ashmolean Museum with anything that they found. The Ashmolean's Annual Report for 1906 said that the two teenage boys "by incessant watchfulness secured everything of antiquarian value which has been found." In the summers of 1906 and 1907, Lawrence toured France by bicycle, sometimes with Beeson, collecting photographs, drawings, and measurements of medieval castles. In August 1907, Lawrence wrote home: "the Chaignons and the Lamballe people complimented me on my wonderful French: I have been asked twice since what part of France I came from".

From 1907 to 1910, Lawrence read history at Jesus College, Oxford. In July and August 1908, he cycled 2,200 miles (3,500 km) solo through France to the Mediterranean and back, researching French castles. In the summer of 1909, he set out alone on a three-month walking tour of crusader castles in Ottoman Syria, during which he travelled 1,000 miles (1,600 km) on foot. While at Jesus College he was a keen member of the University Officers' Training Corps (OTC).

He graduated with First Class Honours after submitting a thesis titled The Influence of the Crusades on European Military Architecture—to the End of the 12th Century, partly based on his field research with Beeson in France, and his solo research in France and the Middle East. Lawrence was fascinated by the Middle Ages. His brother Arnold wrote in 1937 that "medieval researches" were a "dream way of escape from bourgeois England".

In 1910, Lawrence was offered the opportunity to become a practising archaeologist at Carchemish, in the expedition that D. G. Hogarth was setting up on behalf of the British Museum. Hogarth arranged a "Senior Demyship", a form of scholarship, for Lawrence at Magdalen College, Oxford, to fund his work at £100 a year. In December 1910, he sailed for Beirut, and went to Byblos in Lebanon, where he studied Arabic.

He then went to work on the excavations at Carchemish, near Jerablus in northern Syria, where he worked under Hogarth, R. Campbell Thompson of the British Museum, and Leonard Woolley until 1914. He later stated that everything that he had accomplished, he owed to Hogarth. Lawrence met Gertrude Bell while excavating at Carchemish. In 1912, he worked briefly with Flinders Petrie at Kafr Ammar in Egypt.

At Carchemish, Lawrence was involved in a high-tension relationship with a German-led team working nearby on the Baghdad Railway at Jerablus. While there was never open combat, there was regular conflict over access to land and treatment of the local workforce. Lawrence gained experience in Middle Eastern leadership practices and conflict resolution.

In January 1914, Woolley and Lawrence were co-opted by the British military as an archaeological smokescreen for a British military survey of the Negev desert. They were funded by the Palestine Exploration Fund to search for an area referred to in the Bible as the Wilderness of Zin, and they made an archaeological survey of the Negev desert along the way. The Negev was strategically important because an Ottoman army attacking Egypt would have to cross it. Woolley and Lawrence published a report of the expedition's archaeological findings, but a more important result was their updated mapping of the area, with special attention to features of military relevance such as water sources. Lawrence also visited Aqaba and Shobek, not far from Petra.

== Military intelligence ==
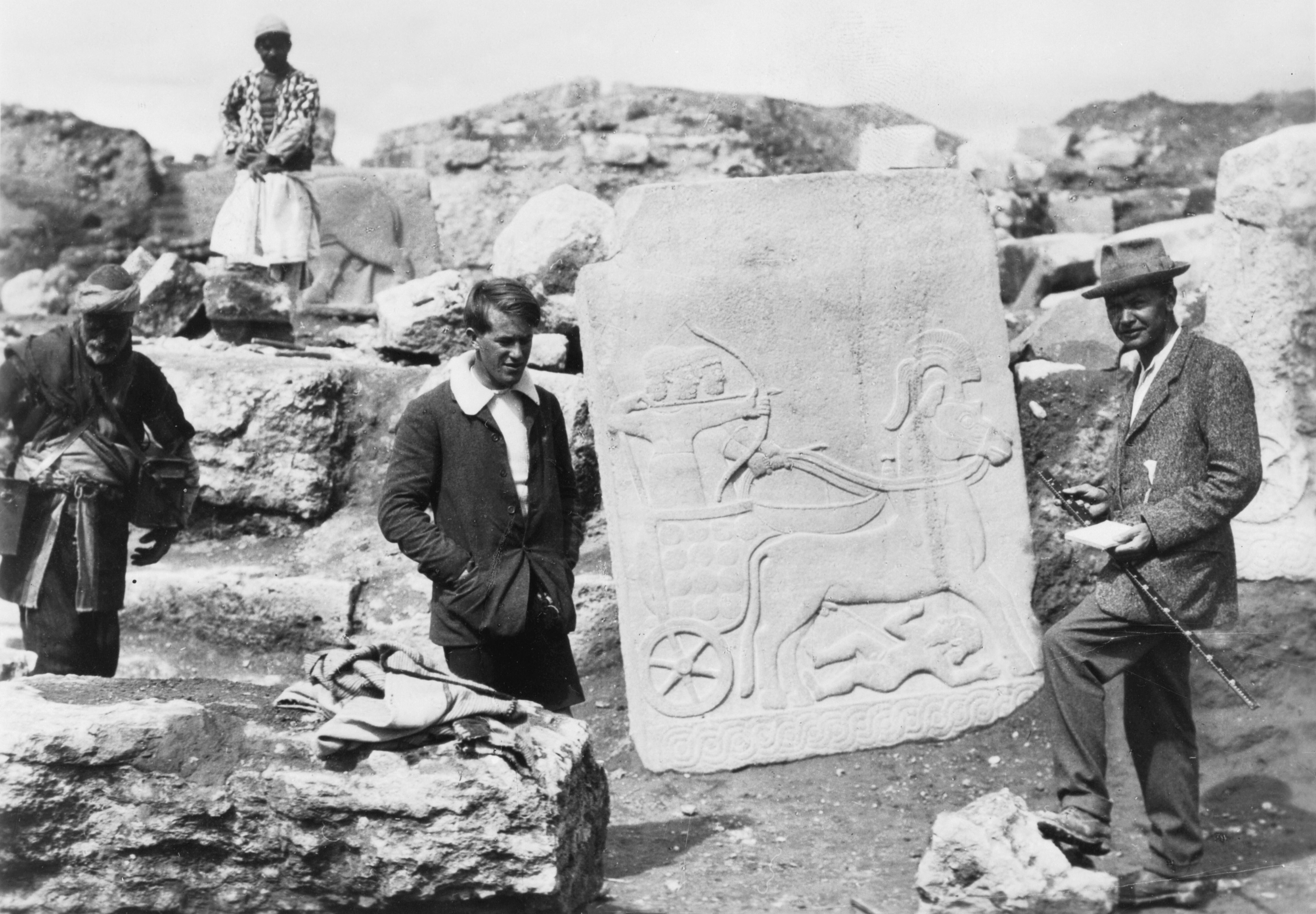
An early Hittite carving found by Lawrence (centre) and Leonard Woolley (right) in Carchemish

Following the outbreak of hostilities in August 1914, Lawrence did not immediately enlist in the British Army. He held back until October on the advice of S. F. Newcombe, when he was commissioned on the General List as temporary second lieutenant-interpreter. Before the end of the year, he was summoned by renowned archaeologist and historian Lieutenant Commander David Hogarth, his mentor at Carchemish, to the new Arab Bureau intelligence unit in Cairo, and he arrived in Cairo on 15 December 1914. The Bureau's chief was Brigadier-General Gilbert Clayton who reported to Egyptian High Commissioner Henry McMahon.

The situation was complex in 1915. There was a growing Arab nationalist movement within the Arabic-speaking Ottoman territories, including many Arabs serving in the Ottoman armed forces. They were in contact with Sharif Hussein, Emir of Mecca, who was negotiating with the British and offering to lead an Arab uprising against the Ottomans. In exchange, he wanted a British guarantee of an independent Arab state including the Hejaz, Syria, and Mesopotamia.

Such an uprising would have been helpful to Britain in its war against the Ottomans, lessening the threat against the Suez Canal. However, there was resistance from French diplomats who insisted that Syria's future was as a French colony, not an independent Arab state. There were also strong objections from the Government of India, which was nominally part of the British government but acted independently. Its vision was of Mesopotamia under British control serving as a granary for India; furthermore, it wanted to hold on to its Arabian outpost in Aden.

At the Arab Bureau, Lawrence supervised the preparation of maps, produced a daily bulletin for the British generals operating in the theatre, and interviewed prisoners. He was an advocate of a British landing at Alexandretta, now İskenderun in Turkey, that never came to pass. He was also a consistent advocate of an independent Arab Syria.

The situation came to a crisis in October 1915, as Sharif Hussein demanded an immediate commitment from Britain, with the threat that he would otherwise throw his weight behind the Ottomans. This would create a credible Pan-Islamic message that could have been dangerous for Britain, which was in severe difficulties in the Gallipoli Campaign. The British replied with a letter from High Commissioner McMahon that was generally agreeable while reserving commitments concerning the Mediterranean coastline and Holy Land.

In the spring of 1916, Lawrence was dispatched to Mesopotamia to assist in relieving the Siege of Kut by both starting an Arab uprising and bribing Ottoman officials. This mission produced no useful result. Unknown to British officials in Cairo, the Sykes–Picot Agreement, which awarded much of Syria to France, was being negotiated in London. It implied that the Arabs would have to conquer Syria's four great cities if they were to have any sort of state there: Damascus, Homs, Hama, and Aleppo. It is unclear at what point Lawrence became aware of the treaty's contents.

== Arab Revolt ==
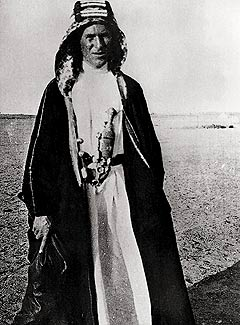
Lawrence at Rabigh, north of Jeddah, 1917

The Arab Revolt began in June 1916, but it stalled after a few successes, with a real risk that the Ottoman forces would advance along the coast of the Red Sea and recapture Mecca. On 16 October 1916, Lawrence was sent to the Hejaz on an intelligence-gathering mission led by Ronald Storrs. He interviewed Sharif Hussein's sons Ali, Abdullah, and Faisal, and concluded that Faisal was the best candidate to lead the Revolt.

In November, S. F. Newcombe was assigned to lead a permanent British liaison to Faisal's staff. Newcombe had not yet arrived in the area and the matter was of some urgency, so Lawrence was sent in his place. In late December 1916, Faisal and Lawrence worked out a plan for repositioning the Arab forces to put the railway from Syria under threat while preventing the Ottoman forces around Medina from threatening Arab positions. Newcombe arrived while Lawrence was preparing to leave Arabia, but Faisal intervened urgently, asking that Lawrence's assignment become permanent.

Lawrence's most important contributions to the Arab Revolt were in the area of strategy and liaison with British Armed Forces, but he also participated personally in several military engagements between January 1917 and September 1918. These included attacks on Ottoman communications: the railways at Aba el Naam, and Mudawara; and the destruction of a railway engine; the bridges at Ras Baalbek; and at Yarmuk, during which attack he suffered several wounds in the explosion and subsequent combat; and that at Aqaba, and the bridge which connected Amman and Dera'a. There were also assaults on Ottoman garrisons: in the Hejaz; at Tell Shahm using British armoured cars; and on retreating Ottomans and Germans near the village of Tafas, where the Ottoman forces massacred the villagers and the Arabs retaliated by killing their prisoners, with Lawrence's encouragement. In June 1917 Lawrence made a 300-mile (480 km) journey north towards Aqaba, visiting Ras Baalbek, the outskirts of Damascus, and Azraq, Jordan. He met with Arab nationalists, counselling them to avoid revolt until the arrival of Faisal's forces, and he attacked a bridge to create the impression of guerrilla activity. His findings were regarded by the British as extremely valuable and there was serious consideration of awarding him a Victoria Cross; in the end, he was invested as a Companion of the Order of the Bath and promoted to major.

He also saw action in larger-scale engagements: the defeat of the Ottoman forces at Aba el Lissan as part of the Battle of Aqaba; and in January 1918, the Battle of Tafilah, in a region southeast of the Dead Sea, where Arab regulars were engaged under the command of Jafar Pasha al-Askari. Tafilah began as a defensive engagement that turned into an offensive rout, and was described in the official history of the war as a "brilliant feat of arms". Lawrence was awarded the Distinguished Service Order for his leadership and was promoted to lieutenant colonel. Lawrence continued to travel regularly between British headquarters and Faisal, co-ordinating military action but by early 1918 he had been replaced as Faisal's chief British liaison by Lieutenant Colonel Pierce Charles Joyce, and his efforts were devoted chiefly to raiding and intelligence-gathering.

=== Strategy ===
The chief elements of the Arab strategy that Faisal and Lawrence developed were to avoid capturing Medina, and to extend northward through Maan and Dera'a to Damascus and beyond. Faisal wanted to lead regular attacks against the Ottomans, but Lawrence persuaded him to drop that tactic. Lawrence wrote about the Bedouin as a fighting force:

The value of the tribes is defensive only and their real sphere is guerilla warfare. They are intelligent, and very lively, almost reckless, but too individualistic to endure commands, or fight in line, or to help each other. It would, I think, be impossible to make an organized force out of them.… The Hejaz war is one of dervishes against regular forces—and we are on the side of the dervishes. Our text-books do not apply to its conditions at all.

Medina was an attractive target for the revolt as Islam's second-holiest site, and because its Ottoman garrison was weakened by disease and isolation. It became clear that it was advantageous to leave it there rather than try to capture it, while attacking the Hejaz railway south from Damascus without permanently destroying it. This prevented the Ottomans from making effective use of their troops at Medina, and forced them to dedicate many resources to defending and repairing the railway line.

It is not known when Lawrence learned the details of the Sykes–Picot Agreement, nor if or when he briefed Faisal on what he knew, however, there is good reason to think that both these things happened, and earlier rather than later. In particular, the Arab strategy of northward extension makes perfect sense given the Sykes–Picot language that spoke of an independent Arab entity in Syria, which would be granted only if the Arabs liberated the territory themselves. The French and some of their British Liaison officers were specifically uncomfortable about the northward movement, as it would weaken French colonial claims.

=== Capture of Aqaba ===
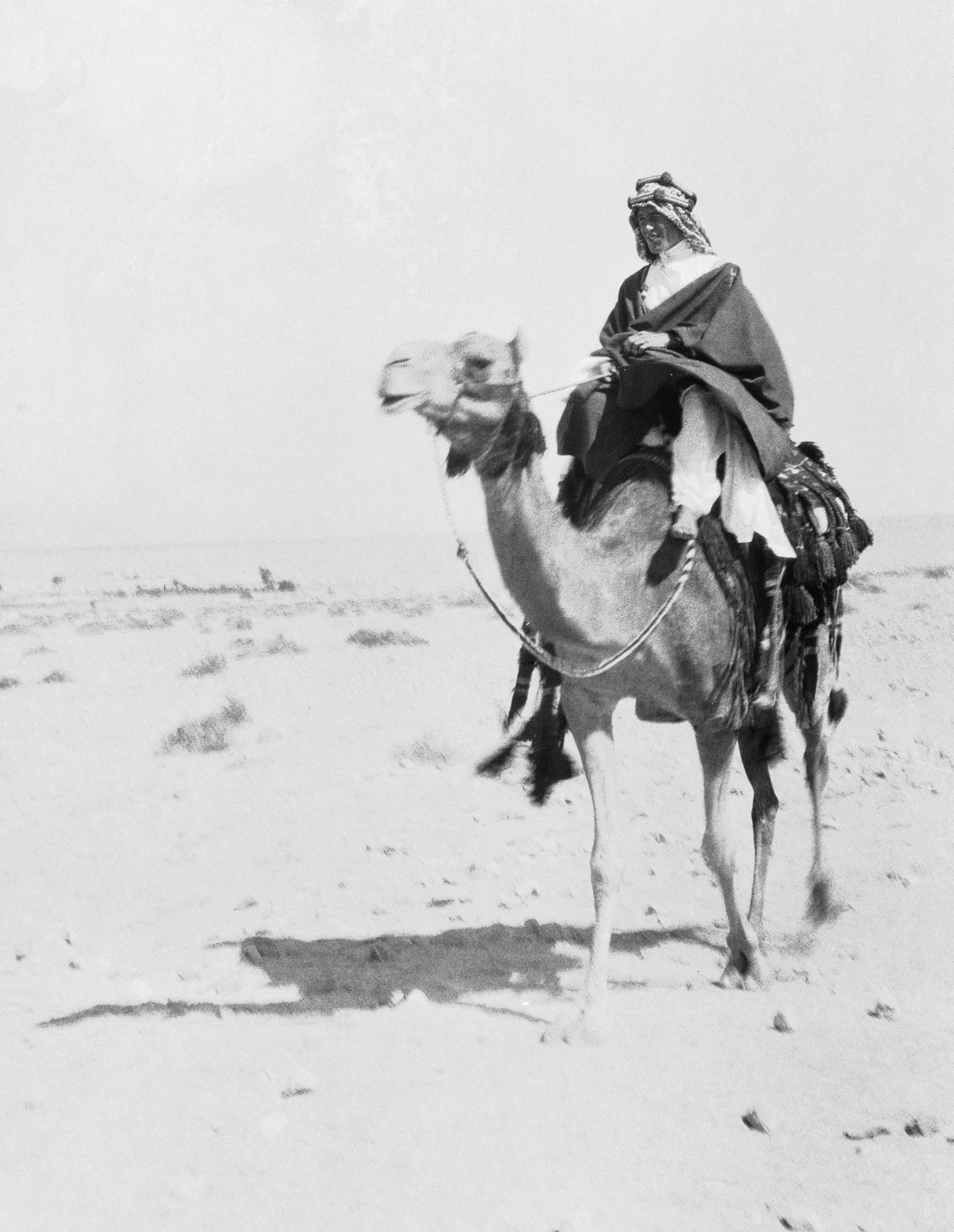
Lawrence at Aqaba, 1917

In 1917, Lawrence proposed a joint action with the Arab irregulars and forces including Auda Abu Tayi, who had previously been in the employ of the Ottomans, against the strategically located but lightly defended town of Aqaba on the Red Sea. Aqaba could have been attacked from the sea but, assuming it were captured, the narrow defiles leading inland through the mountains were strongly defended and would have been very difficult to assault. The expedition was led by Sharif Nasir of Medina.

Lawrence avoided informing his British superiors about the details of the planned inland attack, due to concern that it would be blocked as contrary to French interests. The expedition departed from Wejh on 9 May, and Aqaba fell to the Arab forces on 6 July, after a surprise overland attack that took the Turkish defences from behind. After Aqaba, General Sir Edmund Allenby, the new commander-in-chief of the Egyptian Expeditionary Force, agreed to Lawrence's strategy for the revolt. Lawrence now held a powerful position as an adviser to Faisal and a person who had Allenby's confidence, as Allenby acknowledged after the war:

I gave him a free hand. His cooperation was marked by the utmost loyalty, and I never had anything but praise for his work, which, indeed, was invaluable throughout the campaign. He was the mainspring of the Arab movement and knew their language, their manners and their mentality.

=== Dera'a ===
Lawrence describes an episode on 20 November 1917 while reconnoitring Dera'a in disguise, when he was captured by the Ottoman military, beaten, and sexually assaulted by the local bey and his guardsmen, though he does not specify the nature of the sexual contact. Some scholars have stated that he exaggerated the severity of the injuries that he suffered, or alleged that the episode never happened. There is no independent testimony, but the multiple consistent reports and the absence of evidence for outright invention in Lawrence's works make the account believable to some of his biographers. Malcolm Brown, John E. Mack, and Jeremy Wilson have argued that this episode had strong psychological effects on Lawrence, which may explain some of his unconventional behaviour in later life. Lawrence ended his account of the episode in Seven Pillars of Wisdom with the statement: "In Dera'a that night the citadel of my integrity had been irrevocably lost."

The son of the Governor resident in Dera'a at the time has been quoted as saying the narrative must be false, because Lawrence describes the Bey's hair, while in fact his father was bald. In fact, Lawrence describes (in the 1922 text) the Bey's head as shaven, with stubble standing up. There is also uncertainty about the identity of the individual that Lawrence refers to as "the Bey".

=== Fall of Damascus ===
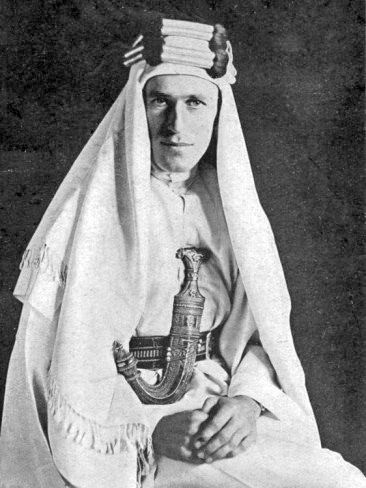
Lawrence in 1919

Lawrence was involved in the build-up to the capture of Damascus in the final weeks of the war, but he was not present at the city's formal surrender. He arrived several hours after the city had fallen, entering Damascus around 9 am on 1 October 1918; the first to arrive was the 10th Light Horse Regiment led by Major A. C. N. "Harry" Olden, who accepted the formal surrender of the city from acting Governor Emir Said. Lawrence was instrumental in establishing a provisional Arab government under Faisal in newly liberated Damascus, which he had envisioned as the capital of an Arab state. Faisal's rule as king, however, came to an abrupt end in 1920, after the battle of Maysaloun when the French Forces of General Henri Gouraud entered Damascus under the command of General Mariano Goybet, destroying Lawrence's dream of an independent Arabia.

During the closing years of the war, Lawrence sought to convince his superiors in the British government that Arab independence was in their interests, but his success was mixed. The secret Sykes–Picot Agreement between France and Britain contradicted the promises of independence that he had made to the Arabs and frustrated his work.

== Post-war years ==
Lawrence returned to the United Kingdom as a full colonel. Immediately after the war, he worked for the Foreign Office, attending the Paris Peace Conference between January and May as a member of Faisal's delegation. On 17 May 1919, a Handley Page Type O/400 taking Lawrence to Egypt crashed at the airport of Roma-Centocelle. The pilot and co-pilot were killed; Lawrence survived with a broken shoulder blade and two broken ribs. During his brief hospitalisation, he was visited by King Victor Emmanuel III of Italy.

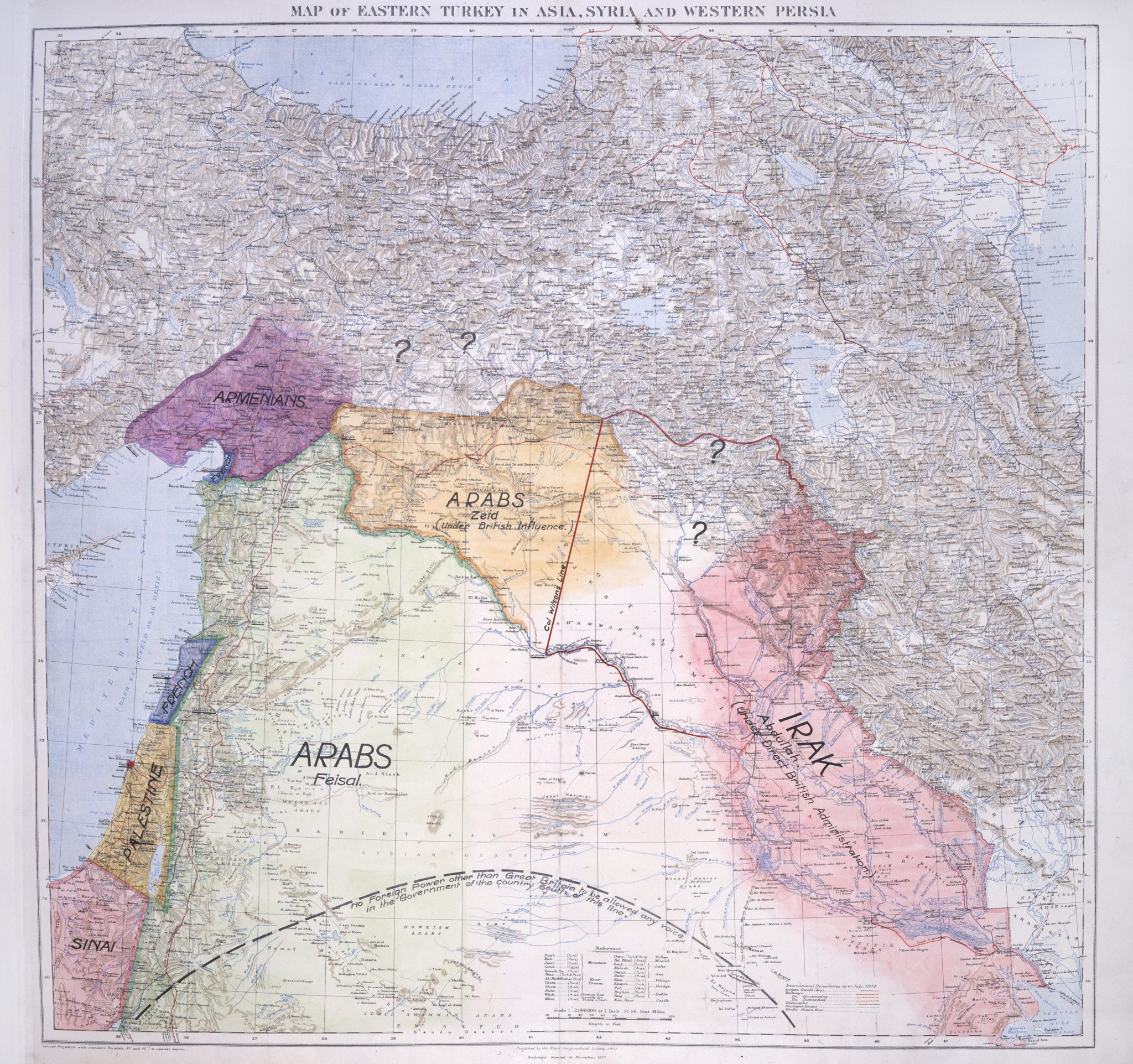
A map presented by Lawrence to the Eastern Committee of the War Cabinet in November 1918.

In 1918, Lowell Thomas went to Jerusalem where he met Lawrence, "whose enigmatic figure in Arab uniform fired his imagination", in the words of author Rex Hall. Thomas and his cameraman Harry Chase shot a great deal of film and many photographs involving Lawrence. Thomas produced a stage presentation entitled With Allenby in Palestine which included a lecture, dancing, and music and depicted the Middle East as exotic, mysterious, sensuous, and violent. The show premiered in New York in March 1919. He was invited to take his show to England, and he agreed to do so provided that he was personally invited by the King and provided the use of either Drury Lane or Covent Garden. He opened at Covent Garden on 14 August 1919 and continued for hundreds of lectures, "attended by the highest in the land".

Initially, Lawrence played only a supporting role in the show, as the main focus was on Allenby's campaigns; but then Thomas realised that it was the photos of Lawrence dressed as a Bedouin which had captured the public's imagination, so he had Lawrence photographed again in London in Arab dress. With the new photos, Thomas re-launched his show under the new title With Allenby in Palestine and Lawrence in Arabia in early 1920, which proved to be extremely popular. The new title elevated Lawrence from a supporting role to a co-star of the Near Eastern campaign and reflected a changed emphasis. Thomas' shows made the previously obscure Lawrence into a household name. Lawrence worked with Thomas on the creation of the presentation, answering many questions and posing for many photographs. After its success, however, he expressed regret about having been featured in it.

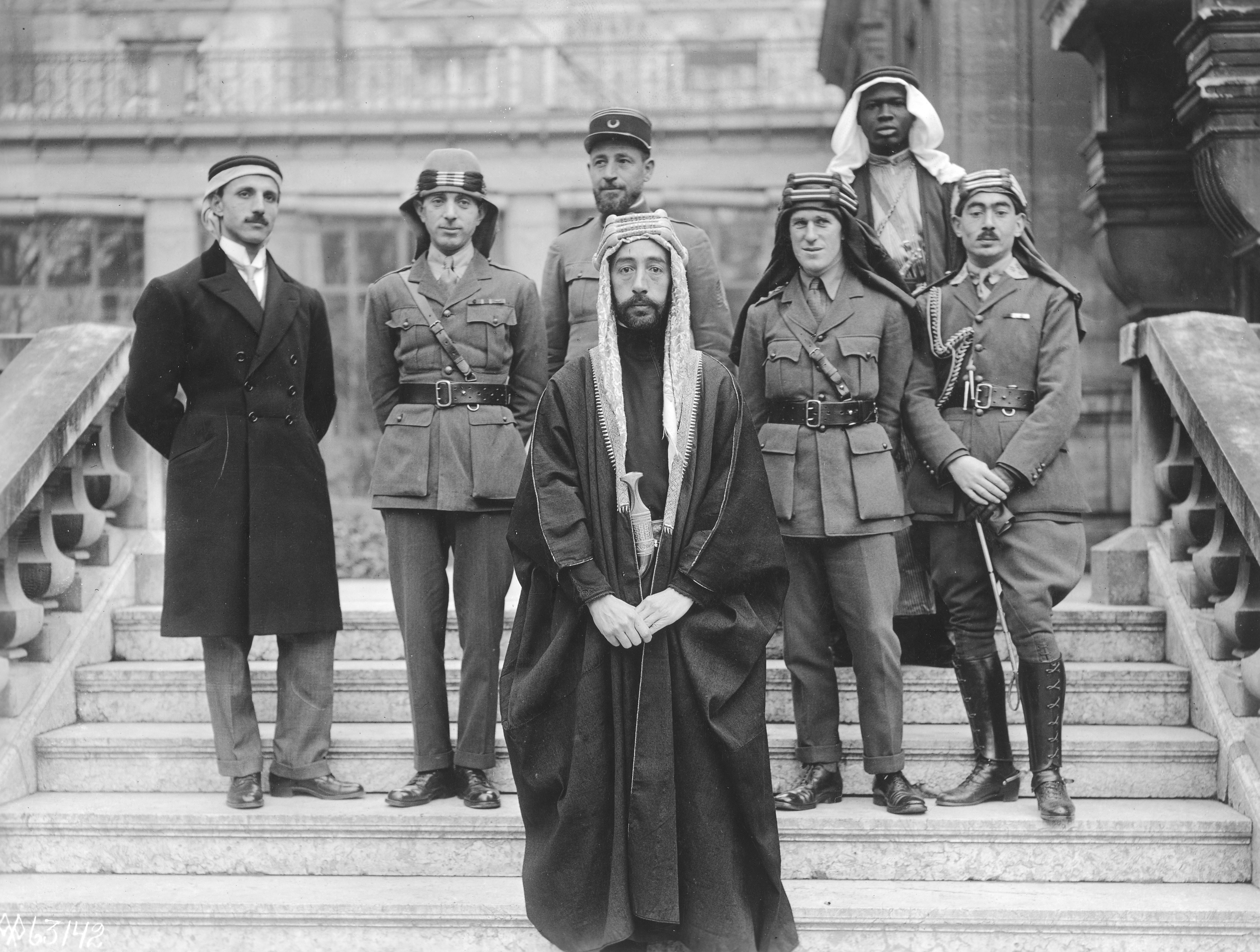
Emir Faisal's party at Versailles, during the Paris Peace Conference of 1919; left to right: Rustum Haidar, Nuri al-Said, Prince Faisal (front), Captain Pisani (rear), Lawrence, Faisal's servant (name unknown), Captain Hassan Khadri

Lawerence was demobilised from the army on 31 July 1919; his final rank was lieutenant colonel. Starting in February 1920, he worked as an adviser to Winston Churchill at the Colonial Office, serving in that role for just over a year. He hated bureaucratic work, writing on 21 May 1921 to Robert Graves: "I wish I hadn't gone out there: the Arabs are like a page I have turned over; and sequels are rotten things. I'm locked up here: office every day and much of it". He travelled to the Middle East on multiple occasions during this period, at one time holding the title of "chief political officer for Trans-Jordania". He campaigned for his and Churchill's vision of the Middle East, publishing pieces in multiple newspapers, including The Times, The Observer, The Daily Mail, and The Daily Express.

Lawrence had a sinister reputation in France during his lifetime and even today as an implacable "enemy of France", the man who was constantly stirring up the Syrians to rebel against French rule throughout the 1920s. However, French historian Maurice Larès wrote that the real reason for France's problems in Syria was that the Syrians did not want to be ruled by France, and the French needed a scapegoat to blame for their difficulties in ruling the country. Larès wrote that Lawrence is usually pictured in France as a Francophobe, but he was really a Francophile.

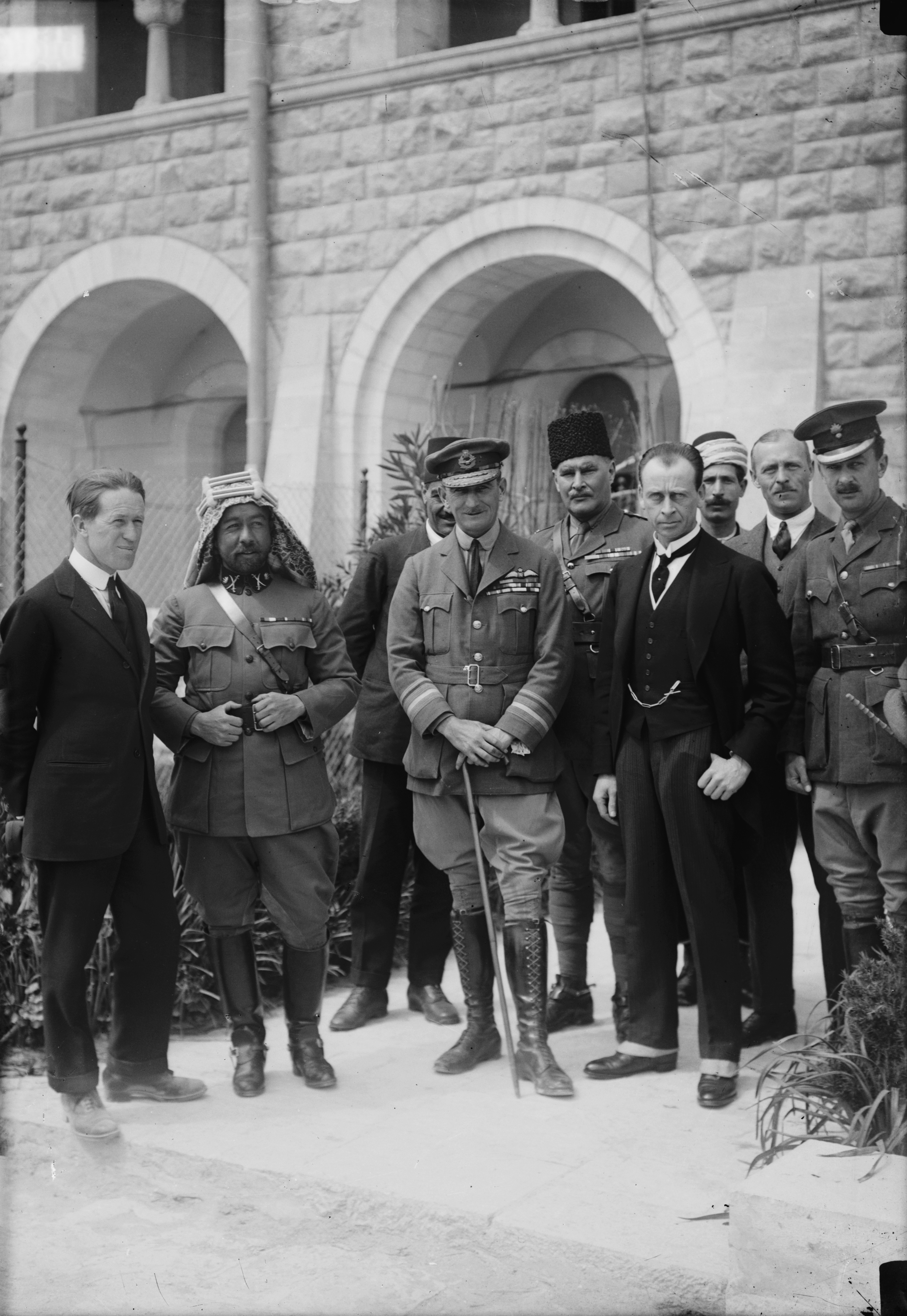
Lawrence, Emir Abdullah, Air Marshal Sir Geoffrey Salmond, Sir Wyndham Deedes, and others in Jerusalem

Having seen and admired the effective use of air power during the war, in August 1922 Lawrence enlisted in the Royal Air Force as an aircraftman under the name John Hume Ross. At the RAF recruiting centre in Covent Garden, London, he was interviewed by recruiting officer Flying Officer W. E. Johns, later known as the author of the Biggles series of novels. Johns rejected Lawrence's application, as he suspected that "Ross" was a false name. Lawrence admitted that this was so and that he had provided false documents. He left, but returned some time later with an RAF messenger who carried a written order that Johns must accept Lawrence.

However, Lawrence was forced out of the RAF in February 1923 after his identity was exposed. He changed his name to T. E. Shaw (apparently as a consequence of his friendship with George Bernard Shaw and Charlotte Shaw) and joined the Royal Tank Corps later that year. He was unhappy there and repeatedly petitioned to rejoin the RAF, which finally readmitted him in August 1925. A fresh burst of publicity after the publication of Revolt in the Desert resulted in his assignment to bases at Karachi and Miramshah in British India (now Pakistan) in late 1926, where he remained until the end of 1928. At that time, he was forced to return to Britain after rumours began to circulate that he was involved in espionage activities.

He purchased several small plots of land in Chingford, built a hut and swimming pool there, and visited frequently. The hut was removed in 1930 when Chingford Urban District Council acquired the land; it was given to the City of London Corporation which re-erected it in the grounds of The Warren, Loughton. Lawrence's tenure of the Chingford land has now been commemorated by a plaque fixed on the Royal Observatory, Greenwich sighting obelisk on Pole Hill.

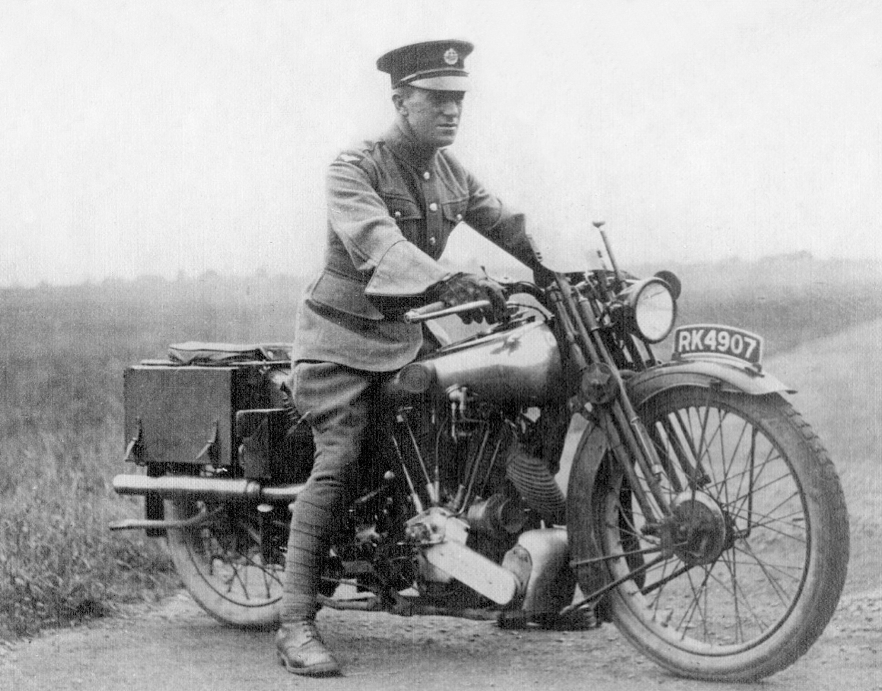
Lawrence on the Brough Superior SS100 that he called "George V"

Lawrence continued serving at several RAF bases, notably at RAF Mount Batten near Plymouth, RAF Calshot near Southampton, RAF Felixstowe and RAF Bridlington in the East Riding of Yorkshire. In the inter-war period, the RAF's Marine Craft Section began to commission air-sea rescue launches capable of higher speeds and greater capacity. The arrival of high-speed craft into the MCS was driven in part by Lawrence. He had previously witnessed a seaplane crew drowning when the seaplane tender sent to their rescue was too slow in arriving. He worked with Hubert Scott-Paine, the founder of the British Power Boat Company (BPBC), to introduce the 37.5-foot (11.4 m) long ST 200 Seaplane Tender Mk1 into service. These boats had a range of 140 miles (230 km) when cruising at 24 knots and could achieve a top speed of 29 knots.

He professed happiness, and he left the service with considerable regret at the end of his enlistment in March 1935.

In a tribute to Lawrence in 1936 Churchill wrote:

He saw as clearly as anyone the vision of airpower and all that it would mean in traffic and war. ... He felt that in living the life of a private in the Royal Air Force he would dignify that honorable calling and help to attract all that is keenest in our youthful manhood to the sphere where it is most urgently needed. For this service and example, ... we owe him a separate debt. It was in itself a princely gift.

== Death ==
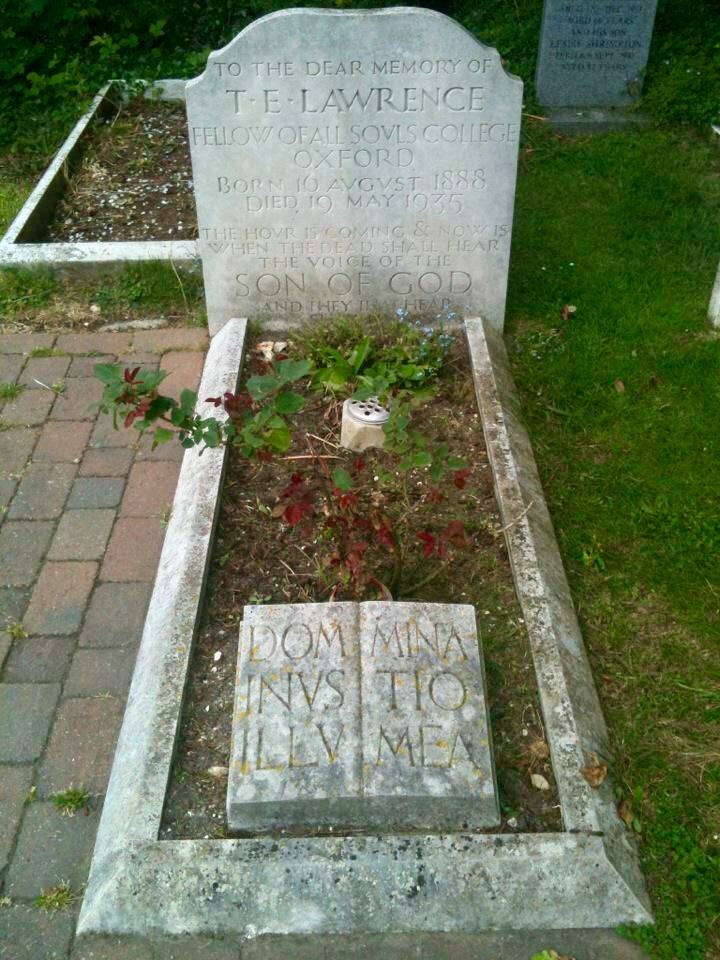
Lawrence's grave is in the separate churchyard of St Nicholas' Church, Moreton, Dorset.

Lawrence was a keen motorcyclist and owned eight Brough Superior motorcycles at different times. His last SS100 (Registration GW 2275) is privately owned but has been on loan to the National Motor Museum, Beaulieu and the Imperial War Museum in London. In 1934, he rode his motorcycle over 200 miles from Manchester to Winchester to meet Eugène Vinaver, editor of the Winchester Manuscript of Thomas Malory's Le Morte d'Arthur, a book that he admired and carried on his campaigns.

On 13 May 1935, Lawrence was fatally injured in a crash on his SS100 in Dorset close to his cottage, Clouds Hill, near Bovington Camp, just two months after leaving military service. A dip in the road obscured his view of two boys on their bicycles; he swerved to avoid them, lost control, and was thrown over the handlebars. He died six days later on 19 May 1935, aged 46. The location of the crash is marked by a small memorial at the roadside. One of the doctors attending him was neurosurgeon Hugh Cairns, who consequently began a long study of the loss of life by motorcycle dispatch riders through head injuries. His research led to the use of crash helmets by both military and civilian motorcyclists.

The Moreton estate borders Bovington Camp, and Lawrence bought Clouds Hill from his cousins, the Frampton family. He had been a frequent visitor to their home, Oakers Wood House, and had corresponded with Louisa Frampton for years. Lawrence's mother arranged with the Framptons to have his body buried in their family plot in the separate burial ground of St Nicholas' Church, Moreton. The coffin was transported on the Frampton estate's bier. Mourners included Winston Churchill, E. M. Forster, Lady Astor, and Lawrence's youngest brother, Arnold. Churchill described him thus: "Lawrence was one of those beings whose pace of life was faster and more intense than what is normal."

The inquest into Lawrence's death was conducted hurriedly and there was conflicting testimony, particularly in the report of a "black car" which may or may not have been present at the scene of the accident, and the behaviour of the bicycling boys. Some have speculated that Lawrence was assassinated but, owing to a lack of supporting evidence, it is generally accepted that his death was an accident.

== Writings ==
Lawrence was a prolific writer throughout his life. A large portion of his writing was epistolary; he often sent several letters a day, and a number of collections of his letters have been published. He corresponded with many notable figures, including George Bernard Shaw, Edward Elgar, Winston Churchill, Robert Graves, Noël Coward, E. M. Forster, Siegfried Sassoon, John Buchan, Augustus John, and Henry Williamson. He met Joseph Conrad and commented perceptively on his works. Lawrence sent many letters to Shaw's wife, Charlotte.

Lawrence was a competent speaker of French and Arabic, and reader of Latin and Ancient Greek. Lawrence published three major texts in his lifetime. The most significant was his account of the Arab Revolt in Seven Pillars of Wisdom. Homer's Odyssey and The Forest Giant were translations, the latter an otherwise forgotten work of French fiction. He received a flat fee for the second translation, and negotiated a generous fee plus royalties for the first.

=== Seven Pillars of Wisdom ===
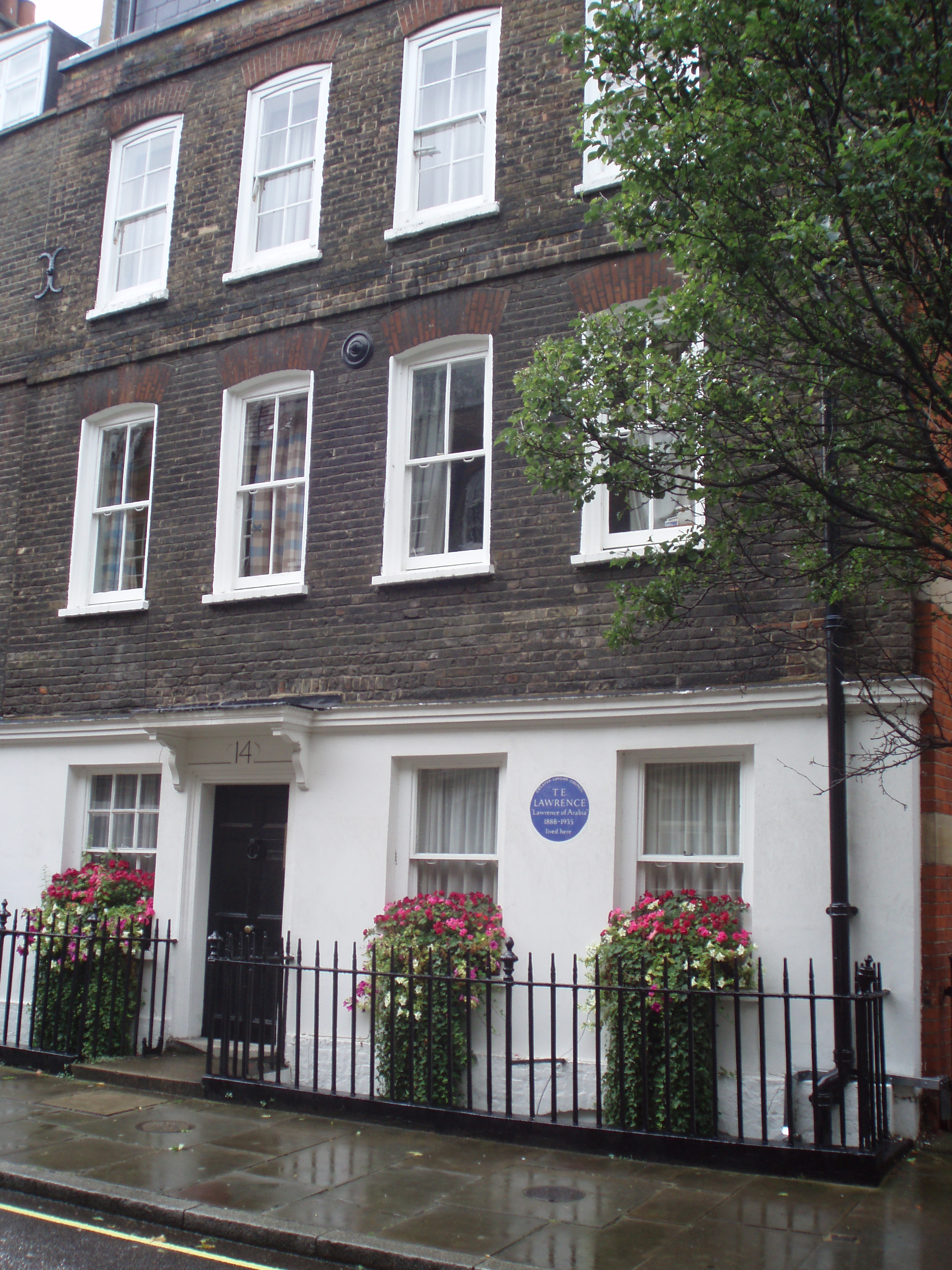
14 Barton Street, Westminster, London, where Lawrence lived while writing Seven Pillars

Lawrence's major work is Seven Pillars of Wisdom, an account of his war experiences. In 1919, he was elected to a seven-year research fellowship at All Souls College, Oxford, providing him with support while he worked on the book. Certain parts of the book also serve as essays on military strategy, Arabian culture and geography, and other topics. He rewrote Seven Pillars of Wisdom three times, once "blind" after he lost the manuscript.

There are many alleged "embellishments" in Seven Pillars, though some allegations have been disproved with time, most definitively in Jeremy Wilson's authorised biography. However, Lawrence's own notebooks refute his claim to have crossed the Sinai Peninsula from Aqaba to the Suez Canal in just 49 hours without any sleep. In reality, this famous camel ride lasted for more than 70 hours and was interrupted by two long breaks for sleeping, which Lawrence omitted when he wrote his book.

In the preface, Lawrence acknowledged George Bernard Shaw's help in editing the book. The first edition was published in 1926 as a high-priced private subscription edition, printed in London by Herbert John Hodgson and Roy Manning Pike, with illustrations by Eric Kennington, Augustus John, Paul Nash, Blair Hughes-Stanton, and Hughes-Stanton's wife Gertrude Hermes. Lawrence was afraid that the public would think that he would make a substantial income from the book, and he stated that it was written as a result of his war service. He vowed not to take any money from it, and indeed he did not, as the sale price was one third of the production costs, leaving him in substantial debt. He always took care not to give the impression that he had profited economically from the Arab revolt. In a 'deleted chapter' of the Seven Pillars which reappeared in 2022, Lawrence wrote:

For my work on the Arab front I had determined to accept nothing. The cabinet raised the Arabs to fight for us by definite promises of self-government afterwards. Arabs believe in persons, not in institutions. They saw in me a free agent of the British government, and demanded from me an endorsement of its written promises. So I had to join the conspiracy, and, for what my word was worth, assured the men of their reward. In our two years' partnership under fire they grew accustomed to believing me and to think my government, like myself, sincere. In this hope they performed some fine things but, of course, instead of being proud of what we did together, I was continually and bitterly ashamed.

As a specialist in the Middle East, Fred Halliday praised Lawrence's Seven Pillars of Wisdom as a "fine work of prose" but described its relevance to the study of Arab history and society as "almost worthless."

Stanford historian Priya Satia observes that Seven Pillars presents the Middle East with a broadly positive, yet 'Orientalist' perspective. Lawrence's romanticised and vivid depictions transformed him into a sought-after symbol of Britain's leadership and goodwill in the Middle East. This occurred during a time when Britain's global influence was waning, and the nation was grappling with the aftermath of the First World War. Therefore, his "...books evoked a vision of redemption from the troubled spirit of the age" and offered a "reassurance of continuity" with Britain's triumphant history.

=== Revolt in the Desert ===
Revolt in the Desert was an abridged version of Seven Pillars that he began in 1926 and that was published in March 1927 in both limited and trade editions. He undertook a needed but reluctant publicity exercise, which resulted in a best-seller. Again he vowed not to take any fees from the publication, partly to appease the subscribers to Seven Pillars who had paid dearly for their editions. By the fourth reprint in 1927, the debt from Seven Pillars was paid off. As Lawrence left for military service in India at the end of 1926, he set up the "Seven Pillars Trust" with his friend D. G. Hogarth as a trustee, in which he made over the copyright and any surplus income of Revolt in the Desert. He later told Hogarth that he had "made the Trust final, to save myself the temptation of reviewing it, if Revolt turned out a best seller."

The resultant trust paid off the debt, and Lawrence then invoked a clause in his publishing contract to halt publication of the abridgement in the United Kingdom. However, he allowed both American editions and translations, which resulted in a substantial flow of income. The trust paid income either into an educational fund for children of RAF officers who lost their lives or were invalided as a result of service, or more substantially into the RAF Benevolent Fund.

=== Posthumous ===
Lawrence left The Mint unpublished, a memoir of his experiences as an enlisted man in the Royal Air Force (RAF). For this, he worked from a notebook that he kept while enlisted, writing of the daily lives of enlisted men and his desire to be a part of something larger than himself. The book is stylistically different from Seven Pillars of Wisdom, using sparse prose as opposed to the complicated syntax found in Seven Pillars. It was published posthumously, edited by his brother Arnold.

After Lawrence's death, Arnold Lawrence inherited Lawrence's estate and his copyrights as the sole beneficiary. To pay the inheritance tax, he sold the US copyright of Seven Pillars of Wisdom (subscribers' text) outright to Doubleday Doran in 1935. Doubleday controlled publication rights of this version of the text of Seven Pillars of Wisdom in the US until the copyright expired at the end of 2022 (publication plus 95 years). In 1936, A. W. Lawrence split the remaining assets of the estate, giving Clouds Hill and many copies of less substantial or historical letters to the National Trust, and then set up two trusts to control interests in his brother's residual copyrights. He assigned the copyright in Seven Pillars of Wisdom to the Seven Pillars of Wisdom Trust, and it was given its first general publication as a result. He assigned the copyright in The Mint and all Lawrence's letters to the Letters and Symposium Trust, which he edited and published in the book T. E. Lawrence by his Friends in 1937. The work contained recollections and reminiscences by a large number of Lawrence's friends and colleagues.

A substantial amount of income went directly to the RAF Benevolent Fund and to archaeological, environmental, and academic projects. The two trusts were amalgamated in 1986, and the unified trust acquired all the remaining rights to Lawrence's works that it had not owned on the death of A. W. Lawrence in 1991, plus rights to all of A. W. Lawrence's works. The UK copyrights on Lawrence's works published in his lifetime and within 20 years of his death expired on 1 January 2006. Works published more than 20 years after his death were protected for 50 years from publication or to 1 January 2040, whichever is earlier.

== Sexuality ==
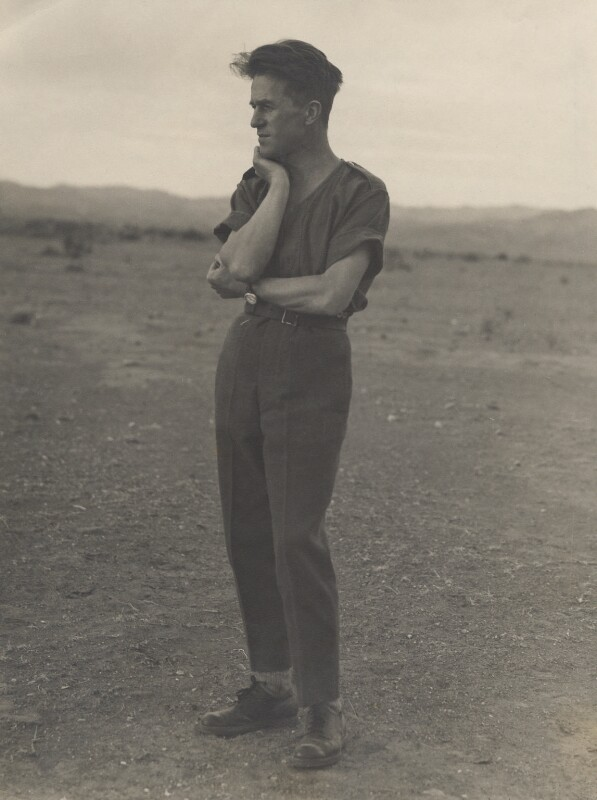
Lawrence in Miranshah 1928

Lawrence's biographers have discussed his sexuality at considerable length and this discussion has spilled into the popular press. There is no direct evidence for consensual sexual intimacy between Lawrence and any person. His friends have expressed the opinion that he was asexual, and in multiple private letters Lawrence himself specifically denied any personal experience of sex. There were suggestions that Lawrence had been intimate with his companion Selim Ahmed, "Dahoum", who worked with him at a pre-war archaeological dig in Carchemish, and fellow serviceman R. A. M. Guy, but his biographers and contemporaries found them unconvincing.

The dedication to his book Seven Pillars is a poem titled "To S.A." which opens:

I loved you, so I drew these tides of men into my hands
and wrote my will across the sky in stars
To earn you Freedom, the seven-pillared worthy house,
that your eyes might be shining for me
When we came.

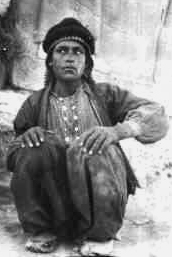
Selim "Dahoum" Ahmed

Lawrence was never specific about the identity of "S.A." Many theories argue in favour of individual men or women, and the Arab nation as a whole. The most popular theory is that S.A. represents (at least in part) Dahoum, who apparently died of typhus before 1918.

Lawrence lived in a period of strong official opposition to homosexuality, but his writing on the subject was tolerant. He wrote to Charlotte Shaw, "I've seen lots of man-and-man loves: very lovely and fortunate some of them were." He refers to "the openness and honesty of perfect love" on one occasion in Seven Pillars, when discussing relationships between young male fighters in the war. The passage in the front matter is referred to with the single-word tag "Sex".

He wrote in Chapter 1 of Seven Pillars:

In horror of such sordid commerce [diseased female prostitutes] our youths began indifferently to slake one another's few needs in their own clean bodies — a cold convenience that, by comparison, seemed sexless and even pure. Later, some began to justify this sterile process, and swore that friends quivering together in the yielding sand with intimate hot limbs in supreme embrace, found there hidden in the darkness a sensual co-efficient of the mental passion which was welding our souls and spirits in one flaming effort [to secure Arab independence]. Several, thirsting to punish appetites they could not wholly prevent, took a savage pride in degrading the body, and offered themselves fiercely in any habit which promised physical pain or filth.

There is considerable evidence that Lawrence was a masochist. He wrote in his description of the Dera'a beating that "a delicious warmth, probably sexual, was swelling through me," and he also included a detailed description of the guards' whip in a style typical of masochists' writing. In later life, Lawrence arranged to pay a military colleague to administer beatings to him, and to be subjected to severe formal tests of fitness and stamina.

John Bruce first wrote on this topic, including some other statements that were not credible, but Lawrence's biographers regard the beatings as established fact. French novelist André Malraux admired Lawrence but wrote that he had a "taste for self-humiliation, now by discipline and now by veneration; a horror of respectability; a disgust for possessions". Biographer Lawrence James wrote that the evidence suggested a "strong homosexual masochism", noting that he never sought punishment from women.

Psychiatrist John E. Mack sees a possible connection between Lawrence's masochism and the childhood beatings that he had received from his mother for routine misbehaviours. His brother Arnold thought that the beatings had been given for the purpose of breaking his brother's will. Angus Calder suggested in 1997 that Lawrence's apparent masochism and self-loathing might have stemmed from a sense of guilt over losing his brothers Frank and Will on the Western Front, along with many other school friends, while he survived.

== Aldington controversy ==
In 1955 Richard Aldington published Lawrence of Arabia: A Biographical Enquiry, a sustained attack on Lawrence's character, writing, accomplishments, and veracity. Aldington alleged that Lawrence lied and exaggerated continuously ("Seven Pillars of Wisdom is rather a work of quasi-fiction than history", "It was seldom that he reported any fact or episode involving himself without embellishing them and indeed in some cases entirely inventing them"). He further claimed that Lawrence promoted a misguided policy in the Middle East; that his strategy of containing but not capturing Medina was incorrect, and that Seven Pillars of Wisdom was a bad book with few redeeming features.

Aldington argued that the French colonial administration of Syria (resisted by Lawrence) benefited that country and that Arabia's peoples were "far enough advanced for some government though not for complete self-government." For Aldington—a Francophile—French colonialism was unassailable. He railed against Lawrence's "Francophobia, a hatred and an envy so irrational, so irresponsible and so unscrupulous that it is fair to say his attitude towards Syria was determined more by hatred of France than by devotion to the 'Arabs' – a convenient propaganda word which grouped many disharmonious and even mutually hostile tribes and peoples."

Aldington wrote that Lawrence embellished many stories and invented others, and in particular that claims involving numbers were inflated. Many of these claims appeared in the biographies by Robert Graves and Liddell Hart that were written during Lawrence's lifetime. Aldington shows that Lawrence edited those books and in fact provided some of the key texts, then asked the authors to conceal that fact. The claims included Lawrence having read 50,000 books in the Oxford Union library, blown up 79 bridges, had a price of £50,000 on his head, and suffered 60 or more injuries.

Prior to the publication of Aldington's book, its contents became known in London's literary community. A group Aldington and some subsequent authors referred to as "The Lawrence Bureau", led by B. H. Liddell Hart, tried energetically, starting in 1954, to have the book suppressed. When that effort failed, Hart prepared and distributed hundreds of copies of Aldington's 'Lawrence': His Charges – and Treatment of the Evidence, a seven-page single-spaced document. This worked: Aldington's book received many extremely negative and even abusive reviews, with strong evidence that some reviewers had read Liddell's rebuttal but not Aldington's book.

In Richard Aldington and Lawrence of Arabia: A Cautionary Tale, Fred D. Crawford writes

Much that shocked in 1955 is now standard knowledge – that TEL was illegitimate, that this profoundly troubled him, that he frequently resented his mother's dominance, that such reminiscences as T.E. Lawrence by His Friends are not reliable, that TEL's leg-pulling and other adolescent traits could be offensive, that TEL took liberties with the truth in his official reports and Seven Pillars, that the significance of his exploits during the Arab Revolt was more political than military, that he contributed to his own myth, that when he vetted the books by Graves and Liddell Hart he let remain much that he knew was untrue, and that his feelings about publicity were ambiguous.

This has not prevented most post-Aldington biographers (including Fred D. Crawford, who studied Aldington's claims intensely) from expressing strong admiration for Lawrence's military, political, and writing achievements. Despite the generally deprecatory tenor of his "biographical inquiry", Aldington himself was not without words of praise for Lawrence; in outlining his goal of "clearing the ground a little and removing some of the rubbish that lies in the way of knowledge", he says that his doing so is "not to deny that Lawrence was a man of peculiar abilities", and calls him an "extraordinary man".

== Awards and commemorations ==
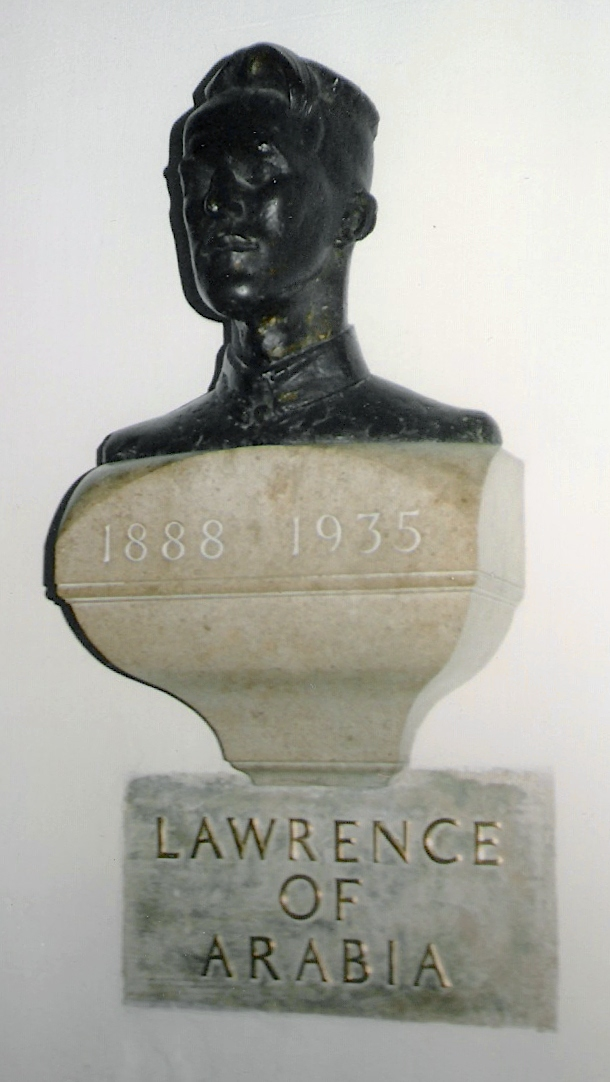
Eric Kennington's bust of Lawrence in St Paul's Cathedral, London

Lawrence's military exploits saw him mentioned in despatches on three occasions: by Sir John Maxwell (General Officer Commanding, Egypt) on 16 March 1916; by Sir Percy Lake (Commanding Indian Expeditionary Force D) on 12 August 1916; and by Sir Reginald Wingate (General Officer Commanding, Hedjaz) on 27 December 1918. He was the recipient of a number of high military honours: Companion of the Order of the Bath (Military) on 7 August 1917; Companion of the Distinguished Service Order on 10 May 1918; Knight of the Legion of Honour (France) on 30 May 1916 and the Croix de guerre (France) on 16 April 1918. King George V offered Lawrence a knighthood on 30 October 1918 at a private audience in Buckingham Palace for his services in the Arab Revolt, but he declined, on account of his view that British policy had constituted a betrayal of the Arab cause.

Artistic commemorations of Lawrence include a bronze bust by Eric Kennington in the crypt of St Paul's Cathedral, London, installed in January 1936 alongside the tombs of Britain's greatest military leaders, and a stone effigy, also by Kennington, which was placed in St Martin's Church, Wareham, Dorset in 1939. Jesus College commissioned a portrait by Alix Jennings as their official memorial.

Other celebrations of Lawrence's life include English Heritage blue plaques at his childhood home, 2 Polstead Road, Oxford and at his home in London, 14 Barton Street, Westminster. In 2002, he was voted 53rd in the BBC's list of the 100 Greatest Britons. In 2018, Lawrence was featured on a £5 commemorative coin issued within six-coin gold and silver proof sets marking the Centenary of the First World War. The series was produced by the Royal Mint in partnership with Imperial War Museums (IWM).

== In popular culture ==
=== Stage and screen ===
Interest in Lawrence as a source of artistic inspiration for stage and screen began in his lifetime. Lowell Thomas' films and lectures, With Allenby in Palestine and Lawrence in Arabia, were seen by over 3 million people in the early 1920s and made Lawrence an international celebrity. George Bernard Shaw, a friend, drew on Lawrence's character for the role of Private Napoleon Meek in his play of 1931, Too True to Be Good. Lawrence attended a performance of the play's original Worcestershire run and reportedly signed autographs for members of the audience. The producer Alexander Korda bought the film rights to The Seven Pillars in the mid-1930s, engaged Leslie Howard to play Lawrence and Winston Churchill as a consultant, and the production was in development at the time of Lawrence's death, although it was never ultimately made. The 1960s saw a revival of interest, beginning with Terence Rattigan's play Ross, which premiered in 1960, with Alec Guinness in the lead role. The play explored Lawrence's life as Aircraftsman Ross in the early 1930s. It was revived for a limited run at the Chichester Festival Theatre in 2016, with Joseph Fiennes playing the lead. In December 1962 David Lean's film, Lawrence of Arabia, was released, with Peter O'Toole in the title role. O'Toole was nominated for an Academy Award for Best Actor for his portrayal. The film was ranked in the top ten films of all time in the 2002 Sight and Sound directors' poll. A satirical portrayal towards the end of the 1960s was included in Alan Bennett's play Forty Years On (1968). Lawrence is depicted as "Tee Hee Lawrence" because of his high-pitched, feminine, laugh - "clad in the magnificent white silk robes of an Arab prince...he hoped to pass unnoticed through London. Alas he was mistaken."

In the 21st century, Robert Pattinson played Lawrence in Werner Herzog's 2015 film Queen of the Desert which centres on Gertrude Bell's time in Arabia and depicts the friendship between the pair. On stage, The Oxford Roof Climbers Rebellion, written by Stephen Massicotte and premiered in Toronto in 2006, explored Lawrence's reactions to war, and his friendship with Robert Graves. His retreat from public life formed the subject of Howard Brenton's play Lawrence After Arabia, commissioned for a 2016 premiere at the Hampstead Theatre to mark the centenary of the outbreak of the Arab Revolt.

=== Literature ===
The Canadian poet Gwendolyn MacEwen's collection The T.E. Lawrence Poems, published in 1982, draws directly on Lawrence's writings, particularly Seven Pillars and the collected letters. Dreaming of Samarkand, a novel by Martin Booth published in 1989, is a fictionalised account of Lawrence's time in Carchemish, and his relationship with James Elroy Flecker. In 2000, David Stevens published The Waters of Babylon, a novel concerning Lawrence's time in the RAF in which he reflects on his past and enters into a relationship with a (fictional) airman named Slaney. Dreamers of the Day, written by Mary Doria Russell in 2008, follows a fictional protagonist Agnes Shankin at the 1921 Cairo Peace Conference, and her interactions with Lawrence, as well as with Winston Churchill and Gertrude Bell.

== See also ==
- Kingdom of Iraq (1932–1958)
- Lawrence of Arabia Medal of the Royal Society for Asian Affairs

Related individuals

- Richard Meinertzhagen (1878–1967), British intelligence officer and ornithologist, on occasion a colleague of Lawrence's
- Rafael de Nogales Méndez (1879–1937), Venezuelan officer who served in the Ottoman Army and was compared to Lawrence
- Suleiman Mousa (1919–2008), Jordanian historian who wrote about Lawrence
- Oskar von Niedermayer (1885–1948), German officer, professor and spy, sometimes referred to as the German Lawrence
- Max von Oppenheim (1860–1946), German-Jewish lawyer, diplomat and archaeologist. Lawrence called his travelogue "the best book on the [Middle East] area I know".
- Wilhelm Wassmuss (1880–1931), German diplomat and spy, known as "Wassmuss of Persia" and compared to Lawrence
- Suzuki Keiji (1897–1967), Japanese intelligence officer, compared to Lawrence

== Published works ==
=== Autobiographical and war books ===
- The 1911 Diary of a Journey across the Euphrates
- Military Report on the Sinai Peninsula (1914) restricted publication by the War Office General Staff. Published by Castle Hill Press (1990)
- Military Handbook on Palestine (1917)
- Arab Memorandum to the Paris Peace Conference (1919)
- Sidelights on the Arab War (1919) – article published in The Times on 4 September 1919.
- The Arab Revolt (1920) - earliest surviving but still unpublished manuscript of approximately 400,000 words of the Seven Pillars of Wisdom authenticated by A. W. Lawrence with a letter and held currently by the Harry Ransom Center of the University of Texas
- Seven Pillars of Wisdom, (1922, revised and shortened in 1926) – an account of Lawrence's part in the Arab Revolt. (ISBN 0-8488-0562-3) The 1922 Oxford text contains introduction and 10 books with 139 chapters, an epilogue, and 2 appendices and the 1926 Subscribers' edition also contains introduction and 10 books but 122 chapters and a truncated epilogue and 2 appendices.
- Revolt in the Desert, a further abridged 37-chapter version of Seven Pillars of Wisdom published for the general public. (ISBN 1-56619-275-7)
- Guerrilla Warfare, article in the 1929 Encyclopaedia Britannica

==== Posthumous books and collections ====
- Crusader Castles, Lawrence's Oxford BA thesis in 1910. London: Michael Haag 1986 (ISBN 0-902743-53-8). The first edition was published in London in 1936 by the Golden Cockerel Press, in 2 volumes, limited to 1000 copies.
- The Mint, (1955) – an account of Lawrence's service in the Royal Air Force. (ISBN 0-393-00196-2)
- Myself – obituary published in the Evening Standard
- Oriental Assembly (1939) - contains the suppressed chapter from the Seven Pillars of Wisdom and other related materials
- Secret Despatches from Arabia (1939) – expanded as Wartime Diaries and Letters (1990)
- The Essential T.E. Lawrence (1951)
- The Evolution of a Revolt: Early Post-War Writings (1968)
- Seven Pillars of Wisdom: A Triumph 1922 and 1926 Parallel Texts (2-volume set edited by Jeremy Wilson, 2008). Per the publisher's limitation statement, the edition was limited to 50 sets, of which sets numbered 1-37 were bound in quarter goatskin and sets numbered i-xiii were "reserved". The 37 sets are bound in the publisher’s quarter brown Morocco goatskin with brown buckram sides, the contents bound with brown endpapers, brown top edge stain, and silk head and tail bands. The two volumes are housed in the publisher’s stout, unadorned brown buckram slipcase.
- Towards 'An English Fourth' (2009)
- War in the Desert (2016) – the abandoned 77-chapter abridgement of the 1922 Oxford Text of Seven Pillars of Wisdom that has never been published before, co-authored with Edward Garnett (Edited by Nicole and Jeremy Wilson)
- The Advance of the Egyptian Expeditionary Force

==== Selected correspondence ====
- Letters from T.E. Shaw to Viscount Carlow (1936) – 17 privately printed copies
- The Letters of T.E. Lawrence edited by David Garnett. (1938, corrected edition – 1964)
- T.E. Lawrence to his Biographer Robert Graves, edited by Robert Graves and B. H. Liddell Hart
- The Letters of T.E. Lawrence selected and edited by Malcolm Brown. London, J. M Dent. 1988 (ISBN 0-460-04733-7)
- Eight Letters from T.E.L. [to Harley Granville-Barker] – Privately printed, 1939, fifty copies.
- C. Sydney Smith, The Golden Reign (Contains fifty letters from Lawrence to Sydney Smith) London, Cassell, 1940.
- H. S. Ede (ed.), Shaw—Ede, T.E. Lawrence's Letters to H. S. Ede 1927–1935 London, Golden Cockerel Press, 1942, 500 copies.
- M. R. Lawrence (ed.), The Home Letters of T.E. Lawrence and his Brothers Oxford, Basil Blackwell; NY, Macmillan, 1954
- T.E.L. Five Hitherto Unpublished Letters [to R. V. Buxton] – Privately printed, 1975, fifty copies.
- H. Montgomery Hyde, Solitary in the Ranks, Lawrence of Arabia as Airman and Private Soldier (An account of Lawrence's service life built around his correspondence with Lord Trenchard.) London, Constable, 1977; New York, Atheneum, 1978.

Edited by Jeremy and Nicole Wilson, Castle Hill Press

1. Letters from T.E. Lawrence to E.T. Leeds Andoversford (1988). Whittington Press
2. T.E. Lawrence. Letters
3. Correspondence with Bernard and Charlotte Shaw (4 volumes) (1922–35)
4. Boats for the RAF (1929–35)
5. Correspondence with E. M. Forster and F.L. Lucas
6. More Correspondence with Writers
7. Correspondence with Edward and David Garnett
8. Correspondence with Henry Williamson
9. Correspondence with the Political Elite 1922–1935
10. Translating the Bruce Rogers Odyssey
11. T.E. Lawrence, Bruce Rogers, and Homer's Odyssey
12. Printing and Illustrating Seven Pillars of Wisdom

=== Archaeological books (co-authored with Leonard Woolley) ===
- The Wilderness of Zin London, Harrison and Sons, (1914)
- Carchemish – Report on the Excavations at Djerabis on Behalf of the British Museum (1914) – 2 volumes

=== Essays and literary criticism ===
- Men in Print (1940)

=== Poetry ===
- Minorities: Good Poems by Small Poets and Small Poems by Good Poets, edited by Jeremy Wilson, 1971. Lawrence's commonplace book includes an introduction by Wilson that explains how the poems comprising the book reflected Lawrence's life and thoughts.

=== As editor ===
- Garroot: Adventures of a Clydeside Apprentice (1933) by Ian McKinnon (Pseudonym: I. Tyre). London. Jonathan Cape

=== English translations ===
- The Odyssey of Homer – translation from the Ancient Greek, first published in 1932. (ISBN 0-19-506818-1)
- A Poem by Faisal I of Iraq – translation from the Arabic
- 2 Arabic Folktales (1937) – posthumously published translation from the Arabic
- The Forest Giant by Adrien Le Corbeau, novel, translation from the French (1924).

== Sources ==
- Aldington, Richard (1955). Lawrence of Arabia: A biographical enquiry. London: Collins.ISBN 978-1-122-22259-4
- Allen, Malcolm Dennis (1991). The Medievalism of Lawrence of Arabia. Pennsylvania State University Press. ISBN 978-0-271-07328-6.
- Asher, Michael (1998). Lawrence: The uncrowned king of Arabia. Viking.
- Axelrod, Alan (2009). Little-Known Wars of Great and Lasting Impact. Fair Winds. ISBN 978-1-61673-461-9.
- Barnes, David (2005). The Companion Guide to Wales. Companion Guides. ISBN 978-1-900639-43-9.
- Barr, James (2008). Setting the Desert on Fire: T.E. Lawrence and Britain's Secret War in Arabia 1916–1918. W.W. Norton & Company. ISBN 978-0-393-07095-8.
- Beeson, C.F.C. (1989). Clockmaking in Oxfordshire 1400–1850. Oxford: Museum of the History of Science. ISBN 978-0-903364-06-5.
- Brown, Malcolm (2005). Lawrence of Arabia: The life, the legend. London: Thames & Hudson / [In association with] Imperial War Museum. ISBN 978-0-500-51238-8 – via Internet Archive (archive.org).
- Crawford, Fred D. (1998). Aldington and Lawrence of Arabia: A cautionary tale. Carbondale and Edwardsville: Southern Illinois University Press. ISBN 978-0-8093-2166-7.
- Graves, Robert (1934). Lawrence and the Arabs. London: Jonathan Cape – via Internet Archive (archive.org). Also free on Project Gutenberg.
- Graves, Robert (1928). Lawrence and the Arabian Adventure. New York: Doubleday – via Internet Archive (archive.org).
- Knightley, Phillip; Simpson, Colin (1970). The Secret Lives of Lawrence of Arabia. McGraw-Hill. ISBN 978-1-299-17719-2.
- Korda, M. (2010). Hero: The Life and Legend of Lawrence of Arabia. Harper. ISBN 978-0-06-171261-6 – via Internet Archive (archive.org).
- Lawrence, A.W. (1937). T.E. Lawrence by His Friends. Doubleday – via Google Books.
- Lawrence, T.E. (1926). Seven Pillars of Wisdom. Subscribers' – via Internet Archive (archive.org).ISBN 9780385418959
- Lawrence, T.E. (1935). Seven Pillars of Wisdom. Garden City, NY: Doubleday.ISBN 978-0-385-07015-7
- Mack, John E. (1976). A Prince of Our Disorder: The Life of T.E. Lawrence. Boston: Little, Brown. ISBN 978-0-316-54232-6 – via Internet Archive (archive.org).
- Murphy, David (2008). The Arab Revolt 1916–18: Lawrence sets Arabia ablaze. Osprey Publishing.
- Orlans, Harold (2002). T.E. Lawrence: Biography of a broken hero. Jefferson, NC / London: McFarland. ISBN 978-0-7864-1307-2.
- Penaud, Guy (2007). Le Tour de France de Lawrence d'Arabie (1908). Périgueux, France: Editions de La Lauze. ISBN 978-2-35249-024-1.
- Tabachnick, Stephen E. (1984). The T.E. Lawrence Puzzle. University of Georgia Press.
- Tauber, Eliezer (1995). The Formation of Modern Syria and Iraq. Frank Cass and Co. ISBN 978-1-135-20118-0.
- Wilson, J. (1989). Lawrence of Arabia: The Authorised Biography of T.E. Lawrence. Atheneum. ISBN 978-0-689-11934-7 – via Internet Archive (archive.org).
- Woolley, Leonard (1954). Dead Towns and Living Men. London and Tonbridge: The Whitefriars Press.
