= St Nicholas' Church, Moreton =

St Nicholas'
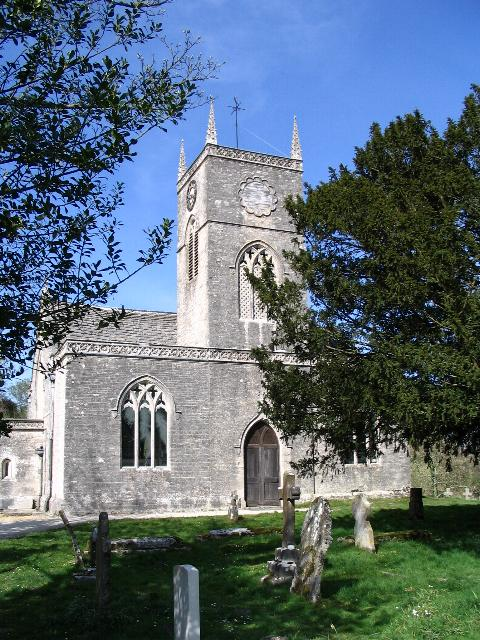
- St Nicholas'
- 50.702834°N 2.276956°W
- Location: Moreton, Dorset
- Country: England
- Denomination: Church of England
- Website: www.stnicholasmoreton.org.uk

History
- Dedication: St Nicholas

Architecture
- Style: -

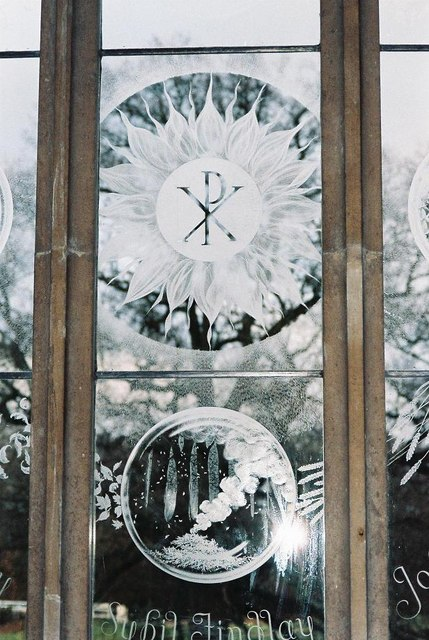
Window number 3

St Nicholas' is a Church of England parish church at Moreton, Dorset, England. It is known for its thirteen windows, engraved by the poet and artist Sir Laurence Whistler. T. E. Lawrence was buried in the separate churchyard.

== History ==
St Nicholas' Church is a Grade II* listed building. The church's dedication was changed in 1490, to St Nicholas having previously been dedicated to St Magnus Martyr.

The church was rebuilt in 1776, reusing medieval foundations and is considered a good example of the early Gothic Revival. The rebuilding was financed by the Frampton family, who lived in the nearby manor house. The north aisle was added in 1841 and most internal fittings were renewed c1847.

Colonel T. E. Lawrence ("Lawrence of Arabia"), who died in 1935, is buried in the separate churchyard. He was a cousin of the Frampton family and had been a frequent visitor to their home, Okers Wood House. Lawrence's mother arranged with the Framptons to have him buried in their family plot in the separate burial ground of St Nicholas' Church. Mourners included Winston and Clementine Churchill, E. M. Forster, and Lawrence's youngest brother Arnold.

In 1940, the church suffered a direct hit from a German bomb, and was largely destroyed. It was rebuilt over the following decade, but the stained glass windows were replaced with plain green glass, which was not liked by the congregation.

== Windows ==
Laurence Whistler was commissioned to provide engraved glass replacements, and after making twelve, he offered to make and donate the thirteenth with a design on the theme of Forgiveness featuring Judas. The offer was declined, but he made the window anyway. After being displayed in a local museum, it was eventually installed - on the outside of the church (as the artist intended) - in 2014.

The windows are:

1. 1955: Apse
2. 1955: Apse
3. 1955: Apse
4. 1955: Apse
5. 1955: Apse
6. 1974: The Seasons, North aisle
7. 1975: Light
8. 1975: Darkness
9. 1975: Dream of the Rood
10. 1982: Trinity Chapel
11. 1984: Vestry
12. 1984: West End
13. 2014: Forgiveness
