= Adam Frampton =

US architect and educator

Adam Snow Frampton
- Born: 1980 (age 45–46); Washington, DC
- Education: B.EnvD, University of Colorado at Boulder, 2002; MArch, Princeton University School of Architecture, 2006
- Occupation: Architect

Adam Snow Frampton is an American architect and educator. He is a Principal of Only If, a New York City-based design practice for architecture and urbanism, founded in 2013, together with architect Karolina Czeczek. He is the co-author of the pedestrian-centric Cities Without Ground: A Hong Kong Guidebook. He has been celebrated at the 12th, 14th, and 16th Venice Biennale of Architecture.

He is also a Design Critic at the Harvard Graduate School of Design. He has previously taught as the Gensler Visiting Critic at Cornell University AAP, as a Visiting Critic at Rice University's School of Architecture, as Adjunct Assistant Professor at Columbia Graduate School of Architecture, Planning and Preservation., as a Visiting assistant professor at the University of Kentucky College of Design, and as a Visiting Critic at the Syracuse University School of Architecture.

== Professional life ==
Adam Snow Frampton studied architecture at the University of Colorado at Boulder (B.EnvD, 2002) and the Princeton University School of Architecture (MArch 2006).

From 2006 to 2013, Adam Snow Frampton worked at the Office for Metropolitan Architecture (OMA) in Rotterdam and Hong Kong as an Associate. He was a key leader in the design and construction of the Taipei Performing Arts Center from 2008 to 2013.

In 2013, Frampton founded Only If, a New York City-based practice for architecture and urbanism. Only If is engaged a range of design projects at different scales, from small interiors and single family housing to multi-family housing and larger-scale urban design, research and speculation. Only If's notable realized works include small interiors such as Voyager Espresso, City of Saints Bryant Park, and An Office for Three Companies. In 2017, Only If was selected to contribute to the Regional Plan Association's Fourth Regional Plan. In 2019, Only If won an international open competition organized by the American Institute of Architects New York chapter and the New York City Department of Housing Preservation and Development to design and develop affordable housing on vacant irregular lots, a topic the firm had previously been researching for several years and which is also related to Only If's ongoing Narrow House.

== Awards and Recognitions ==
- Architectural Record, Design Vanguard (2022)
- Domus, 50 Best Architecture Firms (2020)
- Architect Magazine, Next Progressives (2019)
- AIA New York, New Practices New York (2018)
- Pin-Up Magazine, New Power Generation (2016)
- World Interior News, Emerging Interior Practice of the Year (2016)

== Published works ==
- Frampton, Adam; Solomon, Jonathan D; Wong, Clara (2012). Cities Without Ground: A Hong Kong Guidebook. San Francisco: ORO Editions. ISBN 978-1-935935-32-2.
