= Frampton, Vale of Glamorgan =

Coordinates: 51.421044°N 3.477093°W

Frampton
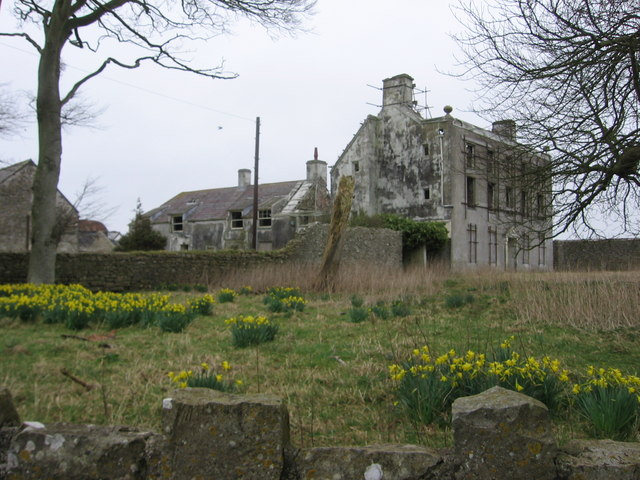
- Great Frampton

- Location within the Vale of Glamorgan
- Principal area: Vale of Glamorgan
- Preserved county: South Glamorgan
- Country: Wales
- Sovereign state: United Kingdom
- Postcode district: CF
- Police: South Wales
- Fire: South Wales
- Ambulance: Welsh
- UK Parliament: Vale of Glamorgan
- Senedd Cymru – Welsh Parliament: Vale of Glamorgan

Frampton is a hamlet in the Vale of Glamorgan in South Wales. It lies within the parish of Llantwit Major, to the north of the town off the B4265 road, 4.25 miles (6.84 km) south-southwest of Cowbridge. It is divided into Little Frampton and Great Frampton.

== History ==
The settlement's name is believed to be named after Adam De Francton, an English knight who killed Llewelyn, the last Prince of Wales. The hamlet became known for its Frampton Herd of Pedigree Aberdeen Angus.

== Great Frampton ==
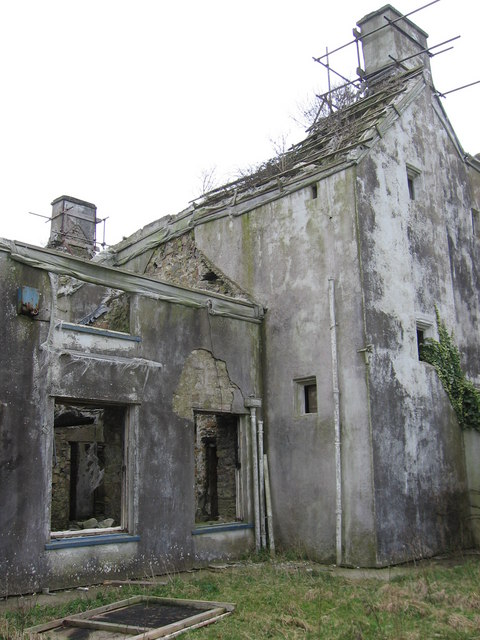
The ruins of Great Frampton

The hamlet contains the ruins of Great Frampton, a Grade II listed country house which is located about 1,300 metres (4,300 ft) northwest of the Church of St. Illtyd. The house was built around 1600, with a front added in the late 18th century. An inventory of the house was made in 1636 upon the death of Mary Jones, a widow who owned the property at the time. In the 1770s, the astronomer Nathaniel Pigott stayed at Frampton and built an observatory.

The house is of three storeys, with a front elevation containing five bays. It was badly damaged in a fire in 1994. It gutted the main block, but the rear wing, dated to the 17th century and altered in the mid 20th century, still remains, though in a derelict state.
