= Mary Featherstonhaugh Frampton =

Mary Featherstonhaugh Frampton MBE; (16 February 1928 – 28 August 2014), was a British civil servant who worked as clerk in charge of the Serjeant at Arms' Department in the House of Commons.

She was initially employed as a shorthand typist in the Committee Office in November 1948, moving to the Serjeant at Arms department soon afterwards when a job opportunity arose. She worked for five successive Serjeants, was made MBE in 1967 and rose to become Clerk in Charge of the office. Her responsibilities included serving warrants on behalf of Select Committees and allocating office accommodation. Most notably she served a warrant on Arthur Scargill, ordering him to appear before a Select Committee in 1982.

Tam Dalyell, writing for her obituary in The Independent, wrote that Frampton was one of "a number of ladies in the Palace of Westminster who would not have been offended had I described them as tanks – heavily armoured Panzers with 88mm guns, at that".

Betty Boothroyd, former Speaker of the House of Commons, wrote about the time that Frampton in 1978 served a writ on Sir Charles Villiers, and that Frampton was recognised as a "formidable stickler for the rules".

Frampton left an oral history recording in the British Library.
