= Mary Frampton =

English diarist and botanist (1773–1846)

Mary Frampton (7 June 1773 – 1846) was an English diarist and botanist.

== Biography ==
Mary Frampton was born on 7 June 1773 in Moreton, Dorset. Her father was James Frampton and her mother was Phillis Frampton, ex-wife of Charlton Wollaston. Frampton would regularly travel to London with her parents and witnessed the Gordon Riots and the trial of Warren Hastings. Her father died in 1784 and Frampton settled in Dorchester with her mother, where they were central to local society.

Frampton kept a diary from a young age; this was published as The Journal of Mary Frampton, From The Year 1779 to Until The Year 1846 in 1885. It starts in 1803, with memories from 1779, and includes correspondence with Frampton's friends, as well as notes by Frampton's niece and editor, Harriot Mundy. Her journal is regarded as a good source of Regency and Victorian Thought and details important events in British politics during her lifetime. It is a reference on 18th century fashion, politics, and economics. Her thoughts were influential to the works of John Bull. The journal also gives insight to the affairs of royal court at the time, as the Framptons were friendly with the family of George III, who would regularly visit the area.

Frampton also spent time studying Dorset's botany, producing many drawings of the flora of the county which ran to five volumes. Her drawings and records were included in the botanical index of History of Poole in 1839. Frampton died in Dorchester on 12 November 1846.

== Bibliography ==
- Frampton, Mary (1885). The journal of Mary Frampton, from the year 1779, until the year 1846. Including various interesting and curious letters, anecdotes, &c., relating to events which occurred during that period. London, S. Low, Marston, Searle, & Rivington.
