= List of Southampton F.C. players (25–99 appearances) =

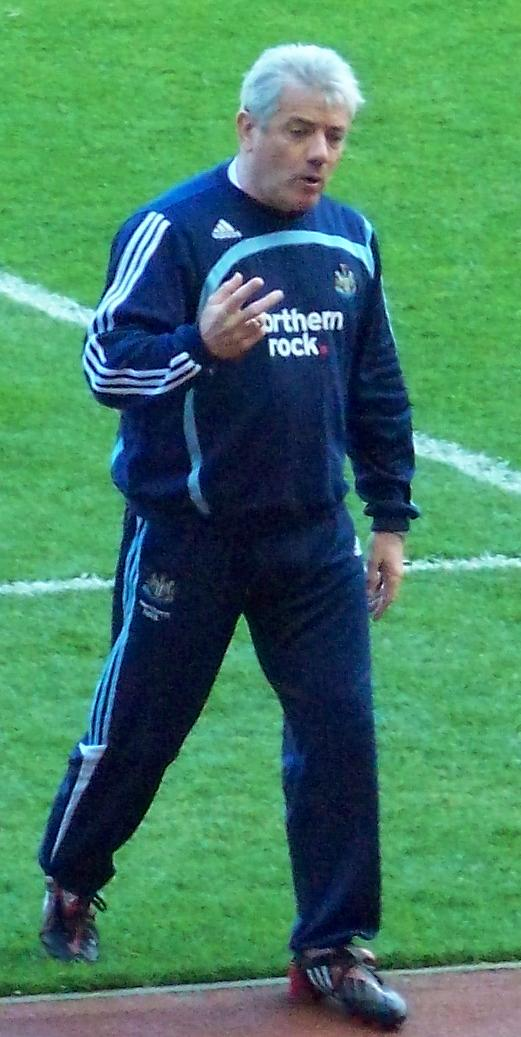
Kevin Keegan made 80 appearances for Southampton, and is the only player in the club's history to win the PFA Players' Player of the Year award (in 1982).

Southampton Football Club is an English association football club based in Southampton, Hampshire. Founded in 1885 as St Mary's YMA, they became a professional club in 1891 and co-founded the Southern Football League in 1894. Southampton won the Southern League Premier Division championship six times between 1896 and 1904, and were later elected to the Football League Third Division in 1920. The Saints finished as runners-up in their first Football League season, and the following year received promotion to the Second Division as Third Division South champions. The club first entered the First Division in 1966, and currently play in its modern-day counterpart, the Premier League. Southampton won the FA Cup in 1976, reached the final of the League Cup in 1979 and 2017, and won the League Trophy in 2010.

Since the club's formation, a total of 374 players have made between 25 and 99 appearances for Southampton. Of these, 12 players have made exactly 25 appearances for the club, while only two (Bob Petrie and Cyril King) have made 99. Ted Drake, who played as a centre-forward for Southampton between 1931 and 1934, has scored the most goals of any player with between 25 and 99 appearances for the club, with 49 in all competitions; five more players have scored over 40 goals for the Saints. Eight of the 359 players listed – Kevin Keegan, Derek Statham, Dean Richards, Peter Crouch, Chris Baird, Andrew Davies, Roméo Lavia and Mateus Fernandes – have won the Southampton F.C. Player of the Season award as voted for by readers of the Southern Daily Echo, while former team captain Virgil van Dijk and Léo Scienza have won the clubs own Player of the Season award.

== Key ==
- The list is ordered first by date of debut, and then if necessary in alphabetical order by surname.
- Appearances as a substitute are included. This feature of the game was introduced in the Football League at the start of the 1965–66 season.
- Statistics are correct up to and including the match played on 21 November 2026. Where a player left the club permanently after this date, his statistics are updated to his date of leaving.

Positions key
| Pre-1960s | | 1960s– | |
|---|---|---|---|
| GK | Goalkeeper | | |
| FB | Full back | DF | Defender |
| HB | Half back | MF | Midfielder |
| FW | Forward | | |

Nationality
Unless otherwise noted, the nationality of a player is determined by the country for which he has played or, if he has not played international football, his country of birth.
Position
Playing positions are listed according to the tactical formations that were employed at the time. The change in the names of defensive and midfield positions reflects the tactical evolution that occurred from the 1960s onwards.
Club career
Club career is defined as the first and last calendar years in which the player appeared for the club in any of the competitions listed below.
Total appearances and Total goals
Total appearances and goals comprise those in the Southern League, Wessex League, Football League, Premier League, Southern Alliance, Southern District Combination, United League, FA Cup, League/EFL Cup, FA Charity/Community Shield, League/EFL Trophy, Inter-Cities Fairs Cup, UEFA Europa League/UEFA Cup, UEFA Cup Winners' Cup, Southern Floodlit Cup, Southern Charity Cup, Texaco Cup, Full Members Cup, Hampshire Senior Cup, Hampshire Junior Cup, Hampshire Benevolent Cup, Hampshire County Cricket Club Charity Cup, Portsmouth Cup, Rowland Hospital Cup and Victory Cup. Wartime competitions are excluded.

== Players ==
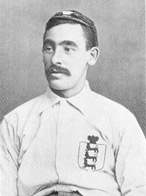
Edgar Chadwick played 87 times for Southampton, scoring 31 goals.

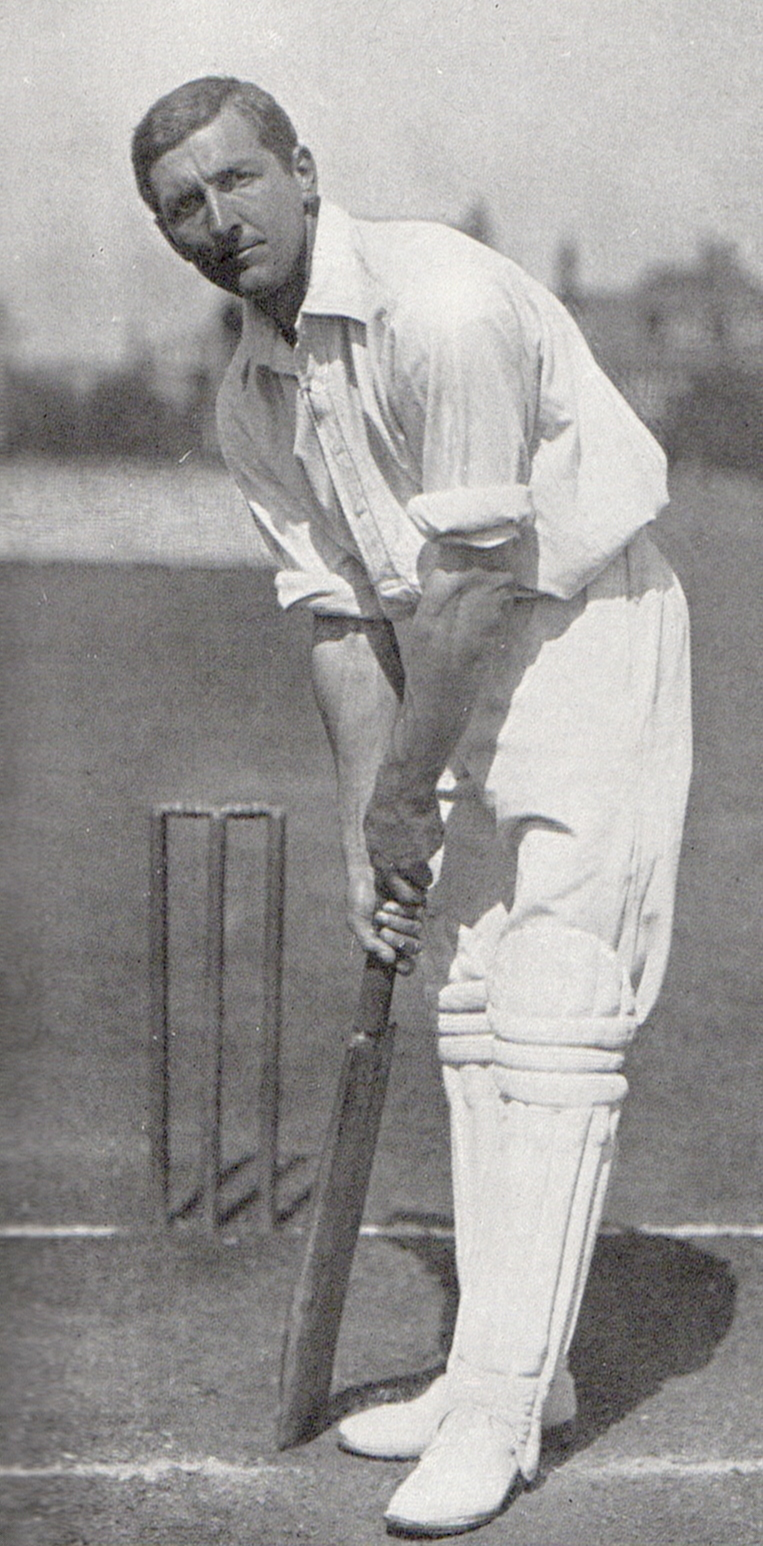
C. B. Fry played 29 times for the club from 1900 to 1902.

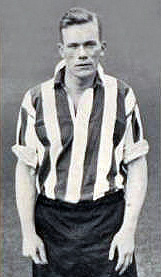
Jimmy Dunne was the club's top goalscorer in the 1936–37 season.

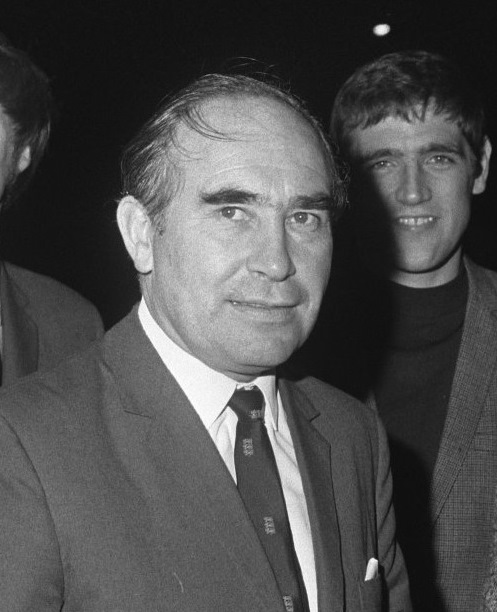
Alf Ramsey began his playing career at Southampton, making 96 appearances for the Saints.

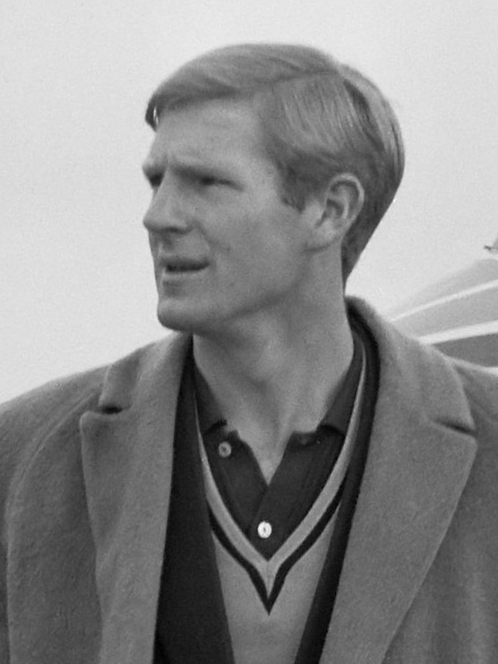
Frank Saul joined the Saints in 1968 and played 68 times for the club before leaving in 1970.

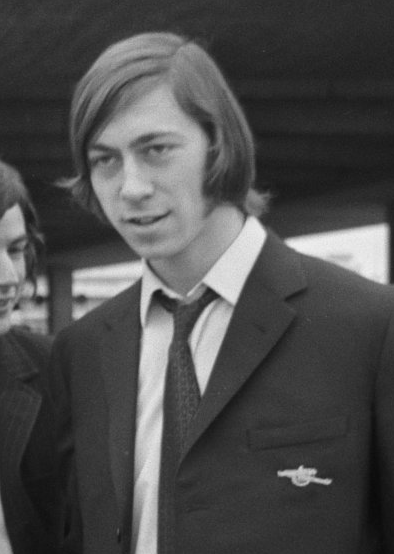
Charlie George played 52 times for Southampton.

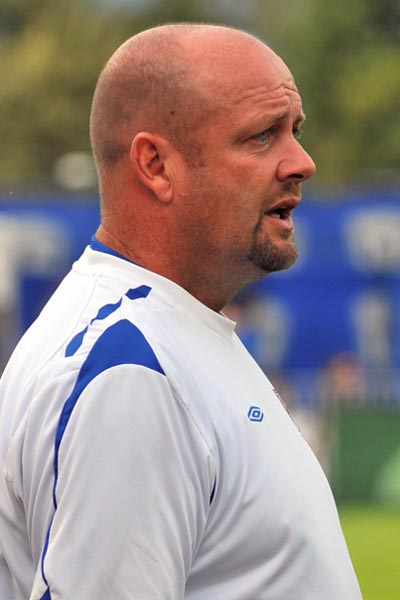
Colin Clarke scored 39 times in 98 games for the Saints.

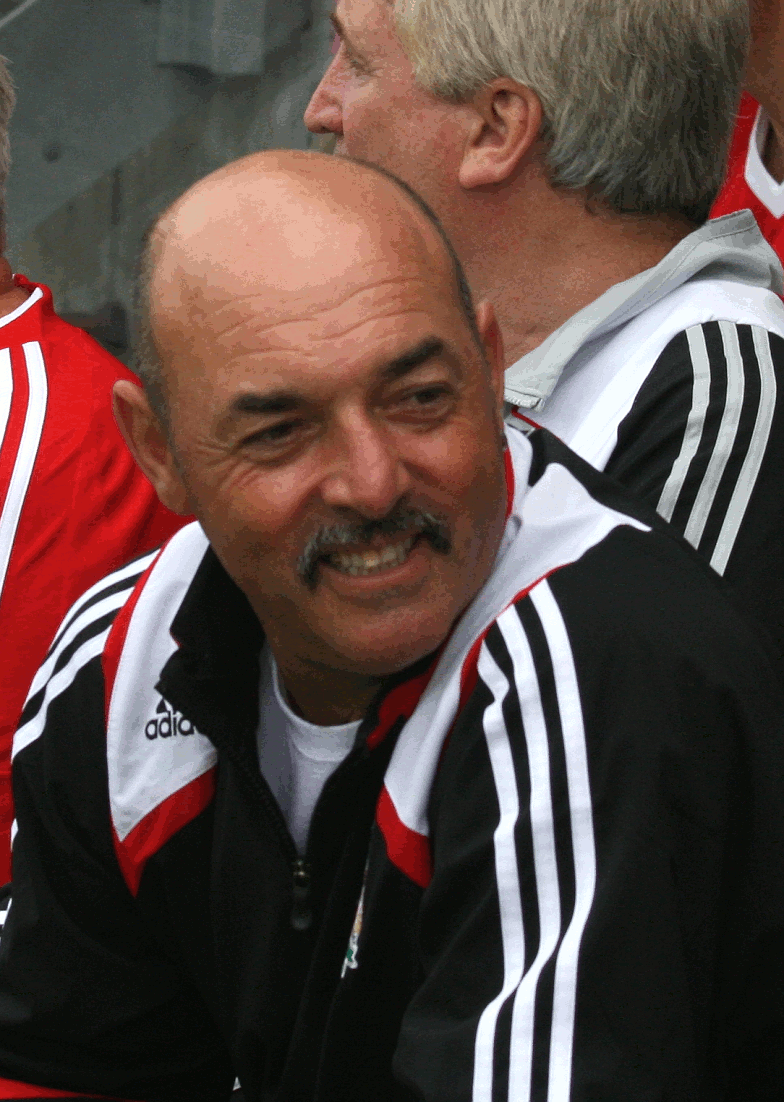
Bruce Grobbelaar made 45 appearances for Southampton in two seasons at the club.

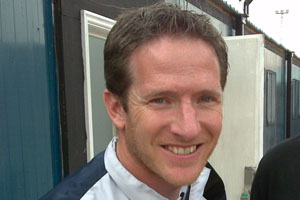
Welsh defender Alan Neilson, who made 63 appearances in two seasons at Southampton.

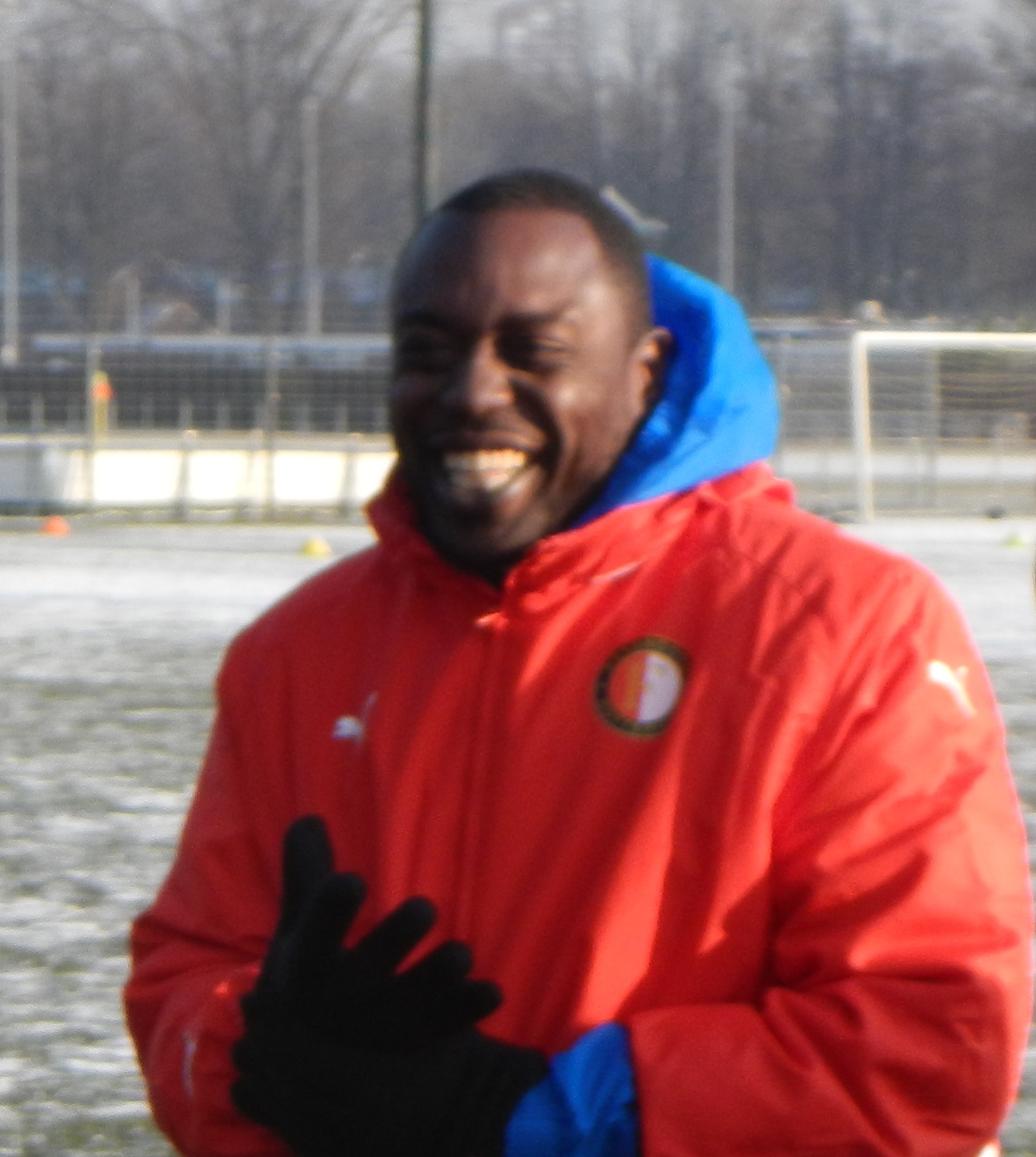
Dutch international Ulrich van Gobbel made 94 appearances for Southampton.

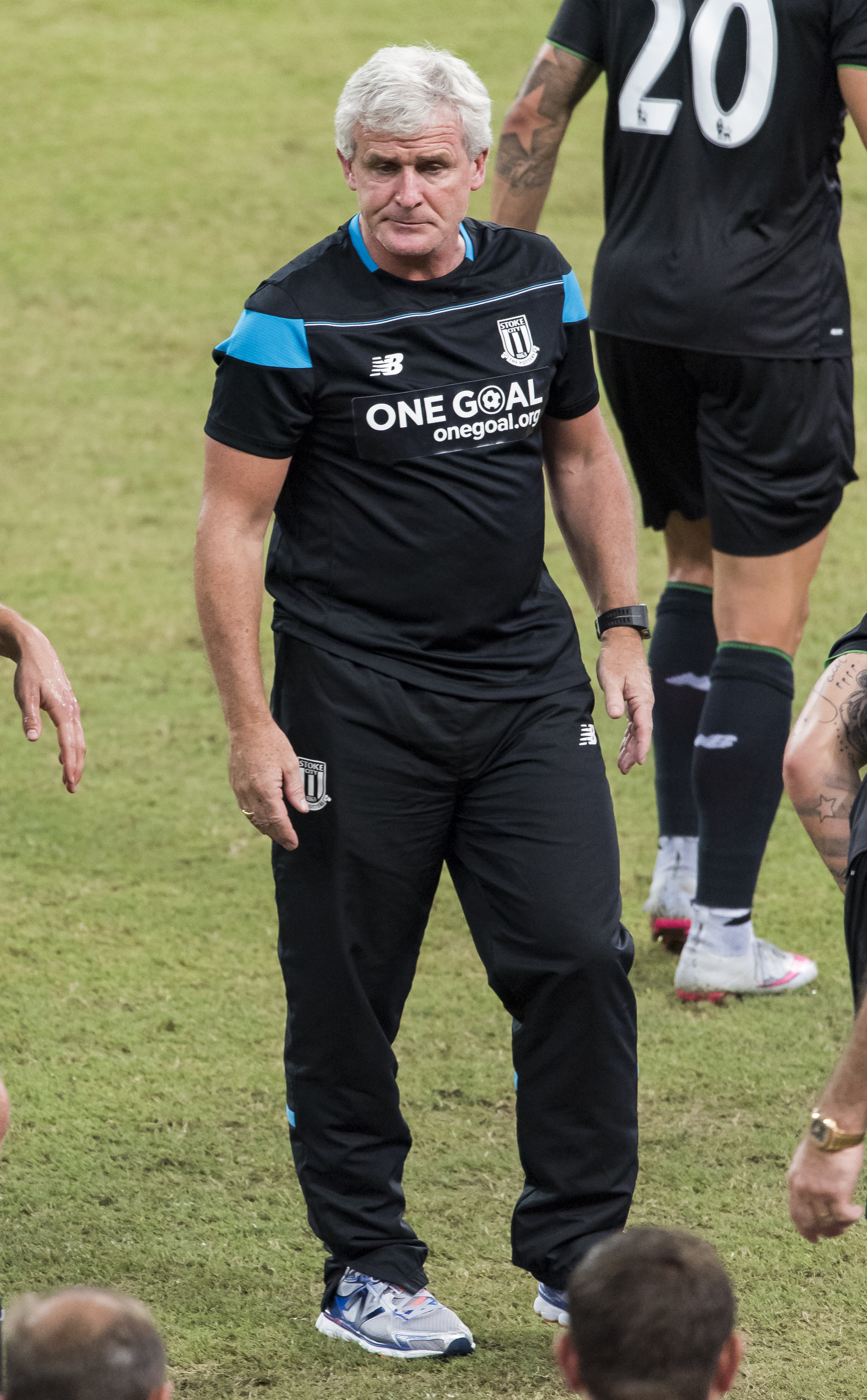
Former Manchester United striker Mark Hughes played 60 games for Southampton.

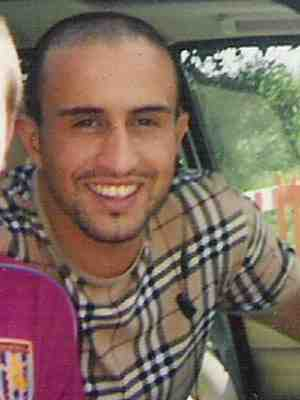
Hassan Kachloul scored 15 goals in 96 Saints appearances.

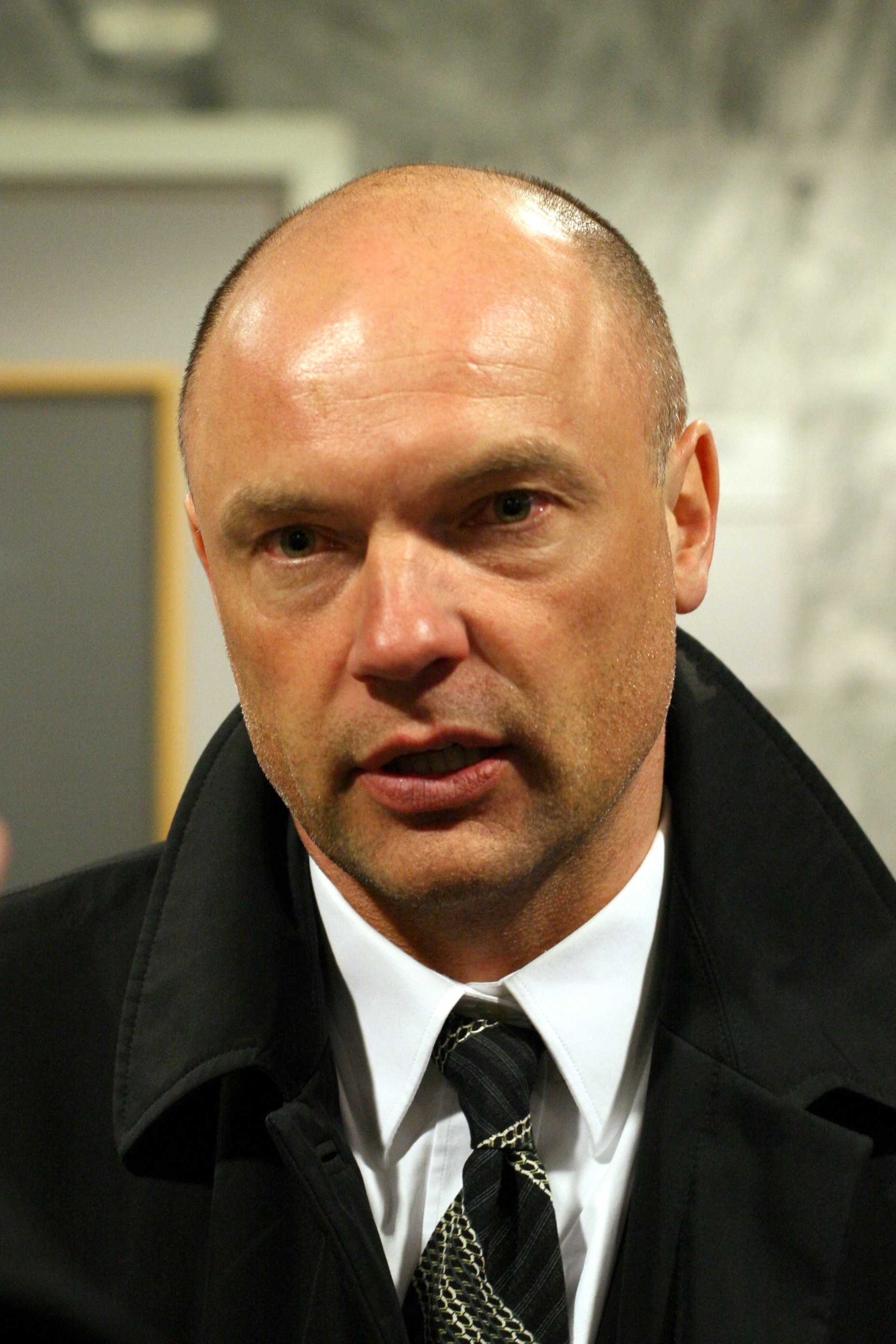
German striker Uwe Rösler made 29 appearances for Southampton.

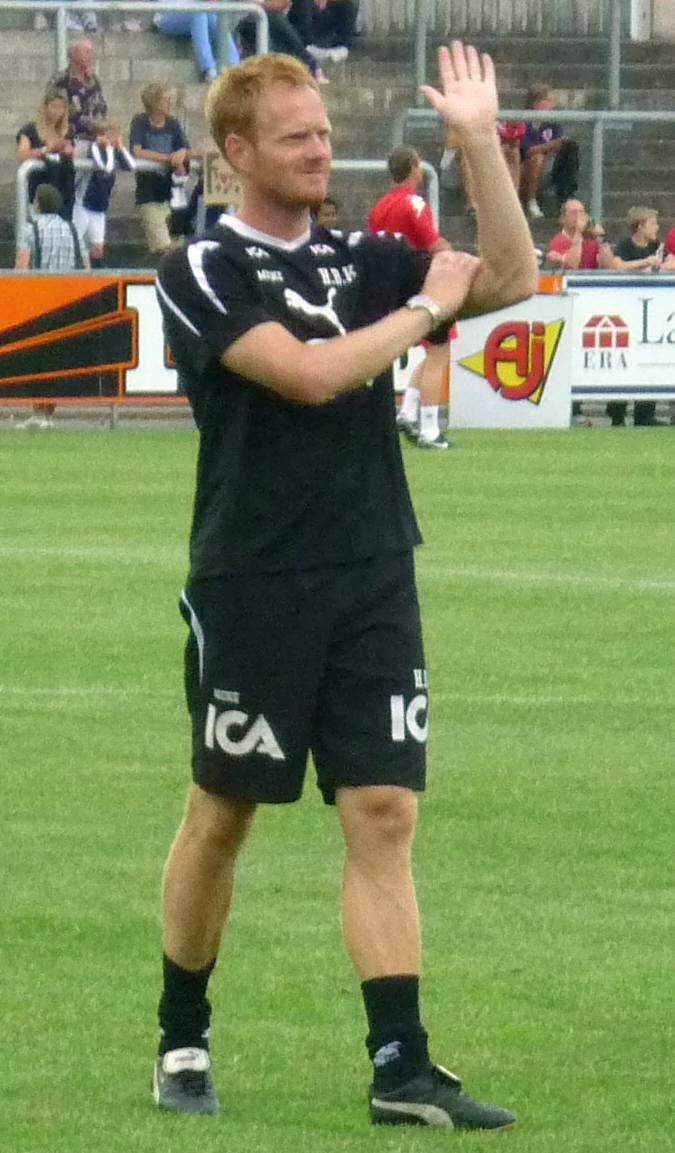
Swedish centre-back Michael Svensson played 87 times for the club between 2002 and 2008.

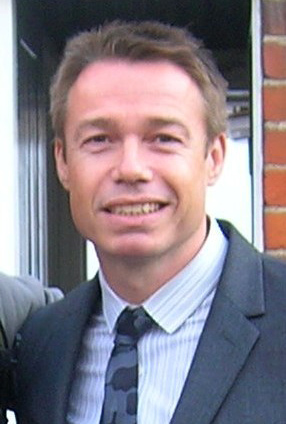
Graeme Le Saux finished his career at Southampton in 2005.

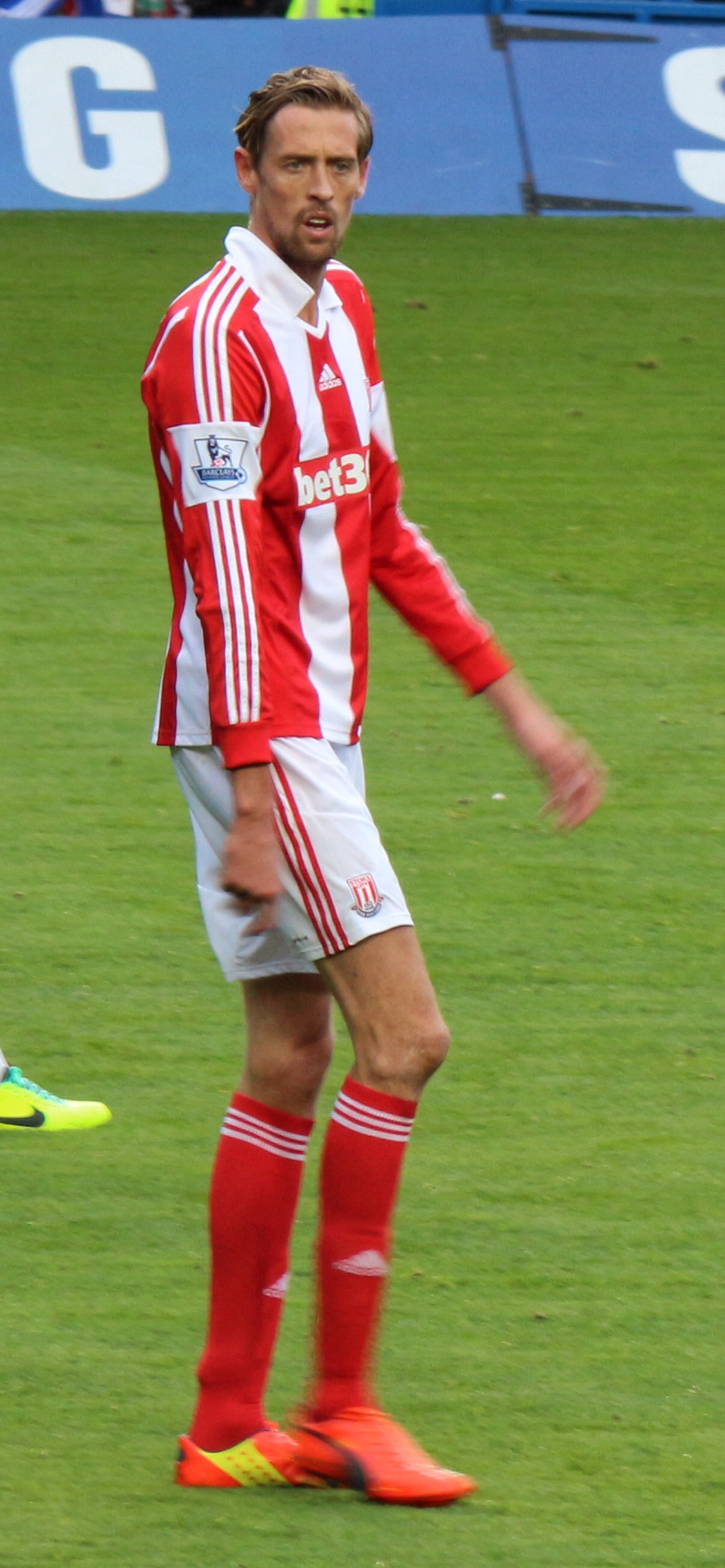
Peter Crouch was named Southampton's player of the year in his only season at the club.

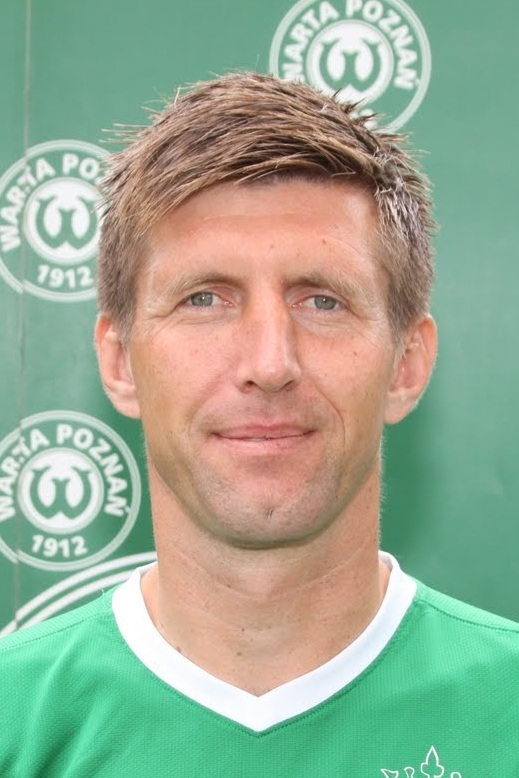
Grzegorz Rasiak was the club's top goalscorer in the 2006–07 season.

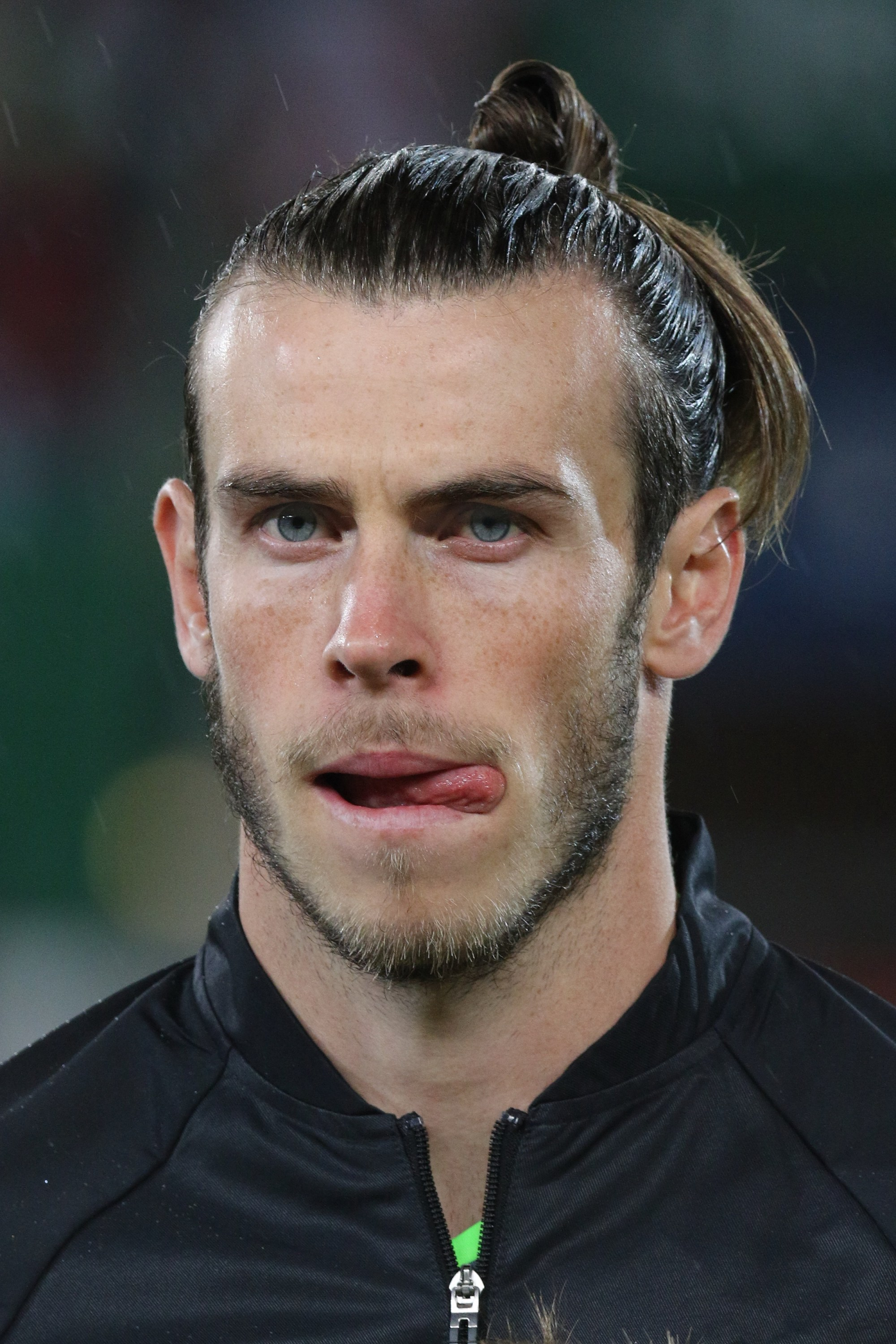
Gareth Bale played 45 times in the 2006–07 season.

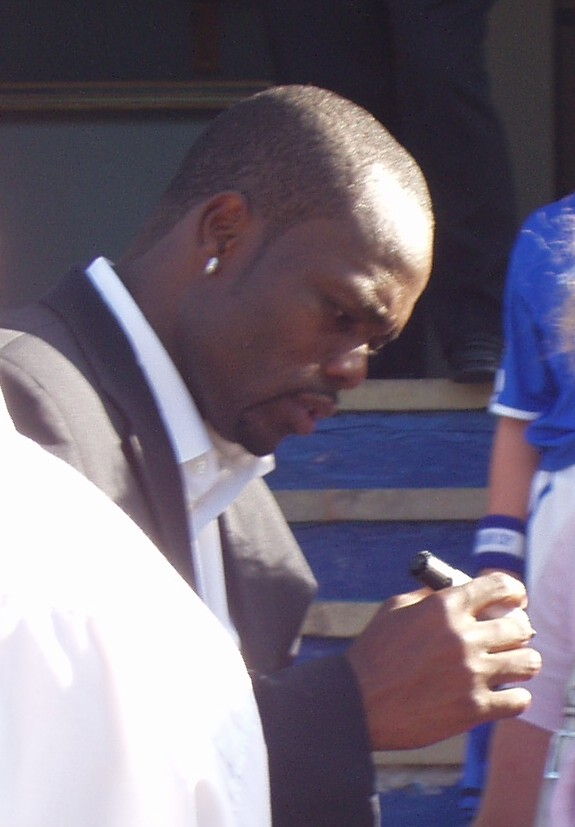
Stern John scored 20 goals in 52 games for the Saints.

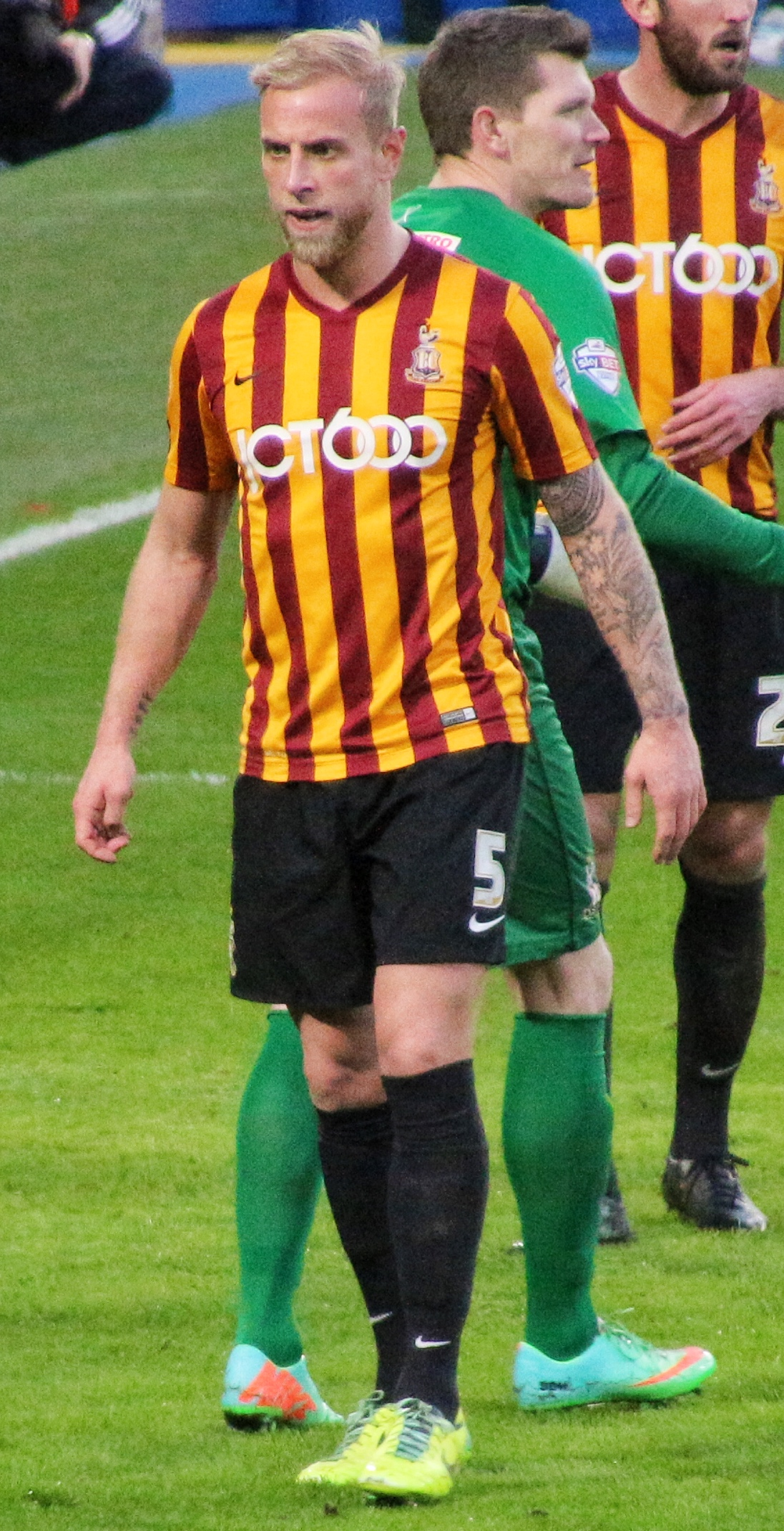
Andrew Davies was named Southampton F.C. Player of the Season in 2008.

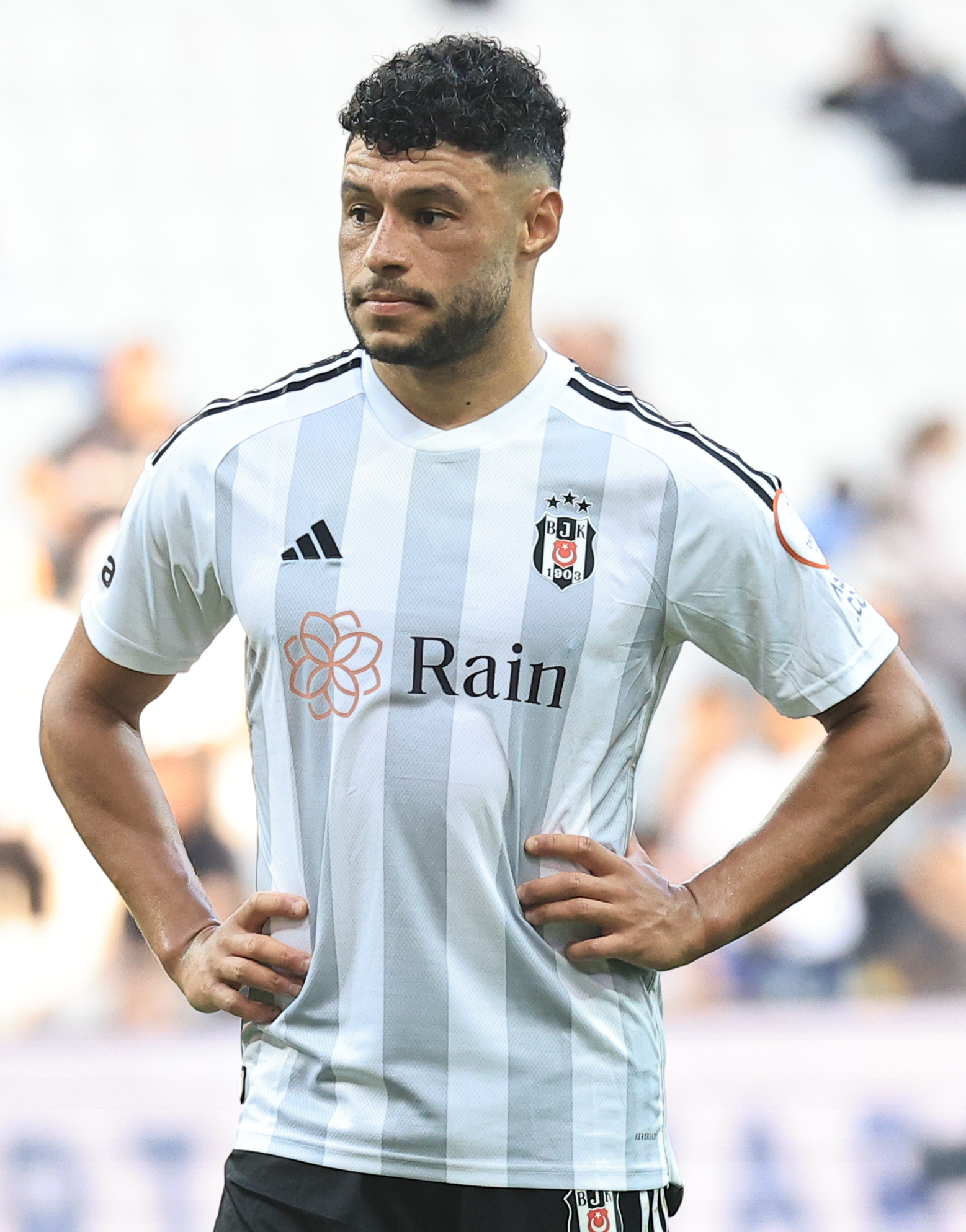
Alex Oxlade-Chamberlain played 42 games for Southampton (2010–2011).

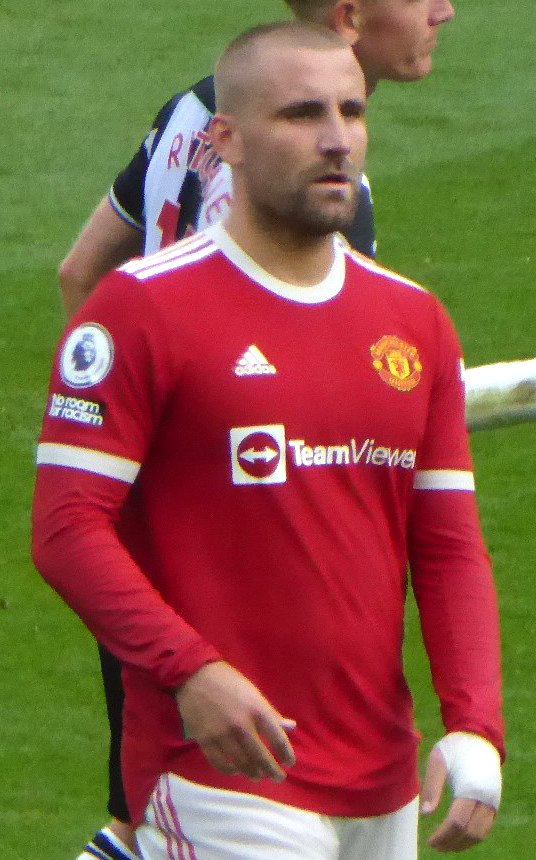
Luke Shaw made his debut for Southampton aged 16.

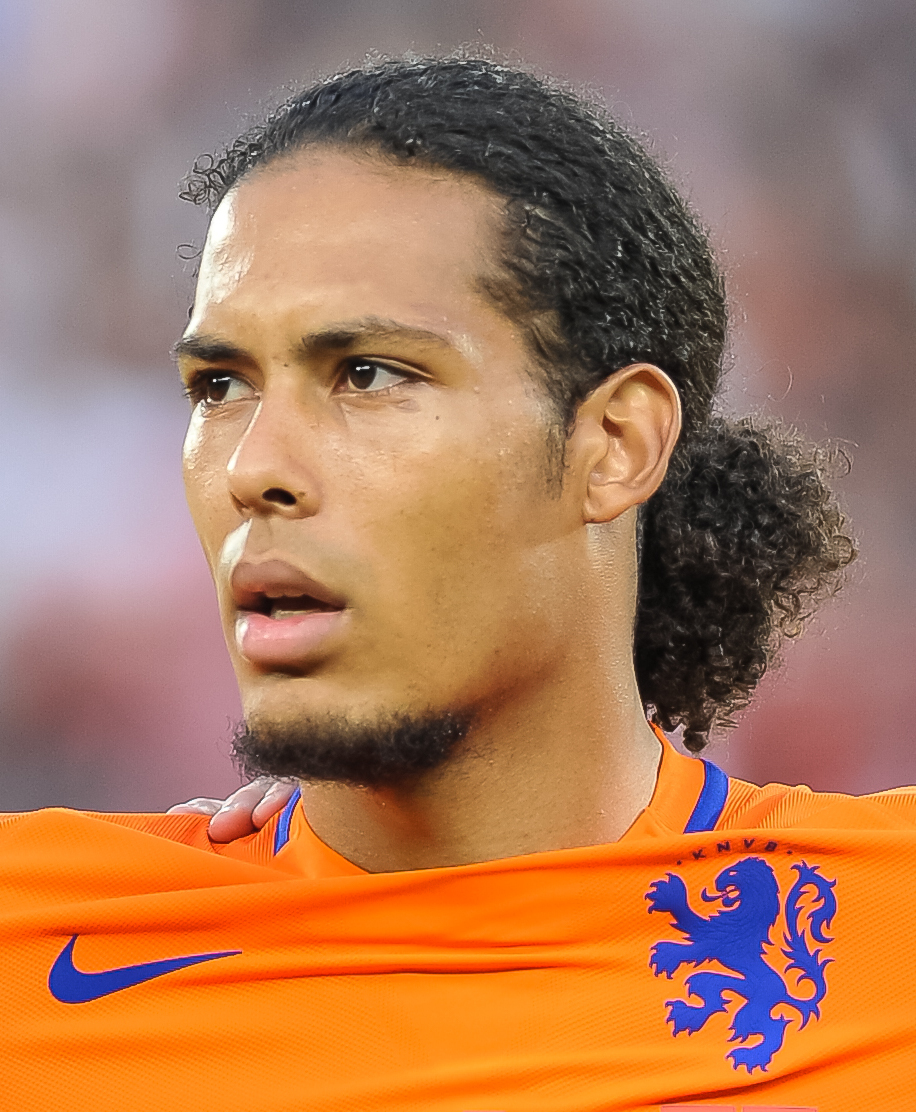
Virgil van Dijk played 80 games for Southampton (2015–2017).

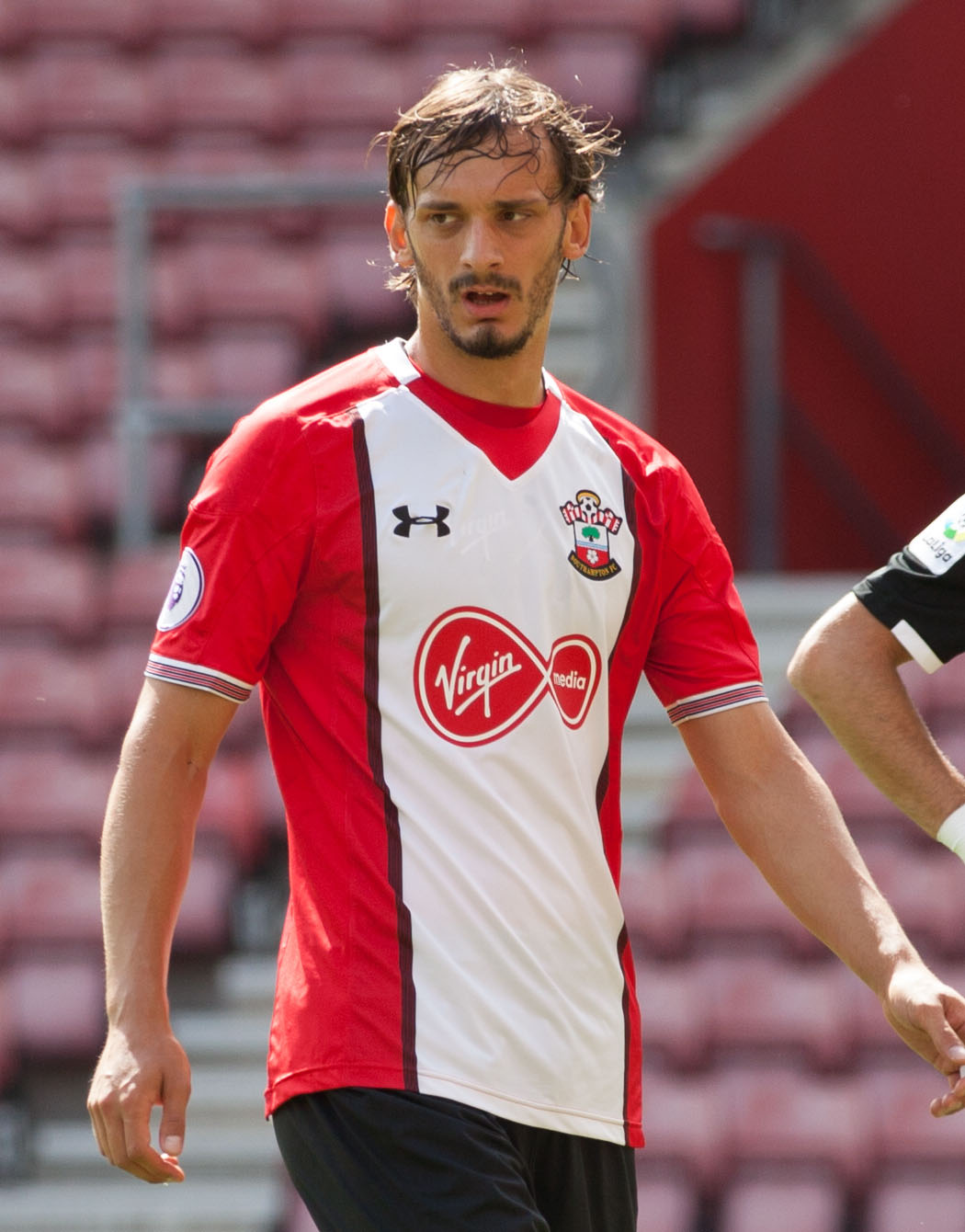
Manolo Gabbiadini scored twice in Southampton's EFL Cup Final defeat to Manchester United.

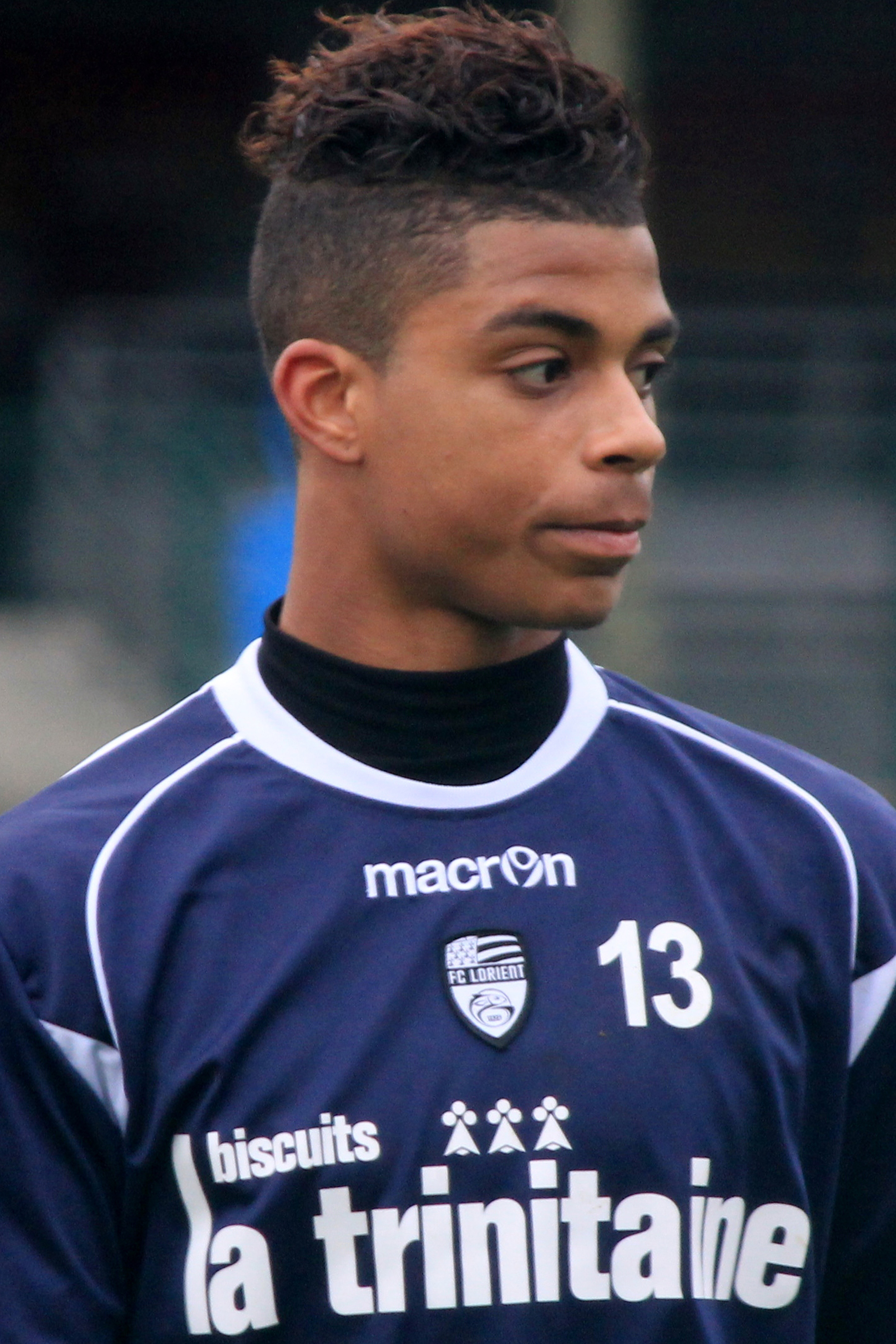
Mario Lemina made 52 appearances for Southampton between 2017 and 2019.

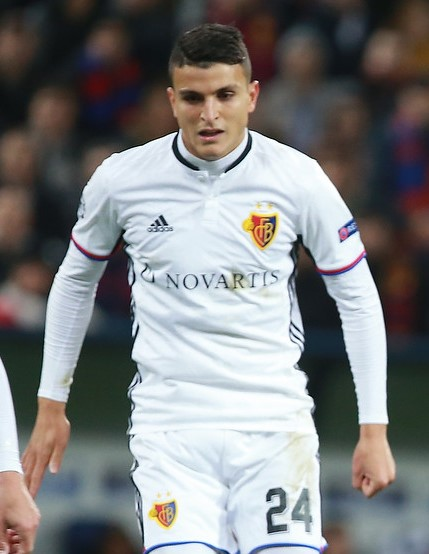
Mohamed Elyounoussi made 90 appearances for Southampton (2018–2023).

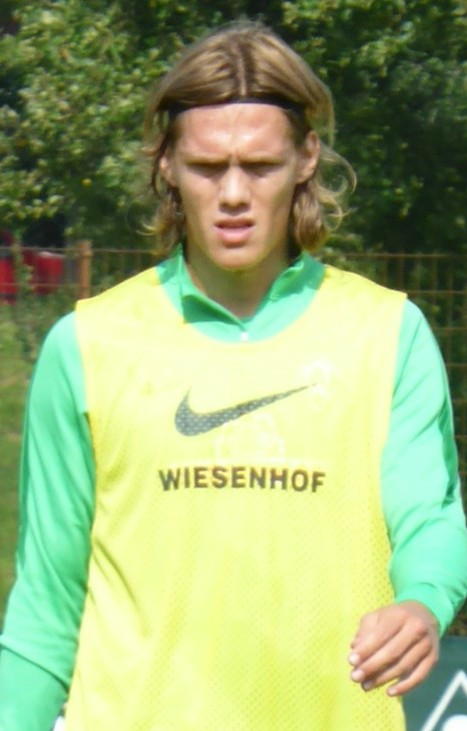
Jannik Vestergaard joined Southampton from Borussia Mönchengladbach in July 2018.

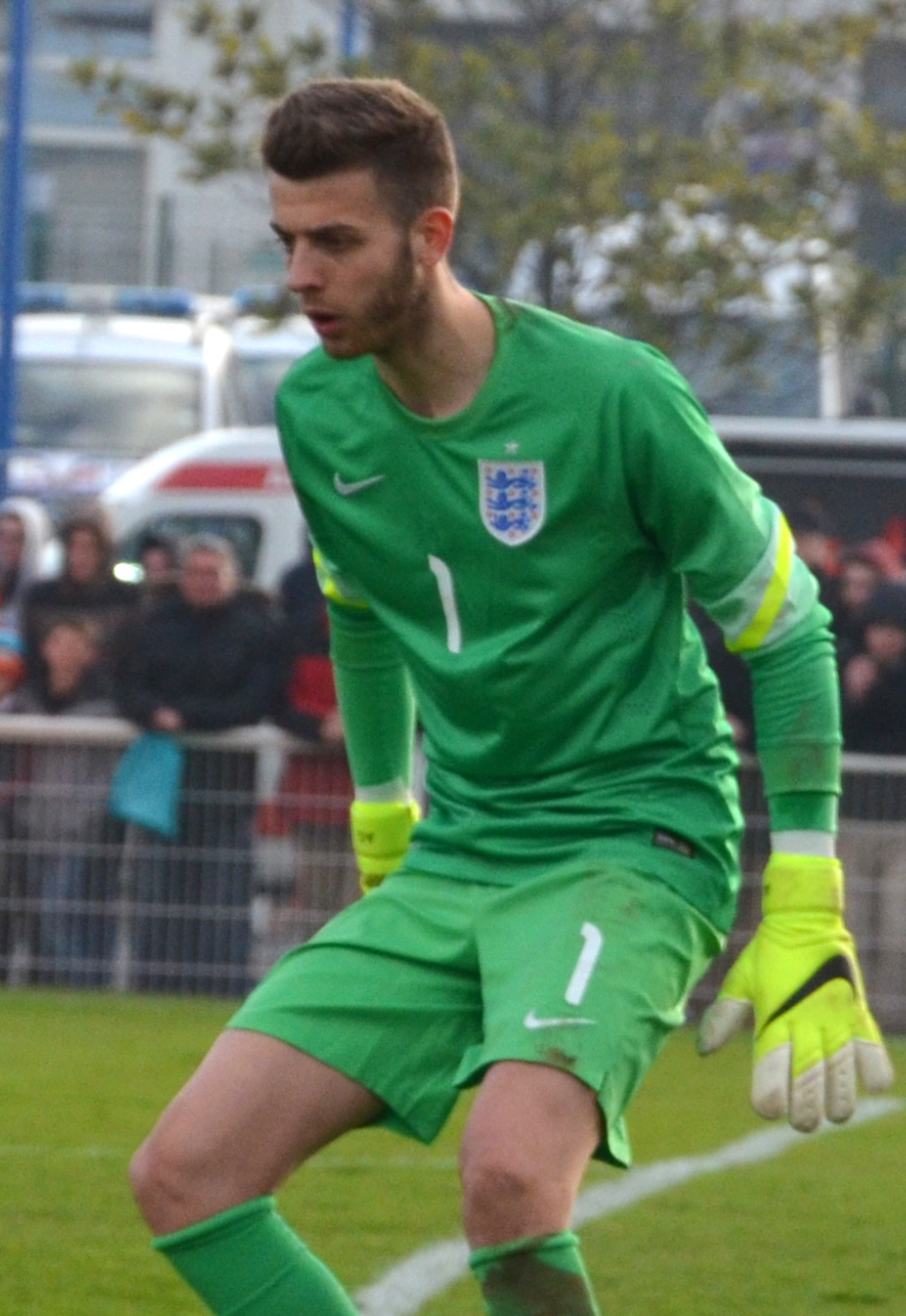
Angus Gunn played 30 times for Southampton.

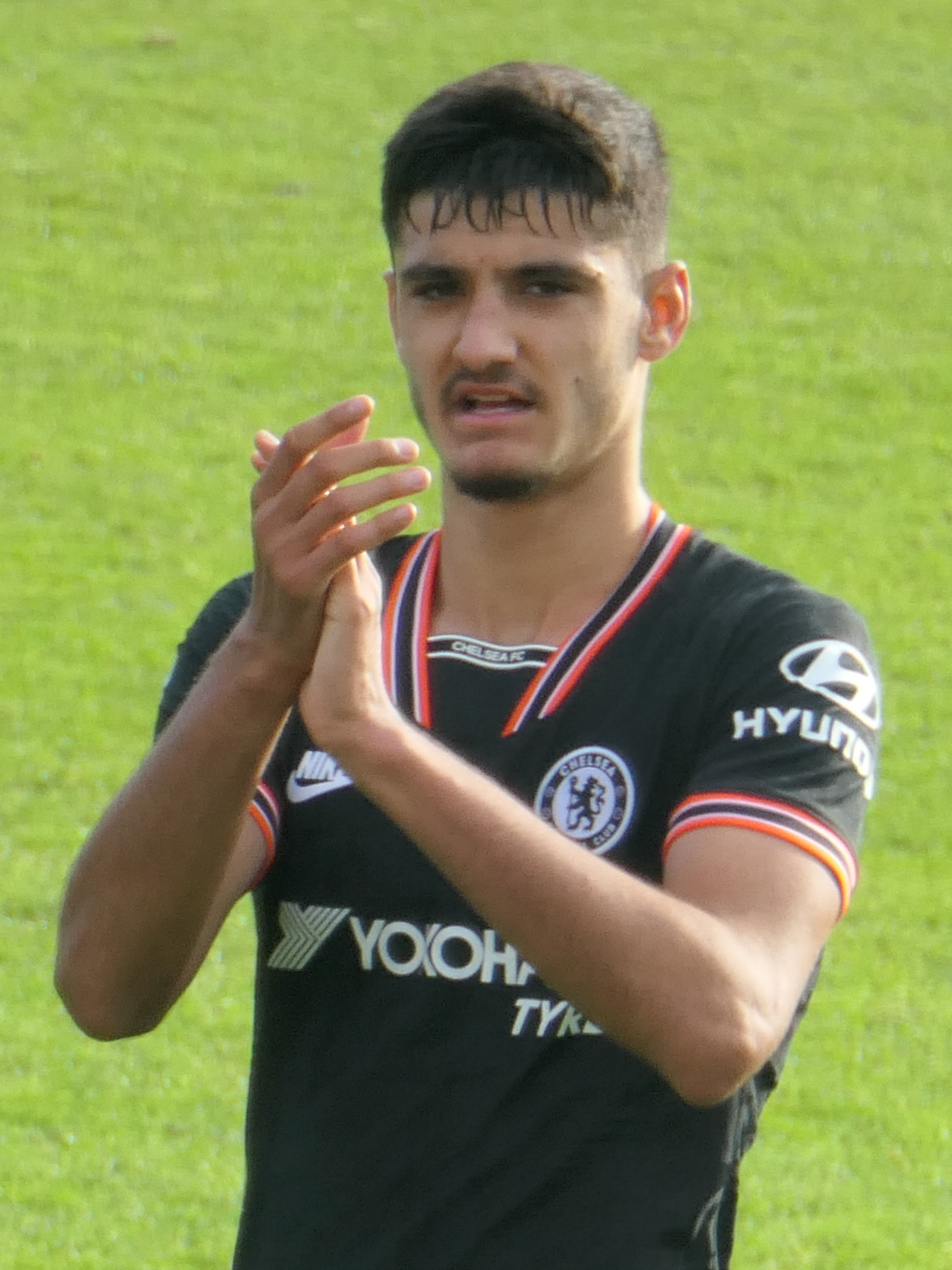
Armando Broja joined Southampton on loan from Chelsea in 2021.

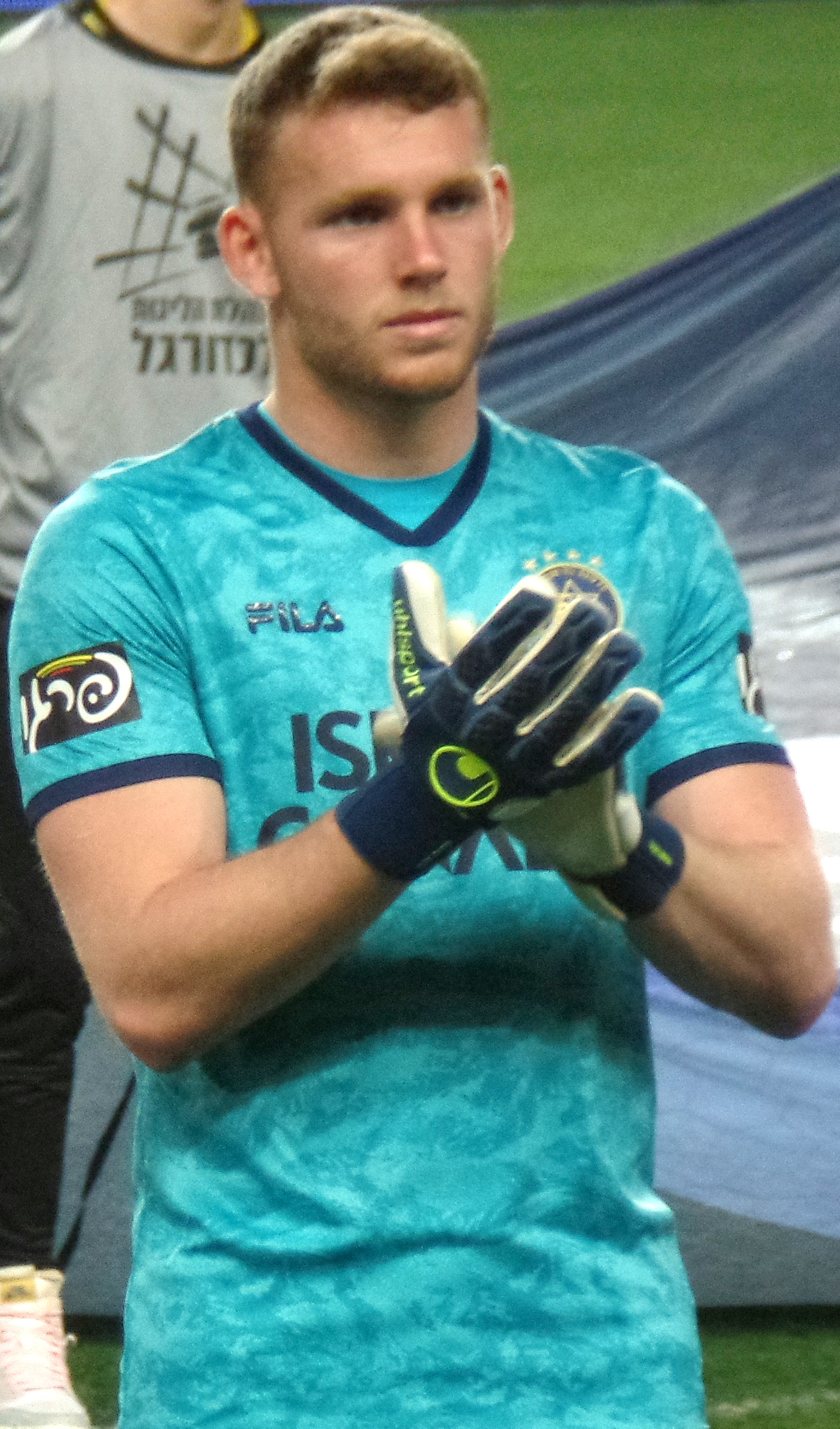
Daniel Peretz joined Southampton on loan from Bayern Munich in January 2026.

List of Southampton F.C. players with between 25 and 99 appearances
| Player | Nationality | Pos | Club career | Starts | Subs | Total | Goals |
| Player | Nationality | Pos | Club career | Appearances | | | Goals |
|---|---|---|---|---|---|---|---|
| George Carter | England | FB | 1887–1893 | 36 | —N/a | 36 | 2 |
| Ralph Ruffell | England | GK | 1887–1894 | 41 | —N/a | 41 | 0 |
| Arthur Farwell | England | FW | 1888–1893 | 25 | —N/a | 25 | 8 |
| William Stride | England | HB | 1888–1894 | 33 | —N/a | 33 | 0 |
| George Verney | England | HB | 1889–1894 | 41 | —N/a | 41 | 4 |
| George Marshall | Scotland | HB | 1891–1895 | 62 | 1 | 63 | 2 |
| Ernie Taylor | England | HB | 1893–1898 | 42 | —N/a | 42 | 5 |
| Jack Angus | Scotland | FW | 1893–1895 | 36 | —N/a | 36 | 21 |
| Herbert Ward | England | FW | 1893–1895 | 25 | —N/a | 25 | 16 |
| Harry Offer | England | FW | 1893–1895 | 31 | —N/a | 31 | 14 |
| Lachie Thomson | England | FB | 1894–1896 | 44 | —N/a | 44 | 4 |
| Charles Baker | England | FW | 1894–1896 | 46 | —N/a | 46 | 17 |
| Alf Littlehales | England | HB | 1894–1898 | 71 | —N/a | 71 | 13 |
| Willie Naughton | Scotland | FW | 1895–1898 | 47 | —N/a | 47 | 21 |
| John Hodgkinson | England | HB | 1896–1897 | 28 | —N/a | 28 | 4 |
| William McMillan | Scotland | HB | 1896–1898 | 47 | —N/a | 47 | 3 |
| Robert Buchanan | Scotland | FW | 1896–1899 | 74 | —N/a | 74 | 40 |
| Bob Brown | England | FW | 1897–1898 | 25 | —N/a | 25 | 4 |
| Bob Petrie | Scotland | HB | 1897–1900 | 99 | —N/a | 99 | 6 |
| Tom Nicol | Scotland | FB | 1897–1899 | 58 | —N/a | 58 | 4 |
| David Steven | Scotland | FW | 1898–1899 | 30 | —N/a | 30 | 8 |
| Abe Hartley | Scotland | FW | 1898–1899 | 43 | —N/a | 43 | 41 |
| John Tait Robertson | Scotland | HB | 1898–1899 | 37 | —N/a | 37 | 6 |
| Peter Durber | England | FB | 1898–1900 | 82 | —N/a | 82 | 0 |
| Peter Meechan | Scotland | FB | 1898–1900 | 73 | —N/a | 73 | 1 |
| Roddy McLeod | Scotland | FW | 1899–1900 | 34 | —N/a | 34 | 12 |
| Alf Milward | England | FW | 1899–1901 | 87 | —N/a | 87 | 44 |
| Harry Turner | England | FW | 1900; 1903–1905 | 34 | —N/a | 34 | 6 |
| Edgar Chadwick | England | FW | 1900–1902 | 87 | —N/a | 87 | 31 |
| Bertram Sharp | England | FB | 1900–1901 | 32 | —N/a | 32 | 1 |
| Wilf Toman | England | FW | 1900–1901 | 29 | —N/a | 29 | 10 |
| Bert Paddington | England | HB | 1900–1903 | 29 | —N/a | 29 | 0 |
| Harry Moger | England | GK | 1900–1903 | 27 | —N/a | 27 | 0 |
| C. B. Fry | England | FB | 1900–1902 | 29 | —N/a | 29 | 0 |
| Albert Brown | England | FW | 1901–1902 | 46 | —N/a | 46 | 35 |
| Bill Henderson | Scotland | FB | 1901–1902 | 33 | —N/a | 33 | 0 |
| Tom Barlow | England | FW | 1902–1903 | 35 | —N/a | 35 | 13 |
| Dick Evans | England | FW | 1902–1904 | 61 | —N/a | 61 | 22 |
| Thomas Robertson | Scotland | FB | 1902–1904 | 76 | —N/a | 76 | 1 |
| Kelly Houlker | England | HB | 1903–1906 | 98 | —N/a | 98 | 4 |
| Bert Dainty | England | HB | 1904–1905 | 46 | —N/a | 46 | 4 |
| Charles Webb | England | FW | 1904–1905 | 26 | —N/a | 26 | 5 |
| Edgar Bluff | England | FW | 1904–1905 | 39 | —N/a | 39 | 18 |
| Bob Benson | England | FB | 1904–1905 | 32 | —N/a | 32 | 0 |
| Bill Clarke | England | FB | 1905–1907 | 79 | —N/a | 79 | 0 |
| George Harris | England | FW | 1905–1907 | 72 | —N/a | 72 | 18 |
| Isaac Tomlinson | England | FW | 1905–1906 | 52 | —N/a | 52 | 13 |
| Jack Warner | England | FB | 1905–1906 | 26 | —N/a | 26 | 0 |
| Jimmy Soye | Scotland | FW | 1905–1906 | 35 | —N/a | 35 | 14 |
| Arthur Hartshorne | England | FB | 1905–1906 | 50 | —N/a | 50 | 0 |
| Jack Hogg | England | HB | 1905–1907 | 74 | —N/a | 74 | 2 |
| James Bowden | England | HB | 1906–1907 | 42 | —N/a | 42 | 0 |
| Alex Glen | Scotland | FW | 1906–1907 | 41 | —N/a | 41 | 16 |
| Bill Gray | Scotland | HB | 1906–1907 | 41 | —N/a | 41 | 0 |
| Bert Hoskins | England | FW | 1906–1908 | 31 | —N/a | 31 | 5 |
| Sam Jepp | England | HB | 1907–1911 | 94 | —N/a | 94 | 3 |
| Frank Thorpe | England | HB | 1907–1909 | 93 | —N/a | 93 | 5 |
| Harry Hadley | England | HB | 1907–1908 | 37 | —N/a | 37 | 0 |
| John Lewis | Wales | FW | 1907–1908 | 34 | —N/a | 34 | 12 |
| Bert Hodgkinson | Wales | FW | 1907–1909 | 89 | —N/a | 89 | 24 |
| Frank Costello | England | FW | 1907–1909 | 62 | —N/a | 62 | 19 |
| George Smith | England | FW | 1907–1908 | 39 | —N/a | 39 | 8 |
| Arthur Hughes | England | FW | 1908–1909 | 28 | —N/a | 28 | 18 |
| Sam Shearer | Scotland | FW | 1908–1910 | 25 | —N/a | 25 | 0 |
| Frank Jordan | England | FW | 1908–1910 | 56 | —N/a | 56 | 10 |
| Robert Carter | England | FW | 1909–1910 | 45 | —N/a | 45 | 14 |
| Charlie McGibbon | England | FW | 1909–1910 | 32 | —N/a | 32 | 24 |
| Martin Dunne | England | FW | 1910–1911 | 33 | —N/a | 33 | 10 |
| Arthur Brown | England | GK | 1910–1912 | 43 | —N/a | 43 | 0 |
| Billy Beaumont | England | HB | 1910–1911 | 29 | —N/a | 29 | 0 |
| Henry Hamilton | England | FW | 1911–1912 | 27 | —N/a | 27 | 11 |
| George Handley | England | FW | 1911–1912 | 26 | —N/a | 26 | 2 |
| Jack Wilcox | England | FW | 1911–1912 | 31 | —N/a | 31 | 7 |
| Archie Small | England | FW | 1911–1913 | 27 | —N/a | 27 | 4 |
| William Knight | England | GK | 1911–1913 | 51 | —N/a | 51 | 0 |
| Arthur Coates | England | FB | 1912–1913 | 34 | —N/a | 34 | 0 |
| Fred Taylor | England | FW | 1912–1913 | 30 | —N/a | 30 | 6 |
| Ted Salway | England | HB | 1912–1914 | 32 | —N/a | 32 | 1 |
| Fred Turnbull | England | FW | 1912–1913 | 36 | —N/a | 36 | 5 |
| George Kitchen | England | GK | 1912–1914 | 53 | —N/a | 53 | 0 |
| Len Butt | England | HB | 1913; 1919–1922 | 26 | —N/a | 26 | 0 |
| Richard Brooks | England | FB | 1913–1914 | 37 | —N/a | 37 | 0 |
| George Hadley | England | HB | 1913–1915 | 73 | —N/a | 73 | 4 |
| Jack Small | England | HB | 1913–1915 | 67 | —N/a | 67 | 5 |
| Bill Smith | England | FW | 1913–1914 | 32 | —N/a | 32 | 7 |
| Ernie Steventon | England | GK | 1913–1915 | 60 | —N/a | 60 | 0 |
| Arthur Wood | England | GK | 1914–1920 | 50 | —N/a | 50 | 0 |
| Charles Curtin | England | FW | 1914–1915 | 34 | —N/a | 34 | 5 |
| Fred Jones | England | FW | 1914–1915 | 37 | —N/a | 37 | 14 |
| Reg Hackett | England | HB | 1919–1920 | 31 | —N/a | 31 | 0 |
| James Moore | England | FW | 1919–1921 | 89 | —N/a | 89 | 22 |
| George Bradburn | England | HB | 1919–1922 | 37 | —N/a | 37 | 0 |
| Charlie Brown | England | FW | 1920–1924 | 96 | —N/a | 96 | 6 |
| Henry Johnson | England | FW | 1921–1924 | 44 | —N/a | 44 | 11 |
| Jack Elkes | England | FW | 1922–1923 | 42 | —N/a | 42 | 8 |
| George Getgood | Scotland | HB | 1922–1923 | 36 | —N/a | 36 | 1 |
| Jimmy Carr | Scotland | FW | 1923–1926 | 98 | —N/a | 98 | 10 |
| Cliff Price | England | FW | 1923–1925 | 67 | —N/a | 67 | 18 |
| Jimmy Bullock | England | FW | 1924–1928 | 37 | —N/a | 37 | 14 |
| Stan Cribb | England | FW | 1925–1930 | 78 | —N/a | 78 | 22 |
| Cuthbert Coundon | England | FW | 1925–1928 | 27 | —N/a | 27 | 3 |
| Billy Murphy | England | FW | 1926–1929 | 83 | —N/a | 83 | 9 |
| Sam Taylor | England | FW | 1926–1928 | 76 | —N/a | 76 | 17 |
| Jerry Mackie | Scotland | FW | 1928–1931 | 84 | —N/a | 84 | 24 |
| Willie Haines | England | FW | 1928–1932 | 71 | —N/a | 71 | 47 |
| Bert Jepson | England | FW | 1928–1932 | 97 | —N/a | 97 | 19 |
| Bobby Weale | Wales | FW | 1928–1930 | 48 | —N/a | 48 | 10 |
| Peter Dougall | Scotland | FW | 1929–1932 | 29 | —N/a | 29 | 5 |
| Bill Fraser | England | FW | 1929–1932 | 58 | —N/a | 58 | 11 |
| Arthur Wilson | England | HB | 1929–1932 | 66 | —N/a | 66 | 12 |
| Frank Campbell | Scotland | HB | 1931–1934 | 93 | —N/a | 93 | 3 |
| Ted Drake | England | FW | 1931–1934 | 78 | —N/a | 78 | 49 |
| Tom Ruddy | England | FW | 1932–1934 | 28 | —N/a | 28 | 3 |
| Frank Ward | England | FB | 1933–1934 | 28 | —N/a | 28 | 0 |
| Laurie Fishlock | England | FW | 1933–1936 | 72 | —N/a | 72 | 16 |
| Norman Cole | England | FW | 1933–1935 | 36 | —N/a | 36 | 13 |
| Billy Light | England | GK | 1934–1936 | 49 | —N/a | 49 | 0 |
| Cyril King | England | HB | 1934–1938 | 99 | —N/a | 99 | 2 |
| Vic Watson | England | FW | 1935–1936 | 39 | —N/a | 39 | 15 |
| Doug Henderson | England | HB | 1936–1938 | 25 | —N/a | 25 | 0 |
| Jimmy Dunne | Ireland | FB | 1936–1937 | 37 | —N/a | 37 | 14 |
| Billy Kingdon | England | HB | 1936–1938 | 49 | —N/a | 49 | 1 |
| Fred Smallwood | Wales | FW | 1936–1938 | 49 | —N/a | 49 | 10 |
| Bill Kennedy | Scotland | HB | 1936–1938 | 43 | —N/a | 43 | 0 |
| John Summers | England | FW | 1936–1937 | 32 | —N/a | 32 | 8 |
| Donovan Browning | England | FB | 1936–1938 | 26 | —N/a | 26 | 0 |
| Harry Osman | England | FW | 1937–1939 | 71 | —N/a | 71 | 31 |
| Sam Warhurst | England | GK | 1937–1939 | 83 | —N/a | 83 | 0 |
| Billy Bevis | England | FW | 1937–1947 | 89 | —N/a | 89 | 19 |
| David Affleck | Scotland | HB | 1937–1939 | 64 | —N/a | 64 | 0 |
| Ray Parkin | England | HB | 1937–1939 | 60 | —N/a | 60 | 10 |
| Frank Hill | Scotland | HB | 1937–1939 | 53 | —N/a | 53 | 3 |
| Len Stansbridge | England | GK | 1938–1951 | 52 | —N/a | 52 | 0 |
| Harry Brophy | England | HB | 1938–1939 | 39 | —N/a | 39 | 5 |
| Reg Tomlinson | England | FW | 1938–1939 | 39 | —N/a | 39 | 13 |
| Fred Briggs | England | FW | 1938–1939 | 40 | —N/a | 40 | 15 |
| Tom Emanuel | Wales | FB | 1938–1946 | 38 | —N/a | 38 | 0 |
| Jack Bradley | England | FW | 1946–1947 | 55 | —N/a | 55 | 25 |
| Bill Stroud | England | HB | 1946–1947 | 35 | —N/a | 35 | 4 |
| Bobby Veck | England | FW | 1946–1950 | 27 | —N/a | 27 | 3 |
| George Ephgrave | England | GK | 1946–1947 | 38 | —N/a | 38 | 0 |
| George Lewis | Wales | FW | 1946–1948 | 45 | —N/a | 45 | 15 |
| Wilf Grant | England | FW | 1946–1949 | 64 | —N/a | 64 | 12 |
| Alf Ramsey | England | FB | 1946–1949 | 96 | —N/a | 96 | 8 |
| Jack Gregory | England | FB | 1947–1954 | 68 | —N/a | 68 | 0 |
| Augie Scott | England | FW | 1947–1950 | 48 | —N/a | 48 | 10 |
| Ted Ballard | England | FB | 1948–1951 | 48 | —N/a | 48 | 0 |
| Jack Edwards | England | FW | 1949–1952 | 85 | —N/a | 85 | 16 |
| Ernie Jones | Wales | FW | 1949–1951 | 45 | —N/a | 45 | 4 |
| Tom Lowder | England | FW | 1949–1953 | 39 | —N/a | 39 | 2 |
| Jimmy McGowan | Scotland | FW | 1950–1958 | 83 | —N/a | 83 | 9 |
| Hugh Kelly | Ireland | GK | 1950–1951 | 30 | —N/a | 30 | 0 |
| Eddy Brown | England | FW | 1950–1952 | 59 | —N/a | 59 | 34 |
| Frank Dudley | England | FW | 1951–1953 | 73 | —N/a | 73 | 33 |
| Walter Judd | England | FW | 1951–1952 | 35 | —N/a | 35 | 13 |
| Henry Horton | England | HB | 1951–1954 | 80 | —N/a | 80 | 12 |
| Charlie Purves | England | FW | 1951–1954 | 36 | —N/a | 36 | 4 |
| Peter Sillett | England | FB | 1951–1953 | 65 | —N/a | 65 | 4 |
| Alex Simpson | Scotland | HB | 1952–1955 | 75 | —N/a | 75 | 1 |
| Roy Williams | England | FW | 1952–1955 | 43 | —N/a | 43 | 7 |
| Jimmy Shields | Northern Ireland | FW | 1956–1958 | 43 | —N/a | 43 | 22 |
| Ken Birch | England | HB | 1958–1959 | 37 | —N/a | 37 | 3 |
| Charlie Livesey | England | FW | 1958–1959 | 29 | —N/a | 29 | 15 |
| Terry Simpson | England | HB | 1958–1962 | 27 | —N/a | 27 | 2 |
| Dick Conner | England | HB | 1959–1961 | 95 | —N/a | 95 | 2 |
| Bob Charles | England | GK | 1959–1960 | 35 | —N/a | 35 | 0 |
| Harry Penk | England | FW | 1960–1963 | 60 | —N/a | 60 | 7 |
| Roy Patrick | England | DF | 1961–1962 | 33 | —N/a | 33 | 0 |
| David Chadwick | India | MF | 1961–1966 | 26 | 0 | 26 | 1 |
| Ian White | Scotland | HB | 1962–1966 | 63 | 1 | 64 | 5 |
| George Kirby | England | FW | 1962–1964 | 73 | —N/a | 73 | 31 |
| David Burnside | England | MF | 1962–1964 | 70 | —N/a | 70 | 26 |
| John McGuigan | Scotland | FW | 1963–1965 | 35 | —N/a | 35 | 8 |
| John Hollowbread | England | GK | 1964–1965 | 40 | —N/a | 40 | 0 |
| Ken Jones | England | DF | 1965–1970 | 92 | 0 | 92 | 0 |
| Fred Kemp | Italy | MF | 1965–1970 | 68 | 4 | 72 | 11 |
| Campbell Forsyth | Scotland | GK | 1965–1968 | 51 | 0 | 51 | 0 |
| David Webb | England | DF | 1966–1968 | 86 | 0 | 86 | 2 |
| Dave MacLaren | Scotland | GK | 1966–1967 | 26 | 0 | 26 | 0 |
| Dave Thompson | England | MF | 1966–1970 | 24 | 3 | 27 | 0 |
| Gerry Gurr | England | GK | 1967–1969 | 49 | 0 | 49 | 0 |
| Frank Saul | England | FW | 1968–1970 | 61 | 7 | 68 | 12 |
| Tommy Jenkins | England | FW | 1969–1972 | 95 | 1 | 96 | 6 |
| Gerry O'Brien | Scotland | MF | 1970–1976 | 77 | 19 | 96 | 3 |
| Roger Fry | England | DF | 1971–1972 | 26 | 0 | 26 | 0 |
| Steve Mills | England | DF | 1972–1976 | 77 | 4 | 81 | 0 |
| Steve Middleton | England | GK | 1973–1976 | 29 | 1 | 30 | 0 |
| Jim McCalliog | Scotland | MF | 1975–1977 | 88 | 2 | 90 | 12 |
| Peter Rodrigues | Wales | DF | 1975–1977 | 75 | 0 | 75 | 3 |
| Austin Hayes | Republic of Ireland | MF | 1976–1980 | 29 | 12 | 41 | 9 |
| Mick Pickering | England | DF | 1977–1978 | 51 | 0 | 51 | 0 |
| Terry Curran | England | MF | 1978–1979 | 38 | 1 | 39 | 1 |
| Terry Gennoe | England | GK | 1978–1979 | 51 | 0 | 51 | 0 |
| Charlie George | England | FW | 1979–1981 | 52 | 0 | 52 | 14 |
| David Watson | England | DF | 1979–1981 | 83 | 0 | 83 | 8 |
| Ivan Katalinić | Yugoslavia | GK | 1980–1982 | 54 | 0 | 54 | 0 |
| Kevin Keegan | England | MF | 1980–1982 | 80 | 0 | 80 | 42 |
| Mark Whitlock | England | DF | 1981–1986 | 65 | 6 | 71 | 2 |
| Keith Cassells | England | FW | 1982–1983 | 21 | 6 | 27 | 5 |
| Dennis Rofe | England | DF | 1982–1984 | 25 | 2 | 27 | 0 |
| Ken Armstrong | England | DF | 1983–1984 | 28 | 0 | 28 | 0 |
| Frank Worthington | England | FW | 1983–1984 | 42 | 0 | 42 | 4 |
| Alan Curtis | Wales | FW | 1983–1985 | 61 | 7 | 68 | 7 |
| Joe Jordan | Scotland | FW | 1984–1986 | 63 | 1 | 64 | 17 |
| Mark Blake | England | DF | 1986–1989 | 24 | 2 | 26 | 2 |
| Jon Gittens | England | DF | 1986–1987; 1990–1992 | 44 | 3 | 47 | 0 |
| Craig Maskell | England | FW | 1986–1987; 1993–1996 | 11 | 15 | 26 | 2 |
| Colin Clarke | Northern Ireland | FW | 1986–1988 | 98 | 0 | 98 | 39 |
| Gordon Hobson | England | FW | 1986–1988 | 38 | 1 | 39 | 9 |
| Derek Statham | England | DF | 1987–1989 | 78 | 0 | 78 | 4 |
| John Burridge | England | GK | 1987–1989 | 75 | 0 | 75 | 0 |
| Paul Rideout | England | FW | 1988–1991 | 87 | 9 | 96 | 21 |
| Ray Wallace | England | DF | 1988–1989 | 44 | 2 | 46 | 0 |
| Oleksiy Cherednyk | Soviet Union | DF | 1990–1991 | 23 | 4 | 27 | 0 |
| Nicky Banger | England | FW | 1990–1994 | 21 | 41 | 62 | 11 |
| Alan McLoughlin | Republic of Ireland | MF | 1990–1992 | 27 | 3 | 30 | 1 |
| Terry Hurlock | England | MF | 1991–1993 | 77 | 2 | 79 | 1 |
| Steve Wood | England | DF | 1991–1994 | 54 | 1 | 55 | 1 |
| Tommy Widdrington | England | MF | 1992–1996 | 81 | 9 | 90 | 3 |
| Paul Allen | England | MF | 1993–1994 | 46 | 3 | 49 | 1 |
| Neil Heaney | England | MF | 1994–1996 | 52 | 21 | 73 | 7 |
| Bruce Grobbelaar | Zimbabwe | GK | 1994–1996 | 45 | 0 | 45 | 0 |
| David Hughes | Wales | MF | 1994–1999 | 25 | 39 | 64 | 3 |
| Neil Shipperley | England | FW | 1995–1996 | 81 | 2 | 83 | 20 |
| Gordon Watson | England | FW | 1995–1997 | 48 | 19 | 67 | 14 |
| Alan Neilson | Wales | DF | 1995–1997 | 50 | 13 | 63 | 0 |
| Barry Venison | England | DF | 1995–1996 | 28 | 1 | 29 | 0 |
| Richard Dryden | England | DF | 1996–2000 | 51 | 3 | 54 | 4 |
| Neil Moss | England | GK | 1996–2002 | 24 | 2 | 26 | 0 |
| Robbie Slater | Australia | MF | 1996–1998 | 31 | 19 | 50 | 2 |
| Eyal Berkovic | Israel | MF | 1996–1997 | 32 | 3 | 35 | 6 |
| Ulrich van Gobbel | Netherlands | DF | 1996–1997 | 32 | 2 | 34 | 2 |
| Mickey Evans | England | FW | 1997 | 16 | 9 | 25 | 5 |
| Andy Williams | Wales | DF | 1997–1998 | 4 | 21 | 25 | 0 |
| Kevin Richardson | England | MF | 1997–1998 | 30 | 3 | 33 | 0 |
| Carlton Palmer | England | MF | 1997–1999 | 51 | 1 | 52 | 3 |
| David Hirst | England | FW | 1997–1999 | 30 | 2 | 32 | 9 |
| Scott Hiley | England | DF | 1998–1999 | 31 | 2 | 33 | 0 |
| Mark Hughes | Wales | FW | 1998–2000 | 57 | 3 | 60 | 2 |
| Stuart Ripley | England | MF | 1998–2001 | 42 | 19 | 61 | 1 |
| Hassan Kachloul | Morocco | MF | 1998–2001 | 82 | 14 | 96 | 15 |
| Patrick Colleter | France | DF | 1998–2000 | 26 | 0 | 26 | 1 |
| Dean Richards | England | DF | 1999–2001 | 78 | 1 | 79 | 7 |
| Trond Egil Soltvedt | Norway | MF | 1999–2001 | 28 | 11 | 39 | 5 |
| Tahar El Khalej | Morocco | DF | 2000–2002 | 51 | 14 | 65 | 4 |
| Mark Draper | England | MF | 2000–2001 | 21 | 9 | 30 | 1 |
| Uwe Rösler | East Germany | FW | 2000–2001 | 10 | 19 | 29 | 1 |
| Paul Williams | England | DF | 2001–2003 | 40 | 2 | 42 | 0 |
| Michael Svensson | Sweden | DF | 2002–2008 | 86 | 1 | 87 | 6 |
| David Prutton | England | MF | 2003–2007 | 75 | 19 | 94 | 5 |
| Chris Baird | Northern Ireland | DF | 2003–2007 | 73 | 6 | 79 | 3 |
| Graeme Le Saux | England | DF | 2003–2005 | 46 | 1 | 47 | 2 |
| Neil McCann | Scotland | MF | 2003–2005 | 25 | 25 | 50 | 1 |
| Kevin Phillips | England | FW | 2003–2005 | 57 | 16 | 73 | 26 |
| Darren Kenton | England | DF | 2003–2006 | 28 | 5 | 33 | 1 |
| Martin Cranie | England | DF | 2004–2007 | 17 | 8 | 25 | 0 |
| Peter Crouch | England | FW | 2004–2005 | 24 | 9 | 33 | 16 |
| Andreas Jakobsson | Sweden | DF | 2004–2005 | 29 | 4 | 33 | 2 |
| Dexter Blackstock | Antigua and Barbuda | FW | 2004–2006 | 20 | 16 | 36 | 9 |
| Kenwyne Jones | Trinidad and Tobago | FW | 2005–2007 | 51 | 29 | 80 | 22 |
| Nigel Quashie | Scotland | MF | 2005–2006 | 38 | 0 | 38 | 6 |
| Djamel Belmadi | Algeria | MF | 2005–2007 | 33 | 7 | 40 | 4 |
| Ricardo Fuller | Jamaica | FW | 2005–2006 | 22 | 11 | 33 | 9 |
| Darren Powell | England | DF | 2005–2008 | 48 | 1 | 49 | 2 |
| Theo Walcott | England | MF | 2005–2006; 2020–2023 | 53 | 29 | 82 | 10 |
| Nathan Dyer | England | MF | 2005–2008 | 41 | 25 | 66 | 3 |
| David McGoldrick | Republic of Ireland | FW | 2005–2009 | 55 | 20 | 75 | 15 |
| Bartosz Białkowski | Poland | GK | 2006–2012 | 41 | 1 | 42 | 0 |
| Simon Gillett | England | MF | 2006–2010 | 27 | 12 | 39 | 0 |
| Alexander Östlund | Sweden | DF | 2006–2008 | 40 | 9 | 49 | 0 |
| Richard Chaplow | England | MF | 2006; 2010–2013 | 63 | 17 | 80 | 10 |
| Grzegorz Rasiak | Poland | FW | 2006–2009 | 64 | 21 | 85 | 32 |
| Gareth Bale | Wales | MF | 2006–2007 | 45 | 0 | 45 | 5 |
| Iñigo Idiakez | Spain | MF | 2006–2008 | 27 | 11 | 39 | 2 |
| Pelé | Cape Verde | DF | 2006–2007 | 41 | 3 | 44 | 1 |
| Rudi Skácel | Czech Republic | MF | 2006–2009 | 78 | 10 | 88 | 6 |
| Jhon Viáfara | Colombia | MF | 2006–2008 | 66 | 17 | 83 | 5 |
| Chris Makin | England | DF | 2006–2008 | 29 | 3 | 32 | 0 |
| Mario Lička | Czech Republic | MF | 2006–2008 | 19 | 13 | 32 | 1 |
| Marek Saganowski | Poland | FW | 2007–2009 | 46 | 28 | 74 | 19 |
| Adam Hammill | England | MF | 2007–2008 | 14 | 14 | 28 | 0 |
| Youssef Safri | Morocco | MF | 2007–2008 | 39 | 0 | 39 | 0 |
| Wayne Thomas | England | DF | 2007–2010 | 52 | 7 | 59 | 2 |
| Jason Euell | Jamaica | FW | 2007–2009 | 52 | 13 | 65 | 5 |
| Stern John | Trinidad and Tobago | FW | 2007–2008 | 40 | 12 | 52 | 20 |
| Andrew Davies | England | DF | 2007–2008 | 24 | 1 | 25 | 0 |
| Chris Perry | England | DF | 2008–2010 | 66 | 4 | 70 | 2 |
| Lee Holmes | England | MF | 2008–2012 | 21 | 21 | 42 | 3 |
| Lloyd James | Wales | DF | 2008–2010 | 81 | 4 | 85 | 2 |
| Paul Wotton | England | DF | 2008–2010 | 41 | 29 | 70 | 0 |
| Joseph Mills | England | DF | 2008–2010 | 18 | 18 | 36 | 0 |
| Oscar Gobern | England | MF | 2008–2011 | 7 | 18 | 25 | 2 |
| Radhi Jaïdi | Tunisia | DF | 2009–2011 | 67 | 1 | 68 | 4 |
| Papa Waigo | Senegal | FW | 2009–2010 | 18 | 26 | 44 | 11 |
| Michail Antonio | Jamaica | FW | 2009–2010 | 22 | 17 | 39 | 7 |
| David Connolly | Republic of Ireland | FW | 2009–2012 | 36 | 30 | 66 | 17 |
| Danny Seaborne | England | DF | 2010–2011 | 24 | 5 | 29 | 0 |
| Lee Barnard | England | FW | 2010–2012 | 45 | 28 | 73 | 24 |
| Jason Puncheon | England | MF | 2010–2013 | 70 | 11 | 81 | 10 |
| Alex Oxlade-Chamberlain | England | MF | 2010–2011 | 30 | 12 | 42 | 10 |
| Aaron Martin | England | DF | 2010–2012 | 22 | 7 | 29 | 2 |
| Danny Butterfield | England | DF | 2010–2012 | 50 | 4 | 54 | 0 |
| Ryan Dickson | England | DF | 2010–2011 | 19 | 11 | 30 | 1 |
| Frazer Richardson | England | DF | 2010–2013 | 57 | 11 | 68 | 0 |
| Steve De Ridder | Belgium | MF | 2011–2013 | 12 | 32 | 44 | 4 |
| Danny Fox | Scotland | DF | 2011–2014 | 59 | 10 | 69 | 1 |
| Jos Hooiveld | Netherlands | DF | 2011–2015 | 74 | 3 | 77 | 9 |
| Luke Shaw | England | DF | 2012–2014 | 62 | 5 | 67 | 0 |
| Calum Chambers | England | DF | 2012–2014 | 20 | 5 | 25 | 0 |
| Gastón Ramírez | Uruguay | MF | 2012–2016 | 28 | 27 | 55 | 8 |
| Artur Boruc | Poland | GK | 2012–2014 | 50 | 0 | 50 | 0 |
| Dejan Lovren | Croatia | DF | 2013–2014 | 31 | 0 | 31 | 2 |
| Victor Wanyama | Kenya | MF | 2013–2016 | 86 | 11 | 97 | 4 |
| Harrison Reed | England | MF | 2013–2017 | 14 | 16 | 30 | 0 |
| Sam Gallagher | England | FW | 2013–2019 | 3 | 23 | 26 | 2 |
| Sam McQueen | England | DF | 2014–2018 | 14 | 15 | 29 | 0 |
| Graziano Pellè | Italy | FW | 2014–2016 | 71 | 9 | 80 | 30 |
| Matt Targett | England | DF | 2014–2019 | 54 | 9 | 63 | 1 |
| Toby Alderweireld | Belgium | DF | 2014–2015 | 26 | 2 | 28 | 1 |
| Sadio Mané | Senegal | FW | 2014–2016 | 62 | 13 | 75 | 25 |
| Jordy Clasie | Netherlands | MF | 2015–2017 | 43 | 7 | 49 | 2 |
| Maarten Stekelenburg | Netherlands | GK | 2015–2016 | 25 | 0 | 25 | 0 |
| Cuco Martina | Curaçao | DF | 2015–2017 | 29 | 7 | 36 | 1 |
| Virgil van Dijk | Netherlands | DF | 2015–2017 | 79 | 1 | 80 | 7 |
| Charlie Austin | England | FW | 2016–2019 | 40 | 41 | 81 | 21 |
| Sofiane Boufal | Morocco | MF | 2016–2020 | 41 | 43 | 84 | 5 |
| Josh Sims | England | MF | 2016–2019 | 8 | 19 | 27 | 0 |
| Manolo Gabbiadini | Italy | FW | 2017–2018 | 30 | 30 | 60 | 12 |
| Mario Lemina | Gabon | MF | 2017–2019 | 43 | 9 | 52 | 2 |
| Wesley Hoedt | Netherlands | DF | 2017–2018 | 45 | 0 | 45 | 1 |
| Michael Obafemi | Republic of Ireland | FW | 2018–2021 | 13 | 26 | 39 | 5 |
| Mohamed Elyounoussi | Norway | MF | 2018–2023 | 66 | 24 | 90 | 9 |
| Jannik Vestergaard | Denmark | DF | 2018–2021 | 75 | 4 | 79 | 4 |
| Angus Gunn | Scotland | GK | 2018–2020 | 30 | 0 | 30 | 0 |
| Yan Valery | Tunisia | DF | 2018–2022 | 45 | 8 | 53 | 2 |
| Moussa Djenepo | Mali | MF | 2019–2023 | 49 | 42 | 91 | 5 |
| Will Smallbone | Republic of Ireland | MF | 2020–2025 | 56 | 34 | 90 | 9 |
| Nathan Tella | Nigeria | MF | 2020–2023 | 25 | 19 | 44 | 3 |
| Ibrahima Diallo | France | MF | 2020–2023 | 45 | 36 | 81 | 1 |
| Mohammed Salisu | Ghana | DF | 2021–2023 | 72 | 8 | 80 | 1 |
| Tino Livramento | England | DF | 2021–2023 | 27 | 7 | 34 | 1 |
| Romain Perraud | France | DF | 2021–2023 | 48 | 12 | 60 | 5 |
| Armando Broja | Albania | FW | 2021–2022 | 24 | 14 | 38 | 9 |
| Lyanco | Brazil | FW | 2021–2023 | 33 | 16 | 49 | 1 |
| Gavin Bazunu | Republic of Ireland | GK | 2022–2026 | 97 | 0 | 97 | 0 |
| Roméo Lavia | Belgium | MF | 2022–2023 | 29 | 5 | 34 | 1 |
| Armel Bella-Kotchap | Germany | DF | 2022–2025 | 28 | 3 | 31 | 0 |
| Sékou Mara | France | FW | 2022–2024 | 19 | 45 | 64 | 8 |
| Samuel Edozie | England | MF | 2022– | 32 | 62 | 94 | 7 |
| Ainsley Maitland-Niles | England | MF | 2022–2023 | 16 | 10 | 26 | 0 |
| Carlos Alcaraz | Argentina | MF | 2023–2024 | 31 | 17 | 48 | 8 |
| James Bree | England | DF | 2023– | 77 | 14 | 91 | 7 |
| Paul Onuachu | Nigeria | FW | 2023–2025 | 15 | 25 | 40 | 4 |
| Kamaldeen Sulemana | Ghana | MF | 2023–2025 | 40 | 34 | 74 | 4 |
| Shea Charles | Northern Ireland | MF | 2023–2026 | 44 | 32 | 76 | 6 |
| Tyler Dibling | England | MF | 2023–2025 | 26 | 18 | 44 | 4 |
| Ryan Fraser | Scotland | MF | 2023–2025 | 32 | 40 | 72 | 9 |
| Ross Stewart | Scotland | FW | 2023–2026 | 19 | 31 | 50 | 12 |
| Cam Bragg | Scotland | MF | 2024– | 19 | 17 | 36 | 2 |
| Cameron Archer | England | FW | 2024– | 32 | 45 | 77 | 11 |
| Yukinari Sugawara | Japan | DF | 2024– | 19 | 16 | 35 | 1 |
| Mateus Fernades | Portugal | MF | 2024–2025 | 42 | 4 | 46 | 4 |
| Lesley Ugochukwu | France | MF | 2024–2025 | 23 | 8 | 31 | 1 |
| Nathan Wood | England | DF | 2024– | 55 | 13 | 68 | 1 |
| Aaron Ramsdale | England | GK | 2024– | 32 | 0 | 32 | 0 |
| Welington | Brazil | DF | 2025– | 25 | 15 | 40 | 2 |
| Jay Robinson | England | MF | 2025– | 9 | 23 | 32 | 2 |
| Kuryu Matsuki | Japan | MF | 2025– | 26 | 20 | 46 | 10 |
| Finn Azaz | Republic of Ireland | MF | 2025– | 56 | 9 | 65 | 14 |
| Tom Fellows | England | mf | 2025– | 37 | 17 | 54 | 1 |
| Caspar Jander | Germany | MF | 2025– | 39 | 7 | 46 | 2 |
| Léo Scienza | Brazil | MF | 2025– | 51 | 8 | 59 | 10 |
| Daniel Peretz | Israel | GK | 2026– | 44 | 0 | 44 | 0 |
| Cyle Larin | Canada | FW | 2026– | 23 | 13 | 36 | 18 |
