= Salway =

Salway is an English surname. Notable persons with this name include:

- Benet Salway, late 20th and early 21st century British historian
- Francis Salway (born 1957), British businessman
- Joseph Salway, early 19th century British artist and surveyor
- Peter Salway (born 1932), British historian
- Ted Salway (1891–1950), British footballer
