= Arthur Coates =

Arthur Coates may refer to:

- Arthur Coates (cricketer) (1848–1897), English cricketer who played for Gloucestershire
- Arthur Coates (footballer) (1882–1955), English footballer who played for Exeter City and Southampton in the 1910s
