= Roger Fry (disambiguation) =

Roger Fry was a painter and critic.

Roger Fry may also refer to:

- Roger Fry (educationist)
- Roger Fry (footballer)

== See also ==
- Roger Fry: A Biography
