= Charles Tyson =

English amateur footballer (1885–1964)

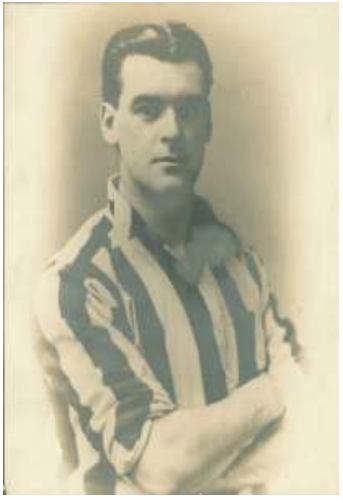

Personal information
- Full name: Charles Francis Tyson
- Date of birth: Spring 1885
- Place of birth: Liverpool, England
- Date of death: 31 October 1964 (aged 79)
- Place of death: Caterham, England
- Height: 6 ft 0 in (1.83 m)
- Position: Centre half

Youth career
- Crystal Palace

Senior career*
| Years | Team | Apps | (Gls) |
| 1908–1913 | Dulwich Hamlet | | |
| 1911–1913 | Southampton | 14 | (0) |

International career
| 1911 | England amateurs | 1 | (0) |
- * Club domestic league appearances and goals

Charles Francis Tyson (Spring 1885 – 31 October 1964) was an English amateur footballer who played at centre half for Southampton in the Southern League and for Dulwich Hamlet. He made one appearance for the England amateur side. By profession, he was a schoolteacher, spending most of his career at Alleyn's School situated in Dulwich, south London.

== Football career ==
=== Dulwich Hamlet ===
Tyson joined Dulwich Hamlet in October 1908, having previously played for the Crystal Palace reserve team. His first appearance was on 5 November, against West Ham United in a London Challenge Cup match which was lost 6–0. In the next match, two days later, Tyson scored in a 5–0 victory against Woodford. A contemporary report said of Tyson: "His personality is such as to inspire confidence in the team".

In March 1909, Tyson helped "Hamlet" to a 1–0 victory over Metrogas in the final of the Surrey Senior Cup. The following year, Hamlet again won the trophy after a replay, against Woking, with Tyson being described as "the best man on the field". In 1911, Hamlet and Nunhead shared the London Charity Cup after two drawn matches. In Tyson's last active season with Dulwich Hamlet, the club were losing finalists in both the London Charity Cup and the Surrey Senior Cup.

=== Southampton ===
Although still registered with Dulwich Hamlet, Tyson joined Southern League club Southampton in May 1911, retaining his amateur status. He made his first-team debut for the "Saints" when he was called into the side to replace Bert Lee, the club captain and regular centre-half who had refused to play out of position, in a derby match against Portsmouth on 28 September 1912. In October, Tyson had a run of eleven matches in the absence of Arthur Coates, before being replaced by Ted Salway, followed by a few matches at the end of the season.

Tyson made a total of 14 league appearances plus two in the F.A. Cup in his "Saints" career. Southampton's club historian, Duncan Holley, described Tyson as being "more robust than the average amateur, he was most useful in close quarter tussles and could be trusted to keep a tight grip on opposing forwards".

=== International career ===
Tyson was a non-playing reserve for the England amateur side for the match against Belgium at Crystal Palace on 4 March 1911. Three weeks later, on 23 March, he made his only international appearance, in a 3–1 victory against France in Paris, becoming Dulwich Hamlet's first amateur international player.

He also toured Scandinavia and Russia with the English Wanderers, playing three matches in Moscow, and represented Surrey County F.A. and London F.A.

== Teaching career ==
Tyson joined the staff at Alleyn's School in 1911, where he taught French and was in charge of football.

At the start of the First World War, Tyson established a Cadet Corp. at the school, before enlisting in the Royal Army Medical Corps, reaching the rank of Captain and becoming quartermaster with 105th Field Ambulance Corp. He was mentioned in dispatches and awarded the Belgian Croix de guerre in December 1918. The citation reads:

Il est particulièrement distingué par son courage et son devouement au cours de l'offensive des Flanders.
(He is particularly distinguished for his courage and dedication during the Flanders offensive.)

In 1921, Alleyn's School honoured Tyson by naming Tyson's House after him. At the school,

he taught (French) with great patience and precision. He was a big man but very gentle in his ways. He always had a smile and time to talk, even to the smallest boy in his House. He hardly ever punished anybody. No one thought of taking a liberty with him, he was too much of a gentleman.

During the Second World War, he established the South London Emergency Secondary School which was based within the Alleyn's school buildings, going on to become the school's headteacher. After the war, he continued as housemaster until his retirement in 1947.

== Death ==
Tyson died at Harestone Nursing Home, Caterham, Surrey, on 31 October 1964, at age 79.
