= Archie Small =

English footballer (1889–1955)

Personal information
- Full name: Archibald Rammell Small
- Date of birth: 1889
- Place of birth: Droitwich, England
- Date of death: 1955 (aged 65–66)
- Place of death: Epsom, Surrey, England
- Position: Inside forward

Senior career*
Years	Team	Apps	(Gls)
–	Royal Engineers		
1911–1913	Southampton	20	(3)
1913–1920	Royal Engineers		
- * Club domestic league appearances and goals

Archibald Rammell Small (1889–1955) was an English amateur footballer who played at inside-forward for Southampton in the years prior to World War I.

== Football career ==
Small was born in Droitwich, Worcestershire and was a prominent member of the Royal Engineers football team when employed at the Ordnance Survey offices in Southampton.

He joined Southampton as an amateur in 1911, making his first-team debut at inside-right, when he scored in a 2–2 draw at West Ham on 9 September 1911. After six matches in which the "Saints" struggled, Small was dropped and replaced by Harry Brown. He continued to play regularly for the reserves, scoring 19 goals, as a result of which he earned a County Cap for Hampshire.

By mid-March 1912, the team were continuing to struggle and were in danger of being relegated; Small was one of several players recalled for the last nine matches by manager George Swift in an ultimately successful bid to avoid relegation.

For the following season, the "Saints" recruited Fred Taylor from Wellington Town and Fred Turnbull from Coventry City and, as a result, Small was restricted to five further appearances.

By the summer of 1913, Small had left the Saints and returned to play for the Royal Engineers. After the war, he was still actively playing for the Ordnance Survey team, earning further County caps, and continued to work at the London Road premises until his retirement.
