= Arthur Brown (footballer, born 1888) =

English footballer

Personal information
- Full name: Arthur Charles Brown
- Date of birth: July qtr 1888
- Place of birth: Cowes, England
- Position: Goalkeeper

Youth career
- 1906: Southampton

Senior career*
Years	Team	Apps	(Gls)
19??–1907	Cowes		
1907–1910	Portsmouth	9	(0)
1910–1912	Southampton	39	(0)
1912–19??	Wanderers (Nova Scotia)		
- * Club domestic league appearances and goals

Arthur Charles Brown (born 1888) was an English footballer who played as a goalkeeper for Portsmouth and Southampton in the years prior to World War I.

== Football career ==
Brown was born in Cowes on the Isle of Wight and was a student at Hartley College, part of the University of Southampton. Whilst at the college, he signed for Southampton of the Southern League as an amateur. After a spell at Cowes, he signed for Portsmouth in April 1907.

Brown remained with "Pompey" for three years, where he was the third choice 'keeper behind Tom McDonald and Tom Cope, making only nine Southern League appearances, before a move back up the Solent to re-join Southampton in the summer of 1910.

Brown made his first-team debut for the "Saints", replacing Tom Burrows against Brighton & Hove Albion on 24 October 1910. He soon made the goalkeeping shirt his own, making 26 league and FA Cup appearances in 1910–11, although Burrows replaced him for six matches at the end of the season.

He regained his place in goal for the start of the following season, before William Knight replaced him in November 1911, making only four further first-team appearances.

In 1912, he was selected as the (non-playing) reserve goalkeeper for the Great Britain team at the 1912 Olympic Games in Stockholm.

== Later career ==
Soon after the Olympics, he emigrated to Canada, where he took up the position of Chief Civil Engineer on a £6 million dock scheme in Halifax, Nova Scotia.
