= Charlie Purves =

English footballer (1921-2013)

Personal information
- Full name: Charles Reuben Purves
- Date of birth: 17 February 1921
- Place of birth: High Spen, County Durham, England
- Date of death: 20 June 2013 (aged 92)
- Place of death: Southampton, England
- Height: 5 ft 6 in (1.68 m)
- Position: Inside forward

Youth career
- Newcastle United
- Shildon
- Walker Celtic
- Spennymoor United

Senior career*
Years	Team	Apps	(Gls)
1946–1951	Charlton Athletic	46	(4)
1951–1954	Southampton	30	(2)
1954–1956	Sittingbourne		
1956–1957	Margate		
1957	Chatham Town		
1957–1961	Dorchester Town		
1961–1963	Ford Sports		
1963–19??	Basingstoke Town		
- * Club domestic league appearances and goals

Charles Reuben Purves (17 February 1921 – 20 June 2013) was an English footballer who played as an inside-forward in the 1940s and 1950s. He played in the Football League for Charlton Athletic and Southampton.

== Playing career ==
Purves was born in High Spen, County Durham and as a child was a keen supporter of his local club, Newcastle United. Although he was taken on by them as a trainee, he failed to make the grade but played youth football for various clubs in the north-east.

In October 1946, he moved to London to join First Division club Charlton Athletic. In his first season at The Valley, Charlton won the FA Cup, defeating Burnley 4–0 in the Final. Purves was not in the team for the semi-final match against his boyhood heroes, Newcastle United, and turned up to watch the match at Elland Road, Leeds wearing a Newcastle United rosette, much to the displeasure of Charlton's manager, Jimmy Seed.

After five years at Charlton Athletic for whom he made 46 Football League appearances, scoring four goals, he was signed for Southampton in June 1951. He made his Southampton debut on 15 September 1951, when he took the place of Ted Bates at inside-right for a 2–0 victory over Doncaster Rovers. Although he played for five of the next six matches, he then lost his place to Jimmy McGowan. Described as a "constructive inside-right", his personal best season for the "Saints" came in 1952–53, when he made 21 appearances, although Southampton ended second from bottom and were relegated to the Third Division. Although Purves played in the opening two matches of the 1953–54 season, he was then dropped in favour of Roy Williams; his final Southampton appearance came on 6 March 1954. At the end of the season he was released, having made a total of 36 appearances with four goals for Southampton.

== Later career ==
After retiring from full-time football, Purves remained in the Southampton area, working at Vosper Thornycroft and continuing to play non-league football until his mid-40s, including a period as player-manager of Basingstoke Town.

Purves was married to Ivy Grace and had daughters Christine, Angela and sons Alan and David. He died on 20 June 2013.

== Bibliography ==
- Chalk, Gary; Holley, Duncan; Bull, David (2013). All the Saints – A Complete Players' Who's Who of Southampton FC. Hagiology Publishing. ISBN 978-0-9926864-0-6.
- Holley, Duncan; Chalk, Gary (1992). The Alphabet of the Saints. ACL & Polar Publishing. ISBN 0-9514862-3-3.
- Holley, Duncan; Chalk, Gary (2003). In That Number – A Post-war Chronicle of Southampton FC. Hagiology Publishing. ISBN 0-9534474-3-X.
- Hugman, Barry (1981). Football League Players Records (1946–1981). Aylesbury: Rothmans Publications. ISBN 0-907574-08-4.
