= Fred Smith (footballer, born 1887) =

English footballer

Personal information
- Full name: Frederick Augustus Ford Smith
- Date of birth: 16 May 1887
- Place of birth: Buxton, England
- Date of death: 23 December 1957 (aged 70)
- Place of death: Macclesfield, England
- Position: Full back

Youth career
- 1904–1905: Buxton

Senior career*
Years	Team	Apps	(Gls)
1905–1906	Wigan Town		
1906–1909	Stockport County	27	(0)
1909–1910	Derby County	5	(0)
1910–1913	Macclesfield	87	(8)
1913–1914	Southampton	16	(0)
1920–1923	Macclesfield	27	(4)
- * Club domestic league appearances and goals

Frederick Augustus Ford Smith (16 May 1887 – 23 December 1957) was an English footballer who played as a full back in the period prior to World War I.

== Football career ==
He was born in Buxton and started his career playing in the Manchester League before signing for a fledgling Wigan Town in December 1905. His professional career began in 1906 during which he played League football for Stockport County and Derby County before giving up playing full-time to concentrate on his job as a motor mechanic in Macclesfield.

In May 1913, he was recruited by Southern Football League Southampton, by when he was at the "veteran" stage of his career. He initially played for the reserve team, where he was appointed captain. His "clean cut, up-standing image" had a beneficial effect on the youngsters. Following three successive defeats in October 1913, he made his first-team debut in a 2–0 defeat at Reading on 1 November, replacing Bert Lee at right-back. His "determination and speed" enabled him to retain his place for the next ten games, before giving way to Richard Brooks in January. Smith made a further five appearances in the latter part of the season.

At the end of the season, he was struggling to retain full fitness and decided to retire to concentrate on his motor career and returned to Macclesfield.

== Family ==
Fred was a brother to William "Buxton" Smith who played for Buxton, Manchester City, and to Lancelot who also played for Wigan Town.
