= Tom Burrows (footballer) =

English footballer

Personal information
- Full name: Thomas Burrows
- Date of birth: 1886
- Place of birth: Portsmouth, England
- Height: 6 ft 2 in (1.88 m)
- Position: Goalkeeper

Youth career
- St Mary's Swifts (Southampton)

Senior career*
Years	Team	Apps	(Gls)
1904–1911	Southampton	84	(0)
1911–1915	Merthyr Town		
- * Club domestic league appearances and goals

Thomas Burrows (born 1886) was an English footballer who played as a goalkeeper for Southampton and Merthyr Town in the years prior to World War I.

== Football career ==
Burrows was born in Portsmouth and was employed at Stevens' shipyard at Weston before embarking on a career as a professional footballer. He joined Southern League champions Southampton in 1904 as third-choice goalkeeper behind George Clawley and Michael Byrne. After spending most of the season playing for the second team in the Western League, Burrows made his debut for the first team in the last match of the 1904–05 season, a 1–0 defeat by Queens Park Rangers on 29 April 1905.

A tall, able goalkeeper, Burrows retained his place for the first three months of the following season before injury allowed Clawley to reclaim the No. 1 shirt, which he kept until his retirement in the summer of 1907. As a result of a serious injury sustained in October 1906, Burrows was unable to step-up on Clawley's retirement, and had to be content to act as cover for new signing Herbert Lock. Following an injury to Lock (sustained at Watford's Cassio Road ground), Burrows took over in March 1908 for the rest of the season, but Lock was again preferred for the start of the 1908–09 season. Lock was once again injured at Cassio Road in March 1909, allowing Burrows to take over the custodian's shirt. This was the start of a run of 48 consecutive appearances in goal for Burrows, but an indifferent start to the 1910–11 season allowed Arthur Brown the opportunity to replace him. Burrows was once again recalled in April 1911 for the last month of the season, before moving on in the summer.

He then joined another Southern League club, Merthyr Town, where he remained as virtually an ever-present until the start of the First World War.
