= Fred Turnbull (footballer, born 1888) =

English footballer

Personal information
- Full name: Frederick Stephen Turnbull
- Date of birth: 1888
- Place of birth: Wallsend, England
- Date of death: 1959 (aged 70–71)
- Place of death: South Shields, England
- Height: 5 ft 7 in (1.70 m)
- Position: Inside forward

Senior career*
| Years | Team | Apps | (Gls) |
| 1909–1911 | Newcastle United | 0 | (0) |
| 1911–1912 | Coventry City | | |
| 1912–1913 | Southampton | 23 | (2) |
| 1913–19?? | North Shields Athletic | | |
- * Club domestic league appearances and goals

Frederick Stephen Turnbull (1888–1959) was an English professional footballer who played at inside-forward for Coventry City and Southampton in the 1910s.

== Football career ==
Turnbull was born in Wallsend and joined Newcastle United in 1909. After two years playing reserve team football for Newcastle, he joined Coventry City of the Southern League in the summer of 1911.

On 13 January 1912, Turnbull scored the opening goal in a 2–0 FA Cup victory at Southampton (with the other from Harry Parkes), although Coventry went out in the next round, losing 5–1 to Manchester United.

In the summer of 1912, Coventry City's trainer, Jimmy McIntyre, moved to Southern League rivals, Southampton as trainer under secretary Ernest Arnfield. In October, with the "Saints" only winning one of their first eight matches, McIntyre returned to Coventry to sign Turnbull in an effort to improve the team's goal-scoring. Turnbull made his debut on 19 October, replacing Fred Taylor at home to Brighton & Hove Albion; although he scored on his debut, the match ended 5–2 in favour of Brighton. Despite scoring only one further league goal, Turnbull retained his place in the team for the remainder of the season, other than a spell out injured in January/February when he was replaced by Archie Small.

He was released in the summer of 1913 and returned to his native north east where he played out his career with North Shields Athletic in the North Eastern League.
