= Richard Brookes (footballer) =

English footballer

Personal information
- Place of birth: Reading, Berkshire, England
- Height: 5 ft 10 in (1.78 m)
- Position: Full-back

Youth career
- King's Royal Rifle Corps
- 1908–1910: Royal Garrison Artillery

Senior career*
Years	Team	Apps	(Gls)
1910–1911	Eastleigh Athletic		
1911–1912	Reading		
1912–1914	Southampton	19	(0)
1919–1920	Southampton	0	(0)
- * Club domestic league appearances and goals

Richard Brookes (fl. 1908–1920) was an English professional footballer who played as a full-back for various clubs in the early years of the 20th century.

== Football career ==
Brookes was born in Reading, Berkshire and after a career in the Army, with the King's Royal Rifle Corps and the Royal Garrison Artillery in Essex, in 1910 he found employment at the Eastleigh Works of the London and South Western Railway. He was playing for Eastleigh Athletic in the Hampshire League where he was spotted by scouts from his home-town club, Reading of the Southern League, joining them in March 1911.

After a season with Reading, he returned to Hampshire when he joined another Southern League side, Southampton in August 1912. At The Dell he had to wait until 21 March 1913 before making his first team debut, when he replaced Arthur Coates at right-back in a 2–1 victory at Brentford. Described as "a strong, burly full-back with, at times, an inclination to be over-exuberant", Brookes retained his place for five matches, before being replaced by the veteran Bert Lee.

Brookes was recalled for the third match of the 1913–14 season, but after six matches Lee returned briefly before Fred Smith took over at right-back. Brookes was recalled in January for a further seven matches before Smith returned.

Brookes left the Dell in 1914 to rejoin the Army following the outbreak of World War I, but returned in 1919, spending a season in the reserves.
