= Joseph Salway =

British artist and surveyor

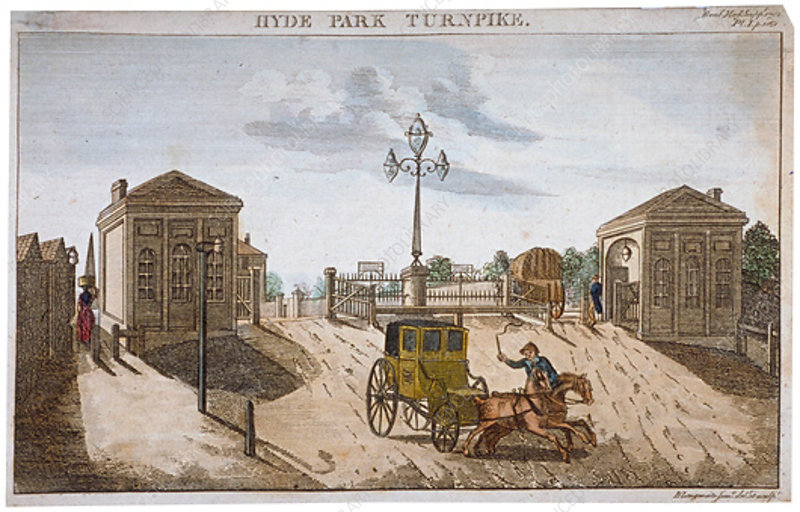
The Hyde Park Gate in London, erected by the Kensington Turnpike Trust. This was the first toll point encountered along the Bath Road, upon leaving London.

Joseph Salway was a British artist and surveyor.

The Kensington Turnpike Trust was formed by Act of Parliament in 1725 to care for several important roads to the west of London. Its Trustees employed Joseph Salway, an artist and surveyor, to create a plan of the Turnpike road from Hyde Park Corner to Counter's Bridge, next to what are now the Olympia Exhibition Halls in West Kensington.

Beginning his work in 1811, Salway created fifteen large water-coloured drawings with a meticulous level of detail, order and symmetry. The bottom half of the drawings depict the Turnpike road in plan (from above) and faithfully record the road's kennels (gutters), drains and grates, with written notes regarding the particulars of the drainage for certain sections of road. The pavement's show cobbled paths, the parish water pumps, hitching posts for horses and individually numbered lampposts, represented three-dimensionally complete with shadow. Private gardens are shown, revealing the formal designs of neat lawns, garden paths lined with trees and turning circles for carriages. The top half of the drawings show the elevation looking north, a street-level view corresponding to the view an observer would have standing in the middle of the road. The architectural details of the houses, churches, shops and taverns are faithfully illustrated, with various properties marked with written notes on their usage: a floor cloth manufactory, the original Horse Barracks, and many pubs, many now closed but some remain, such as the Hand & Flower pub on Portland Road in Olympia.

The original drawings are held by the British Museum. They were republished by the London Topographical Society in 1903 with the title "Plan of the road from Hyde Park Corner to Counter's Bridge". The folio's title page states that was "Made for the Kensington Turnpike Trustees by their Surveyor, Joseph Salway in the Year 1811. Lithographed on thirty sheets from the original drawings in the British Museum for the London Topographical Society by W. Griggs and Sons, Limited". The British Library has a copy of this publication in its collection and has made all of its lithographs available on its website.

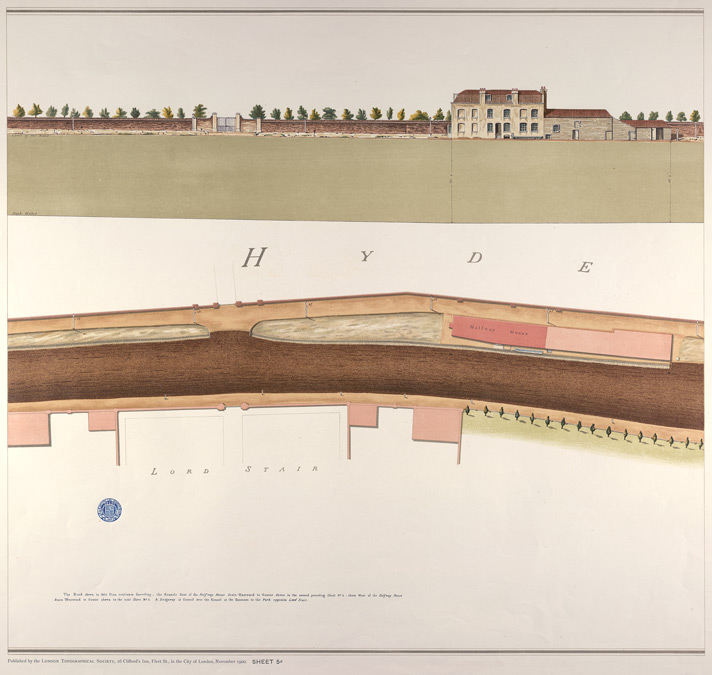
One of the lithographs, showing the Halfway House, Kensington. An ancient inn, with ramshackle stables and pigsties, long popular with highwaymen

The original 15 drawings were reprinted as 30 lithographic plates, numbered from 1 to 15a with each measuring 610 x 686 mm (24 inches to 27 inches). Laid end-to-end the drawings would be 60 feet long, representing a panorama of 2.6 miles from the Piccadilly Turnpike at Hyde Park Corner down to Scotch Corner and all the way along Knightsbridge and Kensington High Street to Counter's Bridge, where the borough of Kensington and Chelsea ends and Hammersmith begins.

A fascinating and detailed description of the buildings along the road and its inhabitants at the turn of the 19th century by Colonel W. F. Prideaux was included in the 1903-1904 edition of the London Topographical Record, the annual report of the London Topographical Society.
