= Francis Salway =

British businessman (born 1957)

- Born: 5 October 1957 (age 68)
- Education: Rugby School
- Alma mater: Christ's College, Cambridge
- Occupation: Businessman
- Spouse: Sarah Peplow

Francis Salway (born 5 October 1957) is a British businessman. He was the chief executive officer of Land Securities from 2004 to 2012. He is the chairman of the Town and Country Housing Group.

== Early life ==
Francis Salway was born on 5 October 1957. He was educated at the Rugby School. He studied land economy at Christ's College, Cambridge, where he earned a bachelor of arts degree in 1979 and a master of arts degree in 1983.

== Career ==
Salway began his career in commercial real estate as a trainee surveyor Richard Ellis (now known as CBRE Group) from 1979 to 1982, followed by Abacus Developments from 1982 to 1985. He worked at Standard Life from 1986 to 2000, when he joined Land Securities. He served as its chief operating officer from 2003 to 2004, and as its chief executive officer from 2004 to 2012. In 2010, he "announced plans for three major developments — two in Victoria, one in Mayfair — totalling £655 million." He was also the president of the British Property Federation.

Salway has served as the chairman of the Town and Country Housing Group since 2012. He is also the chairman of the property advisory group of Transport for London. Additionally, he is a non-executive director of Next plc and the Cadogan Group.

== Personal life ==
Salway married Sarah Peplow in 1985. They have a son and a daughter. They reside in Royal Tunbridge Wells, England.

== Works ==
- Salway, Francis (1986). Depreciation of Commercial Property. Reading, U.K.: College of Estate Management. ISBN 9780947763152. OCLC 15662608.
