= William Knight (footballer) =

English footballer

Personal information
- Full name: William Knight
- Place of birth: Toogates, Tamworth, England
- Position: Goalkeeper

Senior career*
Years	Team	Apps	(Gls)
19??–1907	Walsall		
1907–1910	Aston Villa	0	(0)
1910–1911	Stourbridge		
1911–1913	Southampton	38	(0)
- * Club domestic league appearances and goals

William Knight was an English professional footballer who played as a goalkeeper for Southampton in the years prior to World War I.

== Football career ==
Knight was born in Toogates, Tamworth and began his career at Walsall, before being spotted by Aston Villa in 1907. He joined Villa as an amateur and spent some time with their nursery club, Stourbridge. In 1911, he had a trial with Southampton of the Southern League, in which he "shaped up well" and, much against the wishes of the Villa directors, he moved to the south coast in May 1911.

He made his debut for the "Saints" when he replaced Arthur Brown for the match at Luton Town on 18 November 1911. At first he was an "agile and vigilant custodian" whose only fault was that he was "inclined to come off his line too hurriedly". He became the first-choice keeper for the rest of the 1911–12 season, but in October 1912 he lost his place to the veteran George Kitchen, after the team had managed only one victory with six defeats in the first nine games. Although Kinight was to be recalled for five matches at the end of the season, he left the club in the summer of 1913.
