= Tom Cope =

English footballer (1880–1931)

Personal information
- Full name: John Thomas Cope
- Date of birth: 1880
- Place of birth: Bilston, England
- Date of death: 1931 (aged 50–51)
- Position: Goalkeeper

Senior career*
Years	Team	Apps	(Gls)
1904–1905	Clowne White Star		
1905–1909	Chesterfield Town	127	(0)
1909–1910	Portsmouth		
1910–1911	Sunderland	0	(0)
1911–1912	Frickley Colliery		
1912	Clowne Rising Star		
Total		127	(0)
- * Club domestic league appearances and goals

John Thomas Cope (1880–1931) was an English footballer who played in the Football League for Chesterfield Town.
