= Arthur Coates (cricketer) =

English cricketer

Arthur Coates (2 August 1848 – 19 August 1897) was an English cricketer. He was a right-handed batsman who played for Gloucestershire. He was born in Pemberton, Wigan, Lancashire and died in Los Angeles.

Coates made a single first-class appearance for the team, against Surrey, during the 1873 season. In the only innings in which he batted, he scored 2 runs.
