= Roy Williams (footballer) =

English footballer (1932–2011)

Personal information
- Full name: Royston Brian Williams
- Date of birth: 3 March 1932
- Place of birth: Hereford, England
- Date of death: 25 October 2011 (aged 79)
- Place of death: Hereford, England
- Height: 5 ft 4 in (1.63 m)
- Position: Inside forward

Youth career
- Hereford Lads' Club
- Thynnes Athletic

Senior career*
Years	Team	Apps	(Gls)
1947–1952	Hereford United		
1952–1955	Southampton	41	(7)
1955–1963	Hereford United		
- Worcester City
- Cinderford Town
- * Club domestic league appearances and goals

Royston Brian "Roy" Williams (3 March 1932 – 25 October 2011) was an English footballer who played as an inside forward for Hereford United and Southampton during the 1950s.

== Football career ==
Williams was born in Hereford and began his football career at local club Hereford United in August 1947.

In November 1952, he signed for Southampton for a fee of £4,000, making his debut at inside-right in a 1–1 draw away to Fulham on 26 December 1952. Fulham came to The Dell on the following day and "the Saints" won 5–3, with Williams scoring the second Southampton goal with a header after 31 minutes to bring the scores level; the other Saints' goals were scored by Frank Dudley with a hat-trick and Johnny Walker. Williams made a total of ten appearances (at either inside-right or inside-left) during the 1952–53 season at the end of which Southampton were relegated to Division Three.

Williams was only 5 ft 4in tall and was probably the smallest forward ever to play for Southampton, but he had a stocky build and was able to "mix it" with the toughest defenders and soon became a first-team regular. In the 1953–54 season, he became a fixture at inside-right until January, when he was dropped with Walker moving across from the left and Henry Horton taking over at inside-left. Williams returned for the last four matches of the season, in which the Saints finished in sixth place, after having been first or second until late-January.

In the next season, Williams only made a handful of appearances with Tommy Mulgrew and Johnny Walker now firmly established at inside-right and left respectively. In his three seasons at The Dell, Williams scored seven goals from 41 league appearances.

In July 1955, he returned to Hereford United and went on to become the second highest goalscorer in the club's history. In total he scored 154 goals in 357 appearances for Hereford.

In April 1961, he was rewarded with a benefit match at Edgar Street against Southampton. He later played for Worcester City and Cinderford Town.

After retiring from football, Williams ran a cleaning business in Hereford. He died in October 2011.
