= Fred Taylor (footballer, born 1890) =

Edwardian footballer (1890–?)

Personal information
- Full name: Frederick Taylor
- Place of birth: Halesowen, England
- Height: 5 ft 8 in (1.73 m)
- Position: Inside forward

Senior career*
Years	Team	Apps	(Gls)
1910	Stourbridge		
1910–1911	Hull City	0	(0)
1911–1912	Wellington Town		
1912–1913	Southampton	13	(2)
1913–1915	Barrow		
- * Club domestic league appearances and goals

Frederick Taylor was an English professional footballer who played at inside-forward for various clubs in the period prior to the First World War.

== Football career ==
Taylor was born at Halesowen, Worcestershire (now West Midlands) and started his professional football career in January 1910 with Stourbridge, playing in the Birmingham & District League. In the summer of 1910, he moved to Yorkshire to join Hull City of the Football League Second Division, where he spent a year in the reserves, failing to break into the first-team.

The 1911 close-season saw a move back to Shropshire and the Birmingham & District League, when Taylor joined Wellington Town. During the 1911–12 season, he gained a reputation as a prolific scorer with 27 goals. This brought him to the attention of several larger clubs, including Coventry City. In the summer of 1912, Coventry City's trainer, Jimmy McIntyre, moved to Southern League rivals, Southampton as trainer under secretary Ernest Arnfield. On arrival at The Dell, McIntyre recommended Taylor to his new club, who signed him ready for the 1912–13 season.

Taylor made his debut for the "Saints" in the opening match of the season, playing at inside-right in a 2–2 draw with Northampton Town on 4 September. Taylor found the pace at first-class level much faster than in non-league football and after only one goal in eleven games, he lost his place to another new signing, Fred Turnbull. Taylor made two further appearances, scoring once more, but spent the remainder of the season playing in Southampton's Southern Alliance team, scoring four goals from twelve appearances.

In the summer of 1913, he moved to Lancashire to join Barrow, then playing in the Lancashire Combination.
