= Ted Salway =

English footballer

Personal information
- Full name: Edward Elijah Salway
- Date of birth: April qtr. 1891
- Place of birth: Nursling, England
- Date of death: October qtr. 1950 (aged 59)
- Place of death: Southampton, England
- Height: 5 ft 11 in (1.80 m)
- Position: Centre-half

Youth career
- Romsey Town
- Nursling United

Senior career*
Years	Team	Apps	(Gls)
1911–1915	Southampton	10	(0)
- * Club domestic league appearances and goals

Edward Elijah Salway (1891–1950) was an English professional footballer who played in various midfield roles for Southampton in the Southern League in 1912–13. His career was ended by injuries received at the Battle of Ypres in 1917.

== Football career ==
Salway was born at Nursling, just outside Southampton and played as an amateur for Romsey Town and Nursling United while working as a gardener. In 1911, he had a trial match with Southampton which he came through successfully to earn a professional contract. Described as "a rough diamond with plenty of potential, ... pace and inexhaustible energy", he spent his first year at The Dell in the reserves where he was "polished into a fine half-back", gaining representative honours with the Hampshire F.A.

His first-team debut came on 5 October 1912, when he took the place of Jim McAlpine at left-half for the Southern League match at Exeter City. The match ended in a 1–0 defeat, but despite this Salway retained his place for the next two matches. He returned to the side in December when he replaced Charles Tyson at centre-half for five matches, followed by two matches at inside-left. Of Salway's ten first-team matches, eight ended in defeats, with two victories, as the "Saints" struggled to find any consistency under new manager Jimmy McIntyre, finishing fourth from the foot of the table.

Salway remained with Southampton, playing in the reserves, until the suspension of league football in 1915. He enlisted in the army in October 1915, but continued to play for Southampton, making three appearances in the 1915–16 South Western Combination as well as eight appearances in friendly matches.

== Later career ==
In 1916, his military career took him to the Western Front, where he was seriously wounded in 1917 at the Battle of Ypres. He lost an eye and a lower arm and was invalided out of the army.

In May 1920, Southampton arranged a benefit match at The Dell for Salway, when a Southampton XI played against a Portsmouth XI. Salway later found employment at Southampton Docks, working as a flagman, cycling there every day from his home at Nursling, approximately five miles each way.

His son, Tony, was a trainee footballer who played for Southampton's "A" team in the 1940s.
