= Roger Fry (footballer) =

English footballer (born 1948)

Personal information
- Full name: Roger Norman Fry
- Date of birth: 18 August 1948 (age 78)
- Place of birth: Southampton, England
- Position: Defender

Senior career*
Years	Team	Apps	(Gls)
1967–1973	Southampton	23	(0)
1973–1977	Walsall	136	(0)
1977–	Salisbury		(8)
Total		159	(0)
- * Club domestic league appearances and goals

Roger Norman Fry (born 18 August 1948) is an English former footballer.

== Playing career ==
Fry began his career as a youngster with Southampton Schools, having been a fan of Southampton since he was a young boy. While working as an apprentice at the docks in Southampton, he was spotted by the club and signed professional terms as a 19-year-old in October 1967. After 3 seasons of reserve football at Southampton he made his debut in the final game of the 1970–71 season against Crystal Palace at The Dell. Facing large amounts of competition for his place, Fry never really had an extended run in the first team but still managed 22 league games and 3 cup appearances over the next season. The following season he suffered a number of injuries and only featured in reserve matches, so he made the move to Walsall in July 1973.

At Walsall, Fry made 136 appearances over the next four seasons, before being released by manager Dave Mackay. He returned south to play for Salisbury City before joining North Baddesley in 1980.
