= Arthur Coates (footballer) =

English footballer

Personal information
- Date of birth: 10 August 1882
- Place of birth: Feetham, North Yorkshire, England
- Date of death: 13 March 1955 (aged 72)
- Place of death: Manchester, England
- Height: 5 ft 10 in (1.78 m)
- Position: Full back

Senior career*
Years	Team	Apps	(Gls)
–	Salford United		
–	Heywood United		
1910–1912	Exeter City		
1912–1913	Southampton	21	(0)
1913–19??	Heywood United		
- * Club domestic league appearances and goals

Arthur Coates (10 August 1882 – 13 March 1955) was an English professional footballer who played as a full-back for various clubs in the early years of the 20th century.

== Football career ==
Coates was born in Feetham, North Yorkshire but started his football career in the Greater Manchester area, first with Salford United before joining Heywood United of the Lancashire Combination.

In 1910, he was spotted by former England international Arthur Chadwick, then manager of Southern League team Exeter City. After a season at Exeter, Coates moved along the south coast to join fellow Southern League team, Southampton as a replacement for right-back Jack Eastham who had just retired.

Coates made his debut for the "Saints" in the opening match of the 1912–13 season, a 2–2 draw with Northampton Town. Nine matches into the season, he lost his place to the veteran Bert Lee but returned in December. Despite showing "early promise", his form faded as the season went on and in March he was dropped in favour of Richard Brooks.

In the summer of 1913, Coates was released and returned to Lancashire to re-join Heywood United.
