= Billy Minter =

English footballer (1888–1940)

Personal information
- Full name: William James Minter
- Date of birth: 16 April 1888
- Place of birth: Woolwich, London, England
- Date of death: 21 May 1940 (aged 52)
- Place of death: Bruce Grove, Tottenham, London
- Position: Inside forward

Senior career*
Years	Team	Apps	(Gls)
- Norwich City
1905	Woolwich Arsenal		
1906–1908	Reading		
1908–1920	Tottenham Hotspur	243	(95)

Managerial career
- 1927–1929: Tottenham Hotspur
- * Club domestic league appearances and goals

William James Minter (16 April 1888 – 21 May 1940), was a footballer, trainer, manager and assistant secretary at Tottenham Hotspur. He scored 101 goals for Tottenham, and was for a time the top scorer for the club. He also managed the club for three years, and after he resigned as manager he stayed at the club until his death in 1940.

== Personal life ==
Minter was born in Woolwich in 1888. In 1908, he married Elizabeth Elisabeth “Lizzie Whybrow at St. Thomas Church.

== Playing career ==
Minter started his playing career as an amateur at Norwich City, and then at Woolwich Arsenal in 1905 for three months playing largely in the reserve team. He then joined Reading before moving to Spurs in March 1908. His first goal for the club came on his debut against Millwall. Spurs was elected to the Football League Second Division in 1908. In Spurs' first year in the Football League, Minter scored 16 goals for the club, which finished runner-up in the Second Division that season and was promoted to the First Division. Spurs however struggled in their first year in the top flight, but narrowly avoided relegation when they beat Chelsea in the last game of the season with goals from Minter and a former Chelsea player Percy Humphreys, sending Chelsea down instead. Minter become top-scorer for a few seasons and helped the club retain top flight status for a number of years. He remained as a player for Spurs until 1920, making 334 appearances and scoring 101 goals the club in all competitions. He was the top scorer for the club until the record was broken by Jimmy Dimmock in 1930.

Minter joined the military service in May 1915 after the outbreak of the First World War. He served as a sergeant and was awarded the Meritorious Service Medal, but was wounded in October 1917. Not long after his return from the war he was made club captain only to announce his retirement at the end of the 1919–20 season after being replaced in the starting line-up by Jimmy Banks.

After retiring as player, he was appointed trainer at Tottenham in June 1920, serving under Peter McWilliam. He was also a trainer for the England team in 1926. Although retired, he continued to be involved in the Spurs team would play a further game for Spurs filling in for Frank Osborne who was taken ill before an away game to Hull.

== Managerial career ==
Minter took over as manager of Tottenham on 28 February 1927 when Peter McWilliam left to manage Middlesbrough. However, in the 1927–28 season, Minter's first season as manager, Spurs was relegated to the Second Division. Although the season started well with Spurs, a series of bad results saw the club dropping down the table. That Spurs was relegated that season was unfortunate as the club had 38 points, a record number of points for a relegated club at a time when it was only two points gained for a win, and the clubs in the First Division were tightly packed with only six points separating 4th place Derby and relegated Spurs. One crucial reason, however, may be Minter's decision to sell Jimmy Seed to Sheffield Wednesday, whose place in the team was taken by the younger Taffy O'Callaghan. Wednesday were struggling at the bottom of Division One, but Seed not only helped Wednesday escape relegation (beating Tottenham twice in the process), furthermore he led them to the League Championship the next two years.

Minter failed to lift the club out of Second Division, finishing tenth in 1928–29 season. During the 1929–30 season (where Tottenham would finish 12th), on 20 November 1929, he resigned due to failing health, brought on by the stress of an unsuccessful reign. He was succeeded by Percy Smith. Despite this he still remained dedicated to the club and took up a position in the club's administrate offices – a post he held until his death on 21 May 1940.

== Honors ==
Tottenham Hotspur

- Football League Second Division: 1919–20
