= Bob McDonald (Scottish footballer) =

Scottish footballer

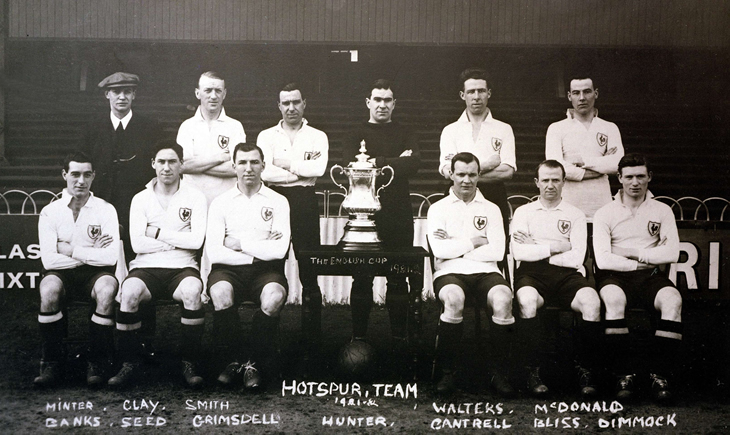

Personal information
- Full name: Robert James McDonald
- Date of birth: 25 February 1895
- Place of birth: Inverness, Scotland
- Date of death: 1971 (aged 75–76)
- Height: 5 ft 10 1/2 in (1.79 m)
- Position: Full back

Youth career
- Caledonian

Senior career*
Years	Team	Apps	(Gls)
1919–1924	Tottenham Hotspur	125	(0)
1927–1928	Clapton Orient	37	(0)
- * Club domestic league appearances and goals

Robert James McDonald (25 February 1895 – 1971) was a professional footballer who played for Inverness Caledonian, Tottenham Hotspur and Clapton Orient.

== Football career ==
McDonald joined Spurs from Inverness Caledonian in 1919. Playing as a full back, he made a total of 125 appearances in all competitions in his time at White Hart Lane. The highlight of his Tottenham career was to be a member of the winning 1921 FA Cup Final team. He moved to Clapton Orient in 1927 and went on to play a further 37 matches.

== Honours ==
Tottenham Hotspur

- FA Cup: 1920–21
