= Alf Riley =

English footballer

Personal information
- Full name: Alfred Riley
- Date of birth: 7 December 1889
- Place of birth: Stafford, England
- Date of death: 1958 (aged 68–69)
- Height: 5 ft 7 in (1.70 m)
- Position: Wing half

Senior career*
Years	Team	Apps	(Gls)
1911–1912	Wellington Town		
1912–1913	Stafford Rangers		
1913–1923	Wolverhampton Wanderers	112	(1)
Total		112	(1)
- * Club domestic league appearances and goals

Alfred Riley (7 December 1889–1958) was an English footballer who played in the Football League for Wolverhampton Wanderers. He played in the 1921 FA Cup Final as Wolves lost 1–0 to Tottenham Hotspur.

== Honours ==
Wolverhampton Wanderers

- FA Cup runner-up: 1920–21
