= Bert Smith (footballer, born 1892) =

English footballer

Personal information
- Full name: Bertram Smith
- Date of birth: 6 March 1892
- Place of birth: Higham, Kent, England
- Date of death: 12 September 1969 (aged 77)
- Height: 5 ft 7 1/2 in (1.71 m)
- Position: Right half

Youth career
- Vanbrugh Park
- Crawford United

Senior career*
Years	Team	Apps	(Gls)
19??–1913	Metrogas		
1913–1915	Huddersfield Town	16	(5)
1919–1930	Tottenham Hotspur	291	(9)

International career
1921–1922	England	2	(0)
- * Club domestic league appearances and goals

Bertram "Bert" Smith (6 March 1892 – 12 September 1969) was a professional footballer, who played for Huddersfield Town, Tottenham Hotspur and played international football for England.

== Career ==
Smith was born in Higham, Kent and initially played for a number of lower league sides (Vanbrugh Park, Crawford United, Metrogas) as well as playing for an Army side, before making it into the top flight of football with Huddersfield Town. He played at right half and transferred to Spurs on 19 August 1919. During his time at the club he made 319 appearances and scored ten goals in all competitions. The highlight of his Spurs career was collecting a winners' medal in the 1921 FA Cup Final. He also took part in a number of fiercely fought matches with local rivals Arsenal. In the match in September 1922 a major fracas broke out after a Spurs goal.

The reporter from The Sunday Evening Telegram recorded that:

"After the Spurs goal came the most disgraceful scene I have witnessed on any ground at any time. Players pulled the referee, blows with fists were exchanged, and all the dignity that appertains in the referee was rudely trampled on." In the aftermath, following a Commission of Inquiry, Tottenham's Bert Smith was found to have used "filthy language" and suspended for a month. Arsenal's Alex Graham was censured for retaliating instead of reporting matters to the ref, and Stephen Dunn (Arsenal's goalkeeper) for his conduct after Tottenham's goal was allowed to stand."

Smith's international career comprised two games for England. He debuted on 9 April 1921 against Scotland and played his second match against Wales on 13 March 1922.

Smith finished his career at Spurs in May 1931 when he joined Northfleet United F.C. a club affiliated with Tottenham, as a coach. In later years he went on to be coach/trainer at Young Boys in Switzerland, Harwich and Parkeston, Hitchin and Stevenage Borough.

== Career statistics ==
=== International ===
Appearances and goals by national team and year
National team	Year	Apps	Goals
England	1921	1	0
England	1922	1	0
Total		2	0

== Honours ==
Tottenham Hotspur

- FA Cup: 1920–21
