= Frank Burrill (footballer) =

English footballer (1892–1962)

Personal information
- Full name: Francis Burrill
- Date of birth: 30 August 1892
- Place of birth: Manor Park, London, England
- Date of death: 1962 (aged 69–70)
- Position: Inside forward

Senior career*
Years	Team	Apps	(Gls)
1911–1919	West Ham United		
1919–1920	Southend United		
1920–1923	Wolverhampton Wanderers	61	(16)
1923–1924	Charlton Athletic	13	(4)
1924–1925	Walsall	39	(14)
Total		113	(34)
- * Club domestic league appearances and goals

Francis Burrill (30 August 1892 – 1962) was an English footballer who played in the Football League for Charlton Athletic, Walsall and Wolverhampton Wanderers. At Wolves, Burrill played in the 1921 FA Cup Final where they lost to Tottenham Hotspur.

== Honours ==
Wolverhampton Wanderers

- FA Cup runner-up: 1920–21
