= Tancy Lea =

English footballer

Personal information
- Full name: Thomas Lea
- Date of birth: 2 September 1890
- Place of birth: Shrewsbury, England
- Date of death: 1979 (aged 88–89)
- Height: 5 ft 9 1/2 in (1.77 m)
- Position: Winger

Senior career*
Years	Team	Apps	(Gls)
1909–1910	Ditherington Athletic		
1910–1911	Whitchurch		
1911–1912	Chester		
1912–1913	Oswestry United		
1913–1922	Wolverhampton Wanderers	47	(3)
1922–1924	Bristol Rovers	49	(2)
1924	Shrewsbury Town		
Total		96	(5)
- * Club domestic league appearances and goals

Thomas Lea (2 September 1890 – 1979) was an English footballer who played in the Football League for Bristol Rovers and Wolverhampton Wanderers. He played in the 1921 FA Cup Final as Wolves lost 1–0 to Tottenham Hotspur.

== Honours ==
Wolverhampton Wanderers

- FA Cup runner-up: 1920–21
