= George Marshall (footballer, born 1896) =

English footballer

Personal information
- Full name: George Harold Marshall
- Date of birth: 3 March 1896
- Place of birth: Walker, Newcastle upon Tyne, England
- Position: Full-back

Senior career*
Years	Team	Apps	(Gls)
1912–1913	Shankhouse		
1913	Newcastle City		
1913–1919	Southend United		
1919–1923	Wolverhampton Wanderers	102	(1)
1923–1924	Walsall	11	(0)
1924	Reading	0	(0)
1924–1925	Bournemouth & Boscombe Athletic	20	(0)
1925	Darlaston		
Total		133	(1)
- * Club domestic league appearances and goals

George Harold Marshall (3 March 1896–unknown) was an English footballer who played in the Football League for Bournemouth & Boscombe Athletic, Walsall and Wolverhampton Wanderers. At Wolves, Marshall played in the 1921 FA Cup Final where they lost to Tottenham Hotspur.

== Honours ==
Wolverhampton Wanderers

- FA Cup runner-up: 1920–21
