= Jimmy Banks (English footballer) =

English footballer

Personal information
- Full name: James Andrew Banks
- Date of birth: 28 April 1893
- Place of birth: Wigan, England
- Date of death: 1942
- Height: 5 ft 6 in (1.68 m)
- Position: Inside forward

Senior career*
Years	Team	Apps	(Gls)
- Starcliffe Celtic
- St Gregorys
- All Saints
- Spennymoor United
- Willington
1913–1922	Tottenham Hotspur	69	(6)
1923–1926	Norwich City	124	(22)
1927–?	Luton Town	13	(2)
- * Club domestic league appearances and goals

James Andrew Banks (28 April 1893 – 1942) was an English professional footballer who played for Starcliffe Celtic, St Gregorys, All Saints, Spennymoor United, Willington, Tottenham Hotspur, Norwich City and Luton Town.

== Football career ==
Between 1913 and 1922, Banks played mainly as an inside forward scoring 10 goals in 78 appearances in all competitions for Tottenham Hotspur. The highlight of his career at Tottenham was collecting a winners' medal in the 1921 FA Cup Final. On leaving White Hart Lane in 1923 he joined Norwich City where he featured in 124 matches and netted 23 goals for the Carrow Road club. In 1927 Banks moved to Luton Town where he went on to compete in a further 13 games and scored twice.

== Honours ==
Tottenham Hotspur

- FA Cup: 1920–21
