= Thomas Clay =

English footballer and manager

Personal information
- Date of birth: 19 November 1892
- Place of birth: Leicester, England
- Date of death: 21 February 1949 (aged 56)
- Place of death: Southend, England
- Height: 5 ft 9 in (1.75 m)
- Position: Full back

Youth career
- Belvoir Sunday School

Senior career*
Years	Team	Apps	(Gls)
1911–1914	Leicester Fosse		
1914–1929	Tottenham Hotspur	318	(23)
1916–1918	→ Notts County (loan)		

International career
1920	England	4	(0)

Managerial career
- 1929: Northfleet
- 1931: St. Albans City
- * Club domestic league appearances and goals

Thomas Clay (19 November 1892 – 21 February 1949) was a professional footballer who played fullback for Leicester Fosse (the original name for Leicester City), Tottenham Hotspur and England during the 1910s and 1920s.

== Biography ==
=== Football career ===
Thomas Clay joined Leicester Fosse in April 1911 and made his first appearance for the team against Bradford Park Avenue F.C. on 11 November that year, having previously made a name for himself for local side Belvoir Sunday School Juniors.

Tommy came to the attention of Tottenham during an FA Cup tie between the two sides in 1914. Together with teammate Harry Sparrow he was signed by Spurs following the match. Tommy played for Spurs throughout the First World War participating in 107 friendly matches. He captained the side in 1920 when it won the Second division title. In March 1921 he kept a clean sheet as stand-in goalkeeper in a 1 – 0 victory over Sunderland. Later the same year, although not captain, he played in the 1921 FA Cup Final. He continued to play for Tottenham, totting-up 318 league appearances (23 goals) and 33 FA Cup matches (1 goal), until May 1929 when he became player-coach at Northfleet club with close associations with Tottenham. In August 1930 he was appointed coach of newly formed amateur team, Bedouins, and in 1931–32 season he coached St Albans City.

He won his first of four England Caps against Wales at Highbury on 15 March 1920 and the last on 8 April 1922 against Scotland

=== Cricket coaching and later career ===
In 1923 Thomas had been a trialist for Leicestershire County Cricket Club and between 1926 and 1929 during his time at Spurs he took up cricket coaching at Public Schools including Highgate, St Paul's and Berkhamsted.

He coached Dutch football side HVV Den Haag between 1937 and 1939.

After retiring from football he subsequently ran a pub and sports outfitters in St Albans. He was working as a builders' labourer in Southend-on-Sea when he died in 1949, aged 56.

== Honours ==
Tottenham Hotspur

- Football League Second Division: 1919–20
- FA Cup: 1920–21

== Bibliography ==
- Goodwin, Bob (1992). The Spurs Alphabet. ACL & Polar Publishing (UK) Ltd. ISBN 0-9514862-8-4.
