= Peter McWilliam =

Scottish footballer (1879–1951)

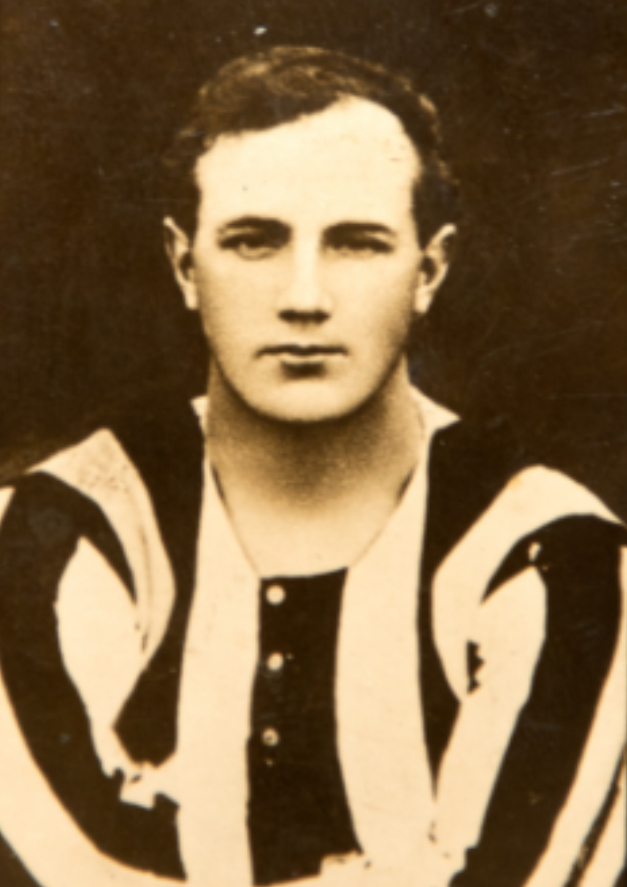

Personal information
- Date of birth: 21 September 1879
- Place of birth: Inverness, Scotland
- Date of death: 1 October 1951 (aged 72)
- Place of death: Redcar, England
- Position: Left-half

Senior career*
Years	Team	Apps	(Gls)
1900–1902	Inverness Thistle		
1902–1911	Newcastle United	199	(11)

International career
1905–1911	Scotland	8	(0)

Managerial career
- 1912–1927: Tottenham Hotspur
- 1927–1934: Middlesbrough
- 1938–1942: Tottenham Hotspur
- * Club domestic league appearances and goals

Peter McWilliam (21 September 1879 – 1 October 1951) was a Scottish footballer who played at left-half for Inverness Thistle, Newcastle United and Scotland. He won every domestic trophy during his nine years with Newcastle United.

He went on to manage Tottenham Hotspur on two occasions as well as Middlesbrough. He was the longest serving manager at Tottenham (however, both his stints were interrupted by world wars, therefore he managed fewer years of normal football) and led Spurs to an FA Cup win in 1921, becoming the first man to win the competition as a player and a manager.

== Early and personal life ==
McWilliam was born 21 September 1879 in Argyle Street, Inverness, the fourth child of six to Peter McWilliam (1851–1914) and Jane Neish (1852–1885). His father was a grocer's porter and the family had previously moved to Inverness (where he was a neighbour of future teammate for club and country, Andy McCombie) from Forgue, Aberdeenshire.

In 1905, while a player for Newcastle United, he married Florence Woof (1885–1970), a woman from Redcar, Yorkshire. They moved to this locality shortly afterwards and had four children, Peter Neish, Elizabeth Jean, Florence Margaret, David John. McWilliam died 1 October 1951 in Redcar and is buried in the nearby Kirkleatham cemetery.

== Playing career ==
McWilliam started his playing career at Inverness Thistle and remained with them for two years before starting a very successful period at Newcastle United between 1902 and 1911. He played 241 games, scoring 12 goals from the left half position. He won multiple honours with Newcastle, being part of the 1904–05, 1905–06 and 1908–09 Football League Championship sides and was an FA Cup Finalist in 1905, 1906 and 1908. In 1910 he won an FA Cup winner's medal. He was also capped eight times by Scotland. The football world knew him as "Peter the Great", and he was hugely popular with the Geordie fans.

=== International ===
He won 8 caps for Scotland, which included captaining the national team. However, his playing career came to an end following a serious knee injury sustained in a Home International Championship match against Wales on 7 March 1911.

== Managerial career ==
He managed Tottenham Hotspur for two spells between which he was manager at Middlesbrough. He was first appointed manager of Tottenham on 21 December 1912, and took up his position on 1 January 1913. In his first spell at Tottenham he was initially unsuccessful, and the club finished bottom of Division One the end of the 1914–15 season when football was suspended due to the First World War. When football resumed after the war, he steered the team back to Division One, and through one of its successful periods. This included the Second Division Title in 1920 and following promotion winning the FA Cup in 1921 a Charity Shield at the start of the next season, and runners up in the First Division in 1922.

For the next five seasons, Spurs finished mid-table. In 1927 he left Spurs to manage Middlesbrough having been enticed by an offer of a £1,500 salary per annum. Although he enjoyed some success at the club over five seasons he never gained the full popularity of the fans. In 1934, he returned to London briefly as a chief scout for Arsenal, having declined their offer to manage them.

In 1938, McWilliam returned to manage Tottenham once again, and started to rebuild the team in an attempt to lift them out of the Second Division. He promoted many younger players to the first team from the 'nursery side' at Northfleet, including Bill Nicholson. However, his second stint at Tottenham was again interrupted by a World War, and the war effectively brought his managerial career to an end as he returned to the North-East in 1942. By the time the war ended, he decided that he would be too old to be a football manager and retired from management.

== Legacy ==
Arthur Rowe, who was a player under McWilliam and later developed the "push and run" style of play, would credit McWilliam for learning to play a quick passing style of game that became known as the Spurs Way that found its best expression under Bill Nicholson. McWilliam himself learnt the possession-based football from Robert Smyth McColl when he was at Newcastle, and this style of play can be traced further back to Scottish players of the 19th century. Vic Buckingham, another player who started playing under McWilliam, was also influenced by McWilliam's ideas of a possession-based game and pass-and-move style and developed it further. Buckingham would later manage both Ajax and Barcelona, and has been credited as an influence in the development of the style of play known as Total Football.

== Honours ==
=== As a player ===
Newcastle United

- Football League First Division: 1904-05, 1905-06, 1908-09
- FA Cup: 1909-10

=== As a manager ===
Tottenham Hotspur

- FA Cup: 1920–21
- Football League Second Division: 1919–20
- FA Charity Shield: 1921

Middlesbrough

- Football League Second Division: 1928–29

== See also ==
- List of Scotland national football team captains
