= 1921 FA Cup final =

- Official match programme
- Event: 1920–21 FA Cup
Tottenham Hotspur	Wolverhampton Wanderers
1	0
- Date: 23 April 1921
- Venue: Stamford Bridge, London
- Referee: J. Davies (Rainhill)
- Attendance: 72,805

The 1921 FA Cup final was contested by Tottenham Hotspur and Wolverhampton Wanderers, who at the time were a Football League Second Division club, at Stamford Bridge. Spurs won by a single goal, scored by Jimmy Dimmock, eight minutes into the second half. The cup was presented to Tottenham Hotspur by King George V.

George Edmonds, who played on the losing side, was the last surviving player from the game. He died in December 1989 at the age of 96.

== Route to the final ==
=== Tottenham Hotspur ===
Round	Opposition	Score	Venue
1st	Bristol Rovers	6–2	White Hart Lane (h)
2nd	Bradford City	4–0	White Hart Lane (h)
3rd	Southend United	4–1	The Kursaal (a)
Quarter-final	Aston Villa	1–0	White Hart Lane (h)
Semi-final	Preston North End	2–1	Hillsborough (n)

Tottenham's Cup run began with a comfortable 6–2 home win against Bristol Rovers, and they then beat Bradford City 4–0 with Jimmy Seed scoring a hat-trick. In the third round, Tottenham fell behind to Third Division Southend United, but Jimmy Cantrell equalised. Bert Smith then conceded a penalty, but Southend's Albert Fairclough missed and Tottenham scored three times in the second half to go through 4–1.

In the quarter-finals Tottenham faced the Cup holders Aston Villa, who had eliminated them at the same stage the previous year. On this occasion Tottenham reversed the scoreline to win 1–0, with the decisive goal scored in the first half by Jimmy Banks. In the semi-finals against another First Division team, Preston North End, at Hillsborough, Sheffield, Tottenham had two goals disallowed in the first half. Bert Bliss then scored twice and although Preston pulled a goal back late in the game when Tommy Clay scored an own goal, Tottenham held on to win 2–1 and reach the final.

=== Wolverhampton Wanderers ===
Round	Opposition	Score	Venue
1st	Stoke	3–2	Molineux (h)
2nd	Derby County	1–1	Baseball Ground (a)
(replay)	Derby County	1–0	Molineux (h)
3rd	Fulham	1–0	Craven Cottage (a)
Quarter-final	Everton	1–0	Goodison Park (a)
Semi-final	Cardiff City	0–0	Anfield (n)
(replay)	Cardiff City	3–1	Old Trafford (n)

== Pre-match ==
Tottenham's Scottish manager, Peter McWilliam, had been in the Newcastle United team that won the FA Cup in 1910 and lost three previous finals.

== Match ==
=== Match details ===
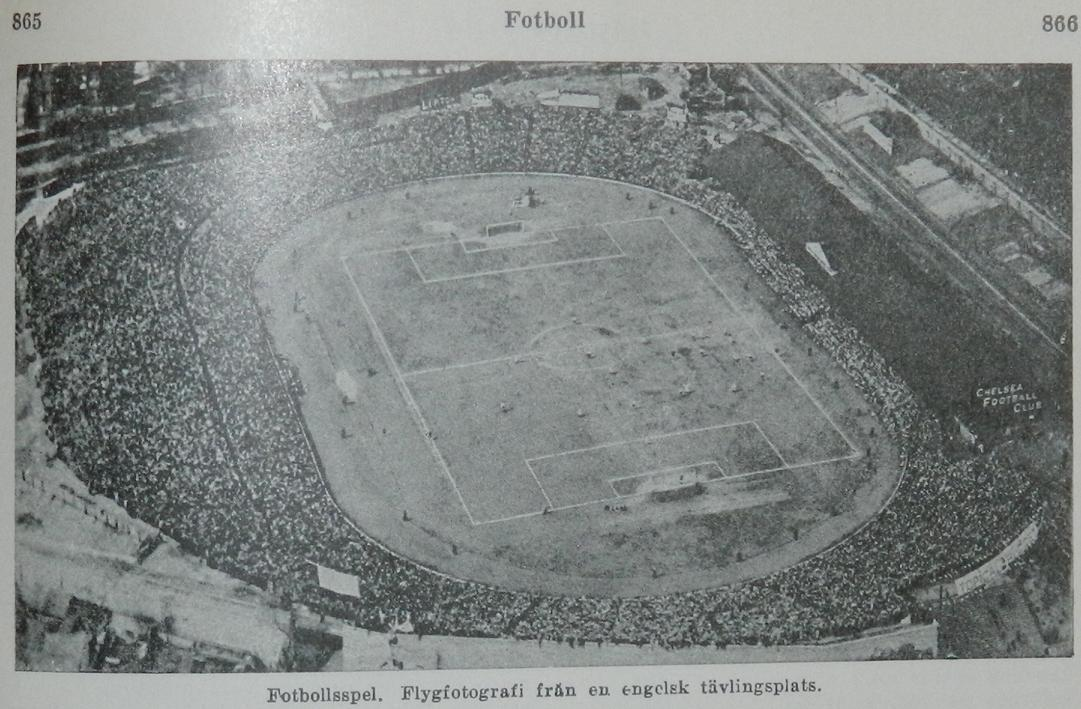
Stamford Bridge in the 1920s

23 April 1921

Tottenham Hotspur	1–0	Wolverhampton Wanderers
Dimmock 53'

Stamford Bridge, London
Attendance: 72,805
Referee: J. Davies (Rainhill)

Tottenham Hotspur	Wolverhampton Wanderers

GK	(Scotland) Alex Hunter
DF	(England) Tommy Clay
DF	(Scotland) Bob McDonald
MF	(England) Bert Smith
MF	(England) Charlie Walters
MF	(England) Arthur Grimsdell (c)
FW	(England) Jimmy Banks
FW	(England) Jimmy Seed
FW	(England) Jimmy Cantrell
FW	(England) Bert Bliss
FW	(England) Jimmy Dimmock
Manager:
(Scotland) Peter McWilliam

GK	(England) Noel George
DF	(England) Maurice Woodward
DF	(England) George Marshall
MF	(England) Val Gregory (c)
MF	(England) Joe Hodnett
MF	(England) Alf Riley
FW	(England) Tancy Lea
FW	(England) Frank Burrill
FW	(England) George Edmonds
FW	(England) Arthur Potts
FW	(England) Sammy Brooks
Manager:
(England) Jack Addenbrooke

== Post-match ==
Jimmy Seed went on to win the Cup as a manager with Charlton Athletic in 1947.

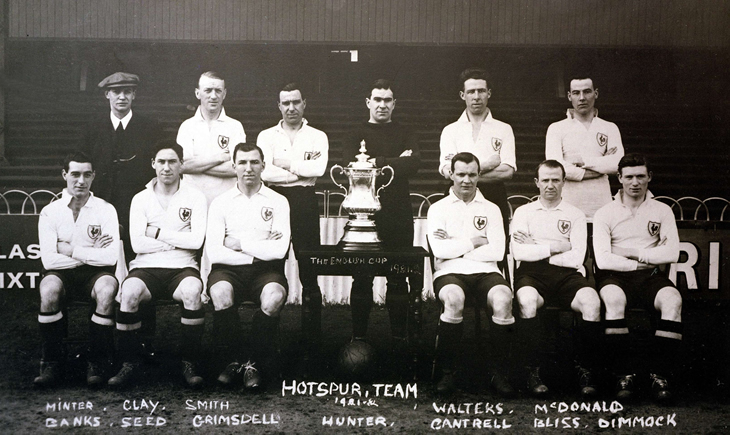
Players of Tottenham Hotspur posing with the Cup
