= Bobby Buckle =

English footballer

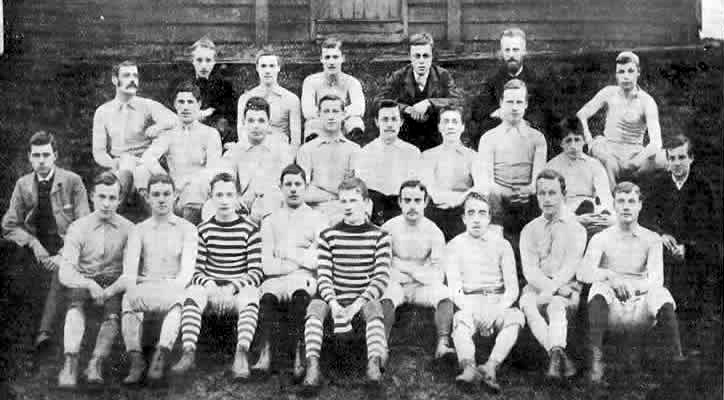
- Spurs team in 1885. Buckle bottom row second left

Personal information
- Full name: Robert Buckle
- Date of birth: 17 October 1868
- Place of birth: Tottenham
- Date of death: 1959 (aged 90–91)

Senior career*
Years	Team	Apps	(Gls)
1882–1895	Hotspur	53	(25)
- * Club domestic league appearances and goals

Robert Buckle (17 October 1868 – April 1959) was an English footballer who, as a schoolboy, founded the Hotspur Football Club in 1882, which later became Tottenham Hotspur Football Club.

== Career ==
Buckle was born on 17 October 1868 to parents William and Emma Ebenezer at 5 Penshurst Road (originally called Stanford Street) just off White Hart Lane in Tottenham. In 1881 Buckle entered the prestigious Tottenham Grammar School at the age of 12. With local friends in the area and from the school the group went on to form Hotspur Cricket Club. After the cricket season finished Buckle along with his fellow acquaintances, under a lamp post on Tottenham High Road went on to form Hotspur Football Club, thus becoming a founding member. Buckle was also elected the first-ever captain of the club at its inception, just seven weeks before his 14th birthday. He was featured in the club's first known line-up and is Tottenham's first recorded goalscorer on 20 October 1883.

He served in varying capacities and being involved in many of the red letter events of the club's early history. He served on the committee from 1884, was appointed honorary secretary and treasurer in 1890 and was elected to the first board of directors in 1898.

Just two years later, at the turn of the century in 1900, Buckle resigned from the board after overseeing the adoption of professional status, the formation of the Limited Company and the move to White Hart Lane.

During his Tottenham career between the years of 1882 and 1895 he has a recorded 25 goals in 53 appearances although it is likely that this number is higher with unrecorded games taken into consideration.

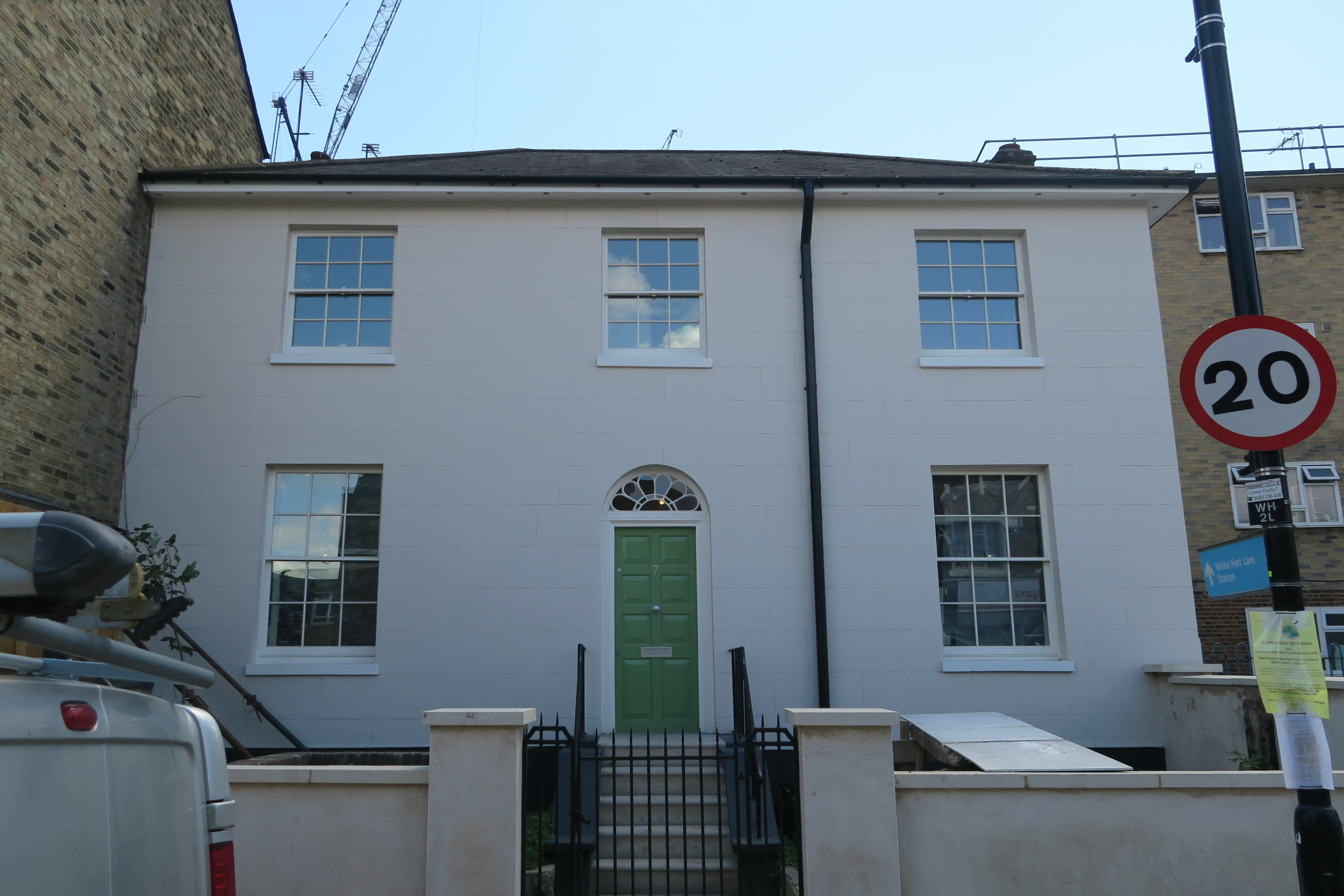
White Cottage at White Hart Lane

As work began on the Northumberland Development Project to build Tottenham Hotspur a new ground in 2017, a group of fans began campaigning for a blue plaque to be mounted on the house in White Hart Lane where Buckle lived when he helped found the club and which became its first postal address.

== Bibliography ==
- Soar, Phil (1995). Tottenham Hotspur The Official Illustrated History 1882–1995. Hamlyn. ISBN 0-600-58706-1.
- South, Christopher (2020). The Authorised Biography Of Bobby Buckle. Bobby Buckle Matters Partnership. ISBN 978-1838053802.
