= Jimmy Dimmock =

English footballer (1900–1972)

- Dimmock in 1921

Personal information
- Full name: James Henry Dimmock
- Date of birth: 5 December 1900
- Place of birth: Edmonton, England
- Date of death: 23 December 1972 (aged 72)
- Place of death: Edmonton, England
- Height: 5 ft 10 in (1.78 m)
- Position: Outside left

Senior career*
Years	Team	Apps	(Gls)
1919–1930	Tottenham Hotspur	400	(100)
1931–1932	Thames	37	(12)
1932–1934	Clapton Orient	18	(3)
1934–1936	Ashford Town (Kent)		

International career
1921–1926	England	3	(0)
- * Club domestic league appearances and goals

James Henry Dimmock (5 December 1900 – 23 December 1972) was a footballer who scored the winning goal for Tottenham Hotspur in the 1921 FA Cup Final. He played as an outside left and became the fans' favourite with his mazy runs and trickery, and also won three caps for England.

== Early years ==
Dimmock was born in Edmonton on 5 December 1900 where he attended Montague Rd School. He played junior football for Park Avenue and Gothic Works before signing as an amateur for Tottenham Hotspur in 1916. During the First World War, he played for Clapton Orient and Edmonton Ramblers. Dimmock served as a gunner in the First World War with the Royal Field Artillery.

== Professional career ==
Dimmock turned professional with Tottenham Hotspur in May 1919, and his first match was at Lincoln City on 4 October.

He holds a unique place in the history of Tottenham Hotspur by being the only player in the club's history to play 400 league games and score 100 league goals. He also remains (at 20 years 139 days) the youngest Tottenham player to appear in an FA Cup Final.

Undoubtedly his most memorable season was the 1920–21 season. Dimmock made his international debut against Scotland on 9 April 1921 at the age of 20 years and 125 days to become the youngest Spurs player (at that time) to play for England, and a fortnight later he appeared for Spurs in the FA Cup Final against Wolverhampton Wanderers at Stamford Bridge. Despite sustaining an injury early in the game, he scored the only goal of the game to secure a second FA Cup triumph for Tottenham. Surprisingly, he had to wait five years to gain his 2 further international caps, against Wales and Belgium in 1926.

When he was released by Spurs in 1931 he had scored 100 goals in 400 league games, and 12 in 38 FA Cup matches.

He subsequently played one season for Thames Association FC and two seasons for Clapton Orient.

== Later years ==
In 1934, he played for Ashford Town (Kent) in the Kent League. In the same year he had a trial with Tunbridge Wells Rangers before retiring from the game in 1936.

He worked for a time in the road haulage industry but suffered from poor health later in life, eventually losing both legs. He died on 23 December 1972 at the North Middlesex Hospital, Edmonton, London.

== Career statistics ==
=== International ===
Appearances and goals by national team and year
National team	Year	Apps	Goals
England	1921	1	0
England	1926	2	0
Total		3	0

== Honours ==
Tottenham Hotspur

- FA Cup: 1920–21
