= Tottenham Hotspur F.C. =

Association football club in England

Tottenham Hotspur
- Full name: Tottenham Hotspur Football Club
- Nickname: The Lilywhites
- Short name: Spurs
- Founded: 5 September 1882; 144 years ago, as Hotspur F.C.
- Ground: Tottenham Hotspur Stadium
- Capacity: 62,850
- Owner: ENIC International Ltd. (86.58%)
- Non-executive chairman: Peter Charrington
- Head coach: Roberto De Zerbi
- League: Premier League
- 2025–26: Premier League, 17th of 20
- Website: tottenhamhotspur.com
| Home colours | Away colours | Third colours |

Tottenham Hotspur Football Club, commonly referred to as simply Tottenham (/ˈtɒtənəm/ TOT-ən-əm) or Spurs, (Note: The club itself has stated that it should always be called "Tottenham Hotspur" or "Spurs", as Tottenham is the area of London and not the name of the club.) is a professional football club based in Tottenham, North London, England. They compete in the Premier League, the top tier of English football. Since 2019, the team have played their home matches in the Tottenham Hotspur Stadium. It was built on the same site as their previous home, White Hart Lane, which was demolished in 2017.

Founded in 1882, Tottenham Hotspur's emblem is a cockerel standing upon a football, with the Latin motto Audere est Facere ("to dare is to do"). The team have traditionally worn white shirts and navy blue shorts as their home kit since the 1898–99 season. Their training ground is on Hotspur Way in Bulls Cross, Enfield. After its inception, Tottenham won the FA Cup for the first time in 1901, the only non-League club to do so since the formation of the Football League in 1888. Tottenham was the first club in the 20th century to achieve the League and FA Cup Double, winning both competitions in the 1960–61 season. After successfully defending the FA Cup in 1962, in 1963 they became the first British club to win a UEFA club competition – the European Cup Winners' Cup. They were also the inaugural winners of the UEFA Cup in 1972, becoming the first British club to win two different major European trophies. They collected at least one major trophy in each of the six decades from the 1950s to 2000s, an achievement matched only by Manchester United.

In domestic football, Spurs have won two league titles, eight FA Cups, four League Cups, and seven FA Community Shields. In European football, they have won one European Cup Winners' Cup and three UEFA Cup/Europa League titles. Tottenham were also runners-up in the 2018–19 UEFA Champions League. They have a long-standing rivalry with nearby club Arsenal, with whom they contest the North London derby, as well as a contested rivalry with Chelsea. Tottenham is owned by ENIC Group, which purchased the club in 2001. The club was estimated to be worth £2.6 billion ($3.2 billion) in 2024, and it was the ninth-highest-earning football club in the world, with an annual revenue for season 2024–25 of €672.6M (£585.56M), as ranked by accountancy firm Deloitte.

== History ==
=== Formation and early years (1882–1908) ===
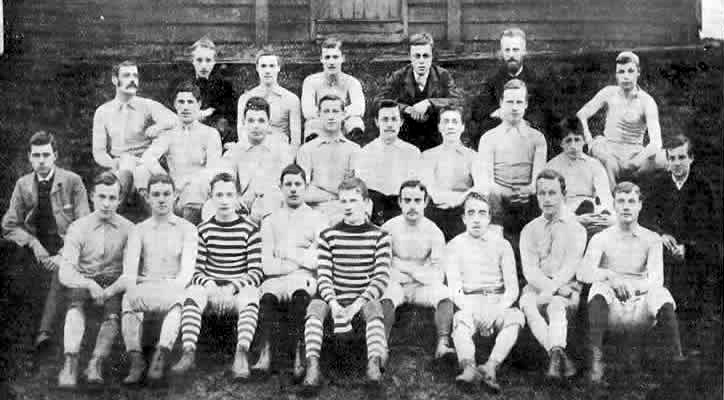
Spurs' first and second teams in 1885. Club president John Ripsher top row second right, team captain Jack Jull middle row fourth left, Bobby Buckle bottom row second left.

Originally named Hotspur Football Club, the club was formed on 5 September 1882 by a group of schoolboys led by Bobby Buckle. They were members of the Hotspur Cricket Club and the football club was formed to play sports during the winter months. The club was based in the Northumberland Park area of Tottenham, named for the Dukes of Northumberland, and hence took its name from Harry Hotspur, a famous member of the Northumberland family.

A year later the boys sought help with the club from John Ripsher, the Bible class teacher at All Hallows Church, who became the first president of the club and its treasurer. Ripsher helped and supported the boys through the club's formative years, reorganising the club and finding premises for it. In April 1884 the club was renamed "Tottenham Hotspur Football Club" to avoid confusion with another London club named Hotspur, whose post had been mistakenly delivered to North London. Nicknames for the club include "Spurs" and "the Lilywhites".

Initially, the North London side played games between themselves and friendly matches against other local clubs. The first recorded match took place on 30 September 1882 against a local team named the Radicals, which Hotspur lost 2–0. The team entered their first cup competition in the London Association Cup, and won 5–2 in their first competitive match on 17 October 1885 against a company's works team called St Albans. The club's fixtures began to attract the interest of the local community and attendances at its home matches increased. In 1892, they played for the first time in a league, the short-lived Southern Alliance.

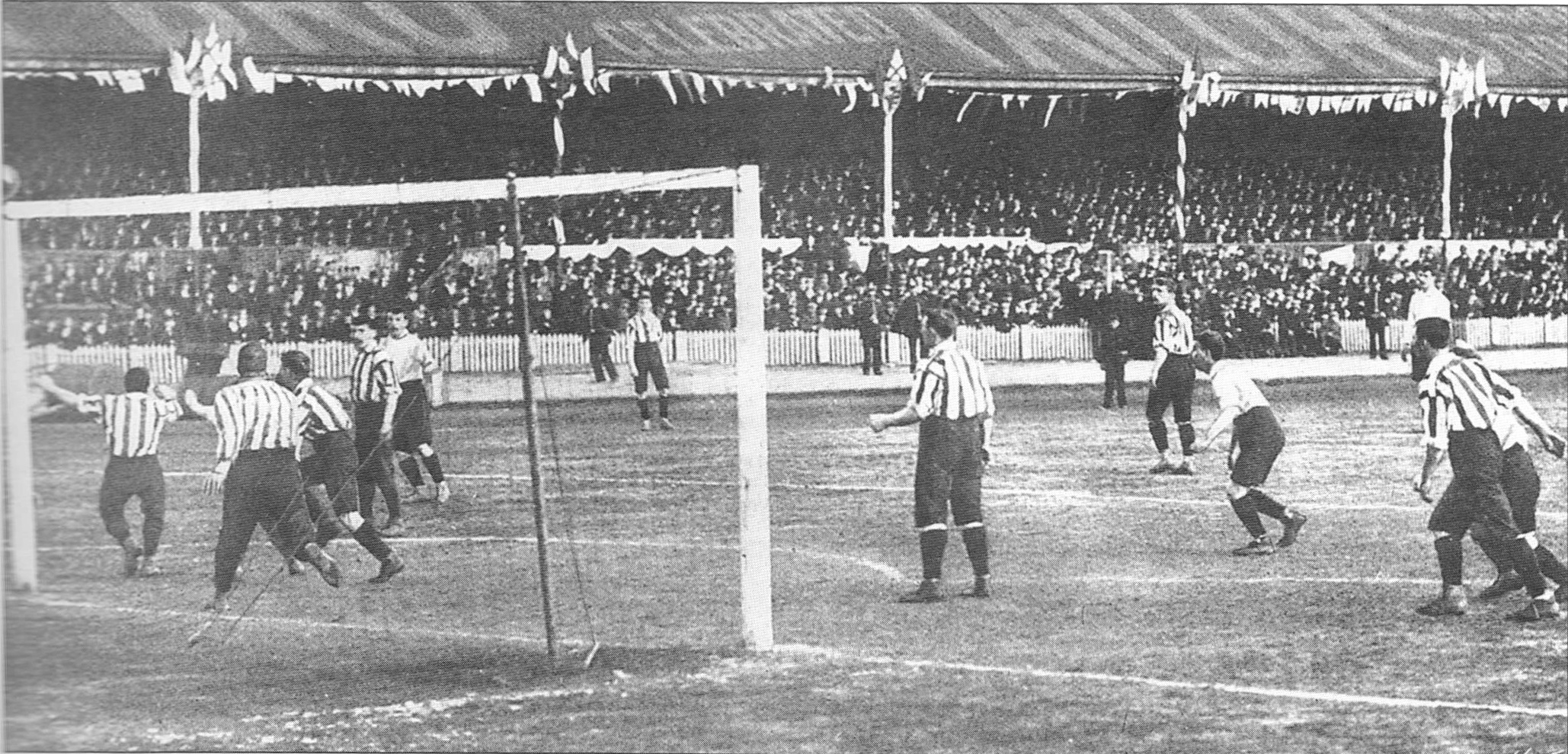
Sandy Brown (unseen) scoring the third goal for Tottenham Hotspur in the 1901 FA Cup Final replay against Sheffield United

The club turned professional on 20 December 1895 and, in the summer of 1896, was admitted to Division One of the Southern League (the third tier at the time). On 2 March 1898, the club also became a limited company, the Tottenham Hotspur Football and Athletic Company. Soon after, Frank Brettell became the first ever manager of Spurs, and he signed John Cameron, who took over as player-manager when Brettell left a year later. Cameron would have a significant impact on Spurs, helping the club win its first trophy, the Southern League title in the 1899–1900 season. The following year Spurs won the 1901 FA Cup by beating Sheffield United 3–1 in a replay of the final, after the first game ended in a 2–2 draw. In doing so they became the only non-League club to achieve the feat since the formation of The Football League in 1888.

=== Early decades in the Football League (1908–1958) ===
In 1908, the club was elected into the Football League Second Division and won promotion to the First Division in their first season, finishing runners-up. In 1912, Peter McWilliam became manager; Tottenham finished bottom of the league at the end of the 1914–15 season when football was suspended due to the First World War. Spurs were relegated to the Second Division on the resumption of league football after the war, but quickly returned to the First Division as Second Division champions of the 1919–20 season.

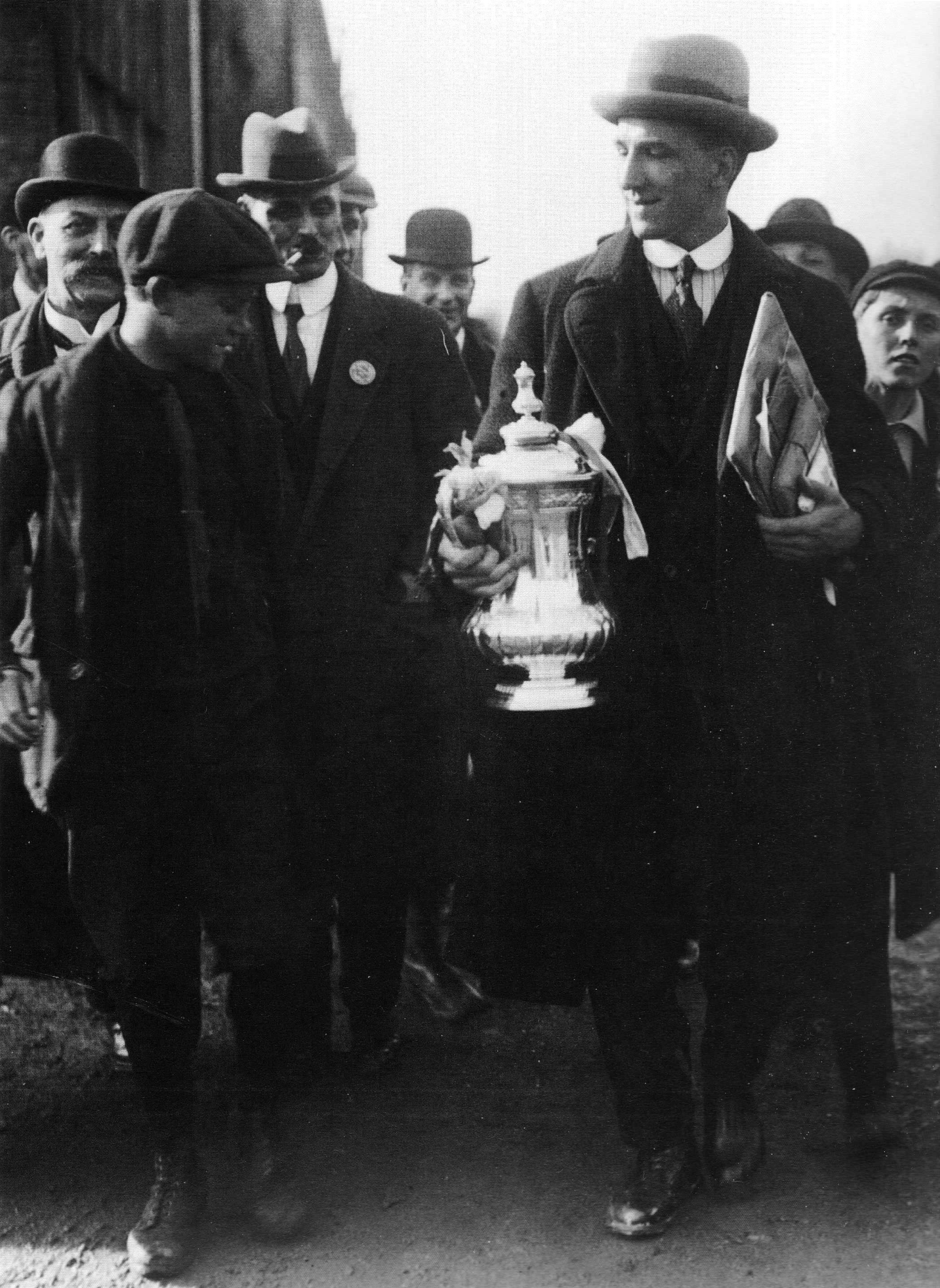
Spurs captain Arthur Grimsdell displaying the cup to fans on Tottenham High Road after the 1921 final

On 23 April 1921, McWilliam guided Spurs to their second FA Cup win, beating Wolverhampton Wanderers 1–0 in the final. After coming second to Liverpool in the league in 1922, they would finish mid-table in the next five seasons, being relegated in the 1927–28 season after McWilliam left. For most of the 1930s and 1940s, Spurs languished in the Second Division, apart from a brief return to the top flight in the 1933–34 and 1934–35 seasons.

Former Spurs player Arthur Rowe became manager in 1949. Rowe developed a style of play, known as "push and run", that proved to be successful in his early years as manager. He took the team back to the First Division after finishing top of the Second Division in the 1949–50 season. In his second season in charge, Tottenham won their first ever top-tier league championship title when they finished top of the First Division for the 1950–51 season. Rowe resigned in April 1955 due to a stress-induced illness from managing the club. Before he left, he signed one of Spurs' most celebrated players, Danny Blanchflower, who won the FWA Footballer of the Year twice while at Tottenham.

=== Bill Nicholson and the glory years (1958–1974) ===
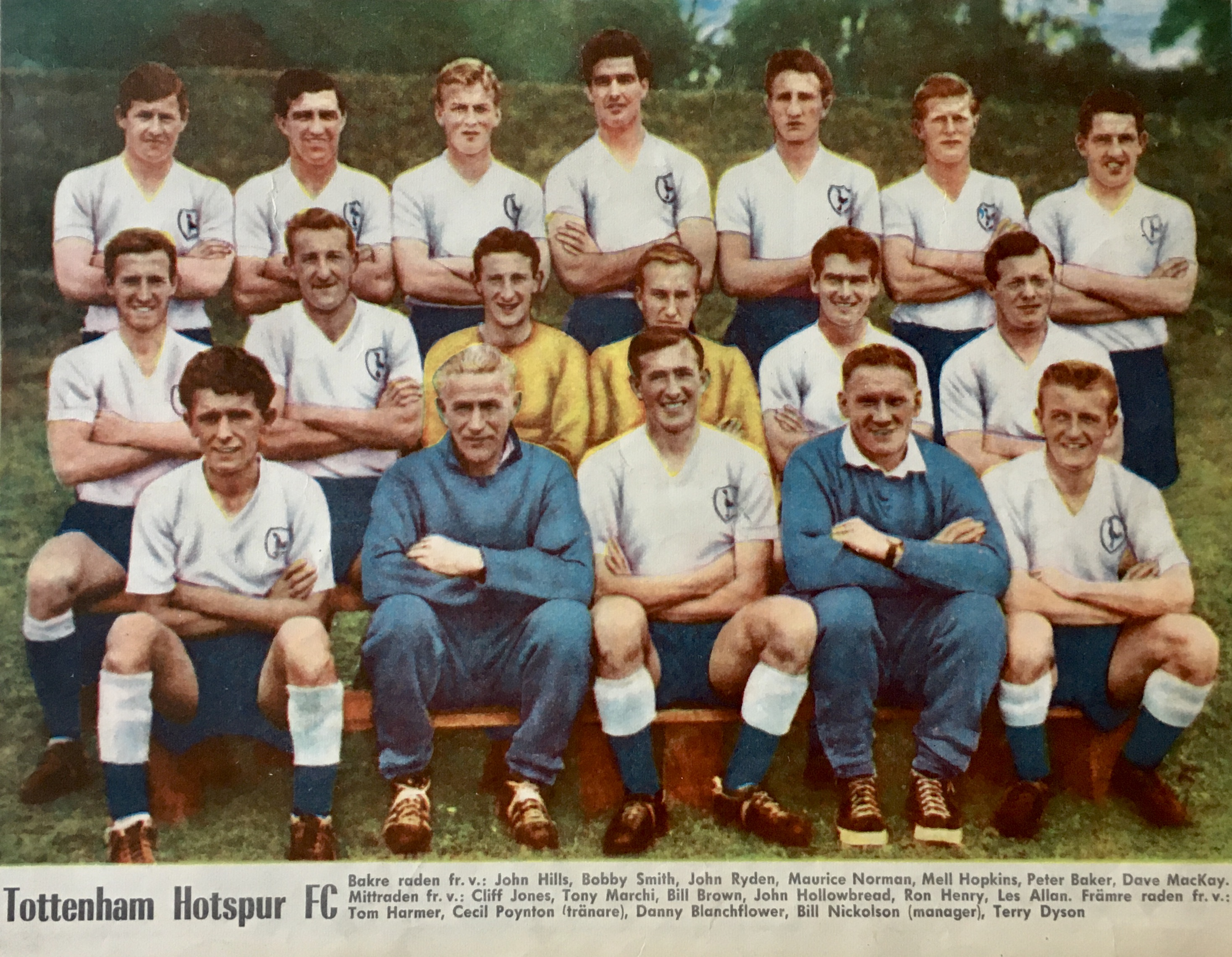
Tottenham Hotspur in 1960 with Danny Blanchflower, Dave Mackay, Bill Brown, Bobby Smith, Cliff Jones among others in the team with Bill Nicholson as manager

Bill Nicholson took over as manager in October 1958. He became the club's most successful manager, guiding the team to major trophy success three seasons in a row in the early 1960s: the Double in 1961, the FA Cup in 1962 and the Cup Winners' Cup in 1963. Nicholson signed Dave Mackay and John White in 1959, two influential players of the Double-winning team, and Jimmy Greaves in 1961, the most prolific goal-scorer in the history of the top tier of English football.

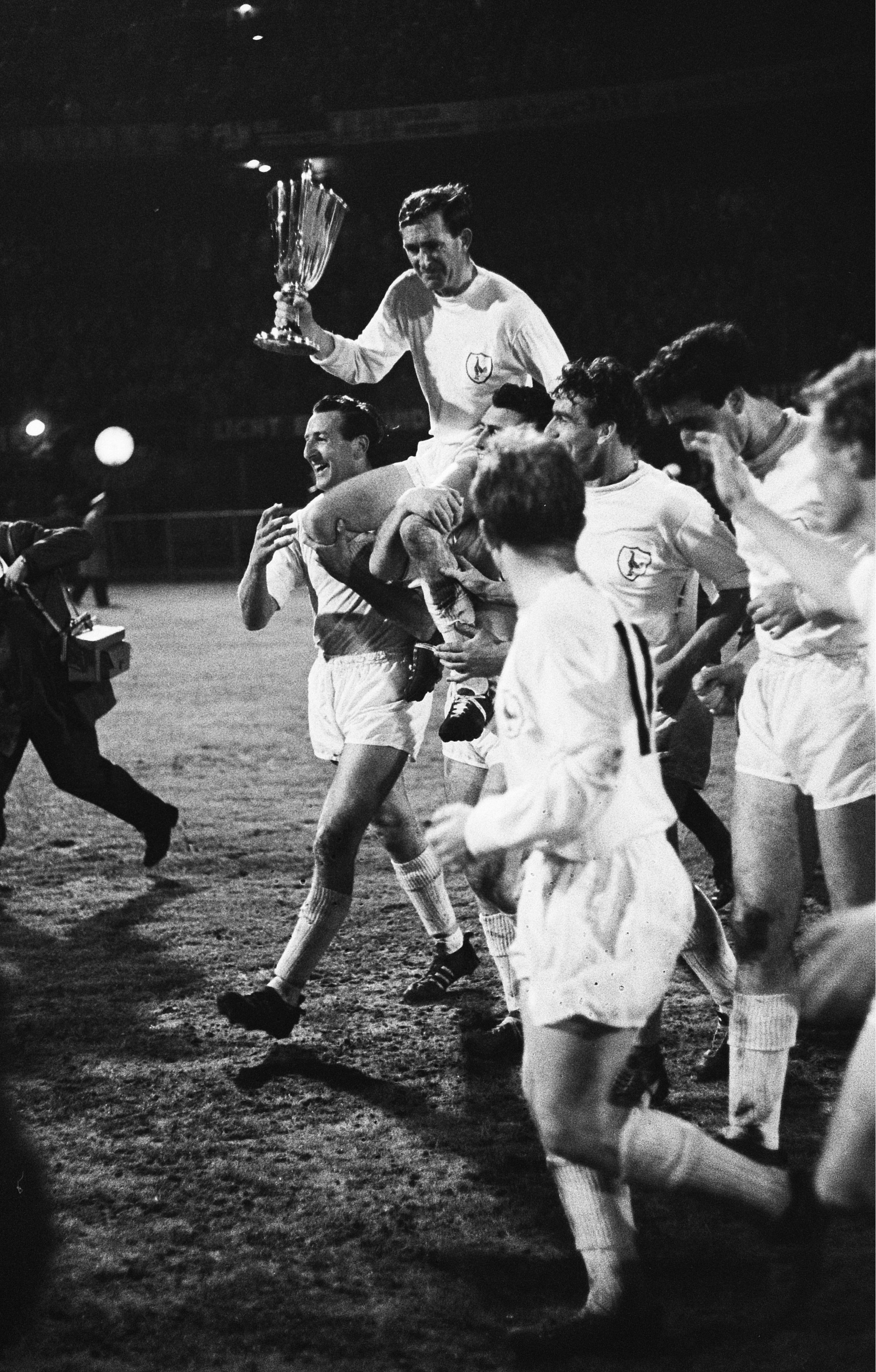
Danny Blanchflower with the UEFA Cup Winners' Cup trophy in 1963

The 1960–61 season started with a run of 11 wins, followed by a draw and another four wins, at that time the best ever start by any club in the top flight of English football. The title was won on 17 April 1961 when they beat the eventual runner-up Sheffield Wednesday at home 2–1, with three more games still to play. The Double was achieved when Spurs won 2–0 against Leicester City in the final of the 1960–61 FA Cup. It was the first Double of the 20th century, and the first since Aston Villa achieved the feat in 1897. The next year Spurs won their consecutive FA Cup after beating Burnley in the 1962 FA Cup final.

On 15 May 1963, Tottenham became the first British team to win a European trophy by winning the 1962–63 European Cup Winners' Cup when they beat Atlético Madrid 5–1 in the final. Spurs also became the first British team to win two different European trophies when they won the 1971–72 UEFA Cup with a rebuilt team that included Martin Chivers, Pat Jennings, and Steve Perryman. They had also won the FA Cup in 1967, two League Cups (in 1971 and 1973), as well as a second place league finish (1962–63) and runners-up in the 1973–74 UEFA Cup. In total, Nicholson won eight major trophies in his 16 years at the club as manager.

=== Burkinshaw to Venables (1974–1992) ===
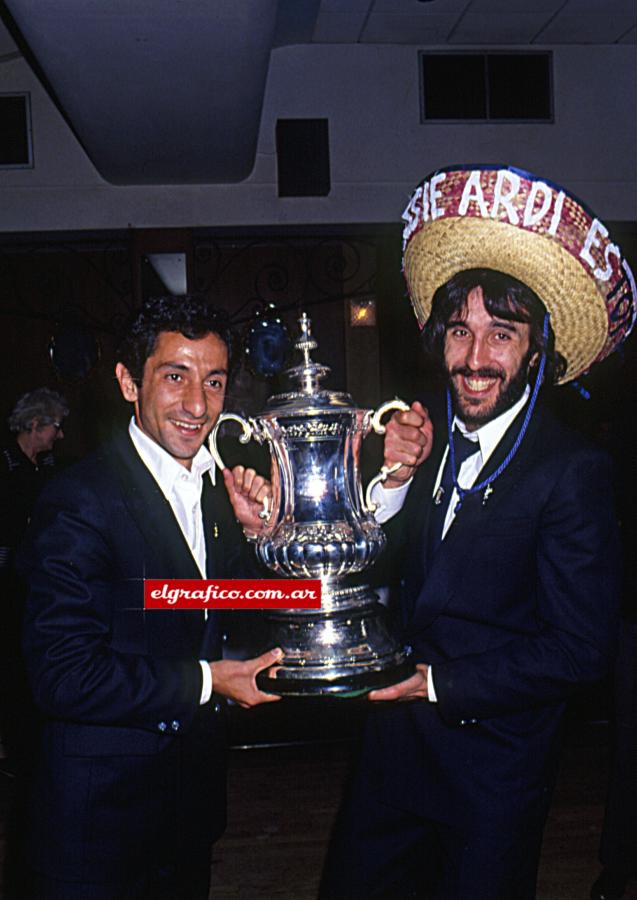
Osvaldo Ardiles and Ricardo Villa holding the FA Cup trophy won in 1981

Spurs went into a period of decline after the successes of the early 1970s, and Nicholson resigned after a poor start to the 1974–75 season. The team was then relegated at the end of the 1976–77 season with Keith Burkinshaw as manager. Burkinshaw quickly returned the club to the top flight, building a team that included Glenn Hoddle as well as two Argentinians, Osvaldo Ardiles and Ricardo Villa, which was unusual as players from outside the British Isles were rare at that time. The team that Burkinshaw rebuilt went on to win the FA Cup in 1981 and 1982 and the UEFA Cup in 1984.

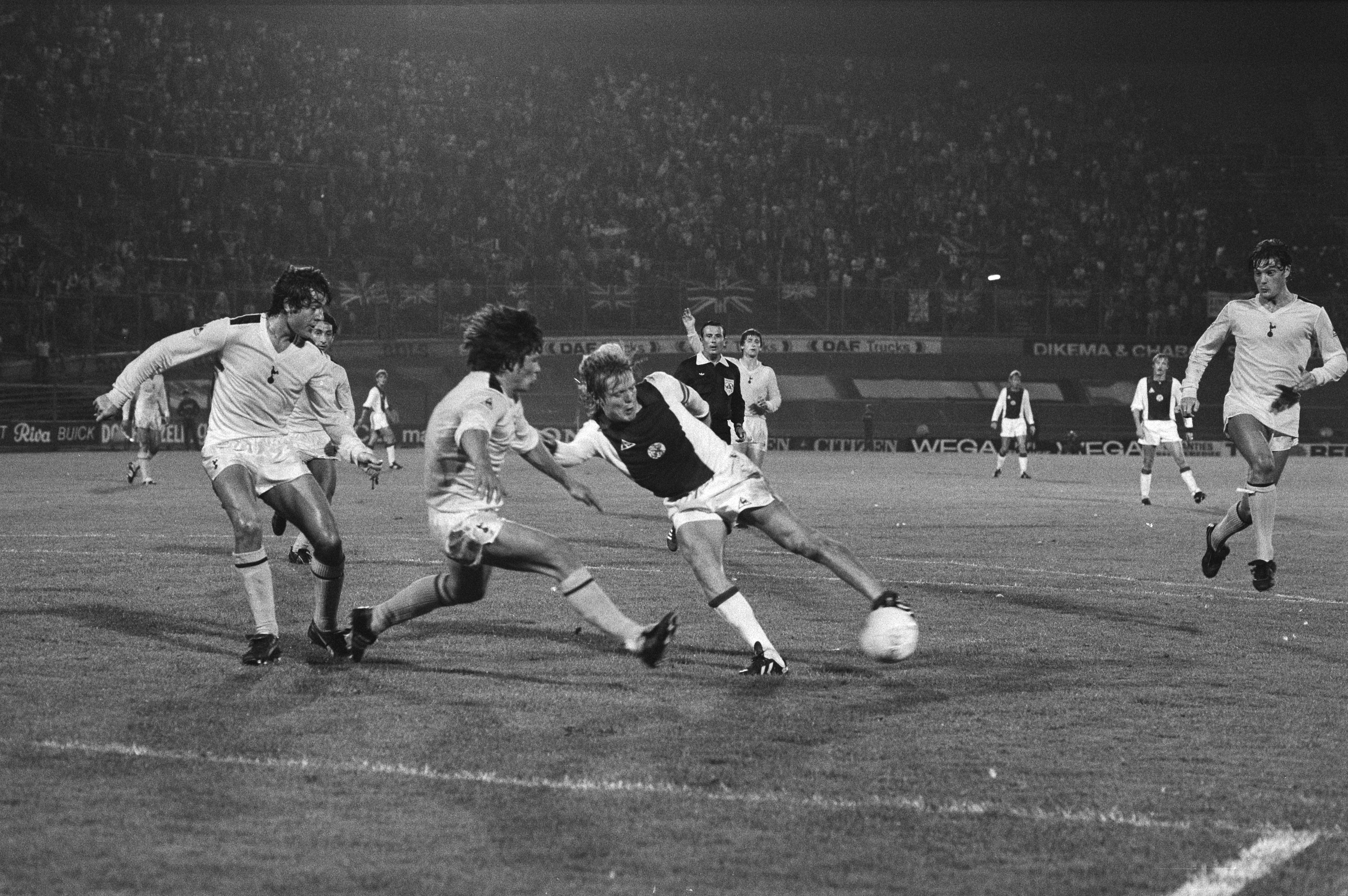
Ajax playing against Tottenham in the European Cup Winners' Cup in 1981. Notable Spurs players of the early 1980s include Steve Perryman, Osvaldo Ardiles, and Glenn Hoddle.

The 1980s was a period of change that began with a new phase of redevelopment at White Hart Lane, as well as a change of directors. Irving Scholar took over the club and moved it in a more commercial direction, the beginning of the transformation of English football clubs into commercial enterprises. Debt at the club would again lead to a change in the boardroom, and Terry Venables teamed up with businessman Alan Sugar in June 1991 to take control of Tottenham Hotspur plc. Venables, who had become manager in 1987, signed players such as Paul Gascoigne and Gary Lineker. Under Venables, Spurs won the 1990–91 FA Cup, making them the first club to win eight FA Cups.

=== Premier League football (1992–present) ===
Tottenham was one of the five clubs that pushed for the founding of the Premier League, created with the approval of The Football Association, replacing the Football League First Division as the highest division of English football. In February 2001, Sugar sold his shareholding in Spurs to ENIC Sports plc, run by Joe Lewis and Daniel Levy, and stepped down as chairman. Lewis and Levy would eventually own 85% of the club, with Levy responsible for the running of the club. Despite a succession of managers and players such as Teddy Sheringham, Jürgen Klinsmann and David Ginola, for a long period in the Premier League until the late 2000s, Spurs finished mid-table most seasons with few trophies won. They won the League Cup in 1999 under George Graham, and again in 2008 under Juande Ramos. Performance improved under Harry Redknapp with players such as Gareth Bale and Luka Modrić, and the club finished in the top five in the early 2010s.

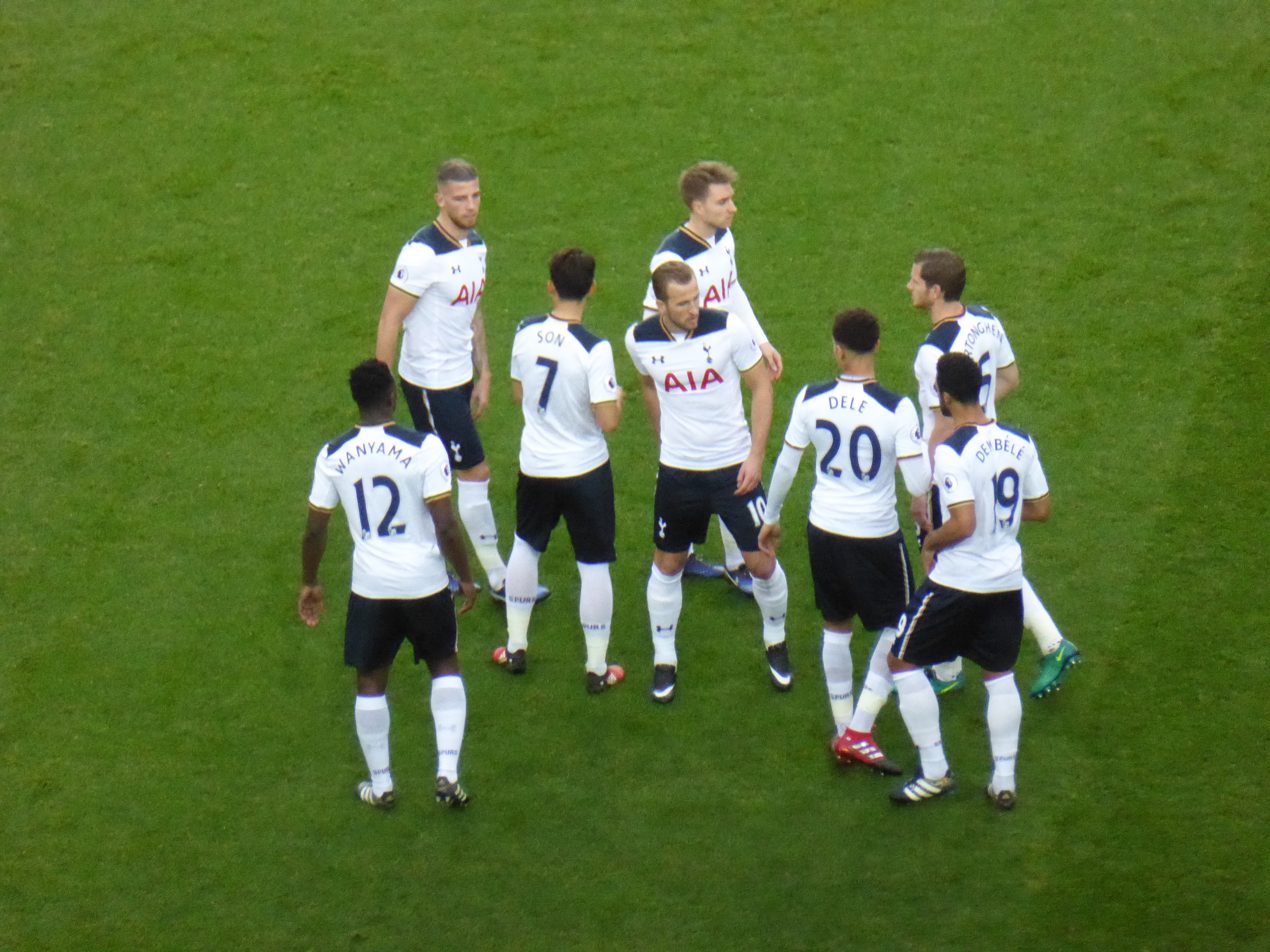
Spurs players of the 2016–17 season, including Harry Kane, Dele Alli, Son Heung-min, Christian Eriksen, Victor Wanyama, and Jan Vertonghen

After Redknapp left, Mauricio Pochettino was appointed head coach, who was in the role between 2014 and 2019. Under Pochettino, with new stars such as academy graduate Harry Kane and Korean import Son Heung-min, Tottenham solidified their position as part of an emerging group of clubs known as the Big Six. Spurs finished second in the 2016–17 season, their highest league finish since the 1962–63 season, and advanced to the UEFA Champions League final in 2019, the club's first, where they ultimately lost to Liverpool 2–0. The club's home games during the last few seasons of Pochettino's tenure were played at Wembley Stadium while the new Tottenham Hotspur Stadium was constructed.

Pochettino was dismissed after a poor start to the 2019–20 season and was replaced by José Mourinho until April 2021, and Nuno Espírito Santo for just four months. The next manager, Antonio Conte, guided Spurs to fourth during the 2021–22 season and back to a Champions League place, but he departed the club by mutual agreement in March 2023. In February 2023, Harry Kane displaced Jimmy Greaves as the club's all-time record goalscorer before leaving Spurs at the end of the season for Bayern Munich.

Ange Postecoglou took over as head coach on 1 July 2023 and the club qualified for the 2024–25 UEFA Europa League after a fifth-place finish in the Premier League. The next season, the club ended their 17-year trophy drought by beating Manchester United 1–0 in the 2025 Europa League final. However, their 17th place finish domestically was their worst of the Premier League era, resulting in Postecoglou's sacking. Two managers, Thomas Frank and Igor Tudor, were hired and fired in quick succession with Tudor lasting just 44 days, until Roberto De Zerbi was brought in and ensured Spurs narrowly avoided relegation with a 17th place finish for the second successive season.

== Stadiums ==
=== Early grounds ===
Spurs played their early matches on public land at the Park Lane end of Tottenham Marshes, where they had to mark out and prepare their own pitch. Occasionally fights broke out on the marshes in disputes with other teams over the use of the ground. The first Spurs game reported by the local press took place on Tottenham Marshes on 6 October 1883 against Brownlow Rovers, which Spurs won 9–0. It was at this ground that, in 1887, Spurs first played the team that would later become their arch rivals, Arsenal (then known as Royal Arsenal), leading 2–1 until the match was called off due to poor light after the away team arrived late.

Northumberland Park, 28 January 1899, Spurs vs Newton Heath (later renamed Manchester United)

As they played on public parkland, the club could not charge admission fees and, while the number of spectators grew to a few thousand, it yielded no gate receipts. In 1888, the club rented a pitch between numbers 69 and 75 Northumberland Park at a cost of £17 per annum, where spectators were charged 3d a game, raised to 6d for cup ties. The first game at the Park was played on 13 October 1888, a reserve match that yielded gate receipts of 17 shillings. The first stand with just over 100 seats and changing rooms underneath was built at the ground for the 1894–95 season at a cost of £60. However, the stand was blown down a few weeks later and had to be repaired. In April 1898, 14,000 fans turned up to watch Spurs play Woolwich Arsenal. Spectators climbed on the roof of the refreshment stand for a better view of the match. The stand collapsed, causing a few injuries. As Northumberland Park could no longer cope with the larger crowds, Spurs looked for a larger ground and moved to the White Hart Lane site in 1899.

=== White Hart Lane ===
First game at White Hart Lane, Spurs vs Notts County for the official opening on 4 September 1899

The White Hart Lane ground was built on an unused plant nursery owned by the Charrington Brewery and located behind a public house named the White Hart on Tottenham High Road (the road White Hart Lane actually lies a few hundred yards north of the main entrance). The ground was initially leased from Charringtons, and the stands they used at Northumberland Park were moved here, giving shelter for 2,500 spectators. Notts County were the first visitors to 'the Lane' in a friendly watched by 5,000 people and yielding £115 in receipts; Spurs won 4–1. Queens Park Rangers became the first competitive visitors to the ground and 11,000 people saw them lose 1–0 to Tottenham. In 1905, Tottenham raised enough money to buy the freehold to the land, as well as land at the northern (Paxton Road) end.

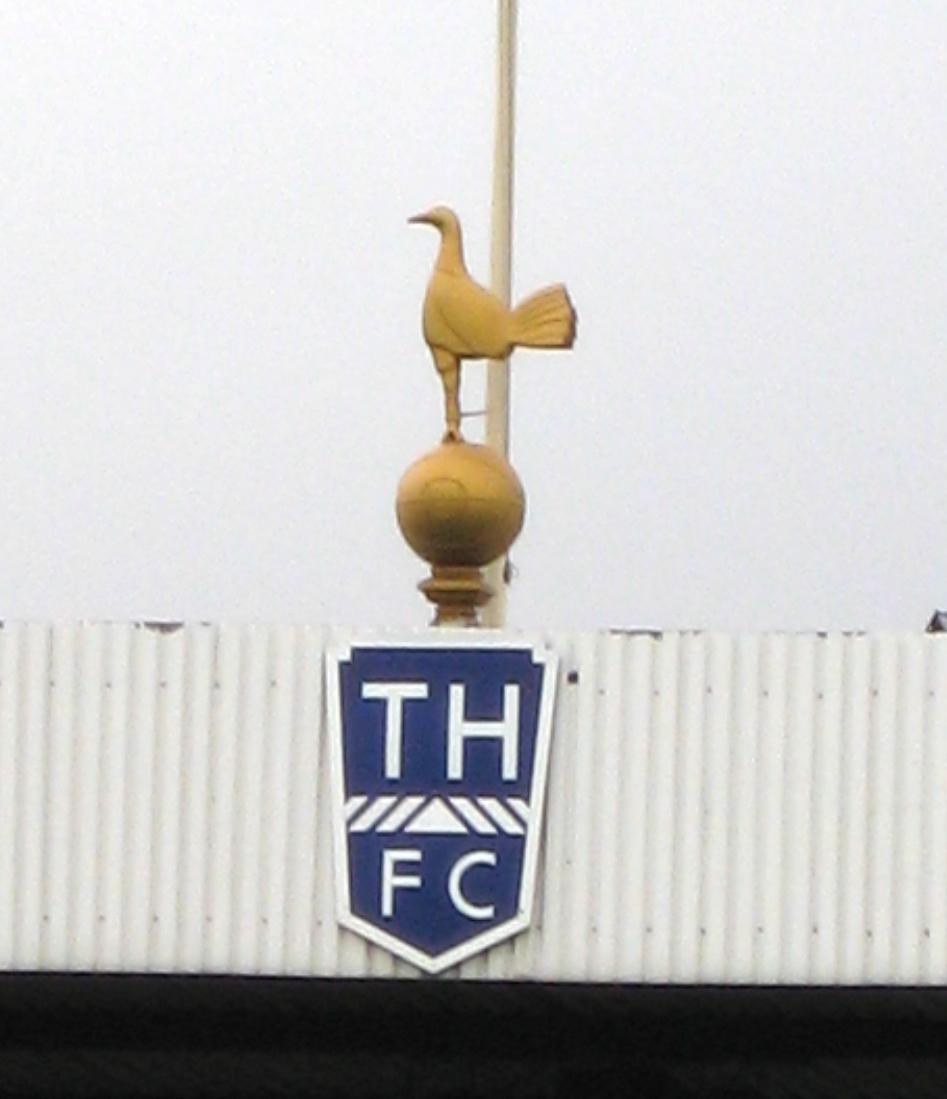
Since 1909, Tottenham have displayed the statue of a cockerel, first made in bronze by a former player

After Spurs were admitted to the Football League, the club started to build a new stadium, with stands designed by Archibald Leitch being constructed over the next two and a half decades. The West Stand was added in 1909, the East Stand was also covered this year and extended further two years later. The profits from the 1921 FA Cup win were used to build a covered terrace at the Paxton Road end and the Park Lane end was built at a cost of over £3,000 some two years later. This increased the stadium's capacity to around 58,000, with room for 40,000 under cover. The East Stand (Worcester Avenue) was finished in 1934 and this increased capacity to around 80,000 spectators and cost £60,000.

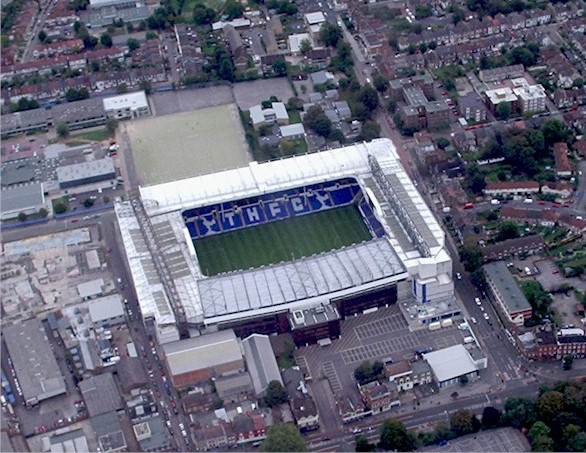
Aerial image of White Hart Lane. Redevelopment of this stadium began in early 1980s and completed in the late 1990s

Starting in the early 1980s, the stadium underwent another major phase of redevelopment. The West Stand was replaced by an expensive new structure in 1982, and the East Stand was renovated in 1988. In 1992, following the Taylor Report's recommendation that Premier League clubs eliminate standing areas, the lower terraces of the south and east stand were converted to seating, with the North Stand becoming all-seater the following season. The South Stand redevelopment was completed in March 1995 and included the first giant Sony Jumbotron TV screen for live game coverage and away match screenings. In the 1997–98 season the Paxton Road stand received a new upper tier and a second Jumbotron screen. Minor amendments to the seating configuration were made in 2006, bringing the capacity of the stadium to 36,310.

By the turn of the millennium, the capacity of White Hart Lane had become lower than other major Premier League clubs. Talks began over the future of the ground with a number of schemes considered, such as increasing the stadium capacity through redevelopment of the current site, or using the 2012 London Olympic Stadium in Stratford. Eventually the club settled on the Northumberland Development Project, whereby a new stadium would be built on a larger piece of land that incorporated the existing site. In 2016, the northeast corner of the stadium was removed to facilitate the construction of the new stadium. As this reduced the stadium capacity below that required for European games, Tottenham Hotspur played every European home game in 2016–17 at Wembley Stadium. Domestic fixtures of the 2016–17 season continued to be played at the Lane, but demolition of the rest of the stadium started the day after the last game of the season, and White Hart Lane was completely demolished by the end of July 2017.

=== Tottenham Hotspur Stadium ===
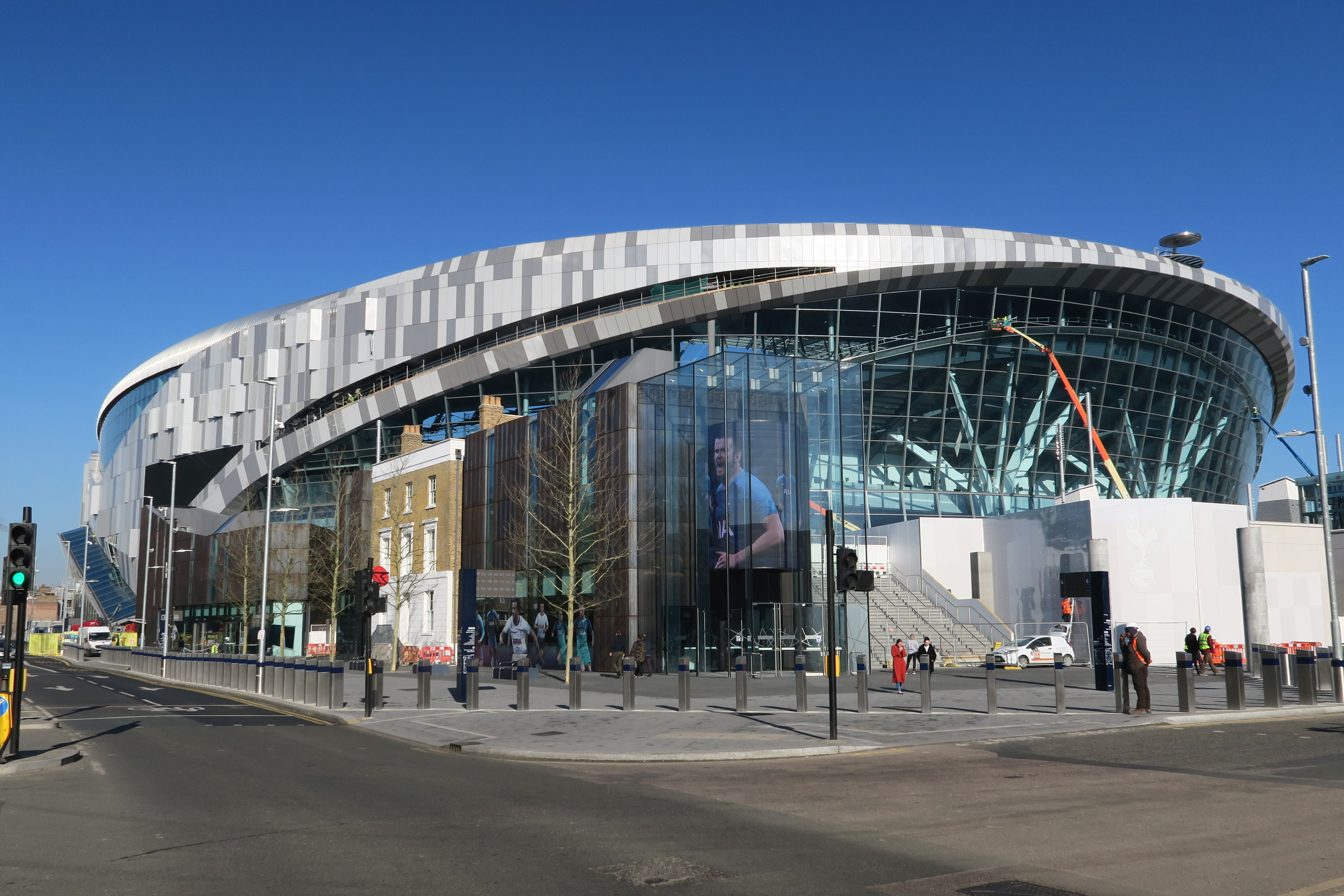
Tottenham Hotspur Stadium in February 2019

In October 2008, the club announced a plan to build a new stadium immediately to the north of the existing White Hart Lane stadium, with the southern half of the new stadium's pitch overlapping the northern part of the Lane. This proposal would become the Northumberland Development Project. The club submitted a planning application in October 2009 but, following critical reactions to the plan, it was withdrawn in favour of a substantially revised planning application for the stadium and other associated developments. The new plan was resubmitted and approved by Haringey Council in September 2010, and an agreement for the Northumberland Development Project was signed on 20 September 2011.

After a long delay over the compulsory purchase order of local businesses located on land to the north of the stadium and a legal challenge against the order, resolved in early 2015, planning application for another new design was approved by Haringey Council on 17 December 2015. Construction started in 2016, and the new stadium was scheduled to open during the 2018–19 season. While it was under construction, all Tottenham home games in the 2017–18 season as well as all but five in 2018–19 were played at Wembley Stadium. After two successful test events, Tottenham Hotspur officially moved into the new ground on 3 April 2019 with a Premier League match against Crystal Palace which Spurs won 2–0. The new stadium is called Tottenham Hotspur Stadium while a naming-rights agreement is reached.

== Training grounds ==
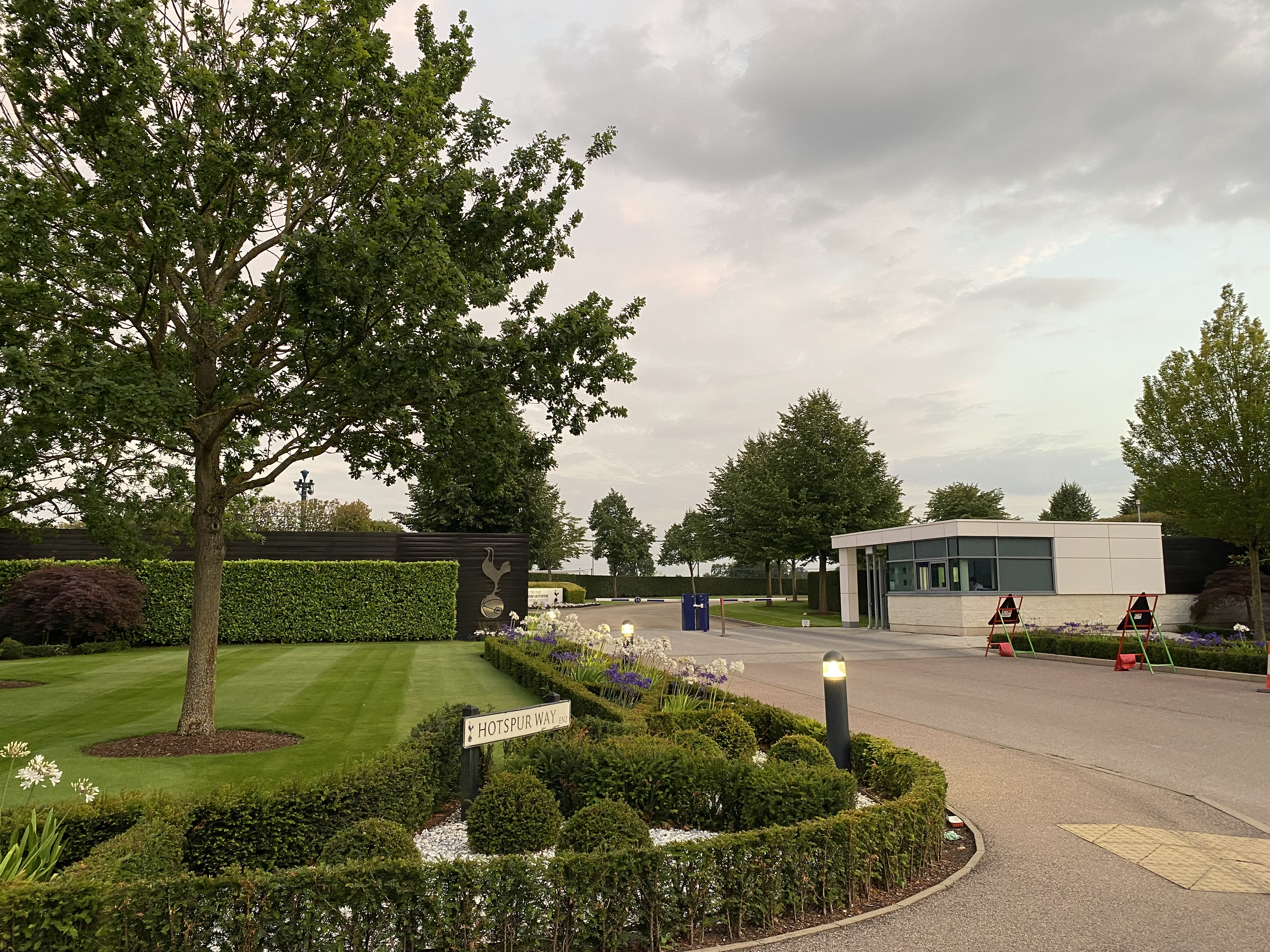
Entrance to Hotspur Way, Tottenham's training ground since 2012, pictured in July 2025

An early training ground used by Tottenham was located at Brookfield Lane in Cheshunt, Hertfordshire. The club bought the 11-acre ground used by Cheshunt F.C. in 1952 for £35,000. It had three pitches, including a small stadium with a small stand used for matches by the junior team. The ground was later sold for over £4 million, and the club moved the training ground to the Spurs Lodge on Luxborough Lane, Chigwell in Essex, opened in September 1996 by soon-to-be Prime Minister Tony Blair. The training ground and press centre in Chigwell were used until 2014.

In 2007, Tottenham bought a site at Bulls Cross in Enfield, a few miles south of their former ground in Cheshunt. A new training ground was constructed at the site for £45 million, which opened in 2012. The 77-acre site has 15 grass pitches and one-and-a-half artificial pitches, as well as a covered artificial pitch in the main building. The main building on Hotspur Way also has hydrotherapy and swimming pools, gyms, medical facilities, dining and rest areas for players as well as classrooms for academy and schoolboy players. A 45-bedroom players lodge with catering, treatment, rest and rehabilitation facilities was later added at Myddleton Farm next to the training site in 2018. The lodge is mainly used by Tottenham's first team and Academy players, but it has also been used by national football teams – the first visitors to use the facilities at the site were the Brazilian team in preparation for the 2018 FIFA World Cup.

== Crest ==
Between 1956 and 2006, the club crest featured a heraldic shield, displaying a number of local landmarks and associations.

This crest is from the 2017–18 season which is when the club reintroduced the shield. It was similar in design to the one introduced in the 1950s before the change to the 1956 shield.

Since the 1921 FA Cup Final, the Tottenham Hotspur crest has featured a cockerel. Harry Hotspur, after whom the club is named, was said to have been given the nickname Hotspur as he dug in his spurs to make his horse go faster as he charged in battles, and spurs are also associated with fighting cocks. The club used spurs as a symbol in 1900, which then evolved into a fighting cock. A former player named William James Scott made a bronze cast of a cockerel standing on a football at a cost of £35 (equivalent to £3,600 in 2025), and this 9-foot-6-inch (2.90 m) figure was then placed on top of the West Stand at the end of the 1909–10 season. Since then the cockerel and ball emblem has become a part of the club's identity. The club badge on the shirt used in 1921 featured a cockerel within a shield, but it was changed to a cockerel sitting on a ball in the late 1960s.

Between 1956 and 2006 Spurs used a faux heraldic shield featuring a number of local landmarks and associations. The castle is Bruce Castle, 400 yards from the ground and the trees are the Seven Sisters. The arms featured the Latin motto Audere Est Facere (to dare is to do).

In 1983, to overcome unauthorised "pirate" merchandising, the club's badge was altered by adding the two red heraldic lions to flank the shield (which came from the arms of the Northumberland family, of which Harry Hotspur was a member), as well as the motto scroll. This device appeared on Spurs' playing kits for three seasons 1996–99.

In 2006, in order to rebrand and modernise the club's image, the club badge and coat of arms were replaced by a professionally designed logo/emblem. This revamp displayed a sleeker and more elegant cockerel standing on an old-time football. The club claimed that they dropped their club name and would be using the rebranded logo only on playing kits. In November 2013, Tottenham forced non-league club Fleet Spurs to change their badge because its new design was "too similar" to the Tottenham crest.

In 2017, Spurs added a shield around the cockerel logo on the shirts similar to the 1950s badge, but with the cockerel of modern design. The shield was however removed the following season.

== Kit ==
The first Tottenham kit recorded in 1883 included a navy blue shirt with a letter H on a scarlet shield on the left breast, and white breeches. In 1884 or 1885, the club changed to a "quartered" kit similar to Blackburn Rovers after watching them win in the 1884 FA Cup Final. After they moved to Northumberland Park in 1888, they returned to the navy blue shirts for the 1889–90 season. Their kit changed again to red shirt and blue shorts in 1890, and for a time the team were known as 'the Tottenham Reds'. Five years later in 1895, the year they became a professional club, they switched to a chocolate and gold striped kit.

In the 1898–99 season, their final year at Northumberland Park, the club switched colours to white shirts and blue shorts, same colour choice as that for Preston North End. White and navy blue have remained as the club's basic colours ever since, with the white shirts giving the team the nickname "The Lilywhites". In 1921, the year they won the FA Cup, the cockerel badge was added to the shirt for the final. A club crest has featured on the shirt since, and Spurs became the first major club to have its club crest on the players shirt on every match apart from the war years. In 1939 numbers first appeared on shirt backs.

In the early days, the team played in kits sold by local outfitters. An early supplier of Spurs' jerseys recorded was a firm on Seven Sisters Road, HR Brookes. In the 1920s, Bukta produced the jerseys for the club. From the mid-1930s onwards, Umbro was the supplier for forty years. In 1959, the V-neck shirt replaced the collared shirts of the past, and then in 1963, the crew neck shirt appeared (the style has fluctuated since). In 1961, Bill Nicholson sent Spurs players out to play in white instead of navy shorts for their European campaign, starting a tradition which continues to this day in European competitions.

In 1977, a deal was signed with Admiral to supply the team their kits. Although Umbro kits in generic colours had been sold to football fans since 1959, it was with the Admiral deal that the market for replica shirts started to take off. Admiral changed the plain colours of earlier strips to shirts with more elaborate designs, which included manufacturer's logos, stripes down the arms and trims on the edges. Admiral was replaced by Le Coq Sportif in the summer of 1980. In 1985, Spurs entered into a business partnership with Hummel, who then supplied the strips. However, the attempt by Tottenham to expand the business side of the club failed, and in 1991, they returned to Umbro. In 1991, the club was the first to wear long-cut shorts, an innovation at a time when football kits all featured shorts cut well above the knee. Umbro was followed by Pony in 1995, Adidas in 1999, Kappa in 2002, and a five-year deal with Puma in 2006. In March 2011, Under Armour announced a five-year deal to supply Spurs with shirts and other apparel from the start of 2012–13, with the home, away and the third kits revealed in July and August 2012. The shirts incorporate technology that can monitor the players' heart rate and temperature and send the biometric data to the coaching staff. In June 2017, it was announced that Nike would be their new kits supplier, with the 2017–18 kit released on 30 June, featuring the Spurs' crest encased in a shield, paying homage to Spurs' 1960–61 season, where they became the first post-war-club to win both the Football League First Division and the FA Cup. In October 2018, Nike agreed a 15-year deal reportedly worth £30 million a year with the club to supply their kits until 2033.

Shirt sponsorship in English football was first adopted by the non-league club Kettering Town F.C. in 1976 despite it being banned by the FA. The ban was soon lifted and the practice spread to the major clubs when sponsored shirts were allowed on non-televised games in 1979, and then on televised games from 1983. In December 1983, after the club was floated on the London Stock Exchange, Holsten became the first commercial sponsor logo to appear on a Spurs shirt. When Thomson was chosen as kit sponsor in 2002 some Tottenham fans were unhappy as the shirt-front logo was red, the colour of their closest rivals, Arsenal. In 2006, Tottenham secured a £34 million sponsorship deal with internet casino group Mansion.com. In July 2010, Spurs announced a two-year shirt sponsorship contract with software infrastructure company Autonomy said to be worth £20 million. A month later they unveiled a £5 million deal with leading specialist bank and asset management firm Investec as shirt sponsor for the Champions League and domestic cup competitions for the next two years. Since 2014, AIA has been the main shirt sponsor, initially in a deal worth over £16 million annually. In 2019, this increased to a reported £40 to £45 million per year until 2027, later announced to transition to a training kit sponsor from 2027 to 2032. In 2023, Tottenham provisionally agreed a three-year shirt sponsorship deal with South Africa Tourism (SAT) starting in 2023/24 and ending in the 2026–27 season.

| 1883–84: First kit | 1884–86 | 1889–90 | 1890–96 | 1896–98 |

=== Kit suppliers and shirt sponsors ===
| Period | Kit manufacturer | Shirt sponsor (chest) | Shirt sponsor (sleeve) |
|---|---|---|---|
| 1907–1911 | HR Brookes | None | None |
| 1921–1930 | Bukta | None | None |
| 1935–1977 | Umbro | None | None |
| 1977–1980 | Admiral | None | None |
| 1980–1983 | Le Coq Sportif | None | None |
| 1983–1985 | Le Coq Sportif | Holsten | None |
| 1985–1991 | Hummel | Holsten | None |
| 1991–1995 | Umbro | Holsten | None |
| 1995–1999 | Pony | Hewlett-Packard | None |
| 1999–2002 | Adidas | Holsten | None |
| 2002–2006 | Kappa | Thomson Holidays | None |
| 2006–2010 | Puma | Mansion.com Casino & Poker | None |
| 2010–2011 | Puma | Autonomy Corporation (Note: Only appeared in the Premier League. Investec Bank appeared in the Champions League, FA Cup, League Cup and Europa League.) | None |
| 2011–2012 | Puma | Aurasma (Note: Aurasma is a subsidiary of the Autonomy Corporation.) | None |
| 2012–2013 | Under Armour | Aurasma | None |
| 2013–2014 | Under Armour | HP (Note: Hewlett-Packard is the parent company of the Autonomy Corporation and only appeared in the Premier League. AIA appeared in the FA Cup, League Cup and Europa League.) | None |
| 2014–2017 | Under Armour | AIA | None |
| 2017–2021 | Nike | AIA | None |
| 2021–2024 | Nike | AIA | Cinch |
| 2024–present | Nike | AIA | Kraken |

== Finances and ownership ==
Tottenham Hotspur F.C. became a limited company, the Tottenham Hotspur Football and Athletic Company Ltd, on 2 March 1898 so as to raise funds for the club and limit the personal liability of its members. 8,000 shares were issued at £1 each, although only 1,558 shares were taken up in the first year. 4,892 shares were sold in total by 1905. A few families held significant shares; they included the Wale family, who had association with the club since the 1930s, as well as the Richardson and the Bearman families. From 1943 to 1984, members of these families were chairmen of Tottenham Hotspur F.C. after Charles Robert who had been chairman since 1898 died.

In the early 1980s, cost overruns in the construction of a new West Stand together with the cost of rebuilding the team in previous years led to accumulating debts. In November 1982, a fan of the club Irving Scholar bought 25% of Tottenham for £600,000, and together with Paul Bobroff gained control of the club. In order to bring in funds, Scholar floated Tottenham Hotspur plc, which wholly owns the football club, on the London Stock Exchange in 1983, the first European sports club to be listed in a stock market, and became the first sports company to go public. Fans and institutions alike can now freely buy and trade shares in the company; a court ruling in 1935 involving the club (Berry and Stewart v Tottenham Hotspur FC Ltd) had previously established a precedent in company law that the directors of a company can refuse the transfer of shares from a shareholder to another person. The share issue was successful with 3.8 million shares quickly sold. However, ill-judged business decisions under Scholar led to financial difficulties, and in June 1991 Terry Venables teamed up with businessman Alan Sugar to buy the club, initially as equal partner with each investing £3.25 million. Sugar increased his stake to £8 million by December 1991 and became the dominant partner with effective control of the club. In May 1993, Venables was sacked from the board after a dispute. By 2000, Sugar began to consider selling the club, and in February 2001, he sold the major part of his shareholding to ENIC International Ltd.

The majority shareholder, ENIC International Ltd, is an investment company established by the British billionaire Joe Lewis. Daniel Levy, Lewis's partner at ENIC, was Executive Chairman of the club. They first acquired 29.9% share of the club in 1991, of which 27% was bought from Sugar for £22 million. Shareholding by ENIC increased over the decade through the purchase of the remaining 12% holding of Alan Sugar in 2007 for £25 million, and the 9.9% stake belonging to Stelios Haji-Ioannou through Hodram Inc. in 2009. On 21 August 2009 the club reported that they had issued a further 30 million shares to fund the initial development costs of the new stadium project, and that 27.8 million of these new shares had been purchased by ENIC. The Annual Report for 2010 indicated that ENIC had acquired 76% of all Ordinary Shares and also held 97% of all convertible redeemable preference shares, equivalent to a holding of 85% of share capital. The remaining shares are held by over 30,000 individuals. Between 2001 and 2011 shares in Tottenham Hotspur F.C. were listed on the Alternative Investment Market (AIM index). Following an announcement at the 2011 AGM, in January 2012 Tottenham Hotspur confirmed that the club had delisted its shares from the stock market, taking it into private ownership.

Lewis' shares are owned by the Lewis Family Trusts. In October 2022, Lewis ceased to be a person with significant control of the club, following a reorganisation of the Trusts. The club continues to be owned by ENIC, which is controlled by the Lewis trusts and Levy, and, in the summer of 2022, ENIC intended to inject up to £150 million into the club by the issuing of new shares. Only £100 million of shares were subscribed for and this took ENIC's shareholding up to 86.58%.

On 4 September 2025, the club announced Daniel Levy had stepped down as executive chairman and was succeeded by Peter Charrington, who holds the role in a non-executive capacity. Charrington reaffirmed the club's ownership status, stating that the club is not for sale. ENIC Sports & Developments Holdings Ltd, Tottenham's majority owner, "unequivocally rejected" two preliminary takeover approaches from PCP International Finance Limited (led by Amanda Staveley) and a consortium fronted by Roger Kennedy and Wing-Fai Ng via Firehawk Holdings. The offer period ends on 5 October 2025 under the UK's Takeover Code, allowing either bidder to submit a formal offer or withdraw. On 9 October 2025, ENIC injected a further £100 million into the club to provide additional resources and further strengthen the financial position. A source was reported as describing this as "initial additional funding" and said that "more money will be available".

In June 2026, it was reported that Levy had agreed to sell a 24.99% stake in ENIC to Eight Sports Capital, although no transaction had taken place by August. Later that month, the Lewis family trust was reported to have made a further £100 million injection, increasing the club's working capital.

== Support ==
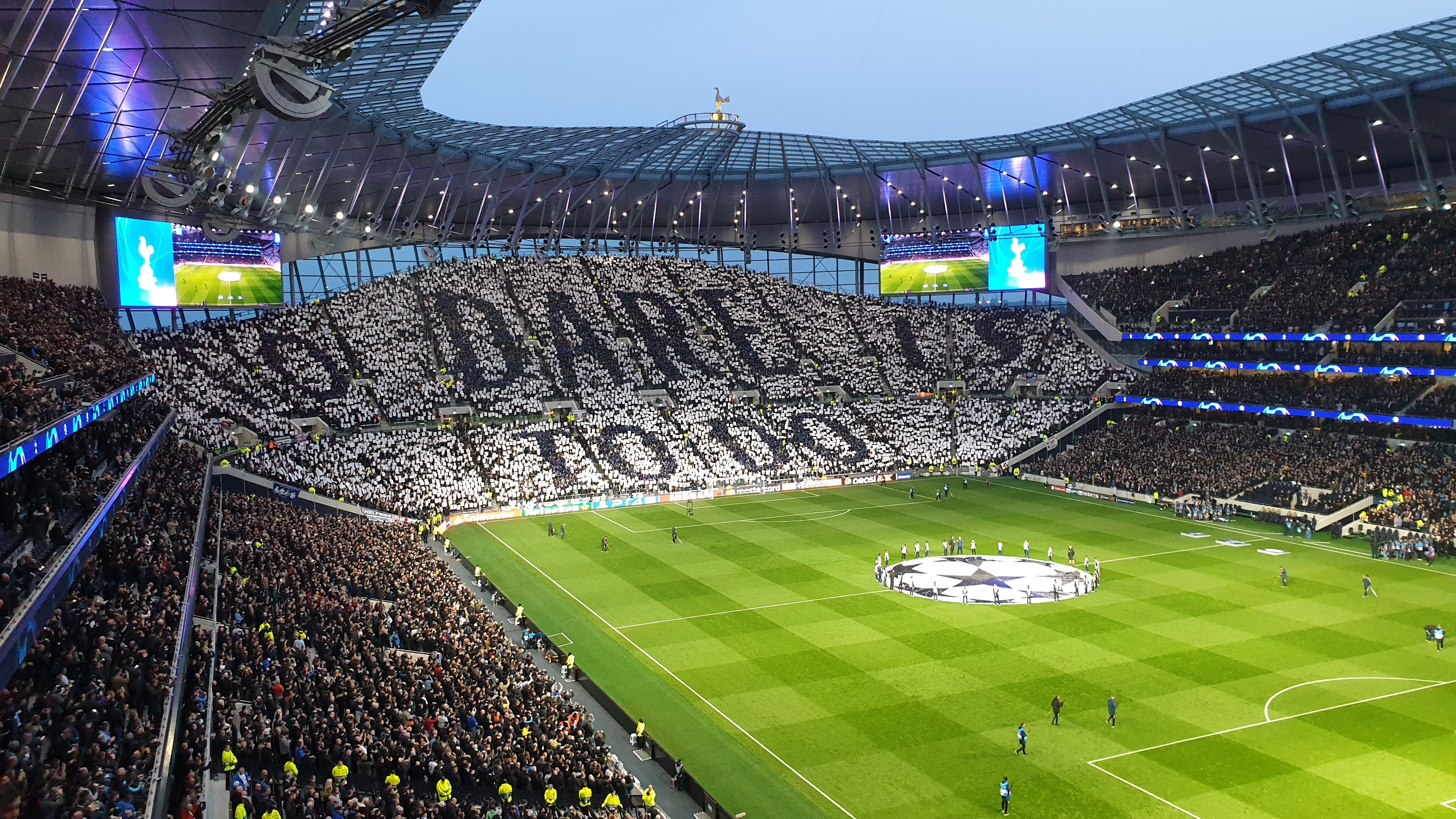
Fans displaying the club motto 'To Dare Is to Do' on the South Stand before the UEFA Champions League quarter-final with Manchester City on 9 April 2019

Tottenham has a large fan base in the United Kingdom, drawn largely from North London and the Home counties. The attendance figures for its home matches, however, have fluctuated over the years. Five times between 1950 and 1962, Tottenham had the highest average attendance in England. Tottenham was 9th in average attendances for the 2008–09 Premier League season, and 11th for all Premier League seasons between 1992–93 and 2010–11. In the 2017–18 season when Tottenham used Wembley as its home ground, it had the second-highest attendance in the Premier League. It also holds the record for attendance in the Premier League, with 83,222 attending the North London derby on 10 February 2018. Historical supporters of the club have included such figures as philosopher A. J. Ayer. There are many official supporters' clubs located around the world, while an independent supporters club, the Tottenham Hotspur Supporters' Trust, is recognised by the club as the representative body for Spurs supporters.

Historically, the club had a significant Jewish following from the Jewish communities in east and north London, with around a third of its supporters estimated to be Jewish in the 1930s. Due to this early support, all three chairmen of the club since 1984 have been Jewish businessmen with prior history of supporting the club. The club no longer has a greater Jewish contingent among its fans than other major London clubs (Jewish supporters are estimated to form at most 5% of its fanbase), though it is nevertheless still identified as a Jewish club by rival fans. Antisemitic chants directed at the club and its supporters by rival fans have been heard since the 1960s, with words such as "Yids" or "Yiddos" used against Tottenham supporters. In response to the abusive chants, Tottenham supporters, Jewish and non-Jewish alike, began to chant back the insults and adopt the "Yids" or "Yid Army" identity starting from around the late 1970s or early 1980s. Some fans view adopting "Yid" as a badge of pride, helping defuse its power as an insult. The use of "Yid" as a self-identification, however, has been controversial; some argued that the word is offensive and its use by Spurs fans "legitimis[es] references to Jews in football", and that such racist abuse should be stamped out in football. Both the World Jewish Congress and the Board of Deputies of British Jews have denounced the use of the word by fans. Others, such as former Prime Minister David Cameron, argued that its use by the Spurs fans is not motivated by hate as it is not used pejoratively, and therefore cannot be considered hate speech. Attempts to prosecute Tottenham fans who chanted the words have failed, as the Crown Prosecution Service considered that the words as used by Tottenham fans could not be judged legally "threatening, abusive or insulting".

=== Fan culture ===
There are a number of songs associated with the club and frequently sung by Spurs fans, such as "Glory Glory Tottenham Hotspur". The song originated in 1961 after Spurs completed the Double in 1960–61, and entered the European Cup for the first time. Their first opponents were Górnik Zabrze, the Polish champions, and after a hard-fought match Spurs suffered a 4–2 reverse. Tottenham's tough tackling prompted the Polish press to write that "they were no angels". These comments incensed a group of three fans and for the return match at White Hart Lane they dressed as angels wearing white sheets fashioned into togas, sandals, false beards and carrying placards bearing biblical-type slogans. The angels were allowed on the perimeter of the pitch and their fervour whipped up the home fans who responded with a rendition of "Glory Glory Hallelujah", which is still sung on terraces at White Hart Lane and other football grounds. The Lilywhites also responded to the atmosphere to win the tie 8–1. Then manager of Spurs, Bill Nicholson, wrote in his autobiography:

A new sound was heard in English football in the 1961–62 season. It was the hymn Glory, Glory Hallelujah being sung by 60,000 fans at White Hart Lane in our European Cup matches. I don't know how it started or who started it, but it took over the ground like a religious feeling.

— Bill Nicholson

There had been a number of incidents of hooliganism involving Spurs fans, particularly in the 1970s and 1980s. Significant events include the rioting by Spurs fans in Rotterdam at the 1974 UEFA Cup final against Feyenoord, and again during the 1983–84 UEFA Cup matches against Feyenoord in Rotterdam and Anderlecht in Brussels. Although fan violence has since abated, the occasional incidence of hooliganism continues to be reported.

=== Rivalries ===
Tottenham playing against rivals Arsenal in the North London derby, in April 2010. Tottenham fans are singing to Sol Campbell after he left Spurs and joined Arsenal in 2001

Tottenham supporters have rivalries with several clubs, mainly within the London area. The fiercest of these is with north London rivals Arsenal. The rivalry began in 1913 when Arsenal moved from the Manor Ground, Plumstead to Arsenal Stadium, Highbury, and this rivalry intensified in 1919 when Arsenal were unexpectedly promoted to the First Division, taking a place that Tottenham believed should have been theirs.

Tottenham also share rivalries with fellow London clubs Chelsea and West Ham United. The rivalry with Chelsea is secondary in importance to the North London derby and began when Spurs beat Chelsea in the 1967 FA Cup final, the first ever all-London final. West Ham fans view Tottenham as a bitter rival, although the animosity is not reciprocated to the same extent by Tottenham fans.

== Social responsibility ==
The club through its Community Programme has, since 2006, been working with Haringey Council and the Metropolitan Housing Trust and the local community on developing sports facilities and social programmes which have also been financially supported by Barclays Spaces for Sport and the Football Foundation. The Tottenham Hotspur Foundation received high-level political support from the prime minister when it was launched at 10 Downing Street in February 2007.

In the financial year 2006–07, Tottenham topped a league of Premier League charitable donations when viewed both in overall terms and as a percentage of turnover by giving £4,545,889, including a one-off contribution of £4.5 million over four years, to set up the Tottenham Hotspur Foundation. The foundation has, in conjunction with its partners, run business creation "bootcamps" and provided funding to young entrepreneurs to help with the launch of their start-ups. Tottenham became the global charity partner for SOS Children's Villages UK in 2007.

More controversially, in the stadium redevelopment in the Northumberland Development Project in an area which has suffered high levels of deprivation, a requirement of 50% affordable housing was waived and a payment of £16 million for community infrastructure was reduced to £500,000. The club argued that the project, when completed, would support 3,500 jobs and inject an estimated £293 million into the local economy annually, and that it would serve as the catalyst for a wider 20-year regeneration programme for the Tottenham area. In other developments in Tottenham, the club has built 256 affordable homes and a 400-pupil primary school.

On 17 August 2026, the club announced the change of operating name from Tottenham Hotspur Foundation to Spurs in the Community to better reflect its identity and purpose. Tottenham Hotspur Foundation remains the registered charity name.

=== London Academy of Excellence ===
As part of the development of Tottenham Hotspur Stadium, the club built an elite educational facility to sit alongside its club offices. The London Academy of Excellence Tottenham (LAET) is a state-funded Sixth Form, sponsored by the Club and Highgate School – the principle academic sponsors who deliver expert teaching. LAET was named the Sunday Times Sixth Form College of the Year, 2020 by Parent Power, The Sunday Times School Guide. In 2022, LAET achieved an "Outstanding" Ofsted rating across all areas.

=== Environmental sustainability ===
Spurs are one of the high-profile participants in the 10:10 project, which they joined in 2009. In a year, the carbon emissions were reduced by 14%, an estimated 400 tonnes of carbon. The club further said it is dedicated to minimising the environmental impact of its activities across all operations, setting targets to reduce its carbon emissions by 50% by 2030 and become net-zero by 2040.

In September 2021, the club partnered with Sky Sports to host the world's first net-zero carbon top-level football game. The initiative won in the Sustainability category at the 2022 Football Business Awards. In 2023, the club was ranked No. 1 in the Premier League's Sustainability Rankings for the fourth year in a row.

== Honours ==
Sources: Tottenham Hotspur – History

=== Domestic ===
==== Leagues ====
- First Division (Tier 1)
  - Winners (2): 1950–51, 1960–61
- Second Division (Tier 2)
  - Winners (2): 1919–20, 1949–50

==== Cups ====
- FA Cup
  - Winners (8): 1900–01, 1920–21, 1960–61, 1961–62, 1966–67, 1980–81, 1981–82, 1990–91
- League Cup
  - Winners (4): 1970–71, 1972–73, 1998–99, 2007–08
- FA Charity Shield / FA Community Shield
  - Winners (7): 1921, 1951, 1961, 1962, 1967*, 1981*, 1991* (* shared)

=== European ===
- UEFA Cup / UEFA Europa League
  - Winners (3): 1971–72, 1983–84, 2024–25
- European Cup Winners' Cup
  - Winners (1): 1962–63
- Anglo-Italian League Cup
  - Winners (1): 1971

== Statistics and records ==
Chart of Tottenham's performance since joining the Football League in 1908

Steve Perryman holds the appearance record for Spurs, having played 854 games for the club between 1969 and 1986, of which 655 were league matches. Harry Kane holds the club goal scoring record with 280 goals scored.

Tottenham's record league win is 9–0 against Bristol Rovers in the Second Division on 22 October 1977. The club's record cup victory came on 3 February 1960 with a 13–2 win over Crewe Alexandra in the FA Cup. Spurs' biggest top-flight victory came against Wigan Athletic on 22 November 2009, when they won 9–1 with Jermain Defoe scoring five goals. The club's record defeat is an 8–0 loss to 1. FC Köln in the Intertoto Cup on 22 July 1995.

The record home attendance at White Hart Lane is 75,038 for a cup tie on 5 March 1938 against Sunderland. The highest attendance at the Tottenham Hotspur Stadium is 62,027 for a Premier League match against Arsenal on 12 May 2022. The highest recorded home attendances were at their temporary home, Wembley Stadium, due to its higher capacity – 85,512 spectators were present on 2 November 2016 for the 2016–17 UEFA Champions League game against Bayer Leverkusen, while 83,222 attended the North London derby against Arsenal on 10 February 2018, the highest attendance recorded for any Premier League game.

== Players ==
=== Current squad ===
As of 1 September 2026

Note: Flags indicate national team as defined under FIFA eligibility rules; some limited exceptions apply. Players may hold more than one non-FIFA nationality.

| No. | Pos. | Nation | Player |
|---|---|---|---|
| 3 | DF | SCO | Andy Robertson |
| 4 | DF | ENG | Tosin Adarabioyo |
| 5 | DF | ARG | Marcos Senesi |
| 6 | DF | NED | Jan Paul van Hecke |
| 7 | MF | NED | Xavi Simons |
| 8 | MF | ENG | Conor Gallagher |
| 9 | FW | BRA | Richarlison |
| 10 | MF | ENG | James Maddison (4th captain) |
| 11 | FW | FRA | Mathys Tel |
| 13 | DF | ITA | Destiny Udogie |
| 14 | MF | ENG | Archie Gray (5th captain) |
| 15 | MF | SWE | Lucas Bergvall |
| 16 | MF | ITA | Sandro Tonali |
| 17 | FW | BRA | Sávio |
| 18 | MF | POR | Mateus Fernandes |

| No. | Pos. | Nation | Player |
|---|---|---|---|
| 19 | FW | ENG | Dominic Solanke |
| 20 | FW | GHA | Mohammed Kudus |
| 21 | FW | SWE | Dejan Kulusevski |
| 22 | FW | EGY | Omar Marmoush (on loan from Manchester City) |
| 23 | DF | ESP | Pedro Porro (vice-captain) |
| 27 | FW | UKR | Mykhailo Mudryk (on loan from Chelsea) |
| 28 | FW | FRA | Wilson Odobert |
| 30 | MF | URU | Rodrigo Bentancur |
| 31 | GK | CZE | Antonín Kinský |
| 33 | DF | WAL | Ben Davies (3rd captain) |
| 37 | DF | NED | Micky van de Ven (captain) |
| 39 | GK | SVK | Martin Dúbravka |
| 40 | GK | ENG | Brandon Austin |
| 68 | MF | ENG | Luca Williams-Barnett |

Out on loan

Note: Flags indicate national team as defined under FIFA eligibility rules; some limited exceptions apply. Players may hold more than one non-FIFA nationality.

| No. | Pos. | Nation | Player |
|---|---|---|---|
| 1 | GK | ITA | Guglielmo Vicario (at Juventus until 30 June 2027) |
| 25 | DF | JPN | Kōta Takai (at Sint-Truidense until 30 June 2027) |
| 29 | MF | SEN | Pape Matar Sarr (at Juventus until 30 June 2027) |
| 38 | DF | BRA | Souza (at Porto until 30 June 2027) |

| No. | Pos. | Nation | Player |
|---|---|---|---|
| 47 | MF | ENG | Mikey Moore (at 1. FC Köln until 30 June 2027) |
| — | DF | AUT | Kevin Danso (at Sunderland until 30 June 2027) |
| — | DF | ROU | Radu Drăgușin (at Fiorentina until 30 June 2027) |
| — | FW | KOR | Yang Min-hyeok (at KVC Westerlo until 30 June 2027) |

=== Academy ===
Following the implementation of the Premier League Elite Player Performance Plan, Tottenham Hotspur runs a Category One Academy, designed to develop players from the age of eight to 21 years. It has more than 200 players. The Under–21s are the Development Squad and the Under–18s are the youth teams of Tottenham Hotspur. The Under–21 players play in Premier League 2 and compete in the EFL Trophy. The Academy's Under–18s take part in the U18 Premier League (South). The following current Under–21 or Under–18 players have played in a competitive first-team match for Tottenham Hotspur.

Note: Flags indicate national team as defined under FIFA eligibility rules; some limited exceptions apply. Players may hold more than one non-FIFA nationality.

| No. | Pos. | Nation | Player |
|---|---|---|---|
| 48 | DF | ENG | Alfie Dorrington |
| 64 | MF | ENG | Callum Olusesi |
| 65 | DF | ENG | James Rowswell |
| 67 | DF | ENG | Jun'ai Byfield |

Out on loan

Note: Flags indicate national team as defined under FIFA eligibility rules; some limited exceptions apply. Players may hold more than one non-FIFA nationality.

| No. | Pos. | Nation | Player |
|---|---|---|---|
| 43 | FW | NIR | Jamie Donley (at Luton Town until 30 June 2027) |
| 50 | MF | ENG | George Abbott (at Mansfield Town until 30 June 2027) |
| 63 | FW | ENG | Damola Ajayi (at Barnet until 30 June 2027) |

== Management and support staff ==
Management and support staff as of July 2026
| Role | Name |
|---|---|
| Head coach | Roberto De Zerbi |
| Assistant coaches | Bruno Saltor |
| Assistant coaches | Andrew Crofts |
| Assistant coaches | Andreas Georgson |
| Individual development coach | Cameron Campbell |
| Technical development coordinator | Francesco Calone |
| Goalkeeping coaches | Fabian Otte |
| Goalkeeping coaches | Dean Brill |
| Senior professional development phase coach | Marcello Quinto |
| Senior professional development phase coach | Enrico Venturelli |
| First team fitness coach | Marcattilio Marcattilii |
| First team fitness coach | Agostino Tibaudi |
| Club ambassadors | Michael Dawson |
| Club ambassadors | Ledley King |
| Club ambassadors | Gary Mabbutt |
| Director of football operations | Rafi Moersen |
| Football Secretary | Jennifer Urquhart |
| Technical Director | Johan Lange |
| Performance director | Dan Lewindon |
| Head of football insights and strategy | Frederik Leth |
| Head of methodology | Zaheer Shah |
| Head performance analyst | Ross Johnston |
| Lead scouting insights analyst | Joe Bucknall |
| Lead recruitment analyst | Nick Benett |
| Recruitment analysts | Simon Cozens |
| Recruitment analysts | Alex Troughton |
| Lead player development and methodology analyst | Alex Vinall |
| Head of training centre operations | Paul May |
| Academy director | Simon Davies |
| Head of loans and pathways | Andy Scoulding |
| Head of academy football development | Gary Broadhurst |
| Head of recruitment | Rob Mackenzie |
| Chief scout | Alex Fraser |
| Scouts | Giuseppe Di Credico |
| Scouts | João Ferreira |
| Scouts | Max Legath |
| Scouts | Sebastian Taghizadeh |
| Head of medical | Nick Stubbings |
| Head of medical services | Ali James |
| Head of athletic development | Tom Tombleson |
| Head of strength and conditioning | Tom Perryman |
| Strength and conditioning coach | Matt Bickley |
| Strength and conditioning coach | Peter Habershon |
| Head of sports science | Michael Cooper |
| Head of nutrition | Ted Munson |
| Lead performance physio | Matthew Davies |
| Lead rehab physio | Richard Clark |
| Rehab physio | Liam Horgan |
| Head of therapy services | Stuart Campbell |
| Head of kit and equipment | Steve Dukes |

== Directors ==
| Role | Name |
|---|---|
| Non-executive chairman | Peter Charrington |
| Chief executive officer | Vinai Venkatesham |
| Operations and finance director | Matthew Collecott |
| Non-executive director | Jonathan Turner |
| Non-executive director | Eric Hinson |

These are the directors of Tottenham Hotspur Limited, the holding company of the club.

== Administration and senior management ==
| Role | Name |
|---|---|
| Chief technology officer | Rob Pickering |
| Chief revenue officer | Ryan Norys |
| Commercial director | Alex Scotcher |
| Chief marketing officer | Adam Gardiner |
| Chief communications officer | Kate Miller |
| Director of legal | Katie Reed |
| Chief people officer | Angela Cardani-Liggett |
| Stadium Director | Jon Babbs |
| Head of Ticketing and Membership | Ian Murphy |
| Head of Football Communications | Anthony Marshall |

== Managers and players ==
=== Managers and head coaches in club's history ===
- Listed according to when they became managers for Tottenham Hotspur:

- (A) – Acting
- (C) – Caretaker
- (I) – Interim
- (FTC) – First team coach

- 1898 (England) Frank Brettell
- 1899 (Scotland) John Cameron
- 1907 (England) Fred Kirkham
- 1912 (Scotland) Peter McWilliam
- 1927 (England) Billy Minter
- 1930 (England) Percy Smith
- 1935 (England) Wally Hardinge (C)
- 1935 (England) Jack Tresadern
- 1938 (Scotland) Peter McWilliam
- 1942 (England) Arthur Turner
- 1946 (England) Joe Hulme
- 1949 (England) Arthur Rowe
- 1955 (England) Jimmy Anderson
- 1958 (England) Bill Nicholson
- 1974 (Northern Ireland) Terry Neill
- 1976 (England) Keith Burkinshaw
- 1984 (England) Peter Shreeves
- 1986 (England) David Pleat
- 1987 (England) Trevor Hartley (C)
- 1987 (England) Doug Livermore (C)
- 1987 (England) Terry Venables
- 1991 (England) Peter Shreeves
- 1992 (England) Doug Livermore
  - (England) Ray Clemence (FTC)
- 1993 (Argentina) Osvaldo Ardiles
- 1994 (England) Steve Perryman (C)
- 1994 (England) Gerry Francis
- 1997 (Republic of Ireland) Chris Hughton (C)
- 1997 (Switzerland) Christian Gross
- 1998 (England) David Pleat (C)
- 1998 (Scotland) George Graham
- 2001 (England) David Pleat (C)
- 2001 (England) Glenn Hoddle
- 2003 (England) David Pleat (C)
- 2004 (France) Jacques Santini
- 2004 (Netherlands) Martin Jol
- 2007 (England) Clive Allen (C)
- 2007 (Spain) Juande Ramos
- 2008 (England) Harry Redknapp
- 2012 (Portugal) André Villas-Boas
- 2013 (England) Tim Sherwood
- 2014 (Argentina) Mauricio Pochettino
- 2019 (Portugal) José Mourinho
- 2021 (England) Ryan Mason (I)
- 2021 (Portugal) Nuno Espírito Santo
- 2021 (Italy) Antonio Conte
- 2023 (Italy) Cristian Stellini (A)
- 2023 (England) Ryan Mason (A)
- 2023 (Australia) Ange Postecoglou
- 2025 (Denmark) Thomas Frank
- 2026 (Croatia) Igor Tudor
- 2026 (Italy) Roberto De Zerbi

=== Club Hall of Fame ===
The following players are noted as "greats" for their contributions to the club, or have been inducted into the club's Hall of Fame. On 4 September 2026, the club announced it had re-launched the Hall of Fame in conjunction with the Fan Advisory Board after a hiatus since 2017, and there would be a new Hall of Fame wall installation near the players' tunnel.

==== Men's team players ====
- (Argentina) Osvaldo Ardiles
- (Argentina) Ricardo Villa
- (England) Clive Allen
- (England) Les Allen
- (England) Paul Allen
- (England) Darren Anderton
- (England) Peter Baker
- (England) Phil Beal
- (England) Bobby Buckle
- (England) Keith Burkinshaw
- (England) Martin Chivers
- (England) Tommy Clay
- (England) Ray Clemence
- (England) Ralph Coates
- (England) Garth Crooks
- (England) Jimmy Dimmock
- (England) Ted Ditchburn
- (England) Terry Dyson
- (England) Paul Gascoigne
- (England) Jimmy Greaves
- (England) Arthur Grimsdell
- (England) Willie Hall
- (England) Ron Henry
- (England) Glenn Hoddle
- (England) Jack Jull
- (England) Ledley King
- (England) Cyril Knowles
- (England) Gary Lineker
- (England) Gary Mabbutt
- (England) Paul Miller
- (England) Billy Minter
- (England) Tom Morris
- (England) Alan Mullery
- (England) Bill Nicholson
- (England) Maurice Norman
- (England) Steve Perryman
- (England) Martin Peters
- (England) John Pratt
- (England) Graham Roberts
- (England) Teddy Sheringham
- (England) Bobby Smith
- (England) Chris Waddle
- (England) Fanny Walden
- (England) Vivian Woodward
- (France) David Ginola
- (Germany) Steffen Freund
- (Germany) Jürgen Klinsmann
- (Republic of Ireland) Chris Hughton
- (Northern Ireland) Danny Blanchflower
- (Northern Ireland) Pat Jennings
- (Scotland) Steve Archibald
- (Scotland) Bill Brown
- (Scotland) John Cameron
- (Scotland) Alan Gilzean
- (Scotland) Dave Mackay
- (Scotland) John White
- (Wales) Ronnie Burgess
- (Wales) Mike England
- (Wales) Cliff Jones
- (Wales) Terry Medwin
- (Wales) Taffy O'Callaghan

== Player of the Year ==
As voted by members and season ticket holders (calendar year until 2005–06 season)

=== Men's team players ===
- 1987 (England) Gary Mabbutt
- 1988 (England) Chris Waddle
- 1989 (Norway) Erik Thorstvedt
- 1990 (England) Paul Gascoigne
- 1991 (England) Paul Allen
- 1992 (England) Gary Lineker
- 1993 (England) Darren Anderton
- 1994 (Germany) Jürgen Klinsmann
- 1995 (England) Teddy Sheringham
- 1996 (England) Sol Campbell
- 1997 (England) Sol Campbell
- 1998 (France) David Ginola
- 1999 (Republic of Ireland) Stephen Carr
- 2000 (Republic of Ireland) Stephen Carr
- 2001 (Scotland) Neil Sullivan
- 2002 (Wales) Simon Davies
- 2003 (Republic of Ireland) Robbie Keane
- 2004 (England) Jermain Defoe
- 2005–06 (Republic of Ireland) Robbie Keane
- 2006–07 (Bulgaria) Dimitar Berbatov
- 2007–08 (Republic of Ireland) Robbie Keane
- 2008–09 (England) Aaron Lennon
- 2009–10 (England) Michael Dawson
- 2010–11 (Croatia) Luka Modrić
- 2011–12 (England) Scott Parker
- 2012–13 (Wales) Gareth Bale
- 2013–14 (Denmark) Christian Eriksen
- 2014–15 (England) Harry Kane
- 2015–16 (Belgium) Toby Alderweireld
- 2016–17 (Denmark) Christian Eriksen
- 2017–18 (Belgium) Jan Vertonghen
- 2018–19 (South Korea) Son Heung-min
- 2019–20 (South Korea) Son Heung-min
- 2020–21 (England) Harry Kane
- 2021–22 (South Korea) Son Heung-min
- 2022–23 (England) Harry Kane
- 2023–24 (Netherlands) Micky van de Ven
- 2024–25 (Sweden) Lucas Bergvall
- 2025–26 (England) Archie Gray

== Tottenham Hotspur Women ==
Tottenham's women's team was founded in 1985 as Broxbourne Ladies. They started using the Tottenham Hotspur name for the 1991–92 season and played in the London and South East Women's Regional Football League (then fourth tier of the game). They won promotion after topping the league in 2007–08. In the 2016–17 season they won the FA Women's Premier League Southern Division and a subsequent playoff, gaining promotion to the FA Women's Super League 2.

On 1 May 2019, Tottenham Hotspur Ladies won promotion to the FA Women's Super League with a 1–1 draw at Aston Villa, which confirmed they would finish second in the Championship. Tottenham Hotspur Ladies changed their name to Tottenham Hotspur Women in the 2019–20 season.

Tottenham Hotspur Women announced the signing of Cho So-hyun on 29 January 2021. With her Korean men's counterpart Son Heung-min already at the club it gave Spurs the rare distinction of having both the men's and women's Korean National Team captains at one club.

== Formula racing ==
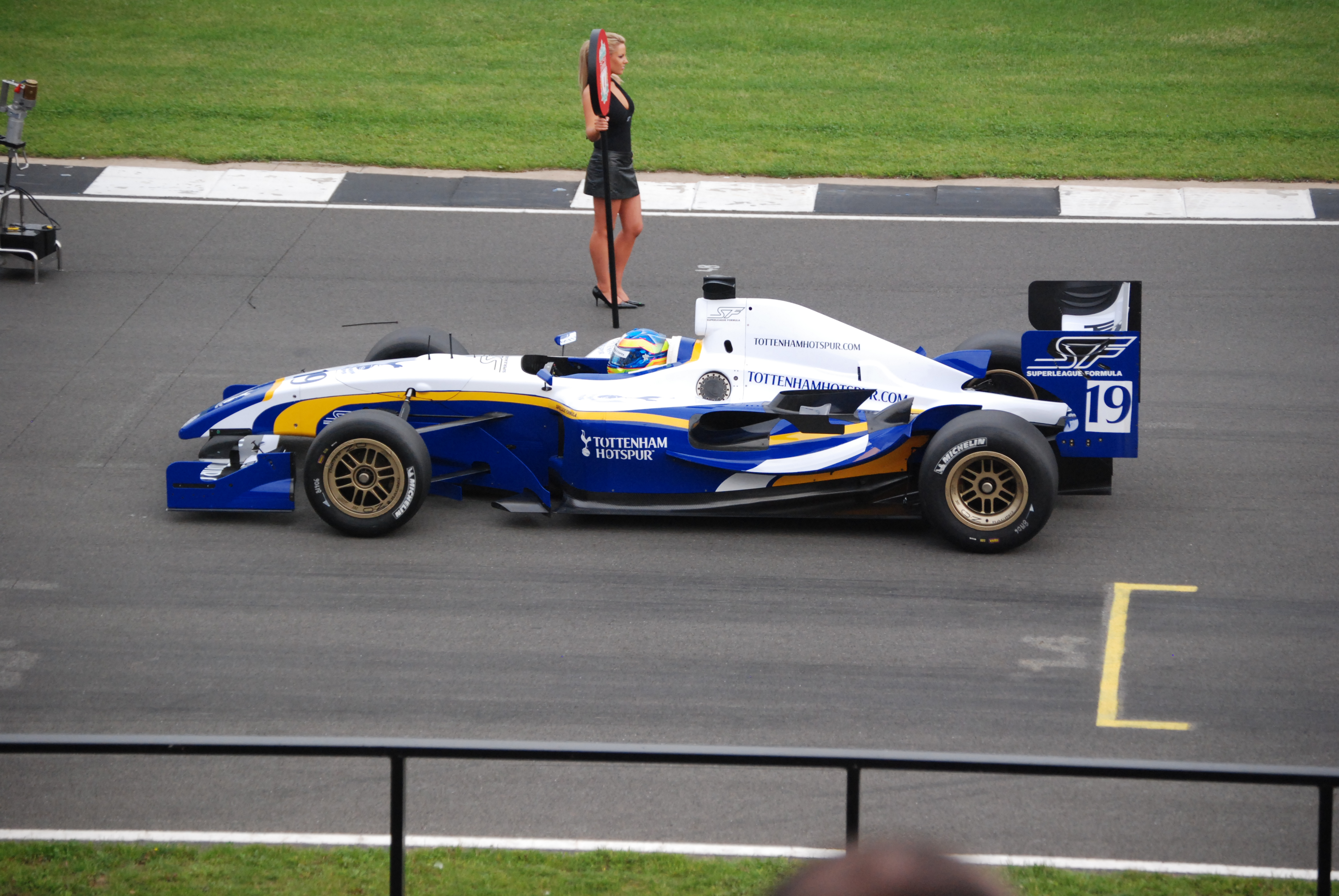
Duncan Tappy on the grid during the 2008 Donington weekend

Tottenham Hotspur competed in Superleague Formula for three seasons from 2008 to 2010. Duncan Tappy was the main driver in the first season racing 10 times with three podium finishes. In 2010 Tottenham won the trophy with driver Craig Dolby.

Through its partnership with F1, the club has also introduced kart racing. The attraction, named F1 Drive, is located underneath the south stands. Three track layouts are available, suiting everyone from beginners to elite karters.

== Affiliated clubs ==
Tottenham Hotspur have previously been affiliated with international clubs including Internacional, the San Jose Earthquakes, South China AA, and Kickstart FC.
