= 1920–21 FA Cup =

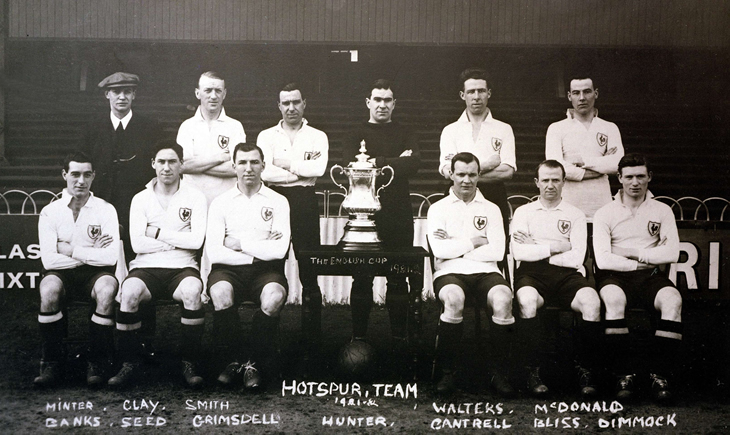
- The Tottenham team following their second FA Cup championship

Tournament details
- Country: England; Wales

Final positions
- Champions: Tottenham Hotspur (2nd title)
- Runners-up: Wolverhampton Wanderers

The 1920–21 FA Cup was the 46th season of the world's oldest association football competition, the Football Association Challenge Cup (more usually known as the FA Cup). Tottenham Hotspur won the competition, defeating Wolverhampton Wanderers 1–0 in the final at Stamford Bridge, London.

Matches were scheduled to be played at the stadium of the team named first on the date specified for each round, which was always a Saturday. If scores were level after 90 minutes had been played, a replay would take place at the stadium of the second-named team later the same week. If the replayed match was drawn further replays would be held at neutral venues until a winner was determined. If scores were level after 90 minutes had been played in a replay, a 30-minute period of extra time would be played.

== Calendar ==
The format of the FA Cup for the season had two preliminary rounds, six qualifying rounds, four proper rounds, and the semi-finals and final.

Round	Date
Extra preliminary round	Saturday 11 September 1920
Preliminary round	Saturday 25 September 1920
First round qualifying	Saturday 9 October 1920
Second round qualifying	Saturday 24 October 1920
Third round qualifying	Saturday 6 November 1920
Fourth Round qualifying	Saturday 20 November 1920
Fifth round qualifying	Saturday 4 December 1920
Sixth round qualifying	Saturday 18 December 1920
First round proper	Saturday 8 January 1921
Second round proper	Saturday 29 January 1921
Third round proper	Saturday 19 February 1921
Fourth round proper	Saturday 5 March 1921
Semi-finals	Saturday 19 March 1921
Final	Saturday 23 April 1921

== Qualifying rounds ==
This season saw the introduction of the Football League Third Division, composed almost entirely of clubs from the previous season's Southern League First Division. The Southern League champions Cardiff City were voted into the Second Division, but Grimsby Town, who had lost their League status at the same election, were later added to the new competition with the Football League agreeing to recognise their position as relegated. These arrangements meant that 14 Football League clubs would be required to enter the FA Cup in the qualifying rounds.

The seven League clubs winning through to the main draw from the sixth qualifying round were Clapton Orient from the Second Division and Bristol Rovers, Swansea Town, Southend United, Northampton Town, Luton Town and Grimsby Town from the Third Division. Five non-league clubs also progressed, these being Bath City, Rochdale, Eccles United, Darlington and Lincoln City. Bath City and Eccles United were making their initial appearances in the first round proper, while the other three non-league sides joined the new Third Division North at the start of the following season.

This season's extra preliminary round contained 136 teams but none were able to emulate the heroics of Thornycrofts (Woolston) and Hednesford Town from the previous tournament. The best performed team from the extra preliminary stage this time was Worksop Town, who progressed to the sixth qualifying round before losing to Bristol Rovers.

For all qualifying round results, see 1920–21 FA Cup qualifying rounds.

== First round proper ==
52 of the 66 clubs from the First, Second and Third divisions joined the 12 clubs who came through the qualifying rounds. Of the 14 League teams not receiving a bye to the first round proper, Second Division side Leeds United was entered in the extra preliminary round, as that club's admission to the Second Division had been by election, rather than through promotion. However, after easy victories against local amateur outfits in their first two matches, the club had to forfeit their first qualifying round tie against Harrogate as it clashed with a League fixture against The Wednesday at Hillsborough. Three sides from the Third Division (Merthyr Town, Newport County and Gillingham) were entered in the fourth qualifying round, while four from the Second Division and six from the Third Division were entered in the sixth qualifying round. These were:

Second Division

- Clapton Orient
- Port Vale
- Rotherham County
- Coventry City

Third Division

- Swansea Town
- Luton Town
- Bristol Rovers
- Grimsby Town
- Southend United
- Northampton Town

Of those sides not proceeding to the first round proper, Port Vale lost to Clapton Orient, Coventry City lost to Rochdale and Rotherham County lost to Luton Town.

32 matches were scheduled to be played on Saturday, 8 January 1921. Six matches were drawn and went to replays in the following midweek fixture, of which one went to another replay.

Tie no	Home team	Score	Away team	Date
1	Darlington	2–2	Blackpool	8 January 1921
Replay	Blackpool	2–1	Darlington	12 January 1921
2	Liverpool	1–1	Manchester United	8 January 1921
Replay	Manchester United	1–2	Liverpool	12 January 1921
3	Preston North End	2–0	Bolton Wanderers	8 January 1921
4	South Shields	3–0	Portsmouth	8 January 1921
5	Watford	3–0	Exeter City	8 January 1921
6	Reading	0–0	Chelsea	8 January 1921
Replay	Chelsea	2–2	Reading	12 January 1921
Replay	Chelsea	3–1	Reading	17 January 1921
7	Leicester City	3–7	Burnley	8 January 1921
8	Notts County	3–0	West Bromwich Albion	8 January 1921
9	Blackburn Rovers	1–1	Fulham	8 January 1921
Replay	Fulham	1–0	Blackburn Rovers	12 January 1921
10	Aston Villa	2–0	Bristol City	8 January 1921
11	The Wednesday	1–0	West Ham United	8 January 1921
12	Grimsby Town	1–0	Norwich City	8 January 1921
13	Wolverhampton Wanderers	3–2	Stoke	8 January 1921
14	Sunderland	0–1	Cardiff City	8 January 1921
15	Derby County	2–0	Middlesbrough	8 January 1921
16	Luton Town	2–1	Birmingham	8 January 1921
17	Everton	1–0	Stockport County	8 January 1921
18	Swindon Town	1–0	Sheffield United	8 January 1921
19	Newcastle United	1–1	Nottingham Forest	8 January 1921
Replay	Newcastle United	2–0	Nottingham Forest	12 January 1921
20	Tottenham Hotspur	6–2	Bristol Rovers	8 January 1921
21	Queens Park Rangers	2–0	Arsenal	8 January 1921
22	Brentford	1–2	Huddersfield Town	8 January 1921
23	Northampton Town	0–0	Southampton	8 January 1921
Replay	Southampton	4–1	Northampton Town	12 January 1921
24	Brighton & Hove Albion	4–1	Oldham Athletic	8 January 1921
25	Plymouth Argyle	2–0	Rochdale	8 January 1921
26	Bradford City	3–1	Barnsley	8 January 1921
27	Millwall	0–3	Lincoln City	8 January 1921
28	Hull City	3–0	Bath City	8 January 1921
29	Crystal Palace	2–0	Manchester City	8 January 1921
30	Southend United	5–1	Eccles United	8 January 1921
31	Bradford Park Avenue	1–0	Clapton Orient	8 January 1921
32	Swansea Town	3–0	Bury	8 January 1921

== Second round proper ==
The 16 second round matches were played on Saturday, 29 January 1921. Five matches were drawn, with replays taking place in the following midweek fixture.

Tie no	Home team	Score	Away team	Date
1	Burnley	4–2	Queens Park Rangers	29 January 1921
2	Preston North End	4–1	Watford	29 January 1921
3	South Shields	0–4	Luton Town	29 January 1921
4	Notts County	0–0	Aston Villa	29 January 1921
Replay	Aston Villa	1–0	Notts County	2 February 1921
5	Grimsby Town	1–3	Southampton	29 January 1921
6	Derby County	1–1	Wolverhampton Wanderers	29 January 1921
Replay	Wolverhampton Wanderers	1–0	Derby County	2 February 1921
7	Lincoln City	0–0	Fulham	29 January 1921
Replay	Fulham	1–0	Lincoln City	2 February 1921
8	Everton	1–1	The Wednesday	29 January 1921
Replay	The Wednesday	0–1	Everton	2 February 1921
9	Swindon Town	0–2	Chelsea	29 January 1921
10	Newcastle United	1–0	Liverpool	29 January 1921
11	Tottenham Hotspur	4–0	Bradford City	29 January 1921
12	Brighton & Hove Albion	0–0	Cardiff City	29 January 1921
Replay	Cardiff City	1–0	Brighton & Hove Albion	2 February 1921
13	Crystal Palace	0–2	Hull City	29 January 1921
14	Southend United	1–0	Blackpool	29 January 1921
15	Bradford Park Avenue	0–1	Huddersfield Town	29 January 1921
16	Swansea Town	1–2	Plymouth Argyle	29 January 1921

== Third round proper ==
The eight third round matches were scheduled for Saturday, 19 February 1921. The Plymouth Argyle vs Chelsea match was drawn and went to a replay in the following midweek fixture. This was also drawn, and so a second replay was played the following week at Bristol City's Ashton Gate stadium.

Tie no	Home team	Score	Away team	Date
1	Southampton	0–1	Cardiff City	19 February 1921
2	Aston Villa	2–0	Huddersfield Town	19 February 1921
3	Luton Town	2–3	Preston North End	19 February 1921
4	Everton	3–0	Newcastle United	19 February 1921
5	Fulham	0–1	Wolverhampton Wanderers	19 February 1921
6	Plymouth Argyle	0–0	Chelsea	19 February 1921
Replay	Chelsea	0–0	Plymouth Argyle	23 February 1921
Replay	Chelsea	2–1	Plymouth Argyle	28 February 1921
7	Hull City	3–0	Burnley	19 February 1921
8	Southend United	1–4	Tottenham Hotspur	19 February 1921

== Fourth round proper ==
The four fourth round matches were scheduled for Saturday, 5 March 1921. There was one replay, between Hull City and Preston North End, played in the following midweek fixture.

Tie no	Home team	Score	Away team	Date
1	Everton	0–1	Wolverhampton Wanderers	5 March 1921
2	Tottenham Hotspur	1–0	Aston Villa	5 March 1921
3	Hull City	0–0	Preston North End	5 March 1921
Replay	Preston North End	1–0	Hull City	9 March 1921
4	Cardiff City	1–0	Chelsea	5 March 1921

== Semi-finals ==
The semi-final matches were played on Saturday, 19 March 1921. The Wolverhampton Wanderers–Cardiff City match was drawn and went to a replay four days later. Wolves won this, and went on to meet Tottenham Hotspur in the final.

19 March 1921
15:00

Wolverhampton Wanderers	0–0	Cardiff City

Anfield, Liverpool

Replay

23 March 1921
15:00

Wolverhampton Wanderers	3–1	Cardiff City

Old Trafford, Manchester

19 March 1921
15:00

Tottenham Hotspur	2–1	Preston North End

Hillsborough, Sheffield

== Final ==
The Final was contested by Tottenham Hotspur and Wolverhampton Wanderers at Stamford Bridge. Spurs won by a single goal, scored by Jimmy Dimmock, eight minutes into the second half. The cup was presented to the winning team by King George V.

=== Match details ===
23 April 1921

Tottenham Hotspur	1–0	Wolverhampton Wanderers
Dimmock 53'

Stamford Bridge, London
Attendance: 72,805
Referee: J. Davies (Rainhill)

Tottenham Hotspur	Wolverh'ton Wanderers

== See also ==
- FA Cup Final Results 1872-
