= List of Tottenham Hotspur F.C. players =

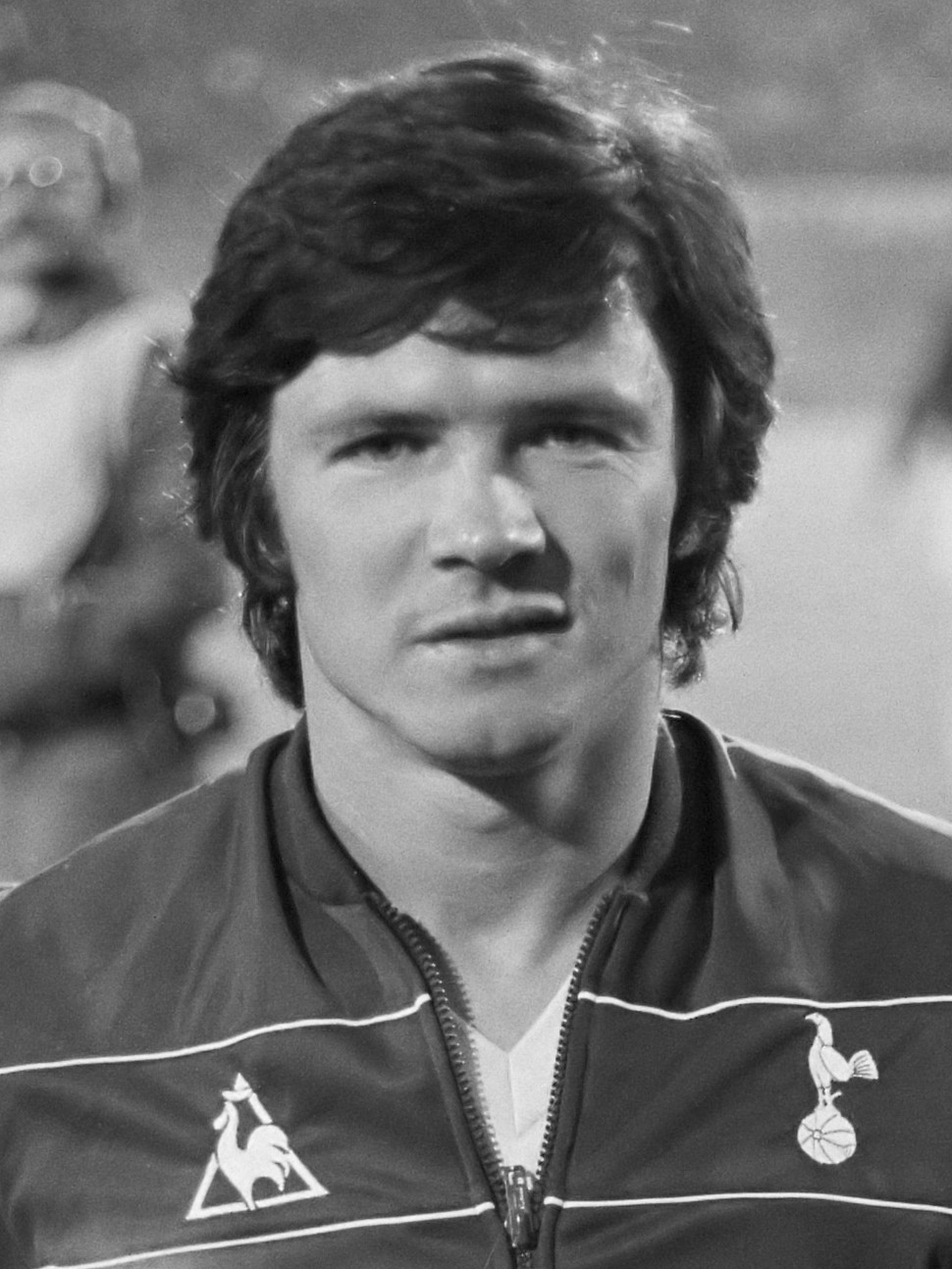
Steve Perryman holds the record of 854 appearances for Spurs.

This is a list of notable footballers who have played for Tottenham Hotspur since its foundation as Hotspur F.C. in 1882.

The list comprises those who have: -

- made 100 or more first-team appearances for the club including substitutions, and/or
- made 50 or more first-team and represented their country at full International level while on the club's books, and/or
- achieved notability through making a major contribution to the club as a player, e.g. club captain, founder member or achieved notability in other ways, e.g. Tony Parks.

Records for some players vary from one data source to another and where possible these have been verified with reference to more than one such source. Corrections and updates should include a reference to source in the edit summary or on the Talk Page. To see a list of all Tottenham players, major or minor, with a Wikipedia article Category:Tottenham Hotspur F.C. players.

== List of players ==
=== Key ===
Players are listed according to the date of their first-team debut for the club. First team appearances include, Football League, Premier League, FA Cup, League Cup, FA Community Shield, UEFA Champions League, UEFA Cup Winners' Cup, Inter-Cities Fairs Cup and UEFA Cup. Substitute appearances are included. Wartime matches are excluded.

International appearances are those at Full International level, including substitutions while on the club's books.

Positions
GK	Goalkeeper	DF	Defender	RB	Right back	MF	Midfielder	RW	Right winger
CB	Central back	FB	Fullback	LB	Left back	FW	Forward	LW	Left winger

Tottenham Hotspur Greats or have been inducted into the club's Hall of Fame.
Players who have achieved notability through a major contribution to the club.
Club captains who have won a major senior competition.
Club record holder.

An asterisk (*) next to a name denotes that the player is still a current player at the club.

This is a list of notable players for Tottenham Hotspur. Please do not add the names and details of the current squad unless it meets the notability criteria above.

== Table of notable players ==
Name	Nationality	Position	Tottenham Hotspur career	Club Apps	Goals	Int. Apps (at club)	Int. Apps (all)	Notes
Bobby Buckle	England	MF	1882–1895	53	25			
Jack Jull	England	FB	1882–1894	159	24			
Charles Ambler	England	GK	1894–1895; 1896–1900	133	0			
Jack L. Jones	Wales	MF	1897–1904	226	13	15	17	
John Cameron	Scotland	FW	1898–1907	111	43	0	1	
Ted Hughes	Wales	DF	1899–1905	148	8	6	14	
Jack Kirwan	Ireland	LW	1899–1905	347	97	12	1	
Tom Morris	England	MF	1899–1912	523	3			
Sandy Brown	Scotland	FW	1900–1901	57	45			
Vivian Woodward	England	FW	1901–1909	197	63	21	28	
John Brearley	England	FW	1903–1907	133	24			
Charlie O'Hagan	Ireland	FW	1903–1907	36	7	5	11	
Danny Steel	Scotland	CB	1908–1912	141	4			
Bobby Steel	Scotland	FW	1908–1915	245	45			
Jabez Darnell	England	CB	1908–1919	160	3			
Bert Middlemiss	England	LW	1908–1920	261	55			
Billy Minter	England	FW	1908–1920	334	101			
Walter Tull	England	FW	1909–1911	10	2			
Tom Collins	Scotland	FB	1910–1915	122	1			
Charlie Rance	England	CB	1910–1921	110	1			
Findlay Weir	Scotland	MF	1912–1917	101	2			
Bert Bliss	England	FW	1912–1922	215	106	1	1	
Jimmy Cantrell	England	FW	1912–1923	176	84			
Arthur Grimsdell	England	MF	1912–1927	360	27	6	6	
Fanny Walden	England	RW	1913–1924	237	24	2	2	
Bill Jaques	England	GK	1914–1922	138	0			
Thomas Clay	England	FB	1914–1929	351	24	4	4	
Jimmy Archibald	Scotland	MF	1919–1921	24	1			
Charlie Walters	England	MF	1919–1925	117	0			
Jimmy Dimmock	England	LW	1919–1931	438	112	3	3	
Alex Lindsay	Scotland	FW	1919–1930	224	48			
Bob McDonald	Scotland	CB	1920–1923	125	0			
Jimmy Seed	England	FW	1920–1927	254	77	5	5	
Charlie Handley	England	FW	1921–1928	141	29			
Matt Forster	England	FB	1921–1930	244	0			
Andy Thompson	England	MF	1921–1930	166	22			
Bert Smith	England	MF	1921–1931	319	10	2	2	
Jack Elkes	England	MF	1923–1929	200	50			
Cecil Poynton	England	FB	1923–1933	158	3			
Frank Osborne	England	FW	1924–1931	220	82	2	4	
Harry Skitt	England	MF	1924–1931	229	0			
Cyril Spiers	England	GK	1927–1932	169	0			
Taffy O'Callaghan	Wales	FW	1927–1935	263	99	11	11	
Joe Nicholls	England	GK	1927–1936	129	0			
Tommy Meads	England	MF	1929–1935	189	6			
Tom Evans	Wales	MF	1929–1936	101	4			
Willie Davies	Wales	RW	1930–1933	115	19			
Walter Alsford	England	LW	1930–1936	90	0	1	1	
George Hunt	England	FW	1930–1937	198	138	3	3	
Les Howe	England	MF	1930–1939	182	28			
Willie Evans	Wales	FW	1931–1936	195	86	6	6	
Arthur Rowe	England	MF	1931–1938	201	0	1	1	
Willie Hall	England	FW	1932–1939	222	29	10	10	
Bill Whatley	Wales	FB	1932–1939	254	2	3	3	
Johnny Morrison	England	CF	1932–1946	154	101			
Jimmy McCormick	England	RW	1932–1946	150	28			
Fred Channell	England	FB	1933–1936	109	1			
Andy Duncan	Scotland	FW	1934–1943	103	26			
Percy Hooper	England	GK	1934–1945	108	0			
Fred Sargent	England	RW	1934–1946	109	31			
Vic Buckingham	England	FB	1935–1949	230	1			
Ralph Ward	England	FB	1936–1946	132	11			
Freddie Cox	England	RW	1938–1949	105	18			
Bill Nicholson	England	MF	1938–1954	341	6	1	1	
Les Medley	England	LW	1939–1953	164	46	6	6	
Ron Burgess	Wales	MF	1939–1954	324	16	32	32	
Sid Tickridge	England	FB	1946–1951	101	0			
Les Bennett	England	FW	1946–1954	294	117			
Arthur Willis	England	FB	1946–1954	160	1	1	1	
Ted Ditchburn	England	GK	1946–1958	452	0	6	6	
Ernie Jones	Wales	FW	1947–1949	57	14	?	4	
Eddie Baily	England	FW	1947–1955	325	69	9	9	
Len Duquemin	Guernsey	FW	1947–1957	307	134			
Sonny Walters	England	MF	1947–1957	234	71			
Charlie Withers	England	FB	1948–1956	164	2			
Alf Ramsey	England	FB	1949–1955	250	25	31	32	
Harry Clarke	England	CB	1949–1956	322	4	1	1	
Tony Marchi	England	MF	1949–1957; 1959–1965	232	7			
Tommy Harmer	England	FW	1951–1960	222	51			
George Robb	England	LW	1952–1958	200	58	1	1	
Mel Hopkins	Wales	LB	1952–1964	240	0	34	34	
Johnny Brooks	England	FW	1953–1959	179	51	3	3	
John White	Scotland	FW	1959–1964	183	40	22	22	
Peter Baker	England	RB	1953–1965	342	3			
Danny Blanchflower	Northern Ireland	MF	1954–1963	382	21	41	56	
Bobby Smith	England	FW	1955–1964	317	208	15	15	
Terry Dyson	England	FW	1955–1965	209	55			
Eddie Clayton	England	MF	1954–1967	102	20			
Ron Henry	England	LB	1955–1965	287	1	1	1	
Maurice Norman	England	MF	1955–1965	411	19	23	23	
Terry Medwin	Wales	FW	1956–1963	215	72	?	30	
Cliff Jones	Wales	LW	1958–1968	378	159	?	58	
Les Allen	England	FW	1959–1965	137	61			
Bill Brown	Scotland	GK	1959–1966	262	0	29	29	
Dave Mackay	Scotland	MF	1959–1968	318	51	22	22	
Frank Saul	England	FW	1960–1967	129	44			
Jimmy Greaves	England	FW	1961–1970	379	266	42	57	
Phil Beal	England	DF	1963–1975	420	1			
Jimmy Robertson	Scotland	RW	1964–1968	181	31	1	1	
Alan Mullery	England	MF	1964–1972	374	30	35	35	
Alan Gilzean	Scotland	FW	1964–1974	439	133	17	22	
Cyril Knowles	England	LB	1964–1975	506	17	4	4	
Pat Jennings	Northern Ireland	GK	1964–1977	590	1	71	119	
Terry Venables	England	MF	1966–1969	141	9	0	2	
Mike England	Wales	CB	1966–1975	397	19	?	44	
Joe Kinnear	Republic of Ireland	RB	1966–1975	258	2	26	26	
Peter Collins	England	CB	1968–1972	101	5			
Jimmy Pearce	England	FW	1968–1973	193	35			
Martin Chivers	England	FW	1968–1976	367	174	24	24	
Ray Evans	England	FB	1969–1975	181	4			
John Pratt	England	MF	1969–1980	415	49			
Steve Perryman	England	MF	1969–1986	854	39	1	1	
Martin Peters	England	MF	1970–1975	260	76	34	67	
Jimmy Neighbour	England	FW	1970–1976	156	11			
Terry Naylor	England	DF	1970–1980	301	4			
Ralph Coates	England	MF	1971–1977	248	23	4	2	
Barry Daines	England	GK	1971–1981	173	0			
John Duncan	Scotland	FW	1974–1978	120	62			
Keith Osgood	England	CB	1974–1978	127	14			
Chris Jones	Jersey	FW	1974–1982	185	42			
Don McAllister	England	DF	1975–1981	202	10			
Glenn Hoddle	England	MF	1975–1987	490	110	44	53	
Gerry Armstrong	Northern Ireland	FW	1976–1980	98	16	27	63	
Peter Taylor	England	LW	1976–1980	140	33			
Jimmy Holmes	Republic of Ireland	LB	1977–1981	92	2	13	30	
Ricardo Villa	Argentina	MF	1978–1983	179	25	?	25	
John Lacy	England	CB	1978–1983	152	3			
Ossie Ardiles	Argentina	MF	1978–1982; 1983–1988	311	25	?	53	
Terry Yorath	Wales	MF	1979–1981	62	1	6	59	
Mark Falco	England	FW	1979–1986	236	89			
Tony Galvin	Republic of Ireland	MF	1979–1987	273	31	19	29	
Paul Miller	England	DF	1979–1987	285	10			
Chris Hughton	Republic of Ireland	FB	1979–1990	398	19	44	53	
Steve Archibald	Scotland	FW	1980–1984	189	77	19	27	
Garth Crooks	England	FW	1980–1985	182	75			
Graham Roberts	England	CD	1980–1986	287	35	6	6	
Tony Parks	England	GK	1980–1988	37	0	0	0	
Micky Hazard	England	MF	1980–1985; 1993–1995	170	25			
Paul Price	Wales	CD	1981–1984	62	0	12	25	
Ray Clemence	England	GK	1981–1987	330	0	5	61	
Gary Mabbutt	England	DF	1982–1998	611	38	16	16	
Gary Stevens	England	DF	1983–1987	200	8	7	7	
Danny Thomas	England	DF	1983–1987	116	1	0	2	
John Chiedozie	Nigeria	RW	1984–1986	75	14	2	9	
Clive Allen	England	FW	1984–1988	135	84	5	5	
Chris Waddle	England	LW	1985–1989	173	42	36	62	
Paul Allen	England	MF	1985–1993	370	28			
Richard Gough	Scotland	DF	1986–1987	65	2	7	61	
Nico Claesen	Belgium	FW	1986–1988	63	23	10	36	
Steve Hodge	England	MF	1986–1988	54	9	4	24	
Mitchell Thomas	England	FB	1986–1991	157	6			
Vinny Samways	England	MF	1987–1994	247	17			
Paul Gascoigne	England	MF	1988–1991	112	33	20	57	
Paul Stewart	England	FW	1988–1992	171	37	3	3	
Paul Walsh	England	FW	1988–1992	156	21	0	5	
Terry Fenwick	England	DF	1988–1993	118	10	1	20	
Guðni Bergsson	Iceland	DF	1988–1994	86	2	34	80	
Erik Thorstvedt	Norway	GK	1988–1996	218	0	45	97	
David Howells	England	MF	1988–1998	335	27			
Gary Lineker	England	FW	1989–1992	106	67	21	80	
Pat Van Den Hauwe	Wales	DF	1989–1993	145	0	0	13	
Nayim	Spain	MF	1989–1993	144	18			
Steve Sedgley	England	CB	1989–1994	211	11			
Justin Edinburgh	England	FB	1990–2000	276	1			
Gordon Durie	Scotland	FW	1991–1993	78	17	11	43	
Ian Walker	England	GK	1991–2001	313	0	3	4	
Nicky Barmby	England	FW	1992–1995	108	27	2	23	
Dean Austin	England	FB	1992–1997	150	0			
Sol Campbell	England	CB	1992–2001	315	15	40	73	
Teddy Sheringham	England	FW	1992–1997; 2001–2003	277	125	21	51	
Darren Anderton	England	RW	1992–2004	358	48	30	30	
Colin Calderwood	Scotland	DF	1993–1999	199	7	32	36	
Stephen Carr	Republic of Ireland	RB	1993–2004	270	8	27	44	
Ronnie Rosenthal	Israel	FW	1994–1997	100	11	19	60	
Jürgen Klinsmann	Germany	FW	1994–1995; 1997–1998	68	38	10	108	
Ruel Fox	Montserrat	RW	1995–2000	129	15	0	2	
Chris Armstrong	England	FW	1995–2002	173	62			
Andy Sinton	England	MF	1996–1999	100	7	0	12	
Allan Nielsen	Denmark	MF	1996–2000	115	18	7	44	
Steffen Iversen	Norway	FW	1996–2003	176	47	34	79	
David Ginola	France	LW	1997–2000	127	22	0	17	
Stephen Clemence	England	MF	1997–2003	109	3			
Les Ferdinand	England	FW	1997–2003	149	39	4	17	
Øyvind Leonhardsen	Norway	MF	1999–2002	72	11	18	86	
Steffen Freund	Germany	MF	1999–2003	131	0	0	21	
Chris Perry	England	DF	1999–2003	146	4			
Tim Sherwood	England	MF	1999–2003	118	16	3	3	
Mauricio Taricco	Argentina	DF	1999–2004	156	2			
Ledley King	England	CB	1999–2012	318	12	21	21	
Neil Sullivan	Scotland	GK	2000–2003	81	0	13	28	
Gary Doherty	Republic of Ireland	CB	2000–2004	77	8	24	34	
Serhii Rebrov	Ukraine	FW	2000–2004	76	13	29	75	
Simon Davies	Wales	MF	2000–2005	146	18	24	58	
Anthony Gardner	England	CB	2000–2008	144	3	1	1	
Gus Poyet	Uruguay	MF	2001–2004	98	23	0	26	
Christian Ziege	Germany	FB	2001–2004	55	10	13	72	
Kasey Keller	United States	GK	2001–2005	85	0	25	102	
Jamie Redknapp	England	MF	2002–2005	49	4	0	17	
Robbie Keane	Republic of Ireland	FW	2002–2008; 2009–2011	306	122	51	146	
Frédéric Kanouté	Mali	FW	2003–2005	73	21	11	39	
Michael Carrick	England	MF	2004–2006	75	2	5	34	
Paul Robinson	England	GK	2004–2008	175	1	37	41	
Jermain Defoe	England	FW	2004–2008; 2009–2014	363	143	45	57	
Mido	Egypt	FW	2005–2007	63	20	13	51	
Teemu Tainio	Finland	MF	2005–2008	83	3	11	64	
Lee Young-pyo	South Korea	LB	2005–2008	93	0	30	127	
Tom Huddlestone	England	MF	2005–2013	209	15	3	3	
Jermaine Jenas	England	MF	2005–2013	202	26	9	21	
Michael Dawson	England	CB	2005–2014	324	10	4	4	
Aaron Lennon	England	RW	2005–2015	364	30	21	21	
Dimitar Berbatov	Bulgaria	FW	2006–2008	102	46	17	78	
Pascal Chimbonda	France	RB	2006–2008; 2009–2009	103	4	0	1	
Didier Zokora	Ivory Coast	MF	2006–2009	134	0	22	123	
Benoît Assou-Ekotto	Cameroon	LB	2006–2015	200	4	19	24	
Darren Bent	England	FW	2007–2009	79	25	2	13	
Gareth Bale	Wales	LW	2007–2013; 2020–2021	237	72	46	111	
Younès Kaboul	France	DF	2007–2008; 2010–2015	153	8	4	6	
Alan Hutton	Scotland	RB	2008–2011	66	2	11	50	
Jonathan Woodgate	England	CB	2008–2011	65	3	2	8	
Vedran Ćorluka	Croatia	DF	2008–2012	109	1	11	103	
Giovani dos Santos	Mexico	MF	2008–2012	33	3	54	107	
Niko Kranjčar	Croatia	MF	2008–2012	71	11	6	81	
Luka Modrić	Croatia	MF	2008–2012	159	17	34	194	
Roman Pavlyuchenko	Russia	FW	2008–2012	113	42	11	51	
David Bentley	England	RW	2008–2013	62	5	1	7	
Heurelho Gomes	Brazil	GK	2008–2014	130	0	2	11	
Andros Townsend	England	RW	2008–2016	93	11	10	13	
Ryan Mason	England	MF	2008–2016	70	4	1	1	
Peter Crouch	England	FW	2009–2011	93	24	8	42	
Wilson Palacios	Honduras	MF	2009–2011	86	1	15	98	
Sébastien Bassong	Cameroon	CB	2009–2012	71	3	13	19	
Kyle Walker	England	RB	2010–2017	228	4	27	96	
Rafael van der Vaart	Netherlands	MF	2010–2012	78	28	13	109	
Sandro	Brazil	MF	2010–2014	96	3	15	17	
Danny Rose	England	LB	2010–2020	214	10	29	29	
Scott Parker	England	MF	2011–2013	63	0	15	18	
Emmanuel Adebayor	Togo	FW	2011–2015	113	42	14	87	
Harry Kane	England	FW	2011–2023	435	280	84	112	
Gylfi Sigurðsson	Iceland	MF	2012–2014	83	13	15	83	
Mousa Dembélé	Belgium	MF	2012–2018	249	10	42	82	
Hugo Lloris	France	GK	2012–2024	447	0	107	145	
Jan Vertonghen	Belgium	CB	2012–2020	315	14	80	157	
Harry Winks	England	MF	2013–2023	203	5	10	10	
Paulinho	Brazil	MF	2013–2015	67	10	14	56	
Christian Eriksen	Denmark	MF	2013–2020	304	69	58	147	
Nabil Bentaleb	Algeria	MF	2013–2016	66	1	25	57	
Nacer Chadli	Belgium	MF	2013–2016	119	25	19	66	
Roberto Soldado	Spain	FW	2013–2015	76	16	1	12	
Erik Lamela	Argentina	MF	2013–2021	257	37	24	25	
Eric Dier	England	MF	2014–2024	365	13	49	49	
Ben Davies*	Wales	LB	2014–present	363	11	90	100	
Toby Alderweireld	Belgium	CB	2015–2021	236	9	65	127	
Dele Alli	England	MF	2015–2022	269	67	37	37	
Son Heung-min	South Korea	FW	2015–2025	454	173	91	140	
Kieran Trippier	England	FB	2015–2019	114	2	16	54	
Moussa Sissoko	France	MF	2016–2021	202	5	26	71	
Victor Wanyama	Kenya	MF	2016–2020	97	7	18	65	
Davinson Sánchez	Colombia	DF	2017–2023	207	5	52	75	
Serge Aurier	Ivory Coast	RB	2017–2021	110	8	33	93	
Lucas Moura	Brazil	MF	2018–2023	221	39	1	37	
Giovani Lo Celso	Argentina	MF	2019–2024	108	10	45	65	
Tanguy Ndombele	France	MF	2019–2024	91	10	1	7	
Steven Bergwijn	Netherlands	MF	2020–2022	83	8	12	35	
Pierre-Emile Hojbjerg	Denmark	MF	2020–2025	184	10	48	93	
Sergio Reguilón	Spain	DF	2020–2025	73	2	3	6	
Matt Doherty	Republic of Ireland	DF	2020–2023	71	3	24	53	
Pape Matar Sarr*	Senegal	MF	2021–present	141	11	35	37	
Emerson Royal	Brazil	DF	2021–2024	101	4	6	10	
Cristian Romero	Argentina	DF	2021–2026	156	13	42	47	
Rodrigo Bentancur*	Uruguay	MF	2022–present	147	10	27	73	
Dejan Kulusevski*	Sweden	MF	2022–present	146	25	25	45	
Ivan Perisic	Croatia	MF	2022–2024	50	1	18	150	
Richarlison*	Brazil	FW	2022–present	133	32	18	54	
Brennan Johnson	Wales	FW	2023–2026	107	27	22	42	
Micky van de Ven*	Netherlands	DF	2023–present	96	10	17	17	
James Maddison*	England	MF	2023–present	78	16	2	7	
Pedro Porro*	Spain	MF	2023–present	152	13	14	15	
Dominic Solanke*	England	FW	2024–present	65	22	2	3	
Lucas Bergvall*	Sweden	MF	2024–present	78	2	5	6	
Wilson Odobert*	France	MF	2024–present	54	5			
Mohammed Kudus*	Ghana	MF	2025–present	21	2			
Mathys Tel*	France	FW	2025–present	46	6			
Xavi Simons*	Netherlands	FW	2025–present	41	5			
Conor Gallagher*	England	MF	2026–present	18	1			

^{Note: Players correct up to the 2026 September transfer window. Premier League and International statistics correct up to 14 July 2026.}

== Club captains ==
Dates	Captain
1882–1883	(England) Bobby Buckle
1884–1894	(England) Jack Jull
1895–1896	(England) Stanley Briggs
1897–1904	(Wales) Jack L. Jones
1904–1907	(Scotland) Sandy Tait
1907-1908	(England) Walter Bull
1908–1912	(Scotland) Danny Steel
1912–1914	(Scotland) Tom Collins
1914–1915	(Scotland) Bobby Steel
1919	(England) Billy Minter
1919-1920	(England) Thomas Clay
1920–1929	(England) Arthur Grimsdell
1929–1930	(England) Cecil Poynton
1930–1932	(England) Tommy Meads
1932–1933	(England) Billy Felton
1933–1935	(England) Arthur Rowe
1935–1936	(England) Les Howe
1936–1937	(Wales) Bill Whatley
1937–1939	(England) Willie Hall
1946–1954	(Wales) Ron Burgess
1954–1955	(England) Alf Ramsey
1955–1956	(Northern Ireland) Danny Blanchflower
1956–1957	(England) Tony Marchi
1957–1958	(Scotland) John Ryden
1958–1959	(England) Bobby Smith
1959–1964	(Northern Ireland) Danny Blanchflower
1964–1968	(Scotland) Dave Mackay
1968–1972	(England) Alan Mullery
1972–1975	(England) Martin Peters
1975–1986	(England) Steve Perryman
1986	(England) Ray Clemence
1987	(Scotland) Richard Gough
1987–1998	(England) Gary Mabbutt
1998–2001	(England) Sol Campbell
2001–2003	(England) Teddy Sheringham
2003–2005	(England) Jamie Redknapp
2005–2012	(England) Ledley King
2012–2014	(England) Michael Dawson
2014–2015	(France) Younes Kaboul
2015–2023	(France) Hugo Lloris
2023–2025	(South Korea) Son Heung-min
2025–2026	(Argentina) Cristian Romero
2026–	(Netherlands) Micky van de Ven
