= 1907–08 Tottenham Hotspur F.C. season =

English football club season

Tottenham Hotspur
1907–08 season
- Manager: Fred Kirkham
- Stadium: White Hart Lane
- Southern League: 7th
- Western League: 2nd
- FA Cup: Third round
- Top goalscorer: Vivian Woodward (10)
- Biggest win: 10–0 v Bristol Rovers; 9 September 1907; Western League
- Biggest defeat: 3–0 v Millwall; 25 November 1907; Western League; 3–0 v Brentford; 14 March 1908; Southern League

The 1907–08 season was Tottenham's twelfth season as a fully professional club and the 25th year in existence. They competed in two leagues, the main being the Southern Football League with a midweek game in the Western League along with competing in the FA Cup.

This was Tottenham's final season in these two leagues as they would be elected to the Football League for the 1908–09 season.

Tottenham appointed a referee Fred Kirkham as team manager right at the end of the previous season with two matches left to play in April 1907. Kirkham went to serve the club in this capacity for the 1907–08 season.

Tottenham had an uneventful campaign in the Southern League and finished in seventh place. The reserves fared much better in the Western League B table. The start of the campaign Tottenham beat Bristol Rovers in a whopping 10–0 affair and by the end of the season had finished in second place.

In the FA Cup Tottenham went away to Everton in the first round and lost 1–0.

== Squad ==
Note: Flags indicate national team as defined under FIFA eligibility rules; some limited exceptions apply. Players may hold more than one non-FIFA nationality.

Pos.	Nation	Player
GK	ENG	Gordon Manning
GK	ENG	John Whitbourne
DF	ENG	Walter Bull
DF	ENG	Oliver Burton
DF	ENG	Arthur Dixon
DF	SCO	Jack Chaplin
DF	ENG	Ernie Coquet
DF	ENG	Jabez Darnell
DF	ENG	Fred Massey
DF	SCO	Danny Steel
DF	SCO	Sandy Tait
DF	SCO	John Watson
MF	ENG	Tom Morris
MF	ENG	Alfred Whyman
MF	ENG	James Gray

Pos.	Nation	Player
MF	ENG	Bert Middlemiss
MF	WAL	Ted Hughes
MF	GER	Max Seeburg
MF	ENG	Robert Walker
FW	ENG	Harold Stansfield
FW	ENG	George Payne
FW	ENG	Arthur Pickett
FW	GBR	Jimmy Pass
FW	ENG	Joe Walton
FW	SCO	William McNair
FW	ENG	Billy Minter
FW	ENG	Charlie Woodruff
FW	SCO	James Reid
FW	ENG	Vivian Woodward

== Transfers ==
Gordon Manning was Kirkham's first signing in May 1907 and went on to play a total of 49 appearances for the club. He was then released at the end of the season. Bert Middlemiss was signed from Stalybridge Rovers however he had a signed professional contract with Stockport County and Tottenham had to pay an unknown fee to them.

=== In ===
Date from	Position	Nationality	Name	From	Fee	Ref.
1907	DF	(England)	Fred Massey	Leyton	Unknown	
May 1907	GK	(England)	Gordon Manning	Preston North End	Unknown	
May 1907	DF	(England)	Arthur Dixon	Burnley	Unknown	
May 1907	MF	(England)	James Gray	Rangers	Free	
May 1907	FW	(Scotland)	William McNair	Falkirk	Unknown	
May 1907	FW	(United Kingdom)	Jimmy Pass	Stockport County	Unknown	
May 1907	MF	(Germany)	Max Seeburg	Chelsea	Unknown	
November 1907	MF	(England)	Bert Middlemiss	Stockport County	Unknown	
March 1908	DF	(England)	Ernie Coquet	Reading	Unknown	
March 1908	FW	(England)	Billy Minter	Reading	Unknown	
March 1908	FW	(England)	Charlie Woodruff	Grantham Avenue	Unknown	

=== Out ===
Date	Position	Nationality	Name	To	Fee	Ref.
March 1908	FW	(United Kingdom)	Jimmy Pass	New Brompton	Unknown	

== Competitions ==
=== Southern League ===
==== Table ====
Pos	Team	Pld	W	D	L	GF	GA	GR	Pts	Promotion
5	Swindon Town	38	16	10	12	55	40	1.375	42	
6	Bristol Rovers	38	16	10	12	59	56	1.054	42	
7	Tottenham Hotspur	38	17	7	14	59	48	1.229	41	Elected to the Football League Second Division
8	Northampton Town	38	15	11	12	50	41	1.220	41	
9	Portsmouth	38	17	6	15	64	52	1.231	40	

Rules for classification: The system of using goal average to separate two teams tied on points was used until the 1976-77 season. The points system: 2 points for a win, 1 point for a draw and 0 points for losing.

==== Results ====
1 September 1907 1	Queens Park Rangers	3–3	Tottenham Hotspur	Park Royal, London
			McNair	Stadium: Park Royal Ground

7 September 1907 2	West Ham United	1–1	Tottenham Hotspur	Upton Park, London
				Stadium: Boleyn Ground

14 September 1907 3	Tottenham Hotspur	3–2	Queens Park Rangers	Tottenham, London
				Stadium: White Hart Lane

21 September 1907 4	Tottenham Hotspur	2–1	New Brompton	Tottenham, London
				Stadium: White Hart Lane; Attendance: 16,000

28 September 1907 5	Swindon Town	1–0	Tottenham Hotspur	Swindon, Wiltshire
				Stadium: County Ground

5 October 1907 6	Tottenham Hotspur	1–2	Crystal Palace	Tottenham, London
			Innerd; Needham	Stadium: White Hart Lane; Attendance: 17,000

12 October 1907 7	Luton Town	3–1	Tottenham Hotspur	Luton, Bedfordshire
				Stadium: Kenilworth Road

19 October 1907 8	Tottenham Hotspur	1–1	Brighton & Hove Albion	Tottenham, London
				Stadium: White Hart Lane

26 October 1907 9	Portsmouth	1–2	Tottenham Hotspur	Portsmouth, Wiltshire
				Stadium: Fratton Park

2 November 1907 10	Tottenham Hotspur	1–1	Bradford Park Avenue	Tottenham, London
				Stadium: White Hart Lane

9 November 1907 11	Millwall	1–2	Tottenham Hotspur	Isle of Dogs, London
				Stadium: North Greenwich

16 November 1907 12	Tottenham Hotspur	1–0	Brentford	Tottenham, London
				Stadium: White Hart Lane

23 November 1907 13	Bristol Rovers	0–0	Tottenham Hotspur	Eastville, Bristol
				Stadium: Eastville Stadium

30 November 1907 14	Tottenham Hotspur	1–0	Leyton	Tottenham, London
				Stadium: White Hart Lane

7 December 1907 15	Reading	3–1	Tottenham Hotspur	Reading, Berkshire
				Stadium: Elm Park

14 December 1907 16	Tottenham Hotspur	5–0	Watford	Tottenham, London
				Stadium: White Hart Lane

21 December 1907 17	Tottenham Hotspur	3–0	Norwich City	Tottenham, London
				Stadium: White Hart Lane

25 December 1907 18	Tottenham Hotspur	2–0	Northampton Town	Tottenham, London
				Stadium: White Hart Lane

26 December 1907 19	Southampton	1–1	Tottenham Hotspur	Southampton, Wiltshire
				Stadium: The Dell

28 December 1907 20	Northampton Town	2–1	Tottenham Hotspur	Northampton, Northamptonshire
				Stadium: County Cricket Ground

4 January 1908 21	Tottenham Hotspur	3–2	West Ham United	Tottenham, London
				Stadium: White Hart Lane

18 January 1908 22	New Brompton	1–2	Tottenham Hotspur	Gillingham, Kent
	Smith			Stadium: Priestfield Stadium; Attendance: 5,000

20 January 1908 23	Tottenham Hotspur	0–1	Plymouth Argyle	Tottenham, London
				Stadium: White Hart Lane

25 January 1908 24	Tottenham Hotspur	1–0	Swindon Town	Tottenham, London
				Stadium: White Hart Lane

8 February 1908 25	Tottenham Hotspur	1–2	Luton Town	Tottenham, London
				Stadium: White Hart Lane

12 February 1908 26	Crystal Palace	0–2	Tottenham Hotspur	Crystal Palace, London
				Stadium: Crystal Palace Stadium; Attendance: 8,000

15 February 1908 27	Brighton & Hove Albion	2–0	Tottenham Hotspur	Hove, East Sussex
				Stadium: Goldstone Ground

29 February 1908 28	Bradford Park Avenue	1–2	Tottenham Hotspur	Bradford, Yorkshire

7 March 1908 29	Tottenham Hotspur	1–2	Millwall	Tottenham, London
				Stadium: White Hart Lane

14 March 1908 30	Brentford	3–0	Tottenham Hotspur	Brentford, London
	Bowman			Stadium: Griffin Park

21 March 1908 31	Tottenham Hotspur	1–2	Bristol Rovers	Tottenham, London
				Stadium: White Hart Lane

28 March 1908 32	Leyton	2–5	Tottenham Hotspur	Leyton, London
				Stadium: Leyton Stadium

4 April 1908 33	Tottenham Hotspur	2–0	Reading	Tottenham, London
				Stadium: White Hart Lane

6 April 1908 34	Tottenham Hotspur	2–3	Portsmouth	Tottenham, London
				Stadium: White Hart Lane

11 April 1908 35	Watford	2–2	Tottenham Hotspur	Watford, Hertfordshire
				Stadium: Cassio Road

17 April 1908 36	Tottenham Hotspur	3–0	Southampton	Tottenham, London
				Stadium: White Hart Lane

18 April 1908 37	Norwich City	2–1	Tottenham Hotspur	Norwich, Norfolk
				Stadium: Newmarket Road

20 April 1908 38	Plymouth Argyle	1–0	Tottenham Hotspur	Plymouth, Devon
				Stadium: Home Park

=== Western League ===
==== Table ====
Pos	Team	Pld	W	D	L	GF	GA	GAv	Pts	Result
1	Millwall	12	9	2	1	31	15	2.067	20	
2	Tottenham Hotspur	12	7	0	5	26	13	2.000	14	Elected to the Football League Second Division
3	Bristol Rovers	12	6	2	4	22	29	0.759	14	
4	Luton Town	12	4	4	4	16	21	0.762	12	
5	Reading	12	4	3	5	20	25	0.800	11	
6	Crystal Palace	12	3	4	5	16	17	0.941	10	
7	West Ham United	12	1	1	10	16	27	0.593	3	

==== Results ====
9 September 1907 1	Tottenham Hotspur	10–0	Bristol Rovers	Tottenham, London
				Stadium: White Hart Lane

18 September 1907 2	Bristol Rovers	2–1	Tottenham Hotspur	Bristol
				Stadium: Memorial Stadium

23 September 1907 3	Millwall	2–0	Tottenham Hotspur	Isle of Dogs, London
				Stadium: North Greenwich

2 October 1907 4	Reading	1–2	Tottenham Hotspur	Reading, Berkshire
				Stadium: White Hart Lane

7 October 1907 5	Tottenham Hotspur	2–1	West Ham United	Tottenham, London
				Stadium: White Hart Lane

14 October 1907 6	Tottenham Hotspur	0–2	Reading	Tottenham, London
				Stadium: White Hart Lane

23 October 1907 7	Crystal Palace	2–0	Tottenham Hotspur	Crystal Palace, London
				Stadium: Crystal Palace Stadium

4 November 1907 8	West Ham United	1–3	Tottenham Hotspur	Upton Park, London
				Stadium: Boleyn Ground

25 November 1907 9	Tottenham Hotspur	0–3	Millwall	Tottenham, London
				Stadium: White Hart Lane

2 December 1907 10	Tottenham Hotspur	1–0	Crystal Palace	Tottenham, London
				Stadium: White Hart Lane

9 December 1907 11	Luton Town	1–5	Tottenham Hotspur	Luton, Bedfordshire
				Stadium: Kenilworth Road

16 December 1907 12	Tottenham Hotspur	2–0	Luton Town	Tottenham, London
				Stadium: White Hart Lane

=== FA Cup ===
==== Results ====
11 January 1908 First round	Everton	1–0	Tottenham Hotspur	Walton, Liverpool
				Stadium: Goodison Park; Attendance: 21,000

== Notes ==
- The results are compiled from Phil Soar's Tottenham Hotspur The Official Illustrated History 1882–1995.

== Works cited ==
- Soar, Phil (1995). Tottenham Hotspur The Official Illustrated History 1882–1995. Hamlyn. ISBN 0-600-58706-1.
- Goodwin, Bob (1992). The Spurs Alphabet. ACL & Polar Publishing (UK) Ltd. ISBN 0-9514862-8-4.
