= 1908–09 Tottenham Hotspur F.C. season =

English football club season

Tottenham Hotspur
1908–09 season
- Manager: Arthur Turner
- Stadium: White Hart Lane
- Second Division: 2nd (promoted)
- FA Cup: Third round

The 1908–09 season was Tottenham's thirteenth season as a fully professional club and their 26th year in existence. Having been elected to the Football League they competed in the Second Division and in this first season gained promotion by finishing in second place. In the FA Cup Tottenham were drawn away to Manchester City in the first round and overcame a Tom Holford hat-trick to win the game 4–3. In the second round Tottenham were at home to Fulham and won 1–0 with a goal from Robert Steel. The third round, where they were drawn against Burnley, was a different story as this took two games, the first being at home ended in a draw, while at Turf Moor Tottenham lost 3–1 ending their run. Tottenham also competed in the newly created London Challenge Cup with a combination of first and reserve team players.

== Postseason ==
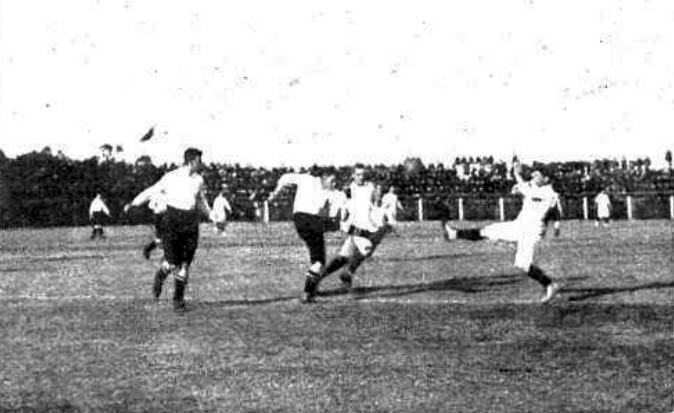
Argentina playing Tottenham on 13 June 1909

In June, after the season finished, Tottenham and Everton went on tour to Argentina and Uruguay in South America. The first game played was a display match between Everton and Tottenham which finished in a 2–2 draw. Tottenham then played against a combination of players formed from clubs in the Uruguayan league. The result was a resounding 8–0 to Tottenham. Three days later Tottenham played against what is recorded as the Argentina squad to a 1–0 win. Then three days after that they played against the Argentinian league's best eleven in a 4–1 win.

== Squad ==
Note: Flags indicate national team as defined under FIFA eligibility rules; some limited exceptions apply. Players may hold more than one non-FIFA nationality.

Pos.	Nation	Player
GK	ENG	Fred Boreham
GK	ENG	Robert Hewitson
DF	ENG	Walter Bull
DF	ENG	Oliver Burton
DF	SCO	Thomas Leslie
DF	ENG	Ernie Coquet
DF	ENG	Jabez Darnell
DF	SCO	Danny Steel
DF	SCO	John Watson
MF	ENG	Tom Morris
MF	ENG	Bert Middlemiss
MF	ENG	Jack Curtis

Pos.	Nation	Player
MF	GER	Max Seeburg
MF	ENG	Charlie Woodruff
FW	ENG	Frederick Massey
FW	ENG	Doug MacFarlane
FW	ENG	Joe Brough
FW	SCO	James Morton
FW	ENG	William Minter
FW	SCO	Robert Steel
FW	ENG	Percy Humphreys
FW	ENG	Charlie Woodruff
FW	ENG	Vivian Woodward

== Transfers ==
Having already signed Danny Steel the previous season, Spurs snapped up his younger brother Robert who was under contract with Greenock Morton in Scotland. In 1909 Vivian Woodward shocked Tottenham by announcing his retirement from football so he could play for Chelmsford City.

=== In ===
Date from	Position	Nationality	Name	From	Fee	Ref.
May 1908	GK	(England)	Fredrick Boreham	Leyton	Unknown	
May 1908	DF	(Scotland)	Thomas Leslie	Vale of Clyde	Unknown	
May 1908	FW	(Scotland)	Robert Steel	Greenock Morton	Unknown	
June 1908	FW	(England)	Doug MacFarlane	Burnley	Unknown	
June 1908	FW	(Scotland)	James Morton	Stoke	Unknown	
June 1908	GK	(England)	Robert Hewitson	Oldham Athletic	Unknown	
July 1908	FW	(England)	Joe Brough	Stoke	Unknown	
December 1908	FW	(England)	Percy Humphreys	Chelsea	Unknown	
April 1909	MF	(England)	Jack Curtis	Gainsborough Trinity	Unknown	

=== Out ===
Date	Position	Nationality	Name	To	Fee	Ref.
1909	FW	(England)	Vivian Woodward	Retired	N/A	

== Competitions ==
=== Second Division ===
==== Table ====
Pos	Team	Pld	W	D	L	GF	GA	GAv	Pts	Promotion or relegation
1	Bolton Wanderers (C, P)	38	24	4	10	59	28	2.107	52	Promotion to the First Division
2	Tottenham Hotspur (P)	38	20	11	7	67	32	2.094	51	Promotion to the First Division
3	West Bromwich Albion	38	19	13	6	56	27	2.074	51	
4	Hull City	38	19	6	13	63	39	1.615	44	
5	Derby County	38	16	11	11	55	41	1.341	43	

(C) Champions; (P) Promoted

==== Results ====
1 September 1908 1	Tottenham Hotspur	3–0	Wolverhampton Wanderers	Tottenham, London
				Stadium: White Hart Lane

5 September 1908 2	Leeds City	1–0	Tottenham Hotspur	Leeds, Yorkshire
				Stadium: Elland Road

12 September 1908 3	Tottenham Hotspur	4–0	Barnsley	Tottenham, London
				Stadium: White Hart Lane

19 September 1908 4	Tottenham Hotspur	2–1	Bolton Wanderers	Tottenham, London
				Stadium: White Hart Lane

26 September 1908 5	Hull City	1–0	Tottenham Hotspur	Kingston upon Hull, Yorkshire
				Stadium: Anlaby Road

3 October 1908 6	Tottenham Hotspur	0–0	Derby County	Tottenham, London
				Stadium: White Hart Lane

10 October 1908 7	Blackpool	1–1	Tottenham Hotspur	Blackpool, Lancashire
				Stadium: Bloomfield Road

17 October 1908 8	Tottenham Hotspur	4–0	Chesterfield	Tottenham, London
				Stadium: White Hart Lane

24 October 1908 9	Glossop North End	1–1	Tottenham Hotspur	Glossop, Derbyshire
				Stadium: North Road

31 October 1908 10	Tottenham Hotspur	0–0	Stockport County	Tottenham, London
				Stadium: White Hart Lane

7 November 1908 11	West Bromwich Albion	3–0	Tottenham Hotspur	West Bromwich, Staffordshire
				Stadium: The Hawthorns

14 November 1908 12	Tottenham Hotspur	4–0	Birmingham City	Tottenham, London
				Stadium: White Hart Lane

21 November 1908 13	Gainsborough Trinity	0–2	Tottenham Hotspur	Gainsborough, Lincolnshire
				Stadium: The Northolme

28 November 1908 14	Tottenham Hotspur	2–0	Grimsby Town	Tottenham, London
				Stadium: White Hart Lane

5 December 1908 15	Fulham	2–3	Tottenham Hotspur	Fulham, London
				Stadium: Craven Cottage

12 December 1908 16	Tottenham Hotspur	4–2	Burnley	Tottenham, London
				Stadium: White Hart Lane

19 December 1908 17	Bradford Park Avenue	0–2	Tottenham Hotspur	Bradford, Yorkshire
				Stadium: Park Avenue

25 December 1908 18	Oldham Athletic	1–0	Tottenham Hotspur	Oldham, Manchester
				Stadium: Boundary Park

26 December 1908 19	Tottenham Hotspur	3–0	Oldham Athletic	Tottenham, London
				Stadium: White Hart Lane

28 December 1908 20	Wolverhampton Wanderers	1–0	Tottenham Hotspur	Wolverhampton, Midlands
				Stadium: Molineux Stadium

2 January 1909 21	Tottenham Hotspur	3–0	Leeds United	Tottenham, London
				Stadium: White Hart Lane

9 January 1909 22	Barnsley	1–1	Tottenham Hotspur	Barnsley, Yorkshire
				Stadium: Oakwell

23 January 1909 23	Bolton	0–1	Tottenham Hotspur	Bolton, Greater Manchester
				Stadium: Burnden Park

30 January 1909 24	Tottenham Hotspur	0–0	Hull City	Tottenham, London
				Stadium: White Hart Lane

13 February 1909 25	Tottenham Hotspur	4–1	Blackpool	Tottenham, London
				Stadium: White Hart Lane

27 February 1909 26	Tottenham Hotspur	3–3	Glossop North End	Tottenham, London
				Stadium: White Hart Lane

6 March 1909 27	Stockport County	1–3	Tottenham Hotspur	Stockport, Greater Manchester
				Stadium: Edgeley Park

8 March 1909 28	Chesterfield	1–3	Tottenham Hotspur	Chesterfield, Derbyshire
				Stadium: Saltergate

13 March 1909 29	Tottenham Hotspur	1–3	West Bromwich Albion	Tottenham, London
				Stadium: White Hart Lane

20 March 1909 30	Bermingham City	3–3	Tottenham Hotspur	Birmingham, Midlands
	King; Mounteney; Daykin			Stadium: St Andrew's; Attendance: 8,000

27 March 1909 31	Tottenham Hotspur	1–1	Gainsborough Trinity	Tottenham, London
				Stadium: White Hart Lane

3 April 1909 32	Grimsby Town	1–2	Tottenham Hotspur	Cleethorpes, Lincolnshire
				Stadium: Blundell Park

9 April 1909 33	Tottenham Hotspur	0–1	Clapton	Tottenham, London
				Stadium: White Hart Lane

10 April 1909 34	Tottenham Hotspur	1–0	Fulham	Tottenham, London
				Stadium: White Hart Lane

12 April 1909 35	Clapton	0–0	Tottenham Hotspur	Forest Gate, London
				Stadium: The Old Spotted Dog Ground

17 April 1909 36	Burnley	1–2	Tottenham Hotspur	Burnley, Lancashire
				Stadium: Turf Moor

24 April 1909 37	Tottenham Hotspur	3–0	Bradford Park Avenue	Tottenham, London
				Stadium: White Hart Lane

28 April 1909 38	Derby County	1–1	Tottenham Hotspur	Derby, Derbyshire
				Stadium: Baseball Ground

=== FA Cup ===
==== Results ====
16 January 1909 First round	Manchester City	3–4	Tottenham Hotspur	Gorton, Manchester
	Holford		Minter; Robert Steel; Morris	Stadium: Hyde Road; Attendance: 20,000

6 February 1909 Second round	Tottenham Hotspur	1–0	Fulham	Tottenham, London
	Robert Steel			Stadium: White Hart Lane; Attendance: 33,008

20 February 1909 Third round	Tottenham Hotspur	0–0	Burnley	Tottenham, London
				Stadium: White Hart Lane; Attendance: 21,838

24 February 1909 Third round - replay	Burnley	3–1	Tottenham Hotspur	Burnley, Lancashire
			Coquet	Stadium: Turf Moor; Attendance: 30,000

=== London Challenge Cup ===
==== Results ====
5 October 1908	Tottenham Hotspur	1–0	Queens Park Rangers	Tottenham, London
				Stadium: White Hart Lane

30 November 1908	West Ham United	0–2	Tottenham Hotspur	Upton Park, London
				Stadium: Boleyn Ground

22 March 1909	Millwall Athletic	2–0	Tottenham Hotspur	Isle of Dogs, London
				Stadium: North Greenwich

== Works cited ==
- Soar, Phil (1995). Tottenham Hotspur The Official Illustrated History 1882–1995. Hamlyn. ISBN 0-600-58706-1.
- Goodwin, Bob (1992). The Spurs Alphabet. ACL & Polar Publishing (UK) Ltd. ISBN 0-9514862-8-4.
