= List of Tottenham Hotspur F.C. seasons =

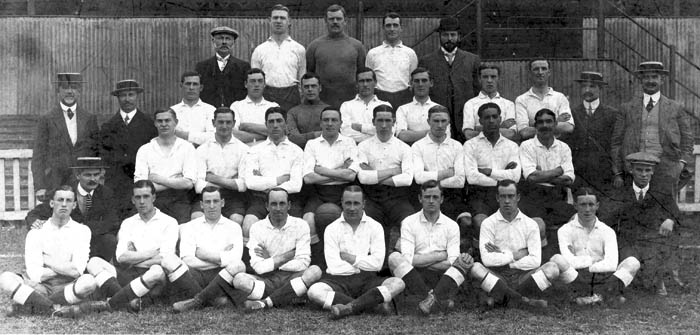
Tottenham Hotspur F.C. squad in 1909

This is a list of seasons played by Tottenham Hotspur Football Club in English football, from the year they first began competitive play, in 1894 in the FA Cup, to the present day. It details the club's record in first class competitions, and the top scorers for each season. Records of exhibitions and minor competitions such as the London Senior Cup are not included.

The club has won the Southern League once, the London League once, the Western League once, the League Championship twice, the FA Cup eight times, the League Cup four times, the Charity Shield four times outright and three times shared, the Southern Charity Cup twice outright and once shared, the London Professional Football Charity Fund match eleven times outright and twice shared, the London FA Charity Cup twice, the European Cup Winners' Cup once, the UEFA Cup/Europa League thrice, and the Anglo-Italian League Cup-Winners' Cup once.

Graph of Tottenham Hotspur league positions

Top scorers in bold were also the top scorers in the top flight of the English league system. From 1993, this player was awarded the Premier League Golden Boot.

== Seasons ==
| Season | League | | | | | | | | | FA Cup | EFL Cup | Europe / Other | | Top goalscorer(s) (Note: Goals in all first class competitions, Southern League (Football League), Premier League, FA Cup, EFL Cup, Europe and FA Charity Shield, including related predecessors such as the Southern Charity Cup, London FA Charity Cup, and London Professional Football Charity Fund are counted.) | |
| Season | Division | Pld | W | D | L | GF | GA | Pts | Pos | FA Cup | EFL Cup | Europe / Other | | Player(s) | Goals |
|---|---|---|---|---|---|---|---|---|---|---|---|---|---|---|---|
| 1894–95 | —N/a | | | | | | | | | Q4 | | | | Donald Goodall | 4 |
| 1895–96 | —N/a | | | | | | | | | R1 | | | | Harry Pryor | 4 |
| 1896–97 | SL (Note: Although the Southern League was not absorbed into the English Football League until 1920, it was a near-equivalent first class league parallel to it, and so is listed here in the first columns.) | 20 | 9 | 4 | 7 | 43 | 29 | 22 | 4th | Q3 | | United League (Note: A short-lived league in the south of England) | 8th | Bob Clements | 22 |
| 1896–97 | SL | 20 | 9 | 4 | 7 | 43 | 29 | 22 | 4th | Q3 | | Wellingborough; Charity Cup | RU | Bob Clements | 22 |
| 1897–98 | SL | 22 | 12 | 4 | 6 | 52 | 31 | 28 | 3rd | R1 | | United League | 2nd | Bill Joyce | 36 |
| 1898–99 | SL | 24 | 10 | 4 | 10 | 40 | 36 | 24 | 7th | R3 | | United League | 3rd | John Cameron | 34 |
| 1898–99 | SL | 24 | 10 | 4 | 10 | 40 | 36 | 24 | 7th | R3 | | Thames & Medway (Note: A short-lived London-area league) | 4th | John Cameron | 34 |
| 1899–1900 | SL | 28 | 20 | 4 | 4 | 67 | 26 | 44 | **W** | R1 | | Southern District; Combination (Note: A parallel league featuring clubs from the Southern League plus Woolwich Arsenal from the English Football League) | 2nd | Tom Pratt | 32 |
| 1900–01 | SL | 28 | 16 | 4 | 8 | 55 | 33 | 36 | 5th | **W** | | Western League | 3 | Sandy Brown | 33 |
| 1901–02 | SL | 30 | 18 | 6 | 6 | 61 | 22 | 42 | 2nd | R1 | | Western League | 2nd | Sandy Brown | 34 |
| 1901–02 | SL | 30 | 18 | 6 | 6 | 61 | 22 | 42 | 2nd | R1 | | London League | 2nd | Sandy Brown | 34 |
| 1901–02 | SL | 30 | 18 | 6 | 6 | 61 | 22 | 42 | 2nd | R1 | | Southern Charity Cup (Note: The name of this competition is given as "Southern Charity Cup" in Goodwin, though that name does not agree with the Wikipedia article on the Sheriff of London Charity Shield (predecessor to today's Charity Shield). However, they are the same competition.) | **W** | Sandy Brown | 34 |
| 1902–03 | SL | 30 | 14 | 7 | 9 | 47 | 31 | 35 | 4th | QF | | Western League | 4th | David Copeland | 13 |
| 1902–03 | SL | 30 | 14 | 7 | 9 | 47 | 31 | 35 | 4th | QF | | London League | **W** | David Copeland | 13 |
| 1902–03 | SL | 30 | 14 | 7 | 9 | 47 | 31 | 35 | 4th | QF | | Southern Charity Cup | R1 | David Copeland | 13 |
| 1903–04 | SL | 34 | 16 | 11 | 7 | 54 | 37 | 43 | 2nd | QF | | Western League | **W** | Jack Jones | 26 |
| 1903–04 | SL | 34 | 16 | 11 | 7 | 54 | 37 | 43 | 2nd | QF | | London League | 2nd | Jack Jones | 26 |
| 1903–04 | SL | 34 | 16 | 11 | 7 | 54 | 37 | 43 | 2nd | QF | | Southern Charity Cup | R1 | Jack Jones | 26 |
| 1904–05 | SL | 34 | 15 | 8 | 11 | 53 | 34 | 38 | 5th | R2 | | Western League | 8th | Vivian Woodward | 14 |
| 1904–05 | SL | 34 | 15 | 8 | 11 | 53 | 34 | 38 | 5th | R2 | | Southern Charity Cup | Shared | Vivian Woodward | 14 |
| 1905–06 | SL | 34 | 16 | 7 | 11 | 46 | 29 | 39 | 5th | R3 | | Western League | 4th | Peter Kyle | 18 |
| 1905–06 | SL | 34 | 16 | 7 | 11 | 46 | 29 | 39 | 5th | R3 | | Southern Charity Cup | SF | Peter Kyle | 18 |
| 1906–07 | SL | 38 | 17 | 9 | 12 | 63 | 45 | 43 | 6th | R3 | | Western League | 4th | James Reid | 21 |
| 1906–07 | SL | 38 | 17 | 9 | 12 | 63 | 45 | 43 | 6th | R3 | | Southern Charity Cup | **W** | James Reid | 21 |
| 1907–08 | SL | 38 | 17 | 7 | 14 | 59 | 48 | 41 | 7th | R1 | | Western League | 3rd | Jimmy Pass | 11 |
| 1907–08 | SL | 38 | 17 | 7 | 14 | 59 | 48 | 41 | 7th | R1 | | Southern Charity Cup | R1 | Jimmy Pass | 11 |
| 1908–09 | Div 2 | 38 | 20 | 11 | 7 | 67 | 32 | 51 | 2nd | R3 | | Charity Cup (Note: The London FA Charity Cup: This multi-round competition is different from the Charity Shield, though it may have fed into it.) | SF | Billy Minter | 20 |
| 1908–09 | Div 2 | 38 | 20 | 11 | 7 | 67 | 32 | 51 | 2nd | R3 | | Charity Fund (Note: Single-game competition; listed in Goodwin but not Wikipedia.) | Shared | Billy Minter | 20 |
| 1909–10 | Div 1 | 38 | 11 | 10 | 17 | 53 | 69 | 32 | 15th | R3 | | Charity Cup | RU | Billy Minter | 23 |
| 1909–10 | Div 1 | 38 | 11 | 10 | 17 | 53 | 69 | 32 | 15th | R3 | | Charity Fund | **W** | Billy Minter | 23 |
| 1910–11 | Div 1 | 38 | 13 | 6 | 19 | 52 | 63 | 32 | 15th | R2 | | Charity Cup | **W** | Billy Minter | 25 |
| 1910–11 | Div 1 | 38 | 13 | 6 | 19 | 52 | 63 | 32 | 15th | R2 | | Charity Fund | **W** | Billy Minter | 25 |
| 1911–12 | Div 1 | 38 | 14 | 9 | 15 | 53 | 53 | 37 | 12th | R1 | | Charity Cup | R1 | Billy Minter | 18 |
| 1911–12 | Div 1 | 38 | 14 | 9 | 15 | 53 | 53 | 37 | 12th | R1 | | Charity Fund | **W** | Billy Minter | 18 |
| 1912–13 | Div 1 | 38 | 12 | 6 | 20 | 45 | 72 | 30 | 17th | R2 | | Charity Cup | R2 | Billy Minter | 17 |
| 1912–13 | Div 1 | 38 | 12 | 6 | 20 | 45 | 72 | 30 | 17th | R2 | | Charity Fund | L | Billy Minter | 17 |
| 1913–14 | Div 1 | 38 | 12 | 10 | 16 | 50 | 62 | 34 | 17th | R2 | | Charity Cup | RU | Jimmy Cantrell | 21 |
| 1913–14 | Div 1 | 38 | 12 | 10 | 16 | 50 | 62 | 34 | 17th | R2 | | Charity Fund | L | Jimmy Cantrell | 21 |
| 1914–15 | Div 1 | 38 | 8 | 12 | 18 | 57 | 90 | 28 | 20th | R2 | | Charity Cup | R2 | Bert Bliss | 23 |
| 1914–15 | Div 1 | 38 | 8 | 12 | 18 | 57 | 90 | 28 | 20th | R2 | | Charity Fund | Shared | Bert Bliss | 23 |
No competitive football was played between 1915 and 1919 due to World War I
| 1919–20 | Div 2 | 42 | 32 | 6 | 4 | 102 | 32 | 70 | **1st** | R4 | | Charity Cup | R2 | Bert Bliss | 33 |
| 1919–20 | Div 2 | 42 | 32 | 6 | 4 | 102 | 32 | 70 | **1st** | R4 | | Charity Fund | **W** | Bert Bliss | 33 |
| 1919–20 | Div 2 | 42 | 32 | 6 | 4 | 102 | 32 | 70 | **1st** | R4 | | Charity Shield (Note: Note that in the early years of the Charity Shield the match was played in May, at the end of the season, rather than at the beginning as it was later. The 1920 Charity Shield is thus part of the 1919–1920 season.) | RU | Bert Bliss | 33 |
| 1920–21 | Div 1 | 42 | 19 | 9 | 14 | 70 | 48 | 47 | 6th | **W** | | Charity Cup | SF | Bert Bliss | 23 |
| 1920–21 | Div 1 | 42 | 19 | 9 | 14 | 70 | 48 | 47 | 6th | **W** | | Charity Fund | **W** | Bert Bliss | 23 |
| 1920–21 | Div 1 | 42 | 19 | 9 | 14 | 70 | 48 | 47 | 6th | **W** | | Charity Shield | **W** | Bert Bliss | 23 |
| 1921–22 | Div 1 | 42 | 21 | 9 | 12 | 65 | 39 | 51 | 2nd | SF | | Charity Cup | SF | Jimmy Seed Charlie Wilson | 14 |
| 1921–22 | Div 1 | 42 | 21 | 9 | 12 | 65 | 39 | 51 | 2nd | SF | | Charity Fund | RU | Jimmy Seed Charlie Wilson | 14 |
| 1922–23 | Div 1 | 42 | 17 | 7 | 18 | 50 | 50 | 41 | 12th | R4 | | Charity Cup | R1 | Alex Lindsay | 17 |
| 1922–23 | Div 1 | 42 | 17 | 7 | 18 | 50 | 50 | 41 | 12th | R4 | | Charity Fund | **W** | Alex Lindsay | 17 |
| 1923–24 | Div 1 | 42 | 12 | 14 | 16 | 50 | 56 | 38 | 15th | R1 | | Charity Cup | R2 | Alex Lindsay | 20 |
| 1923–24 | Div 1 | 42 | 12 | 14 | 16 | 50 | 56 | 38 | 15th | R1 | | Charity Fund | RU | Alex Lindsay | 20 |
| 1924–25 | Div 1 | 42 | 15 | 12 | 15 | 52 | 43 | 42 | 12th | R3 | | Charity Cup | SF | Jimmy Seed | 20 |
| 1924–25 | Div 1 | 42 | 15 | 12 | 15 | 52 | 43 | 42 | 12th | R3 | | Charity Fund | RU | Jimmy Seed | 20 |
| 1925–26 | Div 1 | 42 | 15 | 9 | 18 | 66 | 79 | 39 | 15th | R2 | | Charity Cup | R1 | Frank Osborne | 27 |
| 1925–26 | Div 1 | 42 | 15 | 9 | 18 | 66 | 79 | 39 | 15th | R2 | | Charity Fund | **W** | Frank Osborne | 27 |
| 1926–27 | Div 1 | 42 | 16 | 9 | 17 | 76 | 78 | 41 | 13th | R3 | | Charity Cup | R1 | Jimmy Dimmock | 21 |
| 1926–27 | Div 1 | 42 | 16 | 9 | 17 | 76 | 78 | 41 | 13th | R3 | | Charity Fund | **W** | Jimmy Dimmock | 21 |
| 1927–28 | Div 1 | 42 | 15 | 8 | 19 | 74 | 86 | 38 | 21st | R6 | | Charity Cup | R1 | Taffy O'Callaghan | 28 |
| 1927–28 | Div 1 | 42 | 15 | 8 | 19 | 74 | 86 | 38 | 21st | R6 | | Charity Fund | **W** | Taffy O'Callaghan | 28 |
| 1928–29 | Div 2 | 42 | 17 | 9 | 16 | 75 | 81 | 43 | 10th | R3 | | Charity Cup | **W** | Frank Osborne | 16 |
| 1928–29 | Div 2 | 42 | 17 | 9 | 16 | 75 | 81 | 43 | 10th | R3 | | Charity Fund | **W** | Frank Osborne | 16 |
| 1929–30 | Div 2 | 42 | 15 | 9 | 18 | 59 | 61 | 39 | 12th (Note: Lowest League finish.) | R3 | | Charity Cup | R1 | Ted Harper | 14 |
| 1929–30 | Div 2 | 42 | 15 | 9 | 18 | 59 | 61 | 39 | 12th | R3 | | Charity Fund | **W** | Ted Harper | 14 |
| 1930–31 | Div 2 | 42 | 22 | 7 | 13 | 88 | 55 | 51 | 3rd | R4 | | Charity Cup | RU | Ted Harper | 36 |
| 1930–31 | Div 2 | 42 | 22 | 7 | 13 | 88 | 55 | 51 | 3rd | R4 | | Charity Fund | Shared | Ted Harper | 36 |
| 1931–32 | Div 2 | 42 | 16 | 11 | 15 | 87 | 78 | 43 | 8th | R3 | | | | George Hunt | 26 |
| 1932–33 | Div 2 | 42 | 20 | 15 | 7 | 96 | 51 | 55 | 2nd | R4 | | | | George Hunt | 36 |
| 1933–34 | Div 1 | 42 | 21 | 7 | 14 | 79 | 56 | 49 | 3rd | R5 | | | | George Hunt | 35 |
| 1934–35 | Div 1 | 42 | 10 | 10 | 22 | 54 | 93 | 30 | 22nd | R5 | | | | Willie Evans | 14 |
| 1935–36 | Div 2 | 42 | 18 | 13 | 11 | 91 | 55 | 49 | 5th | QF | | | | Johnny Morrison | 28 |
| 1936–37 | Div 2 | 42 | 17 | 9 | 16 | 88 | 66 | 43 | 10th | QF | | | | Johnny Morrison | 35 |
| 1937–38 | Div 2 | 42 | 19 | 6 | 17 | 76 | 54 | 44 | 5th | QF | | | | Johnny Morrison | 25 |
| 1938–39 | Div 2 | 42 | 19 | 9 | 14 | 67 | 62 | 47 | 8th | R4 | | | | Albert Hall Johnny Morrison | 11 |
No competitive football was played between 1939 and 1945 due to World War II
| 1945–46 | There was no League football in 1945–46 | | | | | | | | | R3 | | | | | |
| 1946–47 | Div 2 | 42 | 17 | 14 | 11 | 65 | 53 | 48 | 6th | R3 | | | | George Foreman | 14 |
| 1947–48 | Div 2 | 42 | 15 | 14 | 13 | 56 | 43 | 44 | 8th | SF | | | | Len Duquemin | 24 |
| 1948–49 | Div 2 | 42 | 17 | 16 | 9 | 72 | 44 | 50 | 5th | R3 | | | | Les Bennett | 19 |
| 1949–50 | Div 2 | 42 | 27 | 7 | 8 | 81 | 35 | 61 | **1st** | R5 | | | | Les Medley | 19 |
| 1950–51 | Div 1 | 42 | 25 | 10 | 7 | 82 | 44 | 60 | **1st** | R3 | | | | Sonny Walters | 15 |
| 1951–52 | Div 1 | 42 | 22 | 9 | 11 | 76 | 51 | 53 | 2nd | R4 | | Charity Shield | **W** | Les Bennett | 21 |
| 1952–53 | Div 1 | 42 | 15 | 11 | 16 | 78 | 69 | 41 | 10th | SF | | | | Len Duquemin | 24 |
| 1953–54 | Div 1 | 42 | 16 | 5 | 21 | 65 | 76 | 37 | 16th | QF | | | | George Robb Sonny Walters | 16 |
| 1954–55 | Div 1 | 42 | 16 | 8 | 18 | 72 | 73 | 40 | 16th | R5 | | | | Johnny Gavin | 14 |
| 1955–56 | Div 1 | 42 | 15 | 7 | 20 | 61 | 71 | 37 | 18th | SF | | | | Bobby Smith | 13 |
| 1956–57 | Div 1 | 42 | 22 | 12 | 8 | 104 | 56 | 56 | 2nd | R5 | | | | Bobby Smith Alfie Stokes | 19 |
| 1957–58 | Div 1 | 42 | 21 | 9 | 12 | 93 | 77 | 51 | 3rd | R4 | | | | **Bobby Smith** | 38 |
| 1958–59 | Div 1 | 42 | 13 | 10 | 19 | 85 | 95 | 36 | 18th | R5 | | | | Bobby Smith | 35 |
| 1959–60 | Div 1 | 42 | 21 | 11 | 10 | 86 | 50 | 53 | 3rd | R5 | | | | Bobby Smith | 30 |
| 1960–61 (Note: First team to win The Double in the 20th century) | Div 1 | 42 | 31 | 4 | 7 | 115 | 55 | 66 | **1st** | **W** | | | | Bobby Smith | 33 |
| 1961–62 | Div 1 | 42 | 21 | 10 | 11 | 88 | 69 | 52 | 3rd | **W** | | Charity Shield | **W** | Jimmy Greaves | 30 |
| 1961–62 | Div 1 | 42 | 21 | 10 | 11 | 88 | 69 | 52 | 3rd | **W** | | European Cup | SF | Jimmy Greaves | 30 |
| 1962–63 (Note: First British team to win a European trophy by winning the Cup Winners' Cup) | Div 1 | 42 | 23 | 9 | 10 | 111 | 62 | 55 | 2nd | R3 | | Charity Shield | **W** | **Jimmy Greaves** | 44 |
| 1962–63 | Div 1 | 42 | 23 | 9 | 10 | 111 | 62 | 55 | 2nd | R3 | | Cup Winners' Cup | **W** | **Jimmy Greaves** | 44 |
| 1963–64 | Div 1 | 42 | 22 | 7 | 13 | 97 | 81 | 51 | 4th | R3 | | Cup Winners' Cup | R2 | **Jimmy Greaves** | 36 |
| 1964–65 | Div 1 | 42 | 19 | 7 | 16 | 87 | 71 | 45 | 6th | R5 | | | | **Jimmy Greaves** | 35 |
| 1965–66 | Div 1 | 42 | 16 | 12 | 14 | 75 | 66 | 44 | 8th | R5 | | | | Jimmy Greaves | 16 |
| 1966–67 | Div 1 | 42 | 24 | 8 | 10 | 71 | 48 | 56 | 3rd | **W** | R2 | | | Jimmy Greaves | 31 |
| 1967–68 | Div 1 | 42 | 19 | 9 | 14 | 70 | 59 | 47 | 7th | R5 | | Charity Shield | Shared | Jimmy Greaves | 29 |
| 1967–68 | Div 1 | 42 | 19 | 9 | 14 | 70 | 59 | 47 | 7th | R5 | | Cup Winners' Cup | R2 | Jimmy Greaves | 29 |
| 1968–69 | Div 1 | 42 | 14 | 17 | 11 | 61 | 51 | 45 | 6th | QF | SF | | | **Jimmy Greaves** | 36 |
| 1969–70 | Div 1 | 42 | 17 | 9 | 16 | 54 | 55 | 43 | 11th | R4 | R2 | | | Martin Chivers Jimmy Greaves | 11 |
| 1970–71 | Div 1 | 42 | 19 | 14 | 9 | 54 | 33 | 52 | 3rd | QF | **W** | Texaco Cup | R2 | Martin Chivers | 34 |
| 1971–72 | Div 1 | 42 | 19 | 13 | 10 | 63 | 42 | 51 | 6th | QF | SF | UEFA Cup | **W** | Martin Chivers | 44 |
| 1971–72 | Div 1 | 42 | 19 | 13 | 10 | 63 | 42 | 51 | 6th | QF | SF | Anglo-Italian League Cup Winners' Cup | **W** | Martin Chivers | 44 |
| 1972–73 | Div 1 | 42 | 16 | 13 | 13 | 58 | 48 | 45 | 8th | R4 | **W** | UEFA Cup | SF | Martin Chivers | 33 |
| 1973–74 | Div 1 | 42 | 14 | 14 | 14 | 45 | 50 | 42 | 11th | R3 | R2 | UEFA Cup | RU | Martin Chivers | 23 |
| 1974–75 | Div 1 | 42 | 13 | 8 | 21 | 52 | 63 | 34 | 19th | R3 | R2 | | | John Duncan | 12 |
| 1975–76 | Div 1 | 42 | 14 | 15 | 13 | 63 | 63 | 43 | 9th | R3 | SF | | | John Duncan | 25 |
| 1976–77 | Div 1 | 42 | 12 | 9 | 21 | 48 | 72 | 33 | 22nd | R3 | R3 | | | Chris Jones | 9 |
| 1977–78 | Div 2 | 42 | 20 | 16 | 6 | 83 | 49 | 56 | 3rd | R3 | R3 | | | John Duncan | 20 |
| 1978–79 | Div 1 | 42 | 13 | 15 | 14 | 48 | 61 | 41 | 11th | QF | R2 | | | Peter Taylor | 12 |
| 1979–80 | Div 1 | 42 | 15 | 10 | 17 | 52 | 62 | 40 | 14th | QF | R2 | | | Glenn Hoddle | 22 |
| 1980–81 | Div 1 | 42 | 14 | 15 | 13 | 70 | 68 | 43 | 10th | **W** | QF | | | **Steve Archibald** | 25 |
| 1981–82 | Div 1 | 42 | 20 | 11 | 11 | 67 | 48 | 71 (Note: The 1981–82 season saw the introduction of three points for a win.) | 4th | **W** | RU | Charity Shield | Shared | Garth Crooks | 18 |
| 1981–82 | Div 1 | 42 | 20 | 11 | 11 | 67 | 48 | 71 | 4th | **W** | RU | Cup Winners' Cup | SF | Garth Crooks | 18 |
| 1982–83 | Div 1 | 42 | 20 | 9 | 13 | 65 | 50 | 69 | 4th | R5 | QF | Charity Shield | RU | Steve Archibald Garth Crooks | 15 |
| 1982–83 | Div 1 | 42 | 20 | 9 | 13 | 65 | 50 | 69 | 4th | R5 | QF | Cup Winners' Cup | R2 | Steve Archibald Garth Crooks | 15 |
| 1983–84 | Div 1 | 42 | 17 | 10 | 15 | 64 | 65 | 61 | 8th | R4 | R3 | UEFA Cup | **W** | Steve Archibald | 28 |
| 1984–85 | Div 1 | 42 | 23 | 8 | 11 | 78 | 51 | 77 | 3rd | R4 | R4 | UEFA Cup | QF | Mark Falco | 29 |
| 1985–86 | Div 1 | 42 | 19 | 8 | 15 | 74 | 52 | 65 | 10th | R5 | R4 | UEFA Cup | (Note: From 1985 to 1991 English clubs were banned from European competitions after the Heysel Stadium Disaster during the 1985 European Cup Final.) | Mark Falco | 25 |
| 1985–86 | Div 1 | 42 | 19 | 8 | 15 | 74 | 52 | 65 | 10th | R5 | R4 | Football League Super Cup | SF | Mark Falco | 25 |
| 1986–87 | Div 1 | 42 | 21 | 8 | 13 | 68 | 43 | 71 | 3rd | RU | SF | | | **Clive Allen** | 49 |
| 1987–88 | Div 1 | 40 | 12 | 11 | 17 | 38 | 48 | 47 | 13th | R4 | R3 | UEFA Cup | | Clive Allen | 13 |
| 1988–89 | Div 1 | 38 | 15 | 12 | 11 | 60 | 46 | 57 | 6th | R3 | R4 | | | Chris Waddle | 14 |
| 1989–90 | Div 1 | 38 | 19 | 6 | 13 | 59 | 47 | 63 | 3rd | R3 | QF | | | **Gary Lineker** | 26 |
| 1990–91 | Div 1 | 38 | 11 | 16 | 11 | 51 | 50 | 49 | 10th | **W** | QF | UEFA Cup | | Paul Gascoigne Gary Lineker | 19 |
| 1991–92 | Div 1 | 43 | 15 | 7 | 20 | 58 | 63 | 52 | 15th | R3 | SF | Charity Shield | Shared | Gary Lineker | 35 |
| 1991–92 | Div 1 | 43 | 15 | 7 | 20 | 58 | 63 | 52 | 15th | R3 | SF | Cup Winners' Cup | QF | Gary Lineker | 35 |
| 1992–93 | Prem | 42 | 16 | 11 | 15 | 60 | 66 | 59 | 8th | SF | R3 | | | **Teddy Sheringham** | 28 |
| 1993–94 | Prem | 42 | 11 | 12 | 19 | 54 | 59 | 45 | 15th | R4 | QF | | | Teddy Sheringham | 15 |
| 1994–95 | Prem | 42 | 16 | 14 | 12 | 66 | 58 | 62 | 7th | SF | R3 | | | Jürgen Klinsmann | 29 |
| 1995–96 | Prem | 38 | 16 | 13 | 9 | 50 | 38 | 61 | 8th | R5 | R3 | Intertoto Cup | GS (Note: Missing three goalscorers from this tournament in June/July 1995) | Teddy Sheringham | 24 |
| 1996–97 | Prem | 38 | 13 | 7 | 18 | 44 | 51 | 46 | 10th | R3 | R4 | | | Teddy Sheringham | 8 |
| 1997–98 | Prem | 38 | 11 | 11 | 16 | 44 | 56 | 44 | 14th | R4 | R3 | | | David Ginola Jürgen Klinsmann | 9 |
| 1998–99 | Prem | 38 | 11 | 14 | 13 | 47 | 50 | 47 | 11th | SF | **W** | | | Steffen Iversen | 13 |
| 1999–2000 | Prem | 38 | 15 | 8 | 15 | 57 | 49 | 53 | 10th | R3 | R4 | UEFA Cup | R2 | Steffen Iversen | 17 |
| 2000–01 | Prem | 38 | 13 | 10 | 15 | 47 | 54 | 49 | 12th | SF | R3 | | | Serhii Rebrov | 12 |
| 2001–02 | Prem | 38 | 14 | 8 | 16 | 49 | 53 | 50 | 9th | QF | RU | | | Les Ferdinand | 15 |
| 2002–03 | Prem | 38 | 14 | 8 | 16 | 51 | 62 | 50 | 10th | R3 | R3 | | | Robbie Keane Teddy Sheringham | 13 |
| 2003–04 | Prem | 38 | 13 | 6 | 19 | 47 | 57 | 45 | 14th | R4 | QF | | | Robbie Keane | 16 |
| 2004–05 | Prem | 38 | 14 | 10 | 14 | 47 | 41 | 52 | 9th | QF | QF | | | Jermain Defoe | 22 |
| 2005–06 | Prem | 38 | 18 | 11 | 9 | 53 | 38 | 65 | 5th | R3 | R2 | | | Robbie Keane | 16 |
| 2006–07 | Prem | 38 | 17 | 9 | 12 | 57 | 54 | 60 | 5th | QF | SF | UEFA Cup | QF | Dimitar Berbatov | 23 |
| 2007–08 | Prem | 38 | 11 | 13 | 14 | 66 | 61 | 46 | 11th | R4 | **W** | UEFA Cup | R16 | Dimitar Berbatov Robbie Keane | 23 |
| 2008–09 | Prem | 38 | 14 | 9 | 15 | 45 | 45 | 51 | 8th | R4 | RU | UEFA Cup | R32 | Darren Bent | 17 |
| 2009–10 | Prem | 38 | 21 | 7 | 10 | 67 | 41 | 70 | 4th | SF | QF | | | Jermain Defoe | 24 |
| 2010–11 | Prem | 38 | 16 | 14 | 8 | 55 | 46 | 62 | 5th | R4 | R3 | Champions League | QF | Rafael van der Vaart | 15 |
| 2011–12 | Prem | 38 | 20 | 9 | 9 | 66 | 41 | 69 | 4th | SF | R3 | Europa League | GS | Emmanuel Adebayor | 18 |
| 2012–13 | Prem | 38 | 21 | 9 | 8 | 66 | 46 | 72 | 5th | R4 | R4 | Europa League | QF | Gareth Bale | 26 |
| 2013–14 | Prem | 38 | 21 | 6 | 11 | 55 | 51 | 69 | 6th | R3 | QF | Europa League | R16 | Emmanuel Adebayor | 14 |
| 2014–15 | Prem | 38 | 19 | 7 | 12 | 58 | 53 | 64 | 5th | R4 | RU | Europa League | R32 | Harry Kane | 31 |
| 2015–16 | Prem | 38 | 19 | 13 | 6 | 69 | 35 | 70 | 3rd | R5 | R3 | Europa League | R16 | **Harry Kane** | 28 |
| 2016–17 | Prem | 38 | 26 | 8 | 4 | 86 | 26 | 86 | 2nd | SF | R4 | Champions League | GS | **Harry Kane** | 35 |
| 2016–17 | Prem | 38 | 26 | 8 | 4 | 86 | 26 | 86 | 2nd | SF | R4 | Europa League | R32 | **Harry Kane** | 35 |
| 2017–18 | Prem | 38 | 23 | 8 | 7 | 74 | 36 | 77 | 3rd | SF | R4 | Champions League | R16 | Harry Kane | 41 |
| 2018–19 | Prem | 38 | 23 | 2 | 13 | 67 | 39 | 71 | 4th | R4 | SF | Champions League | RU | Harry Kane | 24 |
| 2019–20 | Prem | 38 | 16 | 11 | 11 | 61 | 47 | 59 | 6th | R5 | R3 | Champions League | R16 | Harry Kane | 24 |
| 2020–21 | Prem | 38 | 18 | 8 | 12 | 68 | 45 | 62 | 7th | R5 | RU | Europa League | R16 | **Harry Kane** | 33 |
| 2021–22 | Prem | 38 | 22 | 5 | 11 | 69 | 40 | 71 | 4th | R5 | SF | Europa Conference League | GS | Harry Kane (Note: Son Heung-min was joint top Premier League goalscorer with 23 goals) | 27 |
| 2022–23 | Prem | 38 | 18 | 6 | 14 | 70 | 63 | 60 | 8th | R5 | R3 | Champions League | R16 | Harry Kane | 32 |
| 2023–24 | Prem | 38 | 20 | 6 | 12 | 74 | 61 | 66 | 5th | R4 | R2 | | | Son Heung-min | 17 |
| 2024–25 | Prem | 38 | 11 | 5 | 22 | 64 | 65 | 38 | 17th | R4 | SF | Europa League | **W** | Brennan Johnson | 18 |
| 2025–26 | Prem | 38 | 10 | 11 | 17 | 48 | 57 | 41 | 17th | R3 | R4 | Super Cup | RU | Richarlison | 12 |
| 2025–26 | Prem | 38 | 10 | 11 | 17 | 48 | 57 | 41 | 17th | R3 | R4 | Champions League | R16 | Richarlison | 12 |

=== Key ===
| Key | Meaning | Key | Bras |
|---|---|---|---|
| Pld | Matches played | GS | Group Stage |
| W | Matches won | IR | Intermediate Round |
| D | Matches drawn | R1 | Round 1 |
| L | Matches lost | R2 | Round 2 |
| GF | Goals for | R3 | Round 3 |
| GA | Goals against | R4 | Round 4 |
| Pts | Points | R5 | Round 5 |
| Pos | Final position | R32 | Round of 32 |
| Prem | Premier League | R16 | Round of 16 |
| Div 1 | Football League First Division | QF | Quarter-finals |
| Div 2 | Football League Second Division | SF | Semi-finals |
| SL | Southern League | RU | Runners-up |
| | | W | Winners |

| Winners | Runners-up | Promoted | Relegated |
