= Boreham (disambiguation) =

Boreham is a village and civil parish in Essex, England.

Boreham may also refer to:

== Places in England ==
- Boreham, Wiltshire, an area of Warminster
- Boreham Circuit, a disused motor racing circuit in Essex
- Boreham Street, West Sussex, a village

== People with the surname ==
- Chloe Boreham (born 1986), Franco-Australian actress
- Colin Boreham (born 1954), British athlete
- Craig Boreham, Australian film director, producer, and writer.
- Frank W. Boreham (1871–1959), English Baptist minister, worked in New Zealand and Australia
- Fred Boreham (1885–1951), English footballer
- Frederick Boreham (1888–1966), Archdeacon of Cornwall and Chaplain to Queen Elizabeth II
- Jamie Boreham (born 1978), Canadian football player and coach
- John Boreham (1925–1994), British government statistician
- Leslie Boreham (1918–2004), English barrister and judge
- Puakena Boreham (born 1970), Tuvaluan politician
- Stephen Boreham (1857–1925), New Zealand shearer and trade unionist

== See also ==
- Borehamwood, Hertfordshire, England
