= Bill Whatley =

Bill Whatley may refer to:

- Bill Whatley (footballer)
- Bill Whatley (trade unionist)
