= 1921 FA Charity Shield =

- Event: FA Charity Shield
Tottenham Hotspur	Burnley
2	0
- Date: 16 May 1921
- Venue: White Hart Lane, London
- Attendance: 18,000
- Weather: Hot, strong sunshine

The 1921 FA Charity Shield was a football match played on 16 May 1921. It was the eighth FA Charity Shield match and was contested by First Division champions Burnley and FA Cup winners Tottenham Hotspur. Tottenham won 2–0, their first of seven Charity Shield wins, having lost to West Bromwich Albion by the same score the previous year. Burnley's appearance was their first in the Charity Shield, thought they have since won the competition twice.

This was the first Charity Shield match played between the League champions and FA Cup winners, following the Southern Football League being absorbed into the English football league system. The format of League champions versus Cup winners would, from 1930 onwards, become the standard format of the competition. As with the 1920 match, the match was played at Tottenham's home ground, White Hart Lane. A much lower attendance on the previous season was achieved, however, with poor bank holiday rail services and hot weather blamed.

Tottenham had won the Second Division in 1920, which had qualified them for the previous season's Charity Shield. In their first season in the First Division they finished in a strong 6th place and won their second FA Cup. Burnley's 1921 championship win was their first of two to date, having been the runner-up in the previous season.

In the match, Tottenham's technical game was more suited to the weather. Their accurate passing and build-up play was a better option in the heat to the physical and energetic style that Burnley had relied on to take them to the top of the table. Tottenham scored both goals in the first half, with goals for Bert Bliss and Jimmy Cantrell.

== Match details ==
16 May 1921

Tottenham Hotspur	2–0	Burnley
Cantrell; Bliss

White Hart Lane, London
Attendance: 18,000

Tottenham Hotspur
Burnley
