= Erik Lamela =

Argentine footballer (born 1992)

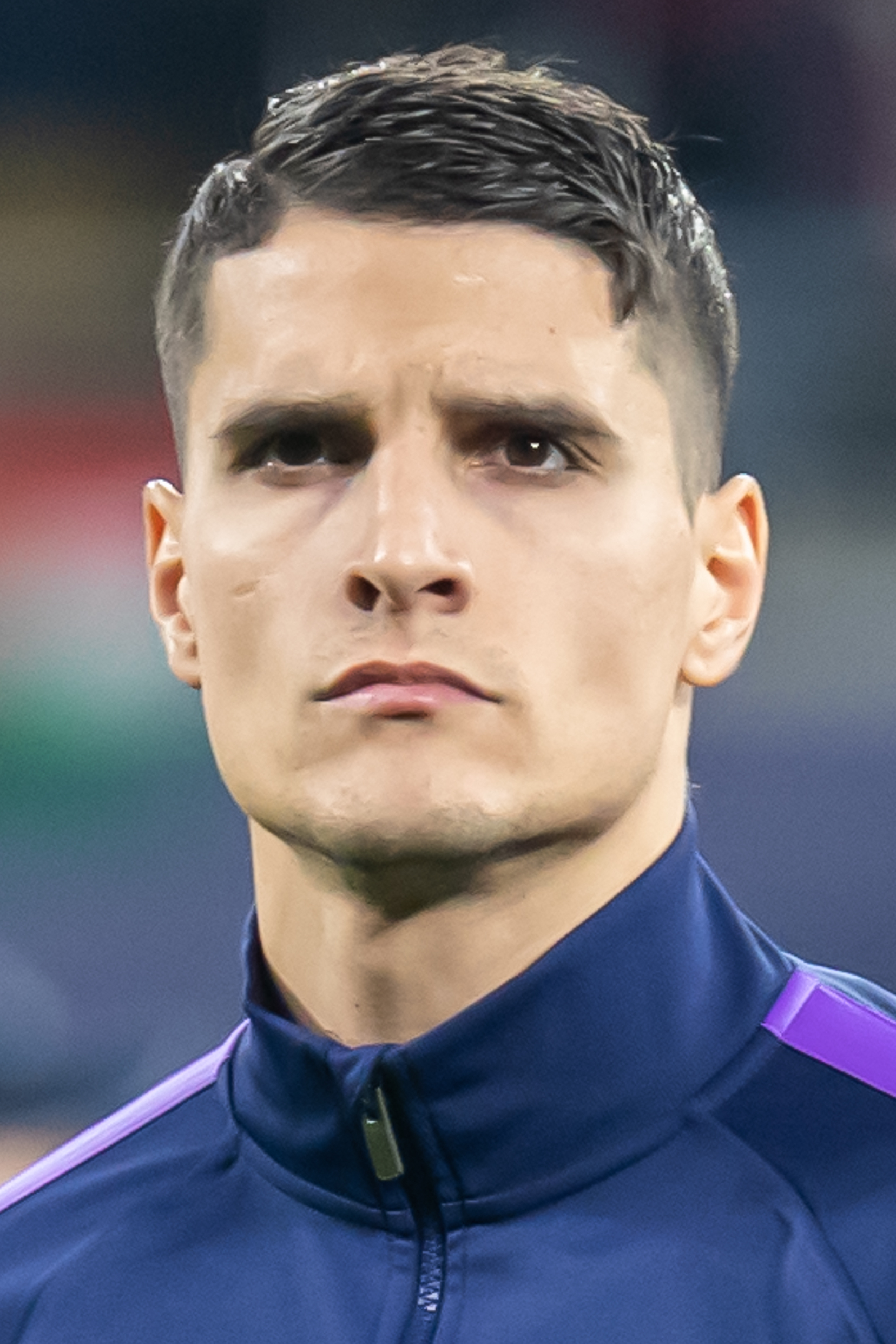
- Lamela lining up for Tottenham Hotspur in 2020

Personal information
- Full name: Erik Manuel Lamela
- Date of birth: 4 March 1992 (age 34)
- Place of birth: Buenos Aires, Argentina
- Height: 1.81 m (5 ft 11 in)
- Positions: Right winger; attacking midfielder

Team information
- Current team: Monterrey (assistant coach)

Youth career
- 2000–2010: River Plate

Senior career*
Years	Team	Apps	(Gls)
2009–2011	River Plate	36	(4)
2011–2013	Roma	62	(19)
2013–2021	Tottenham Hotspur	177	(17)
2021–2024	Sevilla	65	(13)
2024–2025	AEK Athens	24	(5)
Total		364	(58)

International career
2011–2012	Argentina U20	4	(3)
2011–2018	Argentina	25	(3)
Medal record
Men's football
Representing Argentina
Copa América
Runner-up	2015 Chile
Runner-up	2016 United States
- * Club domestic league appearances and goals

Erik Manuel Lamela (born 4 March 1992) is an Argentine former professional footballer who played as an attacking midfielder or right winger. He is currently serving as assistant coach to Matías Almeyda in the Liga MX club Monterrey.

Lamela began his career at River Plate, and in 2011 transferred to Roma for an initial €12 million. After two Serie A seasons, he joined Premier League club Tottenham Hotspur for a fee of £25.8 million, where he made over 250 appearances across eight seasons and reached the 2019 UEFA Champions League final. After stints at Sevilla, where he won the UEFA Europa League in 2023, and AEK Athens, Lamela retired from professional football in 2025.

A full Argentina international from 2011 to 2018, Lamela was part of the squads which finished as runners-up at the 2015 and 2016 editions of the Copa América.

== Early life ==
Lamela was born on 4 March 1992 to Miriam and José Lamela in a northern suburb of Buenos Aires, Argentina. His family gave him the nickname "Coco". After he had joined River Plate as a seven-year-old, Barcelona reportedly offered Lamela and his family $160,000 USD a year as well as a house and employment for his parents to move to Barcelona in a similar deal to the one that saw Lionel Messi move to Spain as a youngster. In 2004, a Trans World Sport film crew travelled to Argentina to interview a 12-year-old Lamela who was already making headlines after scoring 120 goals for River Plate's youth side the previous season. In the video, Lamela declared his wish to follow in the footsteps of Diego Maradona and win a World Cup for Argentina.

== Club career ==
=== River Plate ===
Lamela made his first-team debut for River Plate on 14 June 2009 in a game against Tigre for the 2009 Clausura tournament. He entered the field on the 80th minute, substituting Robert Flores. Lamela scored his first goal for River on 5 December 2010 in a match against Colón for the Apertura tournament. He scored his second goal against Lanús in the final fixture of that Apertura, helping River win the match 4–2.

The midfielder was a regular starter for River during the 2010–11 Argentine Primera División season, playing 34 games and scoring four goals. He helped his team to finish in an overall sixth place that would have qualified them for the 2011 Copa Sudamericana. Due to the relegation format of the Argentine Primera that accounts for a team's last three seasons, however, River was relegated after losing a playoff with Belgrano.

=== Roma ===
==== 2011–12 season ====
On 6 August 2011, Lamela joined Italian club Roma of Serie A for a fee of €12 million, plus €2 million in bonuses, which was activated after his 20th club appearance. Roma also paid an additional €3.2 million to Orel B.V. — plus 10% added value if the player was later sold above €12 million — and €3.06 million in the form of taxes to the Government of Argentina. Lamela signed a 5-year contract worth €1.8 million in gross in the first season, but would gradually increase by €350,000 on 1 July 2012 (to €2.15M), 2014 (€2.5M) and 2015 (€2.85M). On 23 October 2011, he scored his first goal in Serie A against Palermo. Later, he scored goals against Lecce, Novara, and Cesena. Lamela ended his first season at the Stadio Olimpico with six goals in 31 games in all competitions.

==== 2012–13 season ====
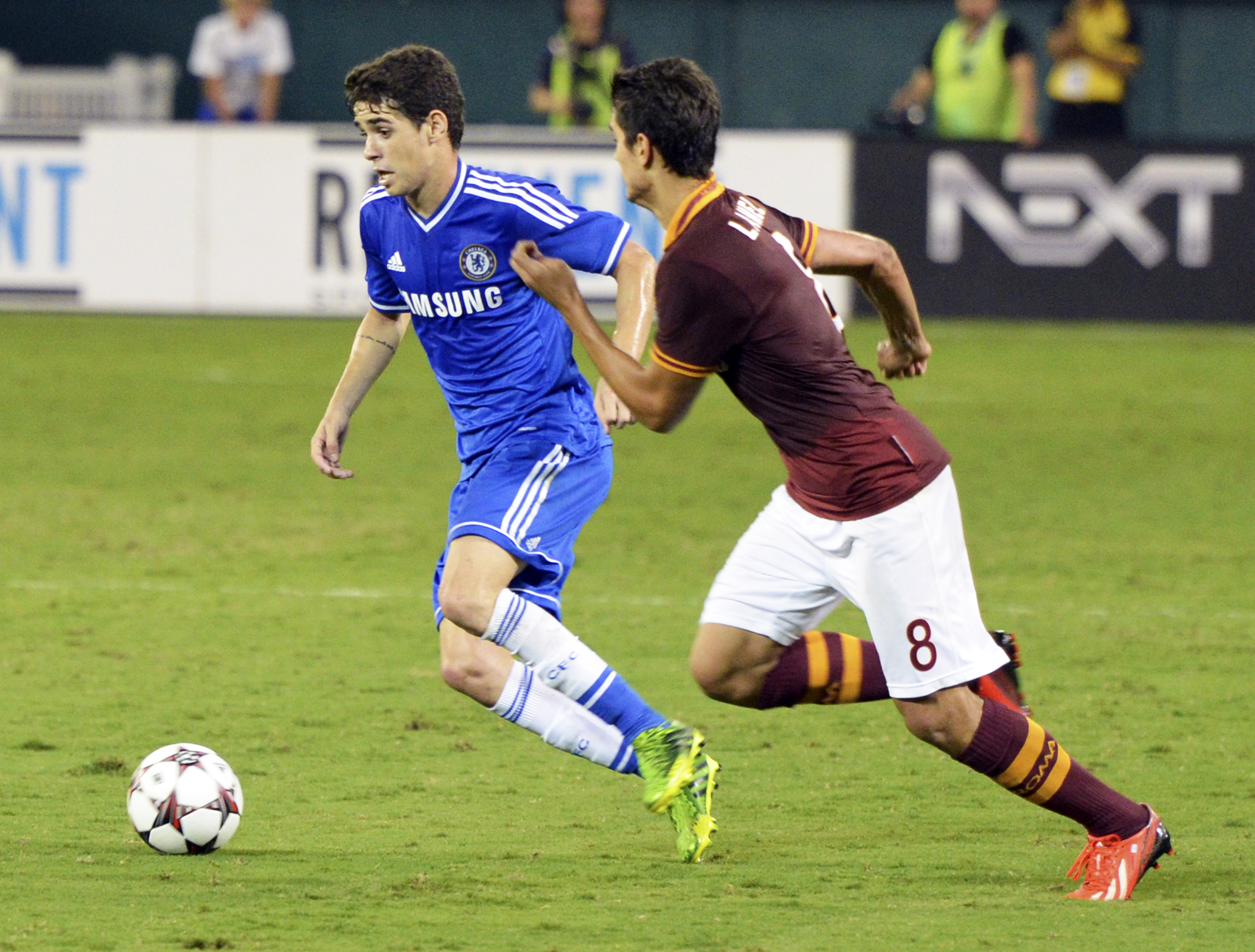
Lamela (right) playing for Roma in 2013

Lamela began the 2012–13 season well, his first goal of the season coming against Bologna on 16 September 2012. Lamela hit a superb patch of form in October and early November, scoring seven goals in six games, including a brace against Udinese in a 3–2 home defeat and goals against Atalanta, Genoa, Parma, and Palermo. He also scored a goal in the Derby della Capitale against Lazio. After almost a month out with an ankle ligament injury, he returned to the field and scored a brace against Milan in a 4–2 victory on 22 December.

Lamela went on to score 15 times in 33 games, putting him joint-fifth in Serie A and second to striker Pablo Osvaldo (16 goals) at Roma. Lamela's and Roma's season, however, ended in heartache with defeat to Rome rivals Lazio in the Coppa Italia final, coupled with finishing sixth in Serie A, meaning that Roma would not play European football for the second consecutive season.

=== Tottenham Hotspur ===
On 30 August 2013, Premier League club Tottenham Hotspur completed the transfer of Lamela from Roma for a deal worth an initial £25.8 million, plus up to £4.2 million in bonus payments. The fee for Lamela made him the most expensive player in the club's history, breaking the two previous records that had been set earlier in the transfer window, first for Paulinho and then Roberto Soldado.

==== 2013–14 season ====
On 1 September, Lamela made his debut for Tottenham as a 75th-minute substitute in a 1–0 North London derby loss to Arsenal at the Emirates Stadium. On 19 September, he made his first start for Tottenham against Tromsø IL in the UEFA Europa League, assisting Jermain Defoe for Tottenham's opening goal in a 3–0 win at White Hart Lane. On 22 September, he assisted Paulinho's stoppage-time winning goal after appearing as a substitute in Tottenham's 1–0 win at Cardiff City.

On 29 October, with Lamela having yet to start a Premier League match, Tottenham manager André Villas-Boas said of the player, "He knows he isn't producing half of what he can produce, but he understands the situation now is that he has to compete for his place." On 7 November, Lamela scored his first goal for the club in a 2–1 Europa League win against Sheriff Tiraspol. Seventeen days later, he made his first start in the Premier League as Tottenham were beaten 6–0 by Manchester City. His season was ended by a back injury in April 2014.

==== 2014–15 season ====
The 2014–15 season saw Lamela establish himself as a regular starter under Mauricio Pochettino, Tottenham's new Argentine manager.

He was named in the starting line-up for the opening match of the 2014–15 Premier League season against West Ham United, making his first appearance of 2014. He repaid his new manager's faith in the following two games; assisting twice after coming off of the bench in a 2–1 win against AEL Limassol on 21 August, and assisting twice more in a 4–0 win against Queens Park Rangers three days later at White Hart Lane.

Lamela scored his first goals of the season on 23 October, a brace in a 5–1 victory over Greek club Asteras Tripolis in the Europa League. His first goal was a rabona-style strike from outside the area, the goal being praised by the BBC as brilliant and by ITV as "world-class." This goal would later be named as the Europa League 'Goal of the Season'. His first Premier League goal came on 20 December in a 2–1 win against Burnley at White Hart Lane.

On 1 March 2015, Lamela played in the League Cup final, coming off of the bench in the 71st minute as Tottenham lost 2–0 to Chelsea.

Lamela finished the season with a return of only two Premier League goals, six in all competitions. However, he was the team's leading provider of assists, with a total of ten in all competitions.

==== 2015–16 season ====
Lamela continued to be a key player in Pochettino's Tottenham side in the 2015–16 season, helping the side to a club-record third-place finish in the Premier League.

Lamela would prove prolific in the group stages of the UEFA Europa League. His first goal of the season came in a 3–1 win over Qarabağ FK on 17 September 2015. On 1 October, he scored away against Monaco. On 10 December, he scored a hattrick – the first of his professional career – in the reverse fixture.

On 26 September, Lamela scored his first Premier League goal of the season in a 4–1 home victory over Manchester City. He finished the season with five Premier League goals, his best total to date.

==== 2016–17 season ====
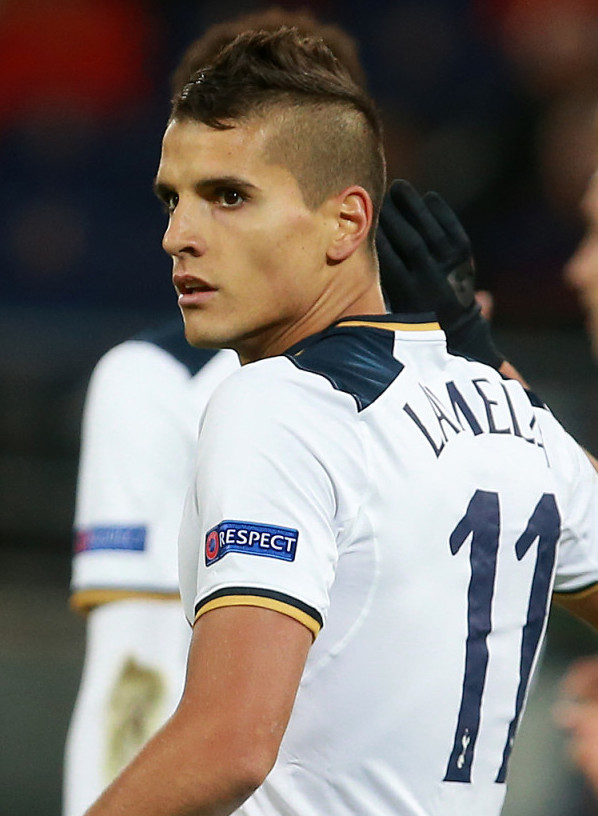
Lamela playing for Tottenham Hotspur in 2016

Lamela scored with a second half header on the opening day of the 2016–17 season in a 1–1 draw against Everton at Goodison Park. However, a hip injury in late October left him unfit for matches for a long period and ended his season.

==== 2017–18 season ====
After more than a year out due to the hip injury that required two operations, Lamela appeared in the Premier League away game against Leicester on 28 November 2017 as a substitute. He assisted in the only goal for Spurs, but the game ended in a 2–1 loss. He followed that up with his first league start of the season in a 2–0 home win against Brighton on 13 December 2017. He scored his first goal of the season in the 2–0 win against Newport County in the fourth round replay of the FA Cup on 7 February 2018.

==== 2018–19 season ====
On 20 July 2018, Lamela signed a new four-year extension to his contract with Tottenham until 2022.

Lamela scored his first goal of the 2018–19 season after coming on as a substitute in the game against Liverpool that Spurs lost 2–1. He also scored in the next league game against Brighton in a 2–1 win, followed by another goal in the next game in the EFL Cup against Watford. On 3 October, Lamela scored Tottenham's second goal in a 4–2 defeat at home to Barcelona in the 2018–19 UEFA Champions League group stage; it was the 8,000th goal in the history of the Champions League. He made his first league start of the season in the away match against West Ham United, scoring the only goal that secured a 1–0 win. He was an unused substitute in the 2019 UEFA Champions League Final in which Spurs lost 2–0 to Liverpool.

==== 2019–20 season ====
Lamela scored his first goal of the 2019–20 season against Manchester City on 17 August 2019. He later registered his first assist of the season in the same match, setting up Lucas Moura's goal, and helping Tottenham to a 2–2 away draw.

==== 2020–21 season ====
Lamela was a starter in the Carabao Cup fourth round match against Chelsea. He equalized with his first goal of the season, then scored his penalty in the 5–4 penalty shootout win after a 1–1 draw. In January 2021, he was fined after breaking the COVID-19 regulations by attending a Christmas party, and was left off the team in a number of games. On 14 March, Lamela came off the bench and scored a rabona to help Spurs take the lead in the North London derby, but he was subsequently sent off for a second yellow card and Spurs fell to a 2–1 defeat. The goal was voted Goal of the Season by Match of the Day. The goal also later won the 2021 FIFA Puskás Award as the best goal of the year.

=== Sevilla ===
On 26 July 2021, Lamela left Tottenham, signing for Sevilla in a swap deal for Bryan Gil. He scored two goals on his La Liga debut in a 3–0 victory over Rayo Vallecano. He scored four goals and assisted twice in the first four months at the club, however, he suffered a shoulder injury while training in November 2021, and was out for four months.

In May 2023, he scored a goal in extra time in the Europa League semi-final against Juventus to win 3–2 on aggregate, which sent Sevilla to the final. There, facing his former club Roma, Lamela scored Sevilla's second penalty in the penalty shoot-out following a 1–1 tie after extra time. Sevilla eventually won 4–1 on penalties, earning Lamela his first professional career title. In May 2024, Lamela left Sevilla following the expiration of his contract.

=== AEK Athens ===
On 21 July 2024, Lamela signed a three-year deal for Greek club AEK Athens as a free agent, with a club record contract fee of €2.5 million per year, totaling €7.5 million throughout the duration of his contract. On 14 August 2025, Lamela and AEK parted ways before Lamela announced his retirement from professional football. Shortly after, he joined the Sevilla coaching staff.

== International career ==
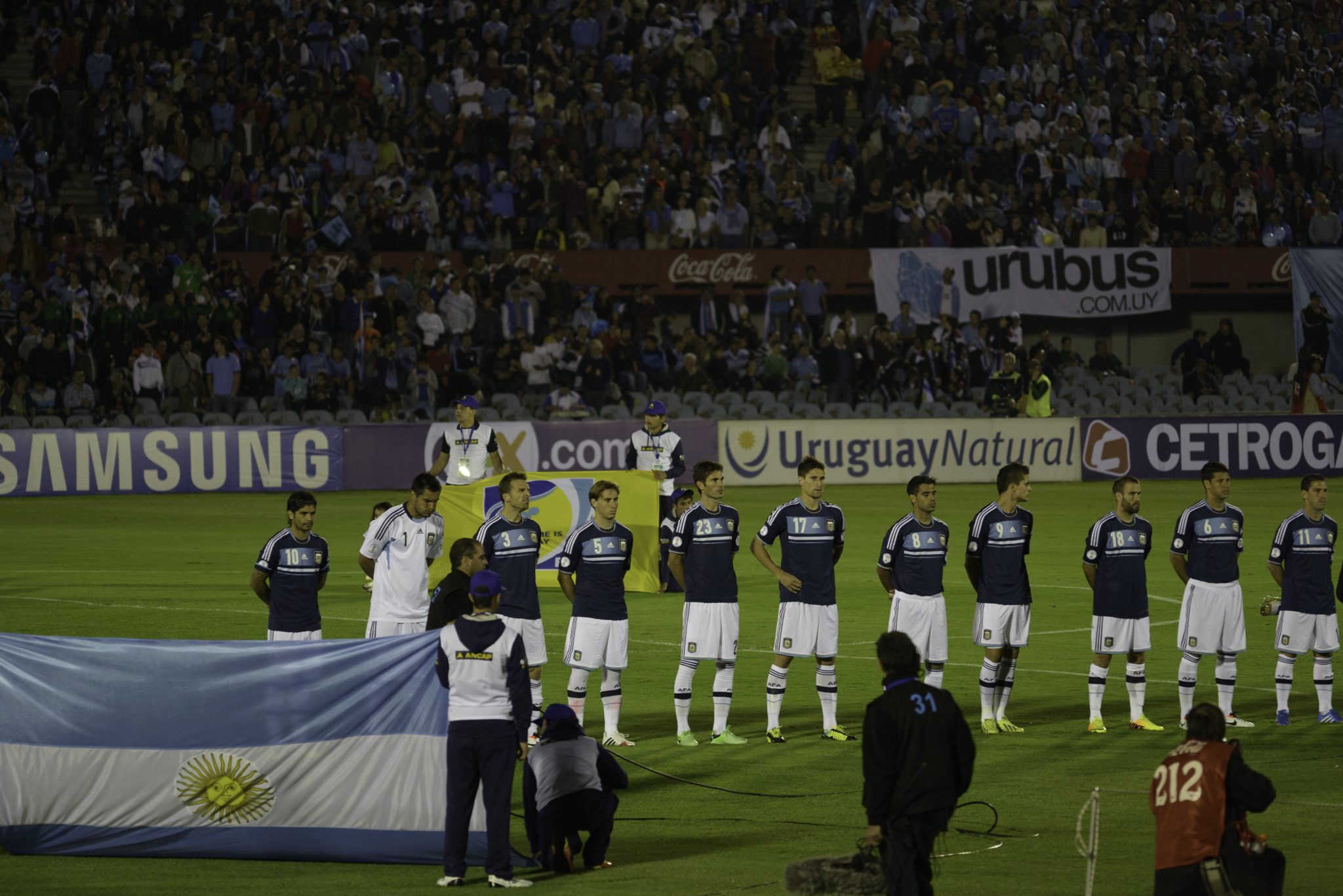
Lamela (fourth from right) lining up for Argentina in 2013, against Uruguay.

Lamela took part in the 2011 FIFA U-20 World Cup with the Argentina national under-20 team and scored three goals in four matches.

Lamela made his debut with the Argentina national team on 25 May 2011 in a friendly game against Paraguay.

On 3 September 2014, Lamela scored his first goal for the senior national team, putting Argentina 2–0 ahead against Germany, in an eventual 4–2 win in a rematch of the World Cup final.

In May 2015, Lamela was selected by coach Gerardo Martino in Argentina's squad for the 2015 Copa América held in Chile.

In 2016, Lamela was selected by coach Gerardo Martino in Argentina's squad for the 2016 Copa América. Lamela was part of the Argentine side that ran to the final. He appeared in all of Argentina's group stage matches, and scored a goal in the 3–0 win against Bolivia with a long-range free kick. He scored again in the 4–1 win in the quarter-final against Venezuela minutes after coming on as a sub. In the final against Chile, he only appeared as a sub in extra time in the 111th minute, which Chile won 4–2 on penalties.

In November 2018, Lamela was recalled to the Argentina national team after a two-year absence.

== Personal life ==
Lamela's partner of many years is Sofia Herrero. The couple have two sons: Tobias, born 2017 and Thiago, born in 2020. He also holds Spanish citizenship, his full name in that document being Erik Manuel Lamela Cordero (Note: In this Spanish name, the first or paternal surname is Lamela and the second or maternal family name is Cordero.).

== Career statistics ==
=== Club ===
Appearances and goals by club, season and competition
Club	Season	League			National cup (Note: Includes Coppa Italia, FA Cup, Copa del Rey, Greek Cup)		League cup (Note: Includes EFL Cup)		Continental		Other		Total	
Club	Season	Division	Apps	Goals	Apps	Goals	Apps	Goals	Apps	Goals	Apps	Goals	Apps	Goals
River Plate	2008–09	Argentine Primera División	1	0	0	0	—		—		—		1	0
River Plate	2009–10	Argentine Primera División	1	0	0	0	—		0	0	—		1	0
River Plate	2010–11	Argentine Primera División	34	4	0	0	—		—		—		34	4
River Plate	Total		36	4	0	0	—		0	0	—		36	4
Roma	2011–12	Serie A	29	4	2	2	—		—		—		31	6
Roma	2012–13	Serie A	33	15	3	0	—		—		—		36	15
Roma	Total		62	19	5	2	—		—		—		67	21
Tottenham Hotspur	2013–14	Premier League	9	0	0	0	2	0	6 (Note: Appearances in UEFA Europa League)	1	—		17	1
Tottenham Hotspur	2014–15	Premier League	33	2	1	0	4	1	8	2	—		46	5
Tottenham Hotspur	2015–16	Premier League	34	5	2	0	0	0	8	6	—		44	11
Tottenham Hotspur	2016–17	Premier League	9	1	0	0	2	1	3 (Note: Appearances in UEFA Champions League)	0	—		14	2
Tottenham Hotspur	2017–18	Premier League	25	2	6	2	0	0	2	0	—		33	4
Tottenham Hotspur	2018–19	Premier League	19	4	1	0	4	1	9	1	—		33	6
Tottenham Hotspur	2019–20	Premier League	25	2	4	1	1	0	5	1	—		35	4
Tottenham Hotspur	2020–21	Premier League	23	1	2	1	2	1	8	1	—		35	4
Tottenham Hotspur	Total		177	17	16	4	15	4	49	12	—		257	37
Sevilla	2021–22	La Liga	20	5	0	0	—		4	0	—		24	5
Sevilla	2022–23	La Liga	32	6	4	1	—		13 (Note: Five appearances in UEFA Champions League, eight appearances and two goals in UEFA Europa League)	2	—		49	9
Sevilla	2023–24	La Liga	13	2	2	0	—		3	0	1 (Note: Appearance in UEFA Super Cup)	0	19	2
Sevilla	Total		65	13	6	1	—		20	2	1	0	92	16
AEK Athens	2024–25	Super League Greece	24	5	5	1	—		2 (Note: Appearances in UEFA Conference League)	0	—		31	6
Career total			364	58	32	8	15	4	71	14	1	0	483	84

=== International ===
Appearances and goals by national team and year
National team	Year	Apps	Goals
Argentina	2011	1	0
Argentina	2012	0	0
Argentina	2013	5	0
Argentina	2014	4	1
Argentina	2015	5	0
Argentina	2016	8	2
Argentina	2017	0	0
Argentina	2018	2	0
Total		25	3

Scores and results list Argentina's goal tally first.

List of international goals scored by Erik Lamela
No.	Date	Venue	Opponent	Score	Result	Competition
1	3 September 2014	Esprit Arena, Düsseldorf, Germany	Germany	2–0	4–2	Friendly
2	14 June 2016	CenturyLink Field, Seattle, United States	Bolivia	1–0	3–0	Copa América Centenario
3	18 June 2016	Gillette Stadium, Foxborough, United States	Venezuela	4–1	4–1	Copa América Centenario

== Honours ==
Tottenham Hotspur

- Football League / EFL Cup runner-up: 2014–15, 2020–21

Sevilla

- UEFA Europa League: 2022–23

Argentina

- Copa América runner-up: 2015, 2016

Individual

- Premier League Goal of the Month: March 2021
- Premier League Goal of the Season: 2020–21
- FIFA Puskás Award: 2021
- Super League Greece Goal of the Season: 2024–25

== See also ==
- List of Tottenham Hotspur F.C. players
