= Willie Bulloch =

Scottish footballer

Personal information
- Full name: William Bulloch
- Date of birth: 18 February 1883
- Place of birth: Larkhall, Scotland
- Date of death: 10 February 1954 (aged 70)
- Place of death: Govan, Scotland
- Height: 5 ft 9 in (1.75 m)
- Position: Left back

Senior career*
Years	Team	Apps	(Gls)
–	Royal Albert		
1906–1908	Port Glasgow Athletic	51	(2)
1908–1909	Tottenham Hotspur	0	(0)
1909–1910	Kilmarnock	5	(2)
1909–1910	→ Royal Albert (loan)		
1910–1923	Partick Thistle	386	(7)
1923–1924	Port Glasgow Athletic		

International career
1911–1914	Scottish League XI	2	(0)
- * Club domestic league appearances and goals

William Bulloch (18 February 1883 – 10 February 1954) was a Scottish footballer who played mainly as a left back.

Although he began his career with short spells elsewhere including Port Glasgow Athletic, Tottenham Hotspur (signing along with Bobby Steel who established himself in London, while Bulloch did not make it out of their reserve team) and Kilmarnock, Bulloch featured primarily for Glasgow club Partick Thistle where he spent thirteen seasons (all in the top division), making 474 appearances for the Jags in all competitions and scoring 8 goals. He was captain of the Partick team that won the Scottish Cup in 1921 with a 1–0 win over Rangers.

Bulloch was selected twice for the Scottish Football League XI, and in 1921 toured North America with 'Scotland' (organised by Third Lanark).
