= Albert Hall (footballer, born 1918) =

Welsh footballer

Personal information
- Full name: Albert Edwards Benjamin Hall
- Date of birth: 3 September 1918
- Place of birth: Barry, Wales
- Date of death: 3 February 1998 (aged 79)
- Place of death: Shrewsbury, England
- Height: 5 ft 5 1/2 in (1.66 m)
- Position: Forward

Youth career
- 1932–1935: Tottenham Hotspur

Senior career*
Years	Team	Apps	(Gls)
1935–1947	Tottenham Hotspur		
1947	Plymouth Argyle	9	(0)
1947–1949	Chelmsford City	10	(3)
- * Club domestic league appearances and goals

Albert Edwards Benjamin Hall (3 September 1918 – 3 February 1998) was a Welsh footballer who played as a forward in the Football League for Tottenham Hotspur and Plymouth Argyle.

== Career ==
Hall played Second Division football for Tottenham Hotspur, having joined the club at the age of 14. He finished the 1938–39 season as the club's joint top-scorer (with Johnny Morrison) with 11 goals. During World War II, he guested for many clubs across the country: Port Vale, Short Brothers, Norwich City, Luton Town, Charlton Athletic, Chelsea, Reading, Millwall and Watford. After the war finished he returned to Joe Hulme's "Spurs", and helped the White Hart Lane club to a sixth-place finish in 1946–47. He then transferred to Plymouth Argyle, who were managed by former Spurs player Jack Tresadern. He made just nine appearances for the "Pilgrims" at the start of the 1947–48 season. He then left Home Park and moved into non-League football with Southern League side Chelmsford City.
