= Ernie Coquet =

English footballer

Personal information
- Full name: Ernest Coquet
- Date of birth: 6 January 1883
- Place of birth: Dunston, England
- Date of death: 26 October 1946 (aged 63)
- Place of death: Gateshead, England
- Height: 5 ft 11 1/2 in (1.82 m)
- Position: Full-back

Youth career
- 1903–1904: Seaham White Star
- 1904–1905: Gateshead Town

Senior career*
Years	Team	Apps	(Gls)
1905–1907	Sunderland	0	(0)
1907–1908	Reading		
1908–1911	Tottenham Hotspur	82	(0)
1911–1913	Port Vale	47	(4)
1913–1914	Fulham	47	(0)
- Leadgate Park
Total		176	(4)
- * Club domestic league appearances and goals

Ernest Coquet (6 January 1883 – 26 October 1946) was an English professional footballer who played as a full-back for Gateshead Town, Reading, Tottenham Hotspur, Port Vale, Fulham, and Leadgate Park. He helped "Spurs" to win promotion out of the Second Division in 1908–09.

== Career ==
Coquet had spells with Seaham White Star and Gateshead Town, before joining Sunderland in 1905. He left the club to join Reading without making a first-team appearance. In 1908, the full-back signed for Tottenham Hotspur, together with Billy Minter, in a combined £500 deal. He helped "Spurs" to win promotion out of the Second Division with a second-place finish in 1908–09, one point behind champions Bolton Wanderers. They went on to post 15th places finishes in the First Division in the 1909–10 and 1910–11 campaigns. In his three seasons at White Hart Lane, he made 76 Football League, eight FA Cup and six Southern League appearances. Coquet then moved onto the Central League club Port Vale, scoring four goals in 51 games and helping the club lift the Staffordshire Senior Cup in the process. He was sold to Fulham for a 'substantial' amount in January 1913. The "Lilywhites" finished eighth and ninth in the Second Division in 1911–12 and 1912–13, and Coquet featured in a further 49 matches at Craven Cottage, before ending his career at Northern League club Leadgate Park.

== Personal life ==
During the First World War, Coquet served in the Football Battalion, the Army Cyclist Corps and the Royal Engineers.

== Career statistics ==
Appearances and goals by club, season and competition
Club	Season	League			FA Cup		Total	
Club	Season	Division	Apps	Goals	Apps	Goals	Apps	Goals
Tottenham Hotspur	1907–08	Southern League	6	0	0	0	6	0
Tottenham Hotspur	1908–09	Second Division	37	0	4	1	41	1
Tottenham Hotspur	1909–10	First Division	27	0	4	0	31	0
Tottenham Hotspur	1910–11	First Division	12	0	0	0	12	0
Total			82	0	8	1	90	1
Port Vale	1911–12	Central League	29	3	0	0	29	3
Port Vale	1912–13	Central League	18	1	4	0	22	1
Port Vale	Total		47	4	4	0	51	4
Fulham	1912–13	Second Division	16	0	—		16	0
Fulham	1913–14	Second Division	12	0	0	0	12	0
Fulham	1914–15	Second Division	19	0	2	0	21	0
Fulham	Total		47	0	2	0	49	0
Career total			176	4	14	1	190	5

== Honours ==
Tottenham Hotspur

- Football League Second Division second-place promotion: 1908–09

Port Vale

- Staffordshire Senior Cup: 1912
