= Percy Hooper =

English footballer

Personal information
- Date of birth: 17 December 1914
- Place of birth: Lambeth, England
- Date of death: July 1997 (aged 82)
- Place of death: King's Lynn, England
- Height: 6 ft 1 in (1.85 m)
- Position: Goalkeeper

Senior career*
| Years | Team | Apps | (Gls) |
| 1934–1939 | Tottenham Hotspur | 97 | |
| 1947–1948 | Swansea Town | 12 | |
- Chingford Town
- King's Lynn
- * Club domestic league appearances and goals

Percy Hooper (17 December 1914 – July 1997) was an English professional footballer who played for Northfleet United, Tottenham Hotspur, Swansea Town, and King's Lynn.

Percy Hooper was a goalkeeper who played for Tottenham Hotspur between 1934 and 1939 making 108 appearances (97 league and 11 F.A. Cup) for the club. During the period of the Second World War, he guested for several teams. In the 1946/7 season he played for Swansea on 12 occasions. In 1948 he moved on to Chingford Town before ending his playing career at King's Lynn.
