= Les Howe (footballer) =

English footballer (1912–1999)

Personal information
- Full name: Leslie Francis Howe
- Date of birth: 5 March 1912
- Place of birth: Bengeo, Hertford, England
- Date of death: 23 February 1999 (aged 86)
- Place of death: Edmonton, London, England
- Height: 5 ft 10 in (1.78 m)
- Position: Midfielder

Senior career*
Years	Team	Apps	(Gls)
- Enfield
- Northfleet United
1930–1939	Tottenham Hotspur	165	(26)
- * Club domestic league appearances and goals

Leslie Francis Howe (3 March 1912 – 23 February 1999) was an English professional footballer who played for Enfield, Northfleet United and Tottenham Hotspur and represented England at schoolboy level.

== Football career ==
Howe played for non-league Enfield before joining the Spurs nursery club Northfleet United. He signed as a professional in August 1930 for Tottenham Hotspur. On 26 December 1930, Howe made his debut at right half at Southampton. He played in every outfield position for the White Hart Lane club which also included an appearance as an emergency goal keeper against Coventry City. The versatile player featured in 182 games and scored 28 goals in all competitions for the Lilywhites until World War II in 1939.

During World War II, Howe played for Aberdeen while stationed there for three weeks in August 1942. In late August, he returned to Tottenham. However, his return to the team was delayed by injury until September. Howe played for Bath in early 1944 and then reported fit to Spurs in late March. In early 1945, he was on leave, scoring goals for Hull City. He then reported back to Spurs in early March.

== Later years ==
Howe served his country in the RAF. After the hostilities had ended Howe returned to the Spurs in the capacity of managing the club's A side. Outside of football he ran public houses in the London area before becoming the manager of Enfield Town F.C. in 1948–49. Howe worked as plumbing supervisor till his retirement in March 1978 and lived in Wood Green. He died on 23 February 1999 at the North Middlesex Hospital, Edmonton.
