= William McNair (footballer) =

Scottish footballer (1885–?)

Personal information
- Date of birth: 29 April 1885
- Place of birth: Renfrew, Scotland
- Position: Forward

Youth career
- Forth Rangers

Senior career*
Years	Team	Apps	(Gls)
1905–1907	Celtic	1	(0)
1905–1906	→ Hamilton Academical (loan)	8	(6)
1906–1907	→ East Stirlingshire (loan)	22	(7)
1907–1908	Tottenham Hotspur	15	(5)
1908–1909	Aberdeen	15	(3)
1909–1910	Reading		
- Alloa Athletic
- * Club domestic league appearances and goals

William McNair (29 April 1885 – ?) was a Scottish footballer who played as a centre forward or outside left for Celtic, Tottenham Hotspur and Aberdeen.

== Career ==
McNair started his career in Scotland with Forth Rangers. He signed for Celtic in January 1905 and played his first game for the club on 11 March 1905 in a friendly, then was known to have played two further matches including a single Scottish Division One appearance against Motherwell in August 1905, before moving out on loan to second-tier Hamilton Academical in December of the same year. He then had a season-long loan to East Stirlingshire in September 1906.

In May 1907, McNair moved to London to play for Tottenham Hotspur for one season, signed as cover for Vivian Woodward. His debut occurred on 2 September 1907 in an away game against Queens Park Rangers in the Southern Football League which finished as a 3–3 draw. In one season with Tottenham he went on to record 27 appearances and seven goals in all competitions.

After one season with Aberdeen, McNair moved south again to play for Reading, his debut occurring on 8 September 1909 in a Southern League game against Leyton. He also played for non-league Alloa Athletic.

== Works cited ==
- Soar, Phil (1995). Tottenham Hotspur The Official Illustrated History 1882–1995. Hamlyn. ISBN 0-600-58706-1.
- Goodwin, Bob (1992). The Spurs Alphabet. ACL & Polar Publishing (UK) Ltd. ISBN 0-9514862-8-4.
