= Doug MacFarlane =

English footballer

Personal information
- Full name: Douglas MacFarlane
- Date of birth: 24 August 1880
- Place of birth: Barrow in Furness, England
- Date of death: 22 April 1965 (aged 84)
- Place of death: Barrow in Furness, England
- Position: Forward

Senior career*
Years	Team	Apps	(Gls)
	Barrow	?	(?)
1903–1907	Burnley	121	(35)
1908–1909	Tottenham Hotspur	21	(2)
	Barrow	?	(?)
- * Club domestic league appearances and goals

Douglas MacFarlane (24 August 1880 – 22 April 1965) was an English professional footballer who played for Barrow, Burnley and Tottenham Hotspur.

== Football career ==
MacFarlane began his career with his home town club Barrow. His goal scoring ability attracted the attention of Burnley where he played 121 matches and found the net on 35 occasions between 1903 and 1907. He signed for Tottenham Hotspur in June 1908 and made his debut in the White Hart Lane club's first fixture in the Football League at home versus Wolverhampton Wanderers on 1 September 1908. The forward featured in 21 matches and scored twice for the Lilywhites before re-joining Barrow to end his playing career.

MacFarlane died in Barrow in Furness on 22 April 1965.
