= Fred Massey =

English footballer (1883–1953)

Personal information
- Full name: Frederick James Massey
- Date of birth: 2 November 1883
- Place of birth: East Ham, England
- Date of death: 26 January 1953 (aged 69)
- Place of death: Watford, Hertfordshire
- Position: Inside right

Senior career*
Years	Team	Apps	(Gls)
1905–1907	Leyton	?	(?)
1907–1909	Tottenham Hotspur	1	(0)
1909–1912	West Ham United	38	(0)
Total		39	(0)
- * Club domestic league appearances and goals

Frederick James Massey (2 November 1883 – 26 January 1953) was an English footballer who played for Leyton, Tottenham Hotspur and West Ham United.

== Football career ==
Massey, an inside right who began his career at Leyton around 1905 and moved to Tottenham Hotspur in the summer of 1907. In his whole time at Spurs he is only recorded as playing five games with his debut on the 14 October 1907 in the Western League against Reading which Tottenham lost 2-0. Massey was retained for the 1908–09 season when Tottenham entered the football league however he only played one game on 27 March 1909 against Gainsborough Trinity which finished as a 1–1 draw. At the end of the season in 1909 Messey was allowed to leave Tottenham and was transferred to West Ham United where he spent three seasons.

== Works cited ==
- Joyce, Michael (2004). Football League Players' Records. soccerdata. p. 179. ISBN 1-899468-63-3.
- Soar, Phil (1995). Tottenham Hotspur The Official Illustrated History 1882–1995. Hamlyn. ISBN 0-600-58706-1.
- Goodwin, Bob (1992). The Spurs Alphabet. ACL & Polar Publishing (UK) Ltd. ISBN 0-9514862-8-4.
