= Arthur Dixon (footballer, born 1879) =

English footballer

Personal information
- Full name: Arthur Dixon
- Date of birth: 5 October 1879
- Place of birth: Barrowford, England
- Date of death: 1946 (aged 66–67)
- Place of death: Nelson, Lancashire
- Position: Full back

Senior career*
Years	Team	Apps	(Gls)
- Trawden Forest
- Nelson
1901–1907	Burnley	175	(7)
1907–1908	Tottenham Hotspur	5	(0)
1908–1913	Bradford Park Avenue	115	(2)
- * Club domestic league appearances and goals

Arthur Dixon (5 October 1879 – January 1946) was an English professional association footballer who played as a full back.

== Career ==
Dixon spent six years with Burnley before moving to Tottenham Hotspur. His debut for Tottenham occurred on 2 September 1907 which was in the Southern League. The game was away at Queens Park Rangers which was a 3–3 draw. He went on to make a total of 12 appearances for Spurs, five in the Southern League, six in the Western League and one other. After one season with Tottenham he moved to Bradford Park Avenue where he was a regular until World War One.

== Works cited ==
- Goodwin, Bob (1992). The Spurs Alphabet. ACL & Polar Publishing (UK) Ltd. ISBN 0-9514862-8-4.
- Joyce, Michael (2004). Football League Players' Records 1888-1939.
