= James Morton (footballer, born 1885) =

Scottish footballer

Personal information
- Full name: James Morton
- Date of birth: 22 August 1885
- Place of birth: Leith, Scotland
- Date of death: 29 July 1926 (aged 40)
- Place of death: Edinburgh, Scotland
- Position: Centre forward

Senior career*
Years	Team	Apps	(Gls)
1905–1906	Newtongrange Star		
1906–1907	Hibernian	25	(7)
1907	Bradford City	0	(0)
1907–1908	Stoke	0	(0)
1908–1909	Tottenham Hotspur	2	(0)
1909	Hibernian	0	(0)
1909–1912	St Bernard's		
1912–1913	Bathgate		
1913–1914	Barnsley	18	(3)
1913–1915	Bristol City	12	(7)
Total		57	(17)
- * Club domestic league appearances and goals

James Morton (22 August 1885 – 29 July 1926) was a Scottish professional footballer who played for Hibernian, Bradford City, Stoke City, Tottenham Hotspur, St Bernard's, Bathgate, Barnsley and Bristol City.

== Career ==
After spells with Newtongrange Star, Hibernian, Bradford City and Stoke, Morton joined Tottenham Hotspur in 1908. The centre forward played twice for the Spurs. He re-joined Hibernian before playing for St Bernard's and Bathgate. In 1913 he joined Barnsley where he featured in 18 matches and scored three goals. Morton went on to sign for Bristol City where featured in a further 12 matches and netting seven times before ending his playing career.

After his playing career had ended he became a trainer at Nuneaton. Morton died at his home in Edinburgh on 29 July 1926 after a long illness.

== Career statistics ==
Club	Season	League			FA Cup		Total	
Club	Season	Division	Apps	Goals	Apps	Goals	Apps	Goals
Hibernian	1906–07	Scottish Division One	13	4	7	3	20	7
Hibernian	1907–08	Scottish Division One	12	3	1	1	13	4
Hibernian	Total		25	7	8	4	33	11
Bradford City	1907–08	Second Division	0	0	0	0	0	0
Stoke	1907–08	Second Division	0	0	0	0	0	0
Tottenham Hotspur	1908–09	Second Division	2	0	0	0	2	0
Barnsley	1913–14	Second Division	18	3	0	0	18	3
Bristol City	1913–14	Second Division	4	1	0	0	4	1
Bristol City	1914–15	Second Division	8	6	0	0	8	6
Bristol City	Total		12	7	0	0	12	7
Career total			57	17	8	4	65	21
