= Tom Collins (footballer) =

Scottish footballer

Personal information
- Full name: Thomas Collins
- Date of birth: 16 April 1882
- Place of birth: Leven, Scotland
- Date of death: 30 July 1929 (aged 47)
- Place of death: London, England
- Height: 5 ft 10 in (1.78 m)
- Position: Full back

Senior career*
Years	Team	Apps	(Gls)
- Leven Thistle
1903–1905	Heart of Midlothian	22	(0)
1905	→ Bathgate (loan)		
1905–1906	East Fife		
1906–1910	Heart of Midlothian	136	(1)
1910–1915	Tottenham Hotspur	113	(1)

International career
1909	Scotland	1	(0)
1909–1910	Scottish League XI	2	(0)
- * Club domestic league appearances and goals

Thomas Collins (16 April 1882 – 30 July 1929) was a Scottish footballer who played for Heart of Midlothian, Bathgate, East Fife and Tottenham Hotspur.

The full back transferred to Tottenham from Hearts (where he had featured on the losing side in the 1907 Scottish Cup Final) in 1910 for a fee of £825. Collins made a total of 122 appearances in all competitions for Spurs between 1910 and 1915 and scored a solitary goal for the club. English football was then suspended; Collins spent time back in Scotland and made some guest appearances for East Fife.

== International career ==
While with Hearts, Collins represented Scotland on one occasion, a 1909 British Home Championship match against Wales. He was selected for the Home Scots v Anglo-Scots trial match twice after he moved to Tottenham, but did not gain another full cap.

== Military service ==
Collins served in the Royal Field Artillery during World War I; he saw active service in France and in 1917 suffered near-fatal injuries in a shell blast, with his left arm and leg having to be amputated (he later had an artificial leg fitted).

== Career statistics ==
=== International ===
Appearances and goals by national team and year
National team	Year	Apps	Goals
Scotland	1909	1	0
Total		1	0
