= Bobby Steel =

Scottish footballer

Personal information
- Full name: Robert Loudon Steel
- Date of birth: 25 June 1888
- Place of birth: Newmilns, Scotland
- Date of death: 28 March 1972 (aged 83)
- Position: Inside left

Senior career*
Years	Team	Apps	(Gls)
- Newmilns
- Kilwinning Rangers
1906–1908	Greenock Morton	0	(0)
1906–1908	→ Port Glasgow Athletic (loan)	50	(7)
1908–1919	Tottenham Hotspur	226	(41)
1919–1920	Gillingham	19	(3)
- * Club domestic league appearances and goals

Robert Loudon Steel (25 June 1888 – 1972) was a professional footballer who played for clubs including Greenock Morton, Port Glasgow Athletic, Tottenham Hotspur and Gillingham.

== Career ==
Steel joined Tottenham Hotspur in 1908 from Port Glasgow (along with Willie Bulloch, who soon returned to Scotland) and played mainly in the inside left position, although he was versatile and willing to fill in several roles, including in defence. He featured in 245 games and scored 45 goals in all competitions (but not counting unofficial fixtures during World War I) before joining Gillingham at the end the conflict – featuring in the 1919–20 Southern Football League – and later becoming a referee.

=== International ===
While at Tottenham, he was selected for the annual Home Scots v Anglo-Scots trial match in 1909 but never played for Scotland at full international level.

== Personal life ==
His brothers Danny and Alex were also footballers, with Danny also having a significant spell at Tottenham Hotspur and Alex spending time with FC Barcelona; the three siblings played together in one Football League fixture against Bradford City in January 1910.
