= Fred Boreham =

English footballer

Personal information
- Full name: Frederick Boreham
- Date of birth: 8 July 1885
- Place of birth: Rye, East Sussex, England
- Date of death: July 1951 (aged 65–66)
- Place of death: Hastings, East Sussex
- Position: Goalkeeper

Senior career*
Years	Team	Apps	(Gls)
1906–1907	Tunbridge Wells Rangers		
- Leyton
1908–1910	Tottenham Hotspur	20	
1910–Unknown	Leyton		
- * Club domestic league appearances and goals

Frederick Boreham (8 July 1885 – 1951) was an English professional footballer who played for Tunbridge Wells Rangers, Tottenham Hotspur and Leyton.

== Football career ==
After spells with Tunbridge Wells Rangers and Leyton, Boreham joined Tottenham Hotspur in May 1908. His debut occurred almost a year later in March 1909 in the London Challenge Cup competition where Tottenham lost to Millwall Athletic 2–0. This was directly followed by his football league debut against Gainsborough Trinity which finished 1–1. The goalkeeper played a total of 35 matches and 20 in the league for the "Lilywhites". He returned to Leyton where he ended his career.

== Works cited ==
- Soar, Phil (1995). Tottenham Hotspur The Official Illustrated History 1882–1995. Hamlyn. ISBN 0-600-58706-1.
- Goodwin, Bob (1992). The Spurs Alphabet. ACL & Polar Publishing (UK) Ltd. ISBN 0-9514862-8-4.
