= Alex Lindsay (footballer) =

Scottish footballer

Personal information
- Full name: Alexander Findlay Lindsay
- Date of birth: 8 November 1896
- Place of birth: Dundee, Scotland
- Date of death: 9 December 1971 (aged 75)
- Place of death: Dundee, Scotland
- Height: 5 ft 7 1/2 in (1.71 m)
- Position: Forward

Senior career*
Years	Team	Apps	(Gls)
1913–1916	Dundee Violet		
1916–1919	Raith Rovers	28	(8)
1919–1929	Tottenham Hotspur	209	(40)
1930–1931	Thames	25	(1)
1931–1932	Dundee	2	(0)
- * Club domestic league appearances and goals

Alexander Findlay Lindsay (8 November 1896 – 9 December 1971) was a professional footballer who played for Raith Rovers, Tottenham Hotspur, Thames and Dundee.

== Football career ==
Born in Dundee, Lindsay joined Tottenham Hotspur from Raith Rovers in 1919 (he had only played one season of Scottish Football League fixtures with the Kirkcaldy club, with the absence due to commitments relating to World War I). The centre forward played a total of 224 matches and scored on 48 occasions in all competitions for the Lilywhites. He joined Thames in 1930 where he completed a further 25 games, netting a solitary goal. Lindsay ended his football career at Dundee.
