= Bill Whatley (footballer) =

Welsh footballer

Personal information
- Full name: William Whatley
- Date of birth: 12 October 1912
- Place of birth: Ebbw Vale, Wales
- Date of death: 1 December 1974 (aged 62)
- Place of death: Shooter's Hill, England
- Height: 5 ft 7 1/2 in (1.71 m)
- Position: Left back

Senior career*
Years	Team	Apps	(Gls)
1930–1931	Ebbw Vale		
1931–1932	Northfleet United		
1932–1939	Tottenham Hotspur	226	(2)

International career
1938	Wales	2	(0)

Managerial career
- Gravesend and Northfleet
- * Club domestic league appearances and goals

William Whatley (12 October 1912 – 1 December 1974) was a professional footballer who played for Tottenham Hotspur and was also a Welsh international footballer during the latter part of the 1930s.

== Career ==
Bill Whatley joined Tottenham Hotspur from Ebbw Vale as an amateur on 31 December 1931. During his early days at Spurs he played for Barnet F.C. on occasion alongside other young Welsh Tottenham players, Taffy O'Callaghan and Ron Burgess, before making his debut for the first team in 1932. Playing as full-back he made 254 appearances scoring two goals during his career, which was interrupted by the start of the Second World War in 1939. During the latter part of his playing career in 1938 he was in competition for his first team place with Bill Nicholson.

He played for Wales against England in the 1938 British Home Championship when the Welsh won 4–2 at Ninian Park. Later the same year he played alongside fellow Spurs player Ron Burgess and after war broke out in a 'Wartime International' match, again against England in a match which was drawn 1–1. He also won representative honours whilst with the Forces.

After retiring as a player he continued as a coach and scout for Tottenham. After leaving Spurs he went on to manage Gravesend and Northfleet.
