= Charlie Woodruff =

English footballer

Personal information
- Full name: Charles Lewis Woodruff
- Date of birth: 19 January 1884
- Place of birth: Grantham, England
- Date of death: 17 July 1943
- Place of death: Grantham, England
- Position: Outside right

Senior career*
Years	Team	Apps	(Gls)
- Grantham Avenue
1908−1910	Tottenham Hotspur	10	(1)
1910−1913	Doncaster Rovers		(18)
1913−1916	Grantham Town		
- * Club domestic league appearances and goals

Charles Lewis Woodruff (19 January 1884 – 17 July 1943) was an English professional footballer who played for Grantham Avenue, Tottenham Hotspur, Doncaster Rovers and Grantham Town.

== Career ==
Woodruff began his career at his local Non league club Grantham Avenue. The outside right joined Tottenham Hotspur in 1908 and scored one goal in 10 appearances for the Lilywhites. After leaving White Hart Lane, Woodruff went on to play for Doncaster Rovers and finally ending his career at Grantham Town from 1913, playing in some war games till 1916.
