= Bert Middlemiss =

English footballer

Personal information
- Full name: Herbert Middlemiss
- Date of birth: 19 December 1888
- Place of birth: Newcastle upon Tyne, England
- Date of death: 28 June 1941 (aged 52)
- Place of death: Brixham, Torbay, Devon, England
- Position: Outside left

Senior career*
Years	Team	Apps	(Gls)
- Stalybridge Rovers
1907–1919	Tottenham Hotspur	270	(59)
1920	Queens Park Rangers	16	(1)
Total		286	(75)
- * Club domestic league appearances and goals

Herbert Middlemiss (19 December 1888 – 28 June 1941) was an English professional footballer who played for Stalybridge Rovers, Tottenham Hotspur and Queens Park Rangers.

== Football career ==
The outside left began his career at Stalybridge Rovers and at some point had signed contract papers with Stockport County. Due to this issue when Tottenham signed the player they had to pay an unknown transfer fee to Stockport. Middlemiss officially became a Tottenham player in November 1907 and played his home debut for the club on the 16 November in a Southern League game against Brentford that finished 1–0. Between 1907 and 1920 Middlemiss played a total of 304 matches and found the net on 70 occasions in all competitions for the club. Middlemiss was released in June 1920 and was then signed by Queens Park Rangers and featured in 16 games and scoring once.

== Personal ==
He was youngest of 4 brothers to Thomas Middlemiss and Hannah Collins [later Forsyth]. He married May Elizabeth Lockwood in 1915 and died in Devon in 1941. Herbert and May had two children Herbert F and Beryl M D.

== Works cited ==
- Soar, Phil (1995). Tottenham Hotspur The Official Illustrated History 1882–1995. Hamlyn. ISBN 0-600-58706-1.
- Goodwin, Bob (1992). The Spurs Alphabet. ACL & Polar Publishing (UK) Ltd. ISBN 0-9514862-8-4.
- Joyce, Michael (2004). Football League Players' Records. soccerdata. ISBN 1-899468-63-3.
