= Johnny Morrison (footballer) =

English footballer (1911–1984)

Personal information
- Full name: John Alfred Morrison
- Date of birth: 26 March 1911
- Place of birth: Belvedere, England
- Date of death: 13 September 1984 (aged 73)
- Height: 5 ft 9 in (1.75 m)
- Position: Centre forward

Senior career*
Years	Team	Apps	(Gls)
- Bostall Heath
- Callender's Athletic
1931	Tottenham Hotspur	0	(0)
1931–1932	Northfleet United		
1932–1939	Tottenham Hotspur	155	(104)
- * Club domestic league appearances and goals

John Alfred Morrison (26 March 1911 – 13 September 1984) was a professional footballer who played for Bostall Heath, Callender's Athletic, Tottenham Hotspur and Northfleet United.

== Football career ==
Morrison began his career at non–league Bostall Heath before being given a trial at Luton Town in 1929. After playing for Kent side Callenders Athletic he joined the Spurs in 1931 for his first spell at the club. He moved to the Tottenham Hotspur nursery club Northfleet United before rejoining the White Hart Lane side in 1932. The free-scoring centre forward played a total of 154 matches and found the net on 102 occasions in all competitions up to the outbreak of the Second World War in 1939. As of March 2023, Morrison is one of only eighteen players to score one hundred goals for the Lilywhites.
