= Danny Steel =

Scottish footballer

Personal information
- Full name: Daniel Steel
- Date of birth: 2 May 1884
- Place of birth: Newmilns, Scotland
- Date of death: 29 April 1931 (aged 46)
- Place of death: Marylebone, England
- Positions: Centre half; wing half

Senior career*
Years	Team	Apps	(Gls)
- Newmilns
1903–1904	Airdrieonians	0	(0)
1904–1906	Rangers	2	(0)
1906–1912	Tottenham Hotspur	129	(3)
1912–1914	Third Lanark	47	(1)
1914	→ Dumbarton (loan)	5	(0)
1914–1916	Clapton Orient	23	
- * Club domestic league appearances and goals

Daniel Steel (2 May 1884 – 29 April 1931) was a Scottish professional footballer who played for clubs including Rangers, Tottenham Hotspur, Third Lanark, Dumbarton and Clapton Orient.

== Career ==
Steel played principally as a centre half, although in his initial appearances for Rangers he played at inside left. Notwithstanding his status as an inexperienced reserve player, the statistical summary of his time at Ibrox ranks among the worst of all those who have played a senior game for the club, with his six appearances including a 5–0 defeat to Partick Thistle in the Glasgow Merchants Charity Cup, and heavy losses to Airdrieonians and Heart of Midlothian (5–0 and 5–1 respectively) in the opening months of the 1905–06 Scottish Division One season.

Steel recovered from this setback, even after spending another two years in the background at Tottenham Hotspur following his move there in 1906, by going on to establish himself and make 141 appearances in all competitions for Spurs (scoring four goals) between 1908 and 1912 before he moved back to Scotland with Third Lanark.

He joined Clapton Orient in December 1914 and featured in 23 matches.

=== International ===
While at Tottenham, he was selected for the annual Home Scots v Anglo-Scots trial match on three occasions (1908, 1910 and 1912) but never played for Scotland at full international level.

== Personal life ==
His younger brothers Bobby and Alex were also footballers, with Bobby also having a significant spell at Tottenham Hotspur; the three siblings played together in one Football League fixture against Bradford City in January 1910.
