= Bert Bliss =

English association football player

Personal information
- Full name: Herbert Bliss
- Date of birth: 29 March 1890
- Place of birth: Willenhall, England
- Date of death: 14 June 1968 (aged 78)
- Height: 5 ft 6 in (1.68 m)
- Position: Inside forward

Senior career*
Years	Team	Apps	(Gls)
1912–1922	Tottenham Hotspur	194	(92)
1922–1925	Clapton Orient	70	(20)
1925–1926	Bournemouth & Boscombe Athletic	6	(0)
Total		270	(112)

International career
1921	England	1	(0)
- * Club domestic league appearances and goals

Herbert Bliss (29 March 1890 – 14 June 1968) was an English footballer who played for Tottenham Hotspur, Clapton Orient and England. He was born in Willenhall, Staffordshire.

== Career ==
Bert Bliss was an inside forward who joined Tottenham from Willenhall Swifts for £10 on 12 April 1912. He had a reputation for speed, accurate passing and riffling shots on goal.

He played for Spurs between 1912 and 1922 during which time he made 215 appearances and scored 106 goals. He was a member of the team, which was promoted to the Football League First Division in 1920 and won the FA Cup in 1921. His direct play and accurate passing was a notable feature of the game and he was also instrumental in Spurs scoring the only goal of the match against Wolverhampton Wanderers.

He was transferred to Clapton Orient on 22 December 1922. After this he played for Bournemouth & Boscombe Athletic before retiring in 1926.

Bert played one game at International level for England against Scotland on 9 April 1921 (two weeks before the FA Cup Final) and alongside three other Spurs players, Jimmy Dimmock, Arthur Grimsdell and Bert Smith.

== Career statistics ==
=== International ===
Appearances and goals by national team and year
National team	Year	Apps	Goals
England	1921	1	0
Total		1	0

== Honours ==
Tottenham Hotspur

- FA Cup: 1920–21
