= 2022–23 Tottenham Hotspur F.C. season =

English football club season

Tottenham Hotspur
2022–23 season
- Owner: ENIC International Ltd.
- Chairman: Daniel Levy
- Head coach: Antonio Conte (until 26 March); Cristian Stellini (interim, from 26 March to 24 April); Ryan Mason (interim, from 24 April)
- Stadium: Tottenham Hotspur Stadium
- Premier League: 8th
- FA Cup: Fifth round
- EFL Cup: Third round
- UEFA Champions League: Round of 16
- Top goalscorer: League: Harry Kane (30); All: Harry Kane (32)
- Highest home attendance: 62,008 v Liverpool, Premier League, 6 November 2022
- Lowest home attendance: League: 61,093 v Crystal Palace, 6 May 2023; All: 55,180 v Eintracht Frankfurt, Champions League, 12 October 2022
- Average home league attendance: 61,585
- Biggest win: 6–2 v Leicester City, Premier League, 17 September 2022; 4–0 v Crystal Palace, Premier League, 4 January 2023
- Biggest defeat: 1–6 v Newcastle United, Premier League, 23 April 2023
Home colours	Away colours	Third colours

The 2022–23 season was Tottenham Hotspur's 31st season in the Premier League, 45th consecutive season in the top flight of the English football league system and 141st season in existence. In addition to the domestic league, they participated in the season's FA Cup, EFL Cup and UEFA Champions League, having finished fourth in the 2021–22 Premier League.

On 26 March 2023, Tottenham announced that head coach Antonio Conte had left the club by mutual agreement. On the same day, Cristian Stellini took charge as the acting head coach until the end of the season. On 24 April 2023, following a 6–1 loss to Newcastle United, Stellini was sacked and replaced by Ryan Mason.

== Season overview ==
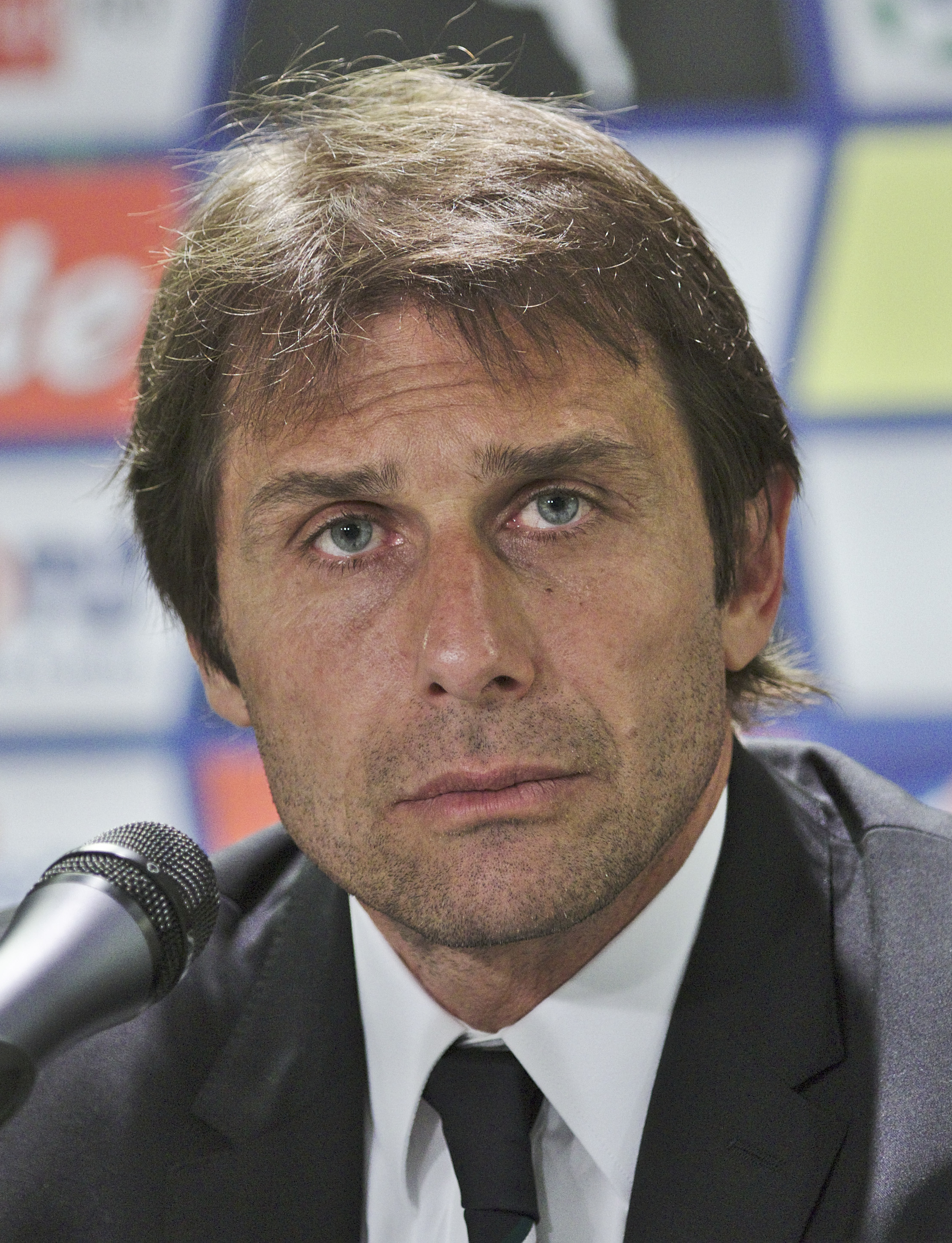
Antonio Conte, manager of Tottenham Hotspur until 26 March 2023

Tottenham's season started with a 4–1 home win against Southampton. The club then went on a seven-game unbeaten run in the league, which saw Tottenham beat Leicester City 6–2 with Son Heung-min coming off the bench to score a second half hat-trick. After the international break, the players returned for an away game on 1 October against North London rivals Arsenal losing 3–1 and ending their Premier League undefeated streak. Tottenham went on to win their next two matches against Brighton & Hove Albion and Everton; however, their form dropped with multiple losses in the league in October and November against Manchester United, Newcastle United and Liverpool. On the final game before the World Cup break, Tottenham defeated Leeds United 4–3.

In the Champions League, Tottenham had good enough form to top their group with a double win over Marseille and a home win against Eintracht Frankfurt. Their only loss was away to Sporting CP in Portugal. For the round of 16, Tottenham were drawn against seven-time winners AC Milan, to be played in February and March 2023.

Tottenham entered the third round of the EFL Cup and were drawn away to Nottingham Forest. Forest at the time were bottom of the league and struggling to find form. The match took place on 9 November, and Tottenham started with what was considered a strong squad. However, the game resulted in a 2–0 defeat, with goals from Renan Lodi and Jesse Lingard knocking the club out of the competition.

The winter break came early due to the 2022 FIFA World Cup in Qatar. After the World Cup, Tottenham only played one game in December, against Brentford, which ended as a 2–2 draw.

In January and February, Tottenham's league form was up and down. They first lost 2–0 at home to Aston Villa on New Year's Day, but then thrashed Crystal Palace 4–0. Tottenham then had a difficult run of games against Arsenal, Manchester City, Fulham and then Manchester City again.

Tottenham advanced to the fifth round of the FA Cup defeating Portsmouth 1–0 in the third round, and defeating Preston North End 3–0 in the fourth round.

In February, Conte returned to Italy to have surgery to remove his gallbladder, leaving Cristian Stellini in charge. Under Stellini, Tottenham played their round of 16 Champions League match, first away in Milan, losing 1–0. The home game played on 8 March was a goalless draw, knocking Tottenham out of the Champions League. The game also saw Cristian Romero get sent off for a second yellow card.

Stellini's Tottenham had mixed results, including being knocked out of the FA Cup by Sheffield United. On 26 March, Conte was sacked a day after showing his frustration in a news conference after a 3–3 draw at Southampton. Stellini was only in charge for four more games, the last being a crushing 6–1 loss at Newcastle, Tottenham's worst defeat of the season, after which Stellini was sacked and replaced with assistant coach Ryan Mason. Mason was in charge for six games, winning two, losing three and drawing one. On the last day of the season, Tottenham beat Leeds United 4–1 away from home and finishing in eighth place, the club's worst league position since the 2008–09 season. This was also Lucas Moura's last game for the club, as he scored the final goal of the game.

== Season squad ==
Squad no.	Player	Nationality	Position(s)	Date of birth (age)
Goalkeepers
1	Hugo Lloris (C)	(France)	GK	26 December 1986 (aged 36)
20	Fraser Forster	(England)	GK	17 March 1988 (aged 35)
40	Brandon Austin	(United States)	GK	7 January 1999 (aged 24)
41	Alfie Whiteman	(England)	GK	2 October 1998 (aged 24)
Defenders
6	Davinson Sánchez	(Colombia)	CB	12 June 1996 (aged 27)
12	Emerson Royal	(Brazil)	RWB / RB	14 January 1999 (aged 24)
15	Eric Dier	(England)	CB	15 January 1994 (aged 29)
17	Cristian Romero	(Argentina)	CB	27 April 1998 (aged 25)
19	Ryan Sessegnon	(England)	LWB / LB	18 May 2000 (aged 23)
23	Pedro Porro	(Spain)	RWB / RB	13 September 1999 (aged 23)
25	Japhet Tanganga	(England)	RB / CB	31 March 1999 (aged 24)
33	Ben Davies	(Wales)	CB / LWB	24 April 1993 (aged 30)
34	Clément Lenglet	(France)	CB	17 June 1995 (aged 28)
Midfielders
4	Oliver Skipp	(England)	DM / CM	16 September 2000 (aged 22)
5	Pierre-Emile Højbjerg	(Denmark)	DM / CM	5 August 1995 (aged 27)
14	Ivan Perišić	(Croatia)	LWB / LW / LB	2 February 1989 (aged 34)
29	Pape Matar Sarr	(Senegal)	CM	14 September 2002 (aged 20)
30	Rodrigo Bentancur	(Uruguay)	DM / CM	25 June 1997 (aged 26)
38	Yves Bissouma	(Mali)	DM / CM	30 August 1996 (aged 26)
Forwards
7	Son Heung-min	(South Korea)	LW / ST	8 July 1992 (aged 30)
9	Richarlison	(Brazil)	ST / LW / RW	10 April 1997 (aged 26)
10	Harry Kane (VC)	(England)	ST	28 July 1993 (aged 29)
16	Arnaut Danjuma	(Netherlands)	LW / ST	31 January 1997 (aged 26)
21	Dejan Kulusevski	(Sweden)	RW / AM	25 April 2000 (aged 23)
27	Lucas Moura	(Brazil)	RW / LW / ST	13 August 1992 (aged 30)
Out on loan
3	Sergio Reguilón	(Spain)	LWB / LB	16 December 1996 (aged 26)
8	Harry Winks	(England)	DM / CM	2 February 1996 (aged 27)
11	Bryan Gil	(Spain)	LW / RW / AM	11 February 2001 (aged 22)
18	Giovani Lo Celso	(Argentina)	CM / AM	9 April 1996 (aged 27)
22	Joe Rodon	(Wales)	CB	22 October 1997 (aged 25)
24	Djed Spence	(England)	RWB / RB	9 August 2000 (aged 22)
28	Tanguy Ndombele	(France)	CM	28 December 1996 (aged 26)
42	Harvey White	(England)	CM / AM	19 September 2001 (aged 21)
–	Destiny Udogie	(Italy)	LB	28 November 2002 (aged 20)

Source: Tottenham Hotspur, Premier League

== Transfers and contracts ==
=== Released ===
Date from	Position	Nationality	Player	To	Notes	Ref.
2 June 2022	LW	(England)	J'Neil Bennett	(England) Brentford	End of contract	
2 June 2022	LB	(England)	Jordan Hackett	(England) Newcastle United	End of contract	
2 June 2022	GK	(France)	Thimothée Lo-Tutala	(England) Hull City	End of contract	
2 June 2022	LB	(England)	Dermi Lusala	(England) Coventry City	End of contract	
2 June 2022	GK	(Nigeria)	Joshua Oluwayemi	(England) Portsmouth	End of contract	
2 June 2022	CB	(England)	Tobi Omole	(England) Crawley Town	End of contract	
2 June 2022	CM	(England)	Oliver Turner	(England) Aldershot Town	End of contract	
2 June 2022	CM	(England)	Jez Davies		End of contract	
2 June 2022	CM	(England)	Khalon Haysman		End of contract	
2 June 2022	GK	(Poland)	Kacper Kurylowicz		End of contract	
2 June 2022	GK	(Norway)	Isak Solberg		End of contract	
2 June 2022	RB	(Albania)	Renaldo Torraj		End of contract	
31 January 2023	RB	(Republic of Ireland)	Matt Doherty	(Spain) Atlético Madrid	Mutual agreement	

- Note: Players will join other clubs after being released or terminated from their contract. Only the following clubs are mentioned when that club signed the player in the same transfer window.

=== Loans in ===
Date from	Position	Nationality	Player	From	Date until	Ref.
31 January 2022	RW	(Sweden)	Dejan Kulusevski	(Italy) Juventus	End of season	
8 July 2022	CB	(France)	Clément Lenglet	(Spain) Barcelona	End of season	
25 January 2023	LW	(Netherlands)	Arnaut Danjuma	(Spain) Villarreal	End of season	
31 January 2023	RWB	(Spain)	Pedro Porro	(Portugal) Sporting	End of season	

=== Loans out ===
Date from	Position	Nationality	Player	To	Date until	Ref.
10 February 2022	GK	(England)	Alfie Whiteman	(Sweden) Degerfors	December 2022	
25 July 2022	CF	(Republic of Ireland)	Troy Parrott	(England) Preston North End	End of season	
27 July 2022	CF	(England)	Dane Scarlett	(England) Portsmouth	End of season	
1 August 2022	CB	(Wales)	Joe Rodon	(France) Rennes	End of season	
14 August 2022	CM	(Argentina)	Giovani Lo Celso	(Spain) Villarreal	End of season	
16 August 2022	LB	(Italy)	Destiny Udogie	(Italy) Udinese	End of season	
19 August 2022	CM	(France)	Tanguy Ndombele	(Italy) Napoli	End of season	
30 August 2022	LB	(Spain)	Sergio Reguilón	(Spain) Atlético Madrid	End of season	
30 August 2022	CM	(England)	Harry Winks	(Italy) Sampdoria	End of season	
30 January 2023	LW	(Spain)	Bryan Gil	(Spain) Sevilla	End of season	
31 January 2023	RB	(England)	Djed Spence	(France) Rennes	End of season	
31 January 2023	CM	(England)	Harvey White	(England) Derby County	End of season	

=== Transfers in ===
Date from	Position	Nationality	Player	From	Fee	Ref.
31 May 2022	LW	(Croatia)	Ivan Perišić	(Italy) Inter Milan	Free	
8 June 2022	GK	(England)	Fraser Forster	(England) Southampton	Free	
17 June 2022	CM	(Mali)	Yves Bissouma	(England) Brighton & Hove Albion	£25,000,000	
1 July 2022	RB	(England)	Tyrell Ashcroft	(England) Reading	Undisclosed	
1 July 2022	GK	(Republic of Ireland)	Josh Keeley	(Republic of Ireland) St Patrick's Athletic	Undisclosed	
1 July 2022	ST	(Brazil)	Richarlison	(England) Everton	£60,000,000	
19 July 2022	RB	(England)	Djed Spence	(England) Middlesbrough	£12,500,000	
16 August 2022	LB	(Italy)	Destiny Udogie	(Italy) Udinese	£15,000,000	
30 August 2022	CB	(Argentina)	Cristian Romero	(Italy) Atalanta	£42,500,000	
31 August 2022	FW	(England)	Will Lankshear	(England) Sheffield United	Undisclosed	
31 January 2023	FW	(England)	Jude Soonsup-Bell	(England) Chelsea	Free	

=== Transfers out ===
Date from	Position	Nationality	Player	To	Fee	Ref.
10 June 2022	CB	(United States)	Cameron Carter-Vickers	(Scotland) Celtic	£6,000,000	
8 July 2022	LW	(Netherlands)	Steven Bergwijn	(Netherlands) Ajax	£26,400,000	
9 July 2022	RW	(England)	Jack Clarke	(England) Sunderland	Undisclosed	
4 August 2022	FW	(England)	Kion Etete	(Wales) Cardiff City	Undisclosed	
1 September 2022	DF	(England)	Marcel Lavinier	(England) Swindon Town	Free	
4 October 2022	DF	(England)	Jayden Meghoma	(England) Southampton	Free	
31 January 2023	GK	(England)	Adam Hayton	(England) Barnsley	Undisclosed	

== Pre-season and friendlies ==
To prepare for the upcoming season, Tottenham played a series of friendlies across the world. The club first met Korean club Team K League and Sevilla in South Korea for the Coupang Play Series on 13 and 16 July 2022, respectively. The team then travelled to Scotland to play Rangers on 23 July 2022 and played Roma in Israel for the I-Tech Cup the following week.

In December, while the season was halted due to the ongoing 2022 FIFA World Cup, Tottenham announced a mid-season friendly behind closed doors against Scottish side Motherwell on 9 December as well as an additional match at home with reduced capacity to French club Nice on 21 December 2022.

=== Pre-season ===
13 July 2022 Coupang Play Series	Team K League	3–6	Tottenham Hotspur	Mapo-gu, South Korea
20:00 KST	Cho Gue-sung 45+2'; Veldwijk 52'; Amano 71'; Kim Dong-min (red card) 73'	Report	Dier 30'; Emerson (yellow card) 39'; Kim Jin-hyuk 47' (o.g.); Kane 54', 75'; Son Heung-min 68' (pen.), 85'	Stadium: Seoul World Cup Stadium; Attendance: 64,100; Referee: Kim Jong-hyeok (South Korea)

16 July 2022 Coupang Play Series	Tottenham Hotspur	1–1	Sevilla	Suwon, South Korea
20:00 KST	Kane 50'	Report	Rakitić 64'	Stadium: Suwon World Cup Stadium; Attendance: 43,998; Referee: Ko Hyung-jin (South Korea)

23 July 2022 Walter Tull Memorial Cup	Rangers	1–2	Tottenham Hotspur	Glasgow, Scotland
15:00 BST	Čolak 24'; Souttar (yellow card) 68'	Report	Kane 50', 56'; Kulusevski (yellow card) 55'	Stadium: Ibrox Stadium; Attendance: 43,036; Referee: John Beaton (Scotland)

30 July 2022 I-Tech Cup	Tottenham Hotspur	0–1	Roma	Haifa, Israel
21:15 IST	Romero (yellow card) 83'	Report	Ibañez 29'; Pellegrini (yellow card) 83'	Stadium: Sammy Ofer Stadium; Attendance: 24,000; Referee: Yigal Frid (Israel)

=== Mid-season ===
9 December 2022	Tottenham Hotspur	4–0	Motherwell	London, England
13:00 GMT	Kulusevski 3'; Doherty 28', 71'; Gil 40'	Report		Stadium: Hotspur Way; Attendance: 0 Referee: Darren England (England)

21 December 2022	Tottenham Hotspur	1–1	Nice	London, England
19:00 GMT	Doherty 21'	Report	Mendy 47'	Stadium: Tottenham Hotspur Stadium; Attendance: 9,173; Referee: Simon Hooper (England)

== Competitions ==
=== Overview ===
Competition	First match	Last match	Starting round	Final position	Record							
Competition	First match	Last match	Starting round	Final position	Pld	W	D	L	GF	GA	GD	Win %
Premier League	6 August 2022	28 May 2023	Matchday 1	8th	38	18	6	14	70	63	+7	47.37
FA Cup	7 January 2023	1 March 2023	Third round	Fifth round	3	2	0	1	4	1	+3	66.67
EFL Cup	9 November 2022		Third round	Third round	1	0	0	1	0	2	−2	0.00
UEFA Champions League	7 September 2022	8 March 2023	Group stage	Round of 16	8	3	3	2	8	7	+1	37.50
Total					50	23	9	18	82	73	+9	46.00

Source: Soccerway

=== Premier League ===
==== League table ====
Pos	Team	Pld	W	D	L	GF	GA	GD	Pts	Qualification or relegation
6	Brighton & Hove Albion	38	18	8	12	72	53	+19	62	Qualification to Europa League group stage (Note: Since the winners of the 2022–23 FA Cup, Manchester City, qualified for the Champions League, the spot given to the FA Cup winners (Europa League group stage) was passed to the sixth-placed team.)
7	Aston Villa	38	18	7	13	51	46	+5	61	Qualification to Europa Conference League play-off round (Note: Since the winners of the 2022–23 EFL Cup, Manchester United, qualified for the Champions League, the spot given to the League Cup winners (Europa Conference League play-off round) was passed to the seventh-placed team.)
8	Tottenham Hotspur	38	18	6	14	70	63	+7	60	
9	Brentford	38	15	14	9	58	46	+12	59	
10	Fulham	38	15	7	16	55	53	+2	52	

Source: Premier League
Rules for classification: 1) Points; 2) Goal difference; 3) Goals scored; 4) If the champions, relegated teams or qualified teams for UEFA competitions cannot be determined by rules 1 to 3, rules 4.1 to 4.3 are applied – 4.1) Points gained in head-to-head record between such teams; 4.2) Away goals scored in head-to-head record between such teams; 4.3) Play-offs

==== Results summary ====
Overall								Home						Away					
Pld	W	D	L	GF	GA	GD	Pts	W	D	L	GF	GA	GD	W	D	L	GF	GA	GD
38	18	6	14	70	63	+7	60	12	1	6	38	25	+13	6	5	8	32	38	−6

Source: Premier League

==== Results by round ====
Round	1	2	3	4	5	6	7	8	9	10	11	12	13	14	15	16	17	18	19	20	21	22	23	24	25	26	27	28	29	30	31	32	33	34	35	36	37	38
Ground	H	A	H	A	A	H	H	A	A	H	A	H	A	H	H	A	H	A	H	A	A	H	A	H	H	A	H	A	A	H	H	A	H	A	H	A	H	A
Result	W	D	W	W	D	W	W	L	W	W	L	L	W	L	W	D	L	W	L	L	W	W	L	W	W	L	W	D	D	W	L	L	D	L	W	L	L	W
Position	1	4	4	3	3	3	3	3	3	3	3	3	3	4	4	4	5	5	5	5	5	5	5	4	4	4	4	4	4	5	5	5	5	6	6	7	8	8
Points	3	4	7	10	11	14	17	17	20	23	23	23	26	26	29	30	30	33	33	33	36	39	39	42	45	45	48	49	50	53	53	53	54	54	57	57	57	60

Source: Premier League
A = Away; H = Home; W = Win; D = Draw; L = Loss

==== Matches ====
The Premier League fixtures were announced on 16 June 2022.

6 August 2022 1	Tottenham Hotspur	4–1	Southampton	Tottenham
15:00 BST	Sessegnon 21', (yellow card) 24'; Dier 31'; Salisu 61' (o.g.); Kulusevski 63'; Bentancur (yellow card) 75'; Bissouma (yellow card) 88'	Report	Ward-Prowse 12'	Stadium: Tottenham Hotspur Stadium; Attendance: 61,732; Referee: Andre Marriner

14 August 2022 2	Chelsea	2–2	Tottenham Hotspur	Fulham
16:30 BST	Koulibaly 19'; James (yellow card) 41', (goal) 77'; Mendy (yellow card) 62'; Havertz (yellow card) 86'; Tuchel (red card) 90+8'	Report	Højbjerg 68'; Kane 90+6'; Conte (red card) 90+8'	Stadium: Stamford Bridge; Attendance: 39,946; Referee: Anthony Taylor

20 August 2022 3	Tottenham Hotspur	1–0	Wolverhampton Wanderers	Tottenham
12:30 BST	Højbjerg (yellow card) 12'; Kane 64', (yellow card) 67'	Report	Aït-Nouri (yellow card) 56'; Collins (yellow card) 67'	Stadium: Tottenham Hotspur Stadium; Attendance: 61,298; Referee: Simon Hooper

28 August 2022 4	Nottingham Forest	0–2	Tottenham Hotspur	West Bridgford
16:30 BST	Cook (yellow card) 56'; Worrall (yellow card) 58'; McKenna (yellow card) 61'; O'Brien (yellow card) 73'; Kouyaté (yellow card) 84'; Johnson (yellow card) 85'	Report	Kane 5', (penalty missed) 56', 81', (yellow card) 83'	Stadium: City Ground; Attendance: 29,926; Referee: Craig Pawson

31 August 2022 5	West Ham United	1–1	Tottenham Hotspur	Stratford
19:45 BST	Souček 55'; Paquetá (yellow card) 90+1'; Emerson (yellow card) 90+1'	Report	Bissouma (yellow card) 21'; Sánchez (yellow card) 23'; Kehrer 34' (o.g.); Davies (yellow card) 86'; Richarlison (yellow card) 90+1'; Perišić (yellow card) 90+3'	Stadium: London Stadium; Attendance: 62,450; Referee: Peter Bankes

3 September 2022 6	Tottenham Hotspur	2–1	Fulham	Tottenham
15:00 BST	Romero (yellow card) 27'; Højbjerg 40'; Bentancur (yellow card) 69'; Kane 75'; Richarlison (yellow card) 90+1'	Report	Tete (yellow card) 36'; Decordova-Reid (yellow card) 55'; Palhinha (yellow card) 63'; Mitrović 83', (yellow card) 86'	Stadium: Tottenham Hotspur Stadium; Attendance: 61,641; Referee: Stuart Attwell

17 September 2022 7	Tottenham Hotspur	6–2	Leicester City	Tottenham
17:30 BST	Kane 8'; Dier 21'; Bentancur 47'; Son Heung-min 73', 84', 86'; Perišić (yellow card) 73'	Report	Tielemans 6' (pen.); Maddison 41'; Ndidi (yellow card) 49'; Daka (yellow card) 61'	Stadium: Tottenham Hotspur Stadium; Attendance: 61,450; Referee: Simon Hooper

1 October 2022 8	Arsenal	3–1	Tottenham Hotspur	Holloway
12:30 BST	Partey 20'; Gabriel Jesus 49'; Xhaka 67'; Saliba (yellow card) 78'; Martinelli (yellow card) 85'	Report	Kane 31' (pen.); Emerson (red card) 62'; Dier (yellow card) 90+3'	Stadium: Emirates Stadium; Attendance: 60,278; Referee: Anthony Taylor

8 October 2022 9	Brighton & Hove Albion	0–1	Tottenham Hotspur	Falmer
17:30 BST	Veltman (yellow card) 49'	Report	Kane (yellow card) 18', (goal) 22'; Bissouma (yellow card) 31'	Stadium: Falmer Stadium; Attendance: 31,498; Referee: Tony Harrington

15 October 2022 10	Tottenham Hotspur	2–0	Everton	Tottenham
17:30 BST	Bentancur (yellow card) 37'; Kane 59' (pen.); Højbjerg 86'	Report	Maupay (yellow card) 12'; McNeil (yellow card) 44'; Gueye (yellow card) 54'; Mykolenko (yellow card) 81'	Stadium: Tottenham Hotspur Stadium; Attendance: 61,812; Referee: Paul Tierney

19 October 2022 11	Manchester United	2–0	Tottenham Hotspur	Trafford
20:15 BST	Fred 47'; Casemiro (yellow card) 52'; Fernandes 69'	Report		Stadium: Old Trafford; Attendance: 73,677; Referee: Simon Hooper

23 October 2022 12	Tottenham Hotspur	1–2	Newcastle United	Tottenham
16:30 BST	Bentancur (yellow card) 31'; Kane 54'; Sessegnon (yellow card) 59'; Skipp (yellow card) 66'; Emerson (yellow card) 90'	Report	Wilson 31', (yellow card) 68'; Almirón 40'; Pope (yellow card) 84'	Stadium: Tottenham Hotspur Stadium; Attendance: 61,726; Referee: Jarred Gillett

29 October 2022 13	Bournemouth	2–3	Tottenham Hotspur	Bournemouth
15:00 BST	Moore 22', 49'; Cook (yellow card) 82'	Report	Sessegnon 57', (yellow card) 61'; Kane (yellow card) 69'; Davies 73'; Bentancur 90+2'	Stadium: Dean Court; Attendance: 10,430; Referee: Anthony Taylor

6 November 2022 14	Tottenham Hotspur	1–2	Liverpool	Tottenham
16:30 GMT	Kane 70'	Report	Salah 11', 40'	Stadium: Tottenham Hotspur Stadium; Attendance: 62,008; Referee: Andrew Madley

12 November 2022 15	Tottenham Hotspur	4–3	Leeds United	Tottenham
15:00 GMT	Kane 25'; Davies 51'; Bentancur (yellow card) 57', (goal) 81', 83'	Report	Summerville 10'; Rodrigo 43', 76'; Roca (yellow card) 49'; Adams (yellow card) 71' (yellow-red card) 87'	Stadium: Tottenham Hotspur Stadium; Attendance: 61,667; Referee: Michael Salisbury

26 December 2022 16	Brentford	2–2	Tottenham Hotspur	Brentford
12:30 GMT	Janelt 15'; Toney 54', (yellow card) 63'; Jensen (yellow card) 59'; Mbeumo (yellow card) 76'	Report	Bissouma (yellow card) 60'; Kane 65'; Højbjerg 71'	Stadium: Brentford Community Stadium; Attendance: 17,137; Referee: David Coote

1 January 2023 17	Tottenham Hotspur	0–2	Aston Villa	Tottenham
14:00 GMT	Romero (yellow card) 28'; Lenglet (yellow card) 31'; Davies (yellow card) 37'; Bissouma (yellow card) 59'	Report	Buendía 50'; Mings (yellow card) 56'; Konsa (yellow card) 66'; Douglas Luiz 73'; Chambers (yellow card) 90+3'	Stadium: Tottenham Hotspur Stadium; Attendance: 61,651; Referee: John Brooks

4 January 2023 18	Crystal Palace	0–4	Tottenham Hotspur	Selhurst
20:00 GMT	Schlupp (yellow card) 61'	Report	Skipp (yellow card) 42'; Kane 48', 53'; Doherty 68'; Son Heung-min 72'; Gil (yellow card) 77'	Stadium: Selhurst Park; Attendance: 25,132; Referee: Michael Oliver

15 January 2023 19	Tottenham Hotspur	0–2	Arsenal	Tottenham
16:30 GMT	Romero (yellow card) 35'; Sessegnon (yellow card) 45+1'; Sarr (yellow card) 53'; Lenglet (yellow card) 72'	Report	Lloris 14' (o.g.); Ødegaard 36'; Martinelli (yellow card) 70'; Gabriel (yellow card) 90+1'	Stadium: Tottenham Hotspur Stadium; Attendance: 61,870; Referee: Craig Pawson

19 January 2023 20	Manchester City	4–2	Tottenham Hotspur	Manchester
20:00 GMT	Mahrez (yellow card) 21', (goal) 63', 90'; Álvarez 51'; Haaland 53'	Report	Romero (yellow card) 23'; Højbjerg (yellow card) 31'; Kulusevski 44'; Emerson 45+2'	Stadium: City of Manchester Stadium; Attendance: 53,088; Referee: Simon Hooper
Note: The match was originally scheduled to be played on 11 September 2022, but was included in the league-wide postponement due to the death of Queen Elizabeth II.

23 January 2023 21	Fulham	0–1	Tottenham Hotspur	Fulham
20:15 GMT	Palhinha (yellow card) 17'	Report	Son Heung-min (yellow card) 28'; Kane 45+1'; Romero (yellow card) 70'; Bentancur (yellow card) 78'	Stadium: Craven Cottage; Attendance: 24,190; Referee: Paul Tierney

5 February 2023 22	Tottenham Hotspur	1–0	Manchester City	Tottenham
16:30 GMT	Kane 15'; Bentancur (yellow card) 23'; Romero (yellow card) 26' (yellow-red card) 87'; Perišić (yellow card) 75'	Report	Ederson (yellow card) 83'; Walker (yellow card) 90+7'	Stadium: Tottenham Hotspur Stadium; Attendance: 61,747; Referee: Andrew Madley

11 February 2023 23	Leicester City	4–1	Tottenham Hotspur	Leicester
15:00 GMT	Faes (yellow card) 12'; Mendy 23'; Maddison 25', (yellow card) 40'; Iheanacho 45+4'; Dewsbury-Hall (yellow card) 59'; Barnes (yellow card) 66', (goal) 81'; Souttar (yellow card) 74'	Report	Bentancur (yellow card) 4', (goal) 14'; Dier (yellow card) 55'	Stadium: King Power Stadium; Attendance: 32,184; Referee: Michael Salisbury

19 February 2023 24	Tottenham Hotspur	2–0	West Ham United	Tottenham
16:30 GMT	Skipp (yellow card) 9'; Emerson 56'; Son Heung-min 72'; Perišić (yellow card) 90+3'	Report	Antonio (yellow card) 62'	Stadium: Tottenham Hotspur Stadium; Attendance: 61,476; Referee: Michael Oliver

26 February 2023 25	Tottenham Hotspur	2–0	Chelsea	Tottenham
13:30 GMT	Emerson (yellow card) 45+3'; Skipp 46'; Davies (yellow card) 59'; Kane 82'	Report	Havertz (yellow card) 45+3'; Ziyech (yellow card) 45+6'; Mount (yellow card) 74'	Stadium: Tottenham Hotspur Stadium; Attendance: 61,613; Referee: Stuart Attwell

4 March 2023 26	Wolverhampton Wanderers	1–0	Tottenham Hotspur	Wolverhampton
15:00 GMT	Neves (yellow card) 45+4'; A. Traoré 82'	Report	Kulusevski (yellow card) 61'	Stadium: Molineux Stadium; Attendance: 31,585; Referee: Tim Robinson

11 March 2023 27	Tottenham Hotspur	3–1	Nottingham Forest	Tottenham
15:00 GMT	Kane 19', 35' (pen.); Son Heung-min 62'; Skipp (yellow card) 69'; Dier (yellow card) 71'; Højbjerg (yellow card) 90+1'	Report	Lodi (yellow card) 55'; Worrall 81'; Ayew (penalty missed) 90+6'	Stadium: Tottenham Hotspur Stadium; Attendance: 61,460; Referee: Craig Pawson

18 March 2023 28	Southampton	3–3	Tottenham Hotspur	Southampton
15:00 GMT	Adams 46'; Walcott 77'; Sulemana (yellow card) 87'; Ward-Prowse 90+3' (pen.)	Report	Porro 45+1'; Kane 65'; Perišić 74'; Skipp (yellow card) 85'	Stadium: St Mary's Stadium; Attendance: 30,157; Referee: Simon Hooper

3 April 2023 29	Everton	1–1	Tottenham Hotspur	Walton
20:00 BST	Doucouré (red card) 58'; Keane 90'	Report	Kane (yellow card) 60', (goal) 68' (pen.); Lenglet (yellow card) 64'; Romero (yellow card) 79'; Lucas (red card) 88'	Stadium: Goodison Park; Attendance: 39,294; Referee: David Coote

8 April 2023 30	Tottenham Hotspur	2–1	Brighton & Hove Albion	Tottenham
15:00 BST	Son Heung-min 10'; Perišić (yellow card) 67'; Kane 79'; Højbjerg (yellow card) 87'; Romero (yellow card) 90+1'	Report	Dunk 34'; Groß (yellow card) 64'	Stadium: Tottenham Hotspur Stadium; Attendance: 61,405; Referee: Stuart Attwell

15 April 2023 31	Tottenham Hotspur	2–3	Bournemouth	Tottenham
15:15 BST	Son Heung-min 14'; Perišić (yellow card) 58'; Danjuma 88'	Report	Viña 38'; Christie (yellow card) 45'; Stephens (yellow card) 45+2'; Solanke 51'; Rothwell (yellow card) 90+2'; Ouattara 90+5'	Stadium: Tottenham Hotspur Stadium; Attendance: 61,369; Referee: Andrew Madley
Note: The match was originally scheduled to be played at 15:00 BST, but was delayed by 15 minutes due to Bournemouth arriving late because of traffic.

23 April 2023 32	Newcastle United	6–1	Tottenham Hotspur	Newcastle upon Tyne
14:00 BST	Murphy 2', 9'; Joelinton 6'; Isak 19', 21'; Wilson 67'	Report	Kulusevski (yellow card) 28'; Skipp (yellow card) 34'; Kane 49'; Romero (yellow card) 74'	Stadium: St James' Park; Attendance: 52,252; Referee: David Coote

27 April 2023 33	Tottenham Hotspur	2–2	Manchester United	Tottenham
20:15 BST	Højbjerg (yellow card) 41'; Porro 56'; Son Heung-min 79'	Report	Sancho 7'; Wan-Bissaka (yellow card) 43'; Rashford 44'; Lindelöf (yellow card) 59'	Stadium: Tottenham Hotspur Stadium; Attendance: 61,586; Referee: Anthony Taylor

30 April 2023 34	Liverpool	4–3	Tottenham Hotspur	Liverpool
16:30 BST	Jones 3'; Díaz 5'; Salah 15' (pen.); Konaté (yellow card) 70'; Jota (yellow card) 81', (goal) 90+4'; Milner (yellow card) 90+1'	Report	Kane 40'; Son Heung-min (yellow card) 52', (goal) 77'; Richarlison 90+3', (yellow card) 90+3'	Stadium: Anfield; Attendance: 53,275; Referee: Paul Tierney

6 May 2023 35	Tottenham Hotspur	1–0	Crystal Palace	Tottenham
15:00 BST	Kane 45+1'; Davies (yellow card) 83'; Lenglet (yellow card) 86'; Forster (yellow card) 90+1'	Report	Schlupp (yellow card) 56'; Ward (yellow card) 69'; Ayew (yellow card) 73'; Zaha (yellow card) 90+1'; Andersen (yellow card) 90+2'	Stadium: Tottenham Hotspur Stadium; Attendance: 61,093; Referee: Darren England

13 May 2023 36	Aston Villa	2–1	Tottenham Hotspur	Birmingham
15:00 BST	Ramsey 8'; McGinn (yellow card) 23'; Douglas Luiz 72'; Young (yellow card) 89'; Watkins (yellow card) 90+1'	Report	Skipp (yellow card) 53'; Kane (yellow card) 73', (goal) 90' (pen.); Romero (yellow card) 80'	Stadium: Villa Park; Attendance: 42,164; Referee: Peter Bankes

20 May 2023 37	Tottenham Hotspur	1–3	Brentford	Tottenham
12:30 BST	Kane 8'; Bissouma (yellow card) 45'	Report	Mbeumo 50', 62'; Henry (yellow card) 68'; Wissa 88'	Stadium: Tottenham Hotspur Stadium; Attendance: 61,514; Referee: Jarred Gillett

28 May 2023 38	Leeds United	1–4	Tottenham Hotspur	Leeds
16:30 BST	Struijk (yellow card) 9'; Wöber (yellow card) 14'; Cooper (yellow card) 57'; Harrison 67'	Report	Kane 2', 69'; Porro 47'; Lucas 90+5'	Stadium: Elland Road; Attendance: 36,871; Referee: Anthony Taylor

=== FA Cup ===
Tottenham entered the FA Cup in the third round and were drawn at home to Portsmouth. They were then drawn away to Preston North End in the fourth round, and away to Sheffield United in the fifth round.

7 January 2023 Third round	Tottenham Hotspur	1–0	Portsmouth	Tottenham
12:30 GMT	Kane 50'; Davies (yellow card) 90'	Report	Thompson (yellow card) 77'	Stadium: Tottenham Hotspur Stadium; Attendance: 60,161; Referee: Thomas Bramall

28 January 2023 Fourth round	Preston North End	0–3	Tottenham Hotspur	Preston
18:00 GMT	Cannon (yellow card) 61'	Report	Son Heung-min 50', 69'; Danjuma 87'	Stadium: Deepdale; Attendance: 21,219; Referee: Peter Bankes

1 March 2023 Fifth round	Sheffield United	1–0	Tottenham Hotspur	Sheffield
19:55 GMT	Baldock (yellow card) 47'; Ndiaye 79'; Lowe (yellow card) 85'	Report	Sarr (yellow card) 56'	Stadium: Bramall Lane; Attendance: 28,308; Referee: John Brooks

=== EFL Cup ===
Tottenham entered the competition in the third round as one of the teams competing in UEFA competitions. They were drawn away to Nottingham Forest in the third round.

9 November 2022 Third round	Nottingham Forest	2–0	Tottenham Hotspur	West Bridgford
19:45 GMT	Lodi 50'; Lingard 57', (yellow card) 64'; Mangala (yellow card) 68' (yellow-red card) 75'	Report	Bissouma (yellow card) 67'; Kulusevski (yellow card) 87'; Bentancur (yellow card) 88'; Dier (yellow card) 90+4'	Stadium: City Ground; Attendance: 28,384; Referee: Peter Bankes

=== UEFA Champions League ===
==== Group stage ====
The draw for the group stage was held on 25 August 2022.

Pos	Team	Pld	W	D	L	GF	GA	GD	Pts	Qualification	TOT	FRA	SPO	MAR
1	(England) Tottenham Hotspur	6	3	2	1	8	6	+2	11	Advance to knockout phase	—	3–2	1–1	2–0
2	(Germany) Eintracht Frankfurt	6	3	1	2	7	8	−1	10	Advance to knockout phase	0–0	—	0–3	2–1
3	(Portugal) Sporting CP	6	2	1	3	8	9	−1	7	Transfer to Europa League	2–0	1–2	—	0–2
4	(France) Marseille	6	2	0	4	8	8	0	6		1–2	0–1	4–1	—

Source: UEFA
Rules for classification: Group stage tiebreakers

7 September 2022 1	Tottenham Hotspur (England)	2–0	(France) Marseille	London, England
20:00 BST	Dier (yellow card) 53'; Son Heung-min (yellow card) 65'; Richarlison 76', 81'	Report	Mbemba (red card) 48'; Bailly (yellow card) 48'; Clauss (yellow card) 72'	Stadium: Tottenham Hotspur Stadium; Attendance: 57,367; Referee: Slavko Vinčić (Slovenia)

13 September 2022 2	Sporting CP (Portugal)	2–0	(England) Tottenham Hotspur	Lisbon, Portugal
17:45 WEST	Morita (yellow card) 63'; Matheus Reis (yellow card) 75'; Paulinho 90'; Arthur 90+3'	Report	Bentancur (yellow card) 61'; Emerson (yellow card) 81'; Højbjerg (yellow card) 84'	Stadium: Estádio José Alvalade; Attendance: 39,899; Referee: Srđan Jovanović (Serbia)

4 October 2022 3	Eintracht Frankfurt (Germany)	0–0	(England) Tottenham Hotspur	Frankfurt, Germany
21:00 CEST		Report	Højbjerg (yellow card) 44'; Lenglet (yellow card) 74'; Kane (yellow card) 84'	Stadium: Waldstadion; Attendance: 50,500; Referee: Daniele Orsato (Italy)

12 October 2022 4	Tottenham Hotspur (England)	3–2	(Germany) Eintracht Frankfurt	London, England
20:00 BST	Dier (yellow card) 12'; Son Heung-min 20', 36'; Kane 28' (pen.), (penalty missed) 90+2'; Bentancur (yellow card) 40'; Sessegnon (yellow card) 84'	Report	Kamada 14'; Tuta (yellow card) 57' (yellow-red card) 60'; Hasebe (yellow card) 61'; Alidou 87'; Smolčić (yellow card) 90+1'	Stadium: Tottenham Hotspur Stadium; Attendance: 55,180; Referee: Carlos del Cerro Grande (Spain)

26 October 2022 5	Tottenham Hotspur (England)	1–1	(Portugal) Sporting CP	London, England
20:00 BST	Romero (yellow card) 67'; Bentancur 80'	Report	Edwards 22'; Coates (yellow card) 41'; Ugarte (yellow card) 83'	Stadium: Tottenham Hotspur Stadium; Attendance: 59,588; Referee: Danny Makkelie (Netherlands)

1 November 2022 6	Marseille (France)	1–2	(England) Tottenham Hotspur	Marseille, France
21:00 CEST	Mbemba 45+2'; Balerdi (yellow card) 76'	Report	Lenglet 54', (yellow card) 57'; Højbjerg (yellow card) 90+1', (goal) 90+5'	Stadium: Stade Vélodrome; Attendance: 50,768; Referee: Szymon Marciniak (Poland)

==== Knockout phase ====
===== Round of 16 =====
The draw for the round of 16 was held on 7 November 2022, with Tottenham being drawn against Milan.

14 February 2023 First leg	Milan (Italy)	1–0	(England) Tottenham Hotspur	Milan, Italy
21:00 CET	Brahim 7'; Tonali (yellow card) 80'; Hernandez (yellow card) 90+2'	Report	Romero (yellow card) 48'; Dier (yellow card) 63'	Stadium: San Siro; Attendance: 74,320; Referee: Sandro Schärer (Switzerland)

8 March 2023 Second leg	Tottenham Hotspur (England)	0–0 (0–1 agg.)	(Italy) Milan	London, England
20:10 GMT	Romero (yellow card) 17' (yellow-red card) 77'; Lenglet (yellow card) 21'; Skipp (yellow card) 90+5'	Report	Thiaw (yellow card) 90+3'	Stadium: Tottenham Hotspur Stadium; Attendance: 61,602; Referee: Clément Turpin (France)
Note: The match was originally scheduled to be played at 20:00 GMT, but was delayed by 10 minutes due to the late arrival of both team buses.

== Statistics ==
=== Appearances ===
No.	Pos.	Player	Premier League		FA Cup		EFL Cup		UEFA Champions League		Total	
No.	Pos.	Player	Apps	Goals	Apps	Goals	Apps	Goals	Apps	Goals	Apps	Goals
Goalkeepers
1	GK	(France) Hugo Lloris	25	0	0	0	0	0	6	0	31	0
20	GK	(England) Fraser Forster	13+1	0	3	0	1	0	2	0	19+1	0
Defenders
6	DF	(Colombia) Davinson Sánchez	8+10	0	3	0	1	0	0+2	0	12+12	0
12	DF	(Brazil) Emerson Royal	20+6	2	1+1	0	0	0	6+2	0	27+9	2
15	DF	(England) Eric Dier	31+2	2	1	0	1	0	7	0	40+2	2
17	DF	(Argentina) Cristian Romero	26+1	0	0	0	0	0	7	0	33+1	0
19	DF	(England) Ryan Sessegnon	9+8	2	2	0	1	0	2+1	0	14+9	2
23	DF	(Spain) Pedro Porro	13+2	3	1	0	0	0	0+1	0	14+3	3
24	DF	(England) Djed Spence	0+4	0	0+1	0	0+1	0	0	0	0+6	0
25	DF	(England) Japhet Tanganga	2+2	0	2	0	0	0	0+1	0	4+3	0
33	DF	(Wales) Ben Davies	26+5	2	2	0	0	0	4+3	0	32+8	2
34	DF	(France) Clément Lenglet	24+2	0	1	0	1	0	6+1	1	32+3	1
77	DF	(England) George Abbott	0+1	0	0	0	0	0	0	0	0+1	0
Midfielders
4	MF	(England) Oliver Skipp	18+5	1	1+2	0	1	0	2+2	0	22+9	1
5	MF	(Denmark) Pierre-Emile Højbjerg	35	4	1	0	1	0	7	1	44	5
14	MF	(Croatia) Ivan Perišić	23+11	1	2	0	1	0	7	0	33+11	1
29	MF	(Senegal) Pape Matar Sarr	2+9	0	2	0	0	0	1	0	5+9	0
30	MF	(Uruguay) Rodrigo Bentancur	17+1	5	1	0	0+1	0	6	1	24+2	6
38	MF	(Mali) Yves Bissouma	10+13	0	1	0	1	0	0+3	0	12+16	0
42	MF	(England) Harvey White	0+1	0	0	0	0	0	0	0	0+1	0
45	MF	(England) Alfie Devine	0	0	0+1	0	0	0	0	0	0+1	0
51	MF	(Scotland) Matthew Craig	0+1	0	0	0	0	0	0	0	0+1	0
Forwards
7	FW	(South Korea) Son Heung-min	33+3	10	3	2	0	0	8	2	44+3	14
9	FW	(Brazil) Richarlison	12+15	1	1	0	0+1	0	4+2	2	17+18	3
10	FW	(England) Harry Kane	38	30	1+1	1	1	0	8	1	48+1	32
11	FW	(Spain) Bryan Gil	2+2	0	1+1	0	0+1	0	0+4	0	3+8	0
16	FW	(Netherlands) Arnaut Danjuma	1+8	1	0+2	1	0	0	0+1	0	1+11	2
21	FW	(Sweden) Dejan Kulusevski	23+7	2	1+1	0	0+1	0	2+2	0	26+11	2
27	FW	(Brazil) Lucas Moura	0+15	1	1	0	0	0	2+1	0	3+16	1
Players transferred out during the season
2	DF	(Republic of Ireland) Matt Doherty	7+5	1	1	0	1	0	1+1	0	10+6	1

Source: Premier League, Champions League

=== Goalscorers ===
The list is sorted by shirt number when total goals are equal.

Rnk	Pos	No.	Player	Premier League	FA Cup	EFL Cup	UEFA Champions League	Total
1	FW	10	(England) Harry Kane	30	1	0	1	32
2	FW	7	(South Korea) Son Heung-min	10	2	0	2	14
3	MF	30	(Uruguay) Rodrigo Bentancur	5	0	0	1	6
4	MF	5	(Denmark) Pierre-Emile Højbjerg	4	0	0	1	5
5	FW	9	(Brazil) Richarlison	1	0	0	2	3
5	DF	23	(Spain) Pedro Porro	3	0	0	0	3
7	DF	12	(Brazil) Emerson Royal	2	0	0	0	2
7	DF	15	(England) Eric Dier	2	0	0	0	2
7	FW	16	(Netherlands) Arnaut Danjuma	1	1	0	0	2
7	DF	19	(England) Ryan Sessegnon	2	0	0	0	2
7	FW	21	(Sweden) Dejan Kulusevski	2	0	0	0	2
7	DF	33	(Wales) Ben Davies	2	0	0	0	2
13	DF	2	(Republic of Ireland) Matt Doherty	1	0	0	0	1
13	MF	4	(England) Oliver Skipp	1	0	0	0	1
13	MF	14	(Croatia) Ivan Perišić	1	0	0	0	1
13	FW	27	(Brazil) Lucas Moura	1	0	0	0	1
13	DF	34	(France) Clément Lenglet	0	0	0	1	1
Total				68	4	0	8	80

Source: Premier League

==== Hat-tricks ====
Key
Score	The score is at the time of the goals. Tottenham's score is listed first.		
(H)	Tottenham was the home team.	(A)	Tottenham was the away team.

Pos.	Nat.	Player	Minutes	Score	Result	Opponent	Competition	Date
FW	(South Korea)	Son Heung-min	73', 84', 86'	4–2, 5–2, 6–2	6–2 (H)	Leicester City	Premier League	17 September 2022

==== Own goals ====
Key
Score	The score is at the time of the own goal. Tottenham's score is listed first.		
(H)	Tottenham was the home team.	(A)	Tottenham was the away team.

Pos.	Nat.	Player	Minute	Score	Result	Opponent	Competition	Date
GK	(France)	Hugo Lloris	14'	0–1	0–2 (H)	Arsenal	Premier League	15 January 2023

=== Disciplinary ===
The list is sorted by shirt number when total cards are equal.

Rnk	Pos	No.	Name	Premier League			FA Cup			EFL Cup			UEFA Champions League			Total		
Rnk	Pos	No.	Name	Yellow card	Second yellow card	Red card	Yellow card	Second yellow card	Red card	Yellow card	Second yellow card	Red card	Yellow card	Second yellow card	Red card	Yellow card	Second yellow card	Red card
1	DF	17	(Argentina) Cristian Romero	8	1	0	0	0	0	0	0	0	2	1	0	10	2	0
2	MF	30	(Uruguay) Rodrigo Bentancur	8	0	0	0	0	0	1	0	0	2	0	0	11	0	0
3	MF	4	(England) Oliver Skipp	7	0	0	0	0	0	0	0	0	1	0	0	8	0	0
3	MF	5	(Denmark) Pierre-Emile Højbjerg	5	0	0	0	0	0	0	0	0	3	0	0	8	0	0
5	FW	10	(England) Harry Kane	6	0	0	0	0	0	0	0	0	1	0	0	7	0	0
5	DF	15	(England) Eric Dier	4	0	0	0	0	0	1	0	0	2	0	0	7	0	0
5	DF	34	(France) Clément Lenglet	4	0	0	0	0	0	0	0	0	3	0	0	7	0	0
5	MF	38	(Mali) Yves Bissouma	6	0	0	0	0	0	1	0	0	0	0	0	7	0	0
9	MF	14	(Croatia) Ivan Perišić	6	0	0	0	0	0	0	0	0	0	0	0	6	0	0
10	DF	12	(Brazil) Emerson Royal	2	0	1	0	0	0	0	0	0	1	0	0	3	0	1
10	DF	19	(England) Ryan Sessegnon	4	0	0	0	0	0	0	0	0	1	0	0	5	0	0
10	DF	33	(Wales) Ben Davies	4	0	0	1	0	0	0	0	0	0	0	0	5	0	0
13	FW	7	(South Korea) Son Heung-min	2	0	0	0	0	0	0	0	0	1	0	0	3	0	0
13	FW	9	(Brazil) Richarlison	3	0	0	0	0	0	0	0	0	0	0	0	3	0	0
13	FW	21	(Sweden) Dejan Kulusevski	2	0	0	0	0	0	1	0	0	0	0	0	3	0	0
16	FW	27	(Brazil) Lucas Moura	0	0	1	0	0	0	0	0	0	0	0	0	0	0	1
16	MF	29	(Senegal) Pape Matar Sarr	2	0	0	0	0	0	0	0	0	0	0	0	2	0	0
18	DF	6	(Colombia) Davinson Sánchez	1	0	0	0	0	0	0	0	0	0	0	0	1	0	0
18	FW	11	(Spain) Bryan Gil	1	0	0	0	0	0	0	0	0	0	0	0	1	0	0
18	GK	20	(England) Fraser Forster	1	0	0	0	0	0	0	0	0	0	0	0	1	0	0
Total				73	1	2	2	0	0	4	0	0	18	1	0	97	2	2

Source: Premier League

=== Clean sheets ===
The list is sorted by shirt number when total clean sheets are equal.

Rnk	No.	Player	Premier League	FA Cup	EFL Cup	UEFA Champions League	Total
1	1	(France) Hugo Lloris	7	0	0	2	9
2	20	(England) Fraser Forster	3	2	0	1	6
Total			10	2	0	3	15

Source: Premier League

== Awards and nominations ==
=== Premier League ===
==== Player of the Season ====
Season	Pos.	Nat.	Player	Result	Ref.
2022–23	FW	(England)	Harry Kane	Nominated	

==== Manager of the Month ====
Month	Nat.	Manager	M	W	D	L	GF	GA	GD	Pts	Pos	Result	Ref.
August	(Italy)	Antonio Conte	5	3	2	0	10	4	+6	11	3rd	Nominated	
September	(Italy)	Antonio Conte	2	2	0	0	8	3	+5	6	3rd	Nominated	
February	(Italy)	Antonio Conte	4	3	0	1	6	4	+2	9	4th	Nominated	

==== Player of the Month ====
Month	Pos.	Nat.	Player	Result	Ref.
September	MF	(Denmark)	Pierre-Emile Højbjerg	Nominated	
February	DF	(Brazil)	Emerson Royal	Nominated	

==== Goal of the Month ====
Key
Score	The score is at the time of the goal. Tottenham's score is listed first.		
(H)	Tottenham was the home team.	(A)	Tottenham was the away team.

Month	Pos.	Nat.	Player	Score	Final score	Opponent	Date	Result	Ref.
September	FW	(South Korea)	Son Heung-min	4–2	6–2 (H)	Leicester City	17 September 2022	Nominated	
September	FW	(South Korea)	Son Heung-min	5–2	6–2 (H)	Leicester City	17 September 2022	Nominated	
January	FW	(England)	Harry Kane	1–0	1–0 (A)	Fulham	23 January 2023	Nominated	
February	MF	(England)	Oliver Skipp	1–0	1–0 (H)	Chelsea	26 February 2023	Nominated	
April	FW	(South Korea)	Son Heung-min	1–0	2–1 (H)	Brighton & Hove Albion	8 April 2023	Nominated	

==== Save of the Month ====
Month	Nat.	Player	Opponent	Date	Result	Ref.
August	(France)	Hugo Lloris	Chelsea	14 August 2022	Nominated	
September	(France)	Hugo Lloris	Fulham	3 September 2022	Nominated	
October	(France)	Hugo Lloris	Manchester United	19 October 2022	Nominated	
March	(England)	Fraser Forster	Nottingham Forest	11 March 2023	Nominated	

=== PFA ===
==== Premier League Fans' Player of the Month ====
Month	Pos.	Nat.	Player	Result	Ref.
September	FW	(England)	Harry Kane	Nominated	

==== Premier League Fans' Player of the Year ====
Year	Pos.	Nat.	Player	Result	Ref.
2022–23	FW	(England)	Harry Kane	Nominated	

== See also ==
- 2022–23 in English football
- List of Tottenham Hotspur F.C. seasons
