= 2014–15 Tottenham Hotspur F.C. season =

English football club season

Tottenham Hotspur
2014–15 season
- Owner: ENIC International Ltd.
- Chairman: Daniel Levy
- Manager: Mauricio Pochettino
- Stadium: White Hart Lane
- Premier League: 5th
- FA Cup: Fourth round
- League Cup: Runners-up
- UEFA Europa League: Round of 32
- Top goalscorer: League: Harry Kane (21); All: Harry Kane (31)
Home colours	Away colours	Third colours

The 2014–15 season was Tottenham Hotspur's 23rd in the Premier League and their 37th successive season in the top division of the English football league system.

The campaign represented Tottenham's 13th appearance in the UEFA Europa League, entering the Play-off round due to the result of the 2014 FA Cup Final, as a result of finishing sixth in the 2013–14 Premier League season.

== First-team squad ==
Squad no.	Name	Nationality	Position(s)	Date of birth (age)
Goalkeepers
1	Hugo Lloris	(France)	GK	26 December 1986 (aged 28)
13	Michel Vorm	(Netherlands)	GK	20 October 1983 (aged 31)
24	Brad Friedel	(United States)	GK	18 May 1971 (aged 44)
Defenders
2	Kyle Walker	(England)	RB	28 May 1990 (aged 24)
3	Danny Rose	(England)	LB	2 July 1990 (aged 24)
4	Younès Kaboul	(France)	CB	4 January 1986 (aged 29)
5	Jan Vertonghen	(Belgium)	CB / LB	24 April 1987 (aged 28)
6	Vlad Chiricheș	(Romania)	CB	14 November 1989 (aged 25)
12	DeAndre Yedlin	(United States)	RB	9 July 1993 (aged 21)
15	Eric Dier	(England)	CB / RB / DM	15 January 1994 (aged 21)
21	Federico Fazio	(Argentina)	CB	17 March 1987 (aged 28)
33	Ben Davies	(Wales)	LB	24 April 1993 (aged 22)
Midfielders
8	Paulinho	(Brazil)	CM / AM	25 July 1988 (aged 26)
11	Erik Lamela	(Argentina)	RW / LW	4 March 1992 (aged 23)
17	Andros Townsend	(England)	RW / LW	16 July 1991 (aged 23)
19	Mousa Dembélé	(Belgium)	CM / DM	16 July 1987 (aged 27)
22	Nacer Chadli	(Belgium)	LW / AM	2 August 1989 (aged 25)
23	Christian Eriksen	(Denmark)	AM / LW	14 February 1992 (aged 23)
25	Benjamin Stambouli	(France)	DM	13 August 1990 (aged 24)
29	Étienne Capoue	(France)	DM	11 July 1988 (aged 26)
38	Ryan Mason	(England)	CM	13 June 1991 (aged 23)
42	Nabil Bentaleb	(Algeria)	CM / DM	24 November 1994 (aged 20)
44	Cristian Ceballos	(Spain)	AM	3 December 1992 (aged 22)
Forwards
9	Roberto Soldado	(Spain)	CF	27 May 1985 (aged 29)
10	Emmanuel Adebayor	(Togo)	CF	26 February 1984 (aged 31)
18	Harry Kane	(England)	CF / SS	28 July 1993 (aged 21)

== Transfers ==
=== In ===
Position	Player	Transferred from	Fee	Transfer window	Date	Source
DF	(Wales) Ben Davies	(Wales) Swansea City	P/Ex	Summer	23 July 2014	
GK	(Netherlands) Michel Vorm	(Wales) Swansea City	£3,500,000	Summer	23 July 2014	
DF	(England) Eric Dier	(Portugal) Sporting CP	£4,000,000	Summer	2 August 2014	
DF	(United States) DeAndre Yedlin	(United States) Seattle Sounders	£2,500,000	Summer	13 August 2014	
DF	(Argentina) Federico Fazio	(Spain) Sevilla	£8,000,000	Summer	27 August 2014	
MF	(France) Benjamin Stambouli	(France) Montpellier	£4,700,000	Summer	1 September 2014	
MF	(England) Dele Alli	(England) Milton Keynes Dons	£5,000,000	Winter	2 February 2015	

Total spending: ▼£27,700,000

=== Out ===
Position	Player	Transfer	Transferred to	Fee	Transfer window	Date	Source
GK	(Brazil) Heurelho Gomes	Released	(England) Watford	N/A	Summer	30 June 2014	
GK	(Chile) Lawrence Vigouroux	Released	(England) Liverpool	N/A	Summer	30 June 2014	
FW	(England) Cameron Lancaster	Released	(England) Stevenage	N/A	Summer	30 June 2014	
DF	(England) Kevin Stewart	Released	(England) Liverpool	N/A	Summer	30 June 2014	
DF	(Republic of Ireland) Roman Michael-Percil	Released	(England) Concord Rangers	N/A	Summer	30 June 2014	
MF	(Australia) Giancarlo Gallifuoco	Released	(Wales) Swansea City	N/A	Summer	30 June 2014	
MF	(England) Jake Livermore	Sold	(England) Hull City	£8,000,000	Summer	21 June 2014	
MF	(Angola) Laste Dombaxe	Released	(England) Hadley	N/A	Summer	3 July 2014	
FW	(England) Darren McQueen	Released	(England) Ipswich Town	N/A	Summer	3 July 2014	
GK	(England) Liam Priestley	Released	(United States) Missouri State Bears	N/A	Summer	3 July 2014	
FW	(England) Kane Vincent-Young	Released	(England) Colchester United	N/A	Summer	3 July 2014	
MF	(Iceland) Gylfi Sigurðsson	Sold	(Wales) Swansea City	P/Ex	Summer	23 July 2014	
MF	(Spain) Iago Falque	Sold	(Italy) Genoa	£4,000,000	Summer	1 August 2014	
DF	(England) Michael Dawson	Sold	(England) Hull City	£6,000,000	Summer	26 August 2014	
FW	(Ivory Coast) Souleymane Coulibaly	Sold	(Italy) Bari	£1,500,000	Summer	1 September 2014	
FW	(England) Jonathan Obika	Sold	(England) Swindon Town	£200,000	Summer	1 September 2014	
DF	(England) Zeki Fryers	Sold	(England) Crystal Palace	£3,000,000	Summer	1 September 2014	
MF	(Brazil) Sandro	Sold	(England) Queens Park Rangers	£10,000,000	Summer	1 September 2014	
DF	(England) Kyle Naughton	Sold	(Wales) Swansea City	£5,000,000	Winter	22 January 2015	
DF	(Cameroon) Benoît Assou-Ekotto	Released	(France) Saint-Étienne	N/A	Winter	2 February 2015	
MF	(Portugal) Rúben Lameiras	Sold	(Sweden) Åtvidaberg	Undisclosed	Winter	26 March 2015	

Total income: ▲£37,700,000+

=== Loan out ===
Position	Player	Loaned to	Start	End	Source
DF	(England) Grant Hall	(England) Birmingham City	6 June 2014	5 January 2015	
MF	(England) Alex Pritchard	(England) Brentford	17 July 2014	30 June 2015	
MF	(Republic of Ireland) Kenny McEvoy	(England) Peterborough United	24 July 2014	12 November 2014	
FW	(England) Shaq Coulthirst	(England) Southend United	4 August 2014	4 March 2015	
GK	(Scotland) Jordan Archer	(England) Northampton Town	5 August 2014	1 January 2015	
DF	(United States) DeAndre Yedlin	(United States) Seattle Sounders	13 August 2014	1 January 2015	
MF	(England) Tom Carroll	(Wales) Swansea City	22 August 2014	26 May 2015	
DF	(England) Ryan Fredericks	(England) Middlesbrough	28 August 2014	30 June 2015	
MF	(Croatia) Tomislav Gomelt	(Italy) Bari	1 September 2014	30 June 2015	
MF	(Germany) Lewis Holtby	(Germany) Hamburg	1 September 2014	30 June 2015	
DF	(Serbia) Miloš Veljković	(England) Middlesbrough	16 October 2014	17 January 2015	
DF	(England) Grant Hall	(England) Blackpool	8 January 2015	30 June 2015	
DF	(Serbia) Miloš Veljković	(England) Charlton Athletic	20 January 2015	30 June 2015	
DF	(England) Dominic Ball	(England) Cambridge United	22 January 2015	30 June 2015	
MF	(Republic of Ireland) Kenny McEvoy	(England) Colchester United	30 January 2015	16 March 2015	
FW	(England) Nathan Oduwa	(England) Luton Town	2 February 2015	30 June 2015	
GK	(Scotland) Jordan Archer	(England) Millwall	2 February 2015	30 June 2015	
FW	(England) Emmanuel Sonupe	(Scotland) St Mirren	2 February 2015	30 June 2015	
MF	(England) Aaron Lennon	(England) Everton	2 February 2015	30 June 2015	
MF	(England) Dele Alli	(England) Milton Keynes Dons	2 February 2015	30 June 2015	
FW	(England) Shaq Coulthirst	(England) York City	13 March 2015	30 June 2015	
MF	(England) Grant Ward	(England) Coventry City	13 March 2015	30 June 2015	
DF	(South Africa) Bongani Khumalo	(England) Colchester United	14 March 2015	30 June 2015	

=== Overall transfer activity ===
==== Expenditure ====
Summer: ▼£22,700,000

Winter: ▼£5,000,000

Total: ▼£27,700,000

==== Income ====
Summer: ▲£32,700,000

Winter: ▲£5,000,000

Total: ▲£37,700,000

==== Net total ====
Summer: ▲£10,000,000

Winter: £0

Total: ▲£10,000,000

== Friendlies ==
=== First Team ===
==== Pre-season ====
19 July 2014	Seattle Sounders	3–3	Tottenham Hotspur	Seattle
13:10 PTZ; 21:10 BST	Pineda (yellow card) 29', (goal) 33' (pen.); Alonso 49', (yellow card) 89'; Scott (yellow card) 70'; Bowen 78'	Report	Holtby 11'; Soldado 55' (pen.), (yellow card) 89'; Falque 82' (pen.); Ceballos (yellow card) 86'	Stadium: CenturyLink Field; Attendance: 56,385; Referee: Ted Unkel

23 July 2014	Toronto FC	2–3	Tottenham Hotspur	Toronto
19:10 EDT; 00:10 BST	Wiedeman 63'; Hamilton 71'	Report	Lamela 15', 39'; Townsend 84'	Stadium: BMO Field

26 July 2014	Chicago Fire	0–2	Tottenham Hotspur	Chicago
20:10 EDT; 01:10 BST	Hurtado (yellow card) 60'	Report	Kane 5'; Rose (yellow card) 46'; Naughton (yellow card) 82'; Lennon 83'; Capoue (yellow card) 88'	Stadium: Toyota Park; Attendance: 17,156; Referee: Andres Pfefferkorn

2 August 2014	Celtic	1–6	Tottenham Hotspur	Helsinki
16:30 EEST; 14:30 BST	Lindsay 44'; Ambrose (red card) 91'	Report	Kane 5'; Soldado 12'; Holtby 45'; Lamela 60'; Eriksen 84'; Adebayor 89' (pen.)	Stadium: Helsinki Olympic Stadium

9 August 2014	Tottenham Hotspur	2–1	Schalke 04	London
17:30 BST	Adebayor 28'; Soldado 65'	Report	Ayhan (yellow card) 55'; Boateng 80'	Stadium: White Hart Lane; Attendance: 34,730; Referee: Anthony Taylor

==== Postseason ====
27 May 2015	Malaysia League XI	1–2	Tottenham Hotspur	Selangor
13:45 BST	Thiago Junio 32'	Report	Kane 19', 43'; Lamela (yellow card) 45'; Onomah (yellow card) 76'	Stadium: Shah Alam Stadium; Referee: Mohd Amirul Izwan Bin Yaacob (Malaysia)

30 May 2015	Sydney FC	0–1	Tottenham Hotspur	Sydney
11:00 BST		Report	Kane 43'	Stadium: ANZ Stadium; Attendance: 71,549; Referee: Minhu Lee

== Competitions ==
=== Overview ===
Competition	Record							
Competition	P	W	D	L	GF	GA	GD	Win %
Premier League	38	19	7	12	58	53	+5	50.00
FA Cup	3	1	1	1	6	5	+1	33.33
League Cup	6	4	1	1	12	5	+7	66.67
Europa League	10	5	3	2	15	8	+7	50.00
Total	57	29	12	16	91	71	+20	50.88

Updated to match played 26 November 2015
Source: Competitions

=== Premier League ===
==== League table ====
Pos	Team	Pld	W	D	L	GF	GA	GD	Pts	Qualification or relegation
3	Arsenal	38	22	9	7	71	36	+35	75	Qualification for the Champions League group stage
4	Manchester United	38	20	10	8	62	37	+25	70	Qualification for the Champions League play-off round
5	Tottenham Hotspur	38	19	7	12	58	53	+5	64	Qualification for the Europa League group stage (Note: Since winners of the 2014–15 FA Cup, Arsenal, and winners of the 2014–15 Football League Cup, Chelsea, qualified for the Champions League based on league position, the spot awarded to the FA Cup winners (Europa League group stage) was passed to the sixth-placed team, Liverpool, and the spot awarded to the League Cup winners (Europa League third qualifying round) was passed to the seventh-placed team, Southampton, since those teams were the first teams in the table not already qualified for any European competition.)
6	Liverpool	38	18	8	12	52	48	+4	62	Qualification for the Europa League group stage
7	Southampton	38	18	6	14	54	33	+21	60	Qualification for the Europa League third qualifying round

Source: Barclays Premier League
Rules for classification: 1) Points; 2) Goal difference; 3) Goals scored; 4) Play-offs (only if needed to decide champion, teams for relegation or teams for UEFA competitions).

==== Results summary ====
Overall								Home						Away					
Pld	W	D	L	GF	GA	GD	Pts	W	D	L	GF	GA	GD	W	D	L	GF	GA	GD
38	19	7	12	58	53	+5	64	10	3	6	31	24	+7	9	4	6	27	29	−2

Last updated: 24 May 2015.
Source: Premier League

==== Results by matchday ====
Matchday	1	2	3	4	5	6	7	8	9	10	11	12	13	14	15	16	17	18	19	20	21	22	23	24	25	26	27	28	29	30	31	32	33	34	35	36	37	38
Ground	A	H	H	A	H	A	H	A	H	A	H	A	H	A	H	A	H	A	H	H	A	H	A	H	A	H	H	A	A	H	A	H	A	A	H	A	H	A
Result	W	W	L	D	L	D	W	L	L	W	L	W	W	L	D	W	W	W	D	W	L	W	W	W	L	D	W	W	L	W	D	L	W	D	L	L	W	W
Position	3	1	6	6	9	8	6	8	11	8	12	10	7	10	10	7	6	7	7	5	5	5	5	5	6	7	7	6	7	7	6	7	6	6	6	6	6	5

Updated to match(es) played on 24 May 2015. Source: Statto.com
A = Away; H = Home; W = Win; D = Draw; L = Loss

==== Matches ====
16 August 2014 1	West Ham United	0–1	Tottenham Hotspur	London
15:00 BST	Noble (penalty missed); Collins (yellow card) 54' (yellow-red card) 63'; Kouyaté (yellow card) 90+2'	Report	Naughton (red card) 29'; Dier 90+3'	Stadium: Boleyn Ground; Attendance: 34,977; Referee: Chris Foy

24 August 2014 2	Tottenham Hotspur	4–0	Queens Park Rangers	London
13:30 BST	Chadli 12', 37'; Dier 30'; Adebayor 65'	Report	Fer (yellow card) 64'	Stadium: White Hart Lane; Attendance: 36,109; Referee: Anthony Taylor

31 August 2014 3	Tottenham Hotspur	0–3	Liverpool	London
13:30 BST		Report	Sterling 8', (yellow card) 75'; Allen (yellow card) 26'; Manquillo (yellow card) 36'; Gerrard 49' (pen.); Moreno 60', (yellow card) 90'	Stadium: White Hart Lane; Attendance: 36,130; Referee: Phil Dowd

13 September 2014 4	Sunderland	2–2	Tottenham Hotspur	Sunderland, Tyne and Wear
15:00 BST	Johnson 4'; Kane 82' (o.g.); Van Aanholt (yellow card) 85'; Vergini (yellow card) 89'; Wickham (yellow card) 90+1'; Brown (yellow card) 90+5'	Report	Chadli 2'; Eriksen 48'; Dier (yellow card) 61'	Stadium: Stadium of Light; Attendance: 40,799; Referee: Craig Pawson

21 September 2014 5	Tottenham Hotspur	0–1	West Bromwich Albion	London
13:30 BST	Rose (yellow card) 73'; Soldado (yellow card) 90'	Report	Morrison 74'; Sessègnon (yellow card) 83'; Foster (yellow card) 90+4'	Stadium: White Hart Lane; Attendance: 35,861; Referee: Kevin Friend

27 September 2014 6	Arsenal	1–1	Tottenham Hotspur	London
17:30 BST	Oxlade-Chamberlain (yellow card) 12', (goal) 74'; Wilshere (yellow card) 22'; Chambers (yellow card) 86'	Report	Lamela (yellow card) 27'; Chadli 56', (yellow card) 57'; Lennon (yellow card) 69'; Adebayor (yellow card) 69'; Mason (yellow card) 72'; Rose (yellow card) 83'	Stadium: Emirates Stadium; Attendance: 59,900; Referee: Michael Oliver

5 October 2014 7	Tottenham Hotspur	1–0	Southampton	London
14:05 BST	Eriksen 40'; Kaboul (yellow card) 53'; Lamela (yellow card) 66'	Report	Tadić (yellow card) 77'	Stadium: White Hart Lane; Attendance: 35,564; Referee: Mike Jones

18 October 2014 8	Manchester City	4–1	Tottenham Hotspur	Manchester
12:45 BST	Agüero 13', 20' (pen.), 68' (pen.), 75'; Navas (yellow card) 55'	Report	Eriksen 15'; Mason (yellow card) 33'; Dier (yellow card) 37'; Fazio (red card) 67'	Stadium: City of Manchester Stadium; Attendance: 45,549; Referee: Jonathan Moss

26 October 2014 9	Tottenham Hotspur	1–2	Newcastle United	London
13:30	Adebayor 18'; Capoue (yellow card) 63'; Rose (yellow card) 90'	Report	Gouffran (yellow card) 23'; Ameobi 46'; Colback (yellow card) 51'; Pérez 58'; Krul (yellow card) 87'	Stadium: White Hart Lane; Attendance: 35,650; Referee: Anthony Taylor

2 November 2014 10	Aston Villa	1–2	Tottenham Hotspur	Birmingham
16:00	Weimann 16'; Cissokho (yellow card) 38'; Benteke (red card) 65'; Sánchez (yellow card) 89'	BBC Report	Eriksen (yellow card) 25'; Vertonghen (yellow card) 61'; Chadli (yellow card) 80', (goal) 84'; Kane 90'	Stadium: Villa Park; Attendance: 32,049; Referee: Neil Swarbrick

9 November 2014 11	Tottenham Hotspur	1–2	Stoke City	London
13:30	Capoue (yellow card) 45+2'; Mason (yellow card) 69'; Kaboul (yellow card) 82'; Chadli 77'; Naughton (red card) 85'	Report	Bojan 6'; Cameron (yellow card) 22'; Begović (yellow card) 24'; Walters 33'	Stadium: White Hart Lane; Attendance: 35,699; Referee: Mike Jones

23 November 2014 12	Hull City	1–2	Tottenham Hotspur	Kingston upon Hull
16:00	Livermore 8', (yellow card) 62'; Ramírez (red card) 50'; Huddleston (yellow card) 63'; Robertson (yellow card) 90+2'	Report	Dier (yellow card) 33'; Kane 62'; Eriksen 90'	Stadium: KC Stadium; Attendance: 23,561; Referee: Craig Pawson

30 November 2014 13	Tottenham Hotspur	2–1	Everton	London
16:00	Eriksen 21', (yellow card) 90+2'; Soldado 45+1'; Chiricheș (yellow card) 56'; Lamela (yellow card) 87'; Davies (yellow card) 89'; Bentaleb (yellow card) 90'	Report	Mirallas 15', (yellow card) 43'	Stadium: White Hart Lane; Attendance: 35,901; Referee: Michael Oliver

3 December 2014 14	Chelsea	3–0	Tottenham Hotspur	London
19:45	Hazard 19'; Drogba 22'; Matić (yellow card) 50'; Rémy 73'	Report	Chiricheș (yellow card) 49'	Stadium: Stamford Bridge; Attendance: 41,518; Referee: Mike Dean

6 December 2014 15	Tottenham Hotspur	0–0	Crystal Palace	London
15:00	Eriksen (yellow card) 88'	Report		Stadium: White Hart Lane; Attendance: 35,860; Referee: Lee Mason

14 December 2014 16	Swansea City	1–2	Tottenham Hotspur	Swansea
16:00	Bony 48'; Ki (yellow card) 51'; Taylor (yellow card) 82'; Bartley (yellow card) 90+4'	Report	Kane 4'; Walker (yellow card) 15'; Vertonghen (yellow card) 35'; Mason (yellow card) 41'; Stambouli (yellow card) 53'; Eriksen 89'	Stadium: Liberty Stadium; Attendance: 20,650; Referee: Robert Madley

20 December 2014 17	Tottenham Hotspur	2–1	Burnley	London
15:00	Davies (yellow card) 3'; Kane 21'; Lamela 35'	Report	Barnes 27'	Stadium: White Hart Lane; Attendance: 35,681; Referee: Mike Jones

26 December 2014 18	Leicester City	1–2	Tottenham Hotspur	Leicester
15:00	Ulloa 48'; Vardy (yellow card) 90+3'	Report	Kane 1'; Walker (yellow card) 35'; Eriksen 71'; Vertonghen (yellow card) 82'	Stadium: King Power Stadium; Attendance: 31,870; Referee: Neil Swarbrick

28 December 2014 19	Tottenham Hotspur	0–0	Manchester United	London
12:00	Stambouli (yellow card) 26'; Townsend (yellow card) 27'	Report	Young (yellow card) 50'; McNair (yellow card) 71'; Falcao (yellow card) 84'; Rafael (yellow card) 86'	Stadium: White Hart Lane; Attendance: 35,711; Referee: Jonathan Moss

1 January 2015 20	Tottenham Hotspur	5–3	Chelsea	London
17:30	Kane 30', 52', (yellow card) 89'; Rose 44'; Townsend 45+4' (pen.); Bentaleb (yellow card) 66'; Paulinho (yellow card) 72'; Chadli 78'	Report	Costa 18'; Hazard 61'; Fàbregas (yellow card) 82'; Terry 87'	Stadium: White Hart Lane; Attendance: 35,903; Referee: Phil Dowd

10 January 2015 21	Crystal Palace	2–1	Tottenham Hotspur	London
17:30	Bannan (yellow card) 37'; Dann (yellow card) 45+1'; Gayle 69' (pen.); Puncheon (yellow card) 77', (goal) 80'; Campbell (yellow card) 90+2'; Guedioura (yellow card) 90+3'	Report	Townsend (yellow card) 25'; Kane 49'; Stambouli (yellow card) 55'; Fazio (yellow card) 90+2'	Stadium: Selhurst Park; Attendance: 24,193; Referee: Anthony Taylor

17 January 2015 22	Tottenham Hotspur	2–1	Sunderland	London
15:00	O’Shea 3' (o.g.); Vertonghen (yellow card) 30'; Eriksen 88'	Report	Larsson 31'; Rodwell (yellow card) 68'; Jones (yellow card) 87'	Stadium: White Hart Lane; Attendance: 35,973; Referee: Chris Foy

31 January 2015 23	West Bromwich Albion	0–3	Tottenham Hotspur	West Bromwich
15:00	Berahino (yellow card) 55'; Yacob (yellow card) 80'	Report	Eriksen 6'; Kane 15', 64' (pen.); Lamela (yellow card) 90+2'	Stadium: The Hawthorns; Attendance: 25,079; Referee: Kevin Friend

7 February 2015 24	Tottenham Hotspur	2–1	Arsenal	London
12:45	Kane (yellow card) 36', (goal) 56', 86'; Mason (yellow card) 79'; Bentaleb (yellow card) 90+2'	Report	Özil 11'; Monreal (yellow card) 43'; Welbeck (yellow card) 45+2'; Koscielny (yellow card) 53'; Giroud (yellow card) 84'; Ramsey (yellow card) 90+4'	Stadium: White Hart Lane; Attendance: 35,659; Referee: Martin Atkinson

10 February 2015 25	Liverpool	3–2	Tottenham Hotspur	Liverpool
20:00	Marković 15'; Škrtel (yellow card) 40'; Sakho (yellow card) 45'; Gerrard 53' (pen.), (yellow card) 60'; Balotelli 83'	Report	Mason (yellow card) 25'; Kane 26', (yellow card) 90+4'; Eriksen (yellow card) 28'; Dembélé 61', (yellow card) 63'; Walker (yellow card) 73'; Paulinho (yellow card) 88'	Stadium: Anfield; Attendance: 44,577; Referee: Phil Dowd

22 February 2015 26	Tottenham Hotspur	2–2	West Ham United	London
12:00 GMT	Rose 81'; Kane 90+6'	Report	Kouyaté 22'; Noble (yellow card) 45+1'; Cresswell (yellow card) 51'; Sakho 62'	Stadium: White Hart Lane; Attendance: 35,837; Referee: Jonathan Moss

4 March 2015 27	Tottenham Hotspur	3–2	Swansea City	London
19:45 GMT	Chadli 7'; Mason 51'; Townsend 60'; Dier (yellow card) 62'	Report	Ki 19'; Sigurðsson 89'	Stadium: White Hart Lane; Attendance: 34,008; Referee: Michael Oliver

7 March 2015 28	Queens Park Rangers	1–2	Tottenham Hotspur	London
15:00 GMT	Henry (yellow card) 60'; Sandro 75'	Report	Kane 34', 68'	Stadium: Loftus Road; Attendance: 17,992; Referee: Craig Pawson

15 March 2015 29	Manchester United	3–0	Tottenham Hotspur	Manchester
16:00 GMT	Fellaini 9'; Carrick 19'; Mata (yellow card) 32'; Rooney 34'	Report	Rose (yellow card) 72'	Stadium: Old Trafford; Attendance: 75,112; Referee: Mark Clattenburg

21 March 2015 30	Tottenham Hotspur	4–3	Leicester City	London
15:00 GMT	Kane 6', 13', 64' (pen.); Chadli (yellow card) 32'; Rose (yellow card) 78'; Schlupp 85' (o.g.)	Report	Vardy 38'; Nugent (yellow card) 48', (goal) 90'; Morgan 50'	Stadium: White Hart Lane; Attendance: 35,950; Referee: Mike Dean

5 April 2015 31	Burnley	0–0	Tottenham Hotspur	Burnley
13:30 BST	Trippier (yellow card) 68'; Mee (yellow card) 78'	Report		Stadium: Turf Moor; Attendance: 18,829; Referee: Martin Atkinson

11 April 2015 32	Tottenham Hotspur	0–1	Aston Villa	London
15:00 BST	Bentaleb (yellow card) 65'; Rose (yellow card) 81'; Lamela (yellow card) 90+6'	Report	Benteke 35', (yellow card) 81'; Sánchez (yellow card) 58' (yellow-red card) 90+4'; Richardson (yellow card) 90+7'	Stadium: White Hart Lane; Attendance: 35,687; Referee: Lee Probert

19 April 2015 33	Newcastle United	1–3	Tottenham Hotspur	Newcastle upon Tyne
16:00 BST	Colback (yellow card) 40', (goal) 46'; Cabella (yellow card) 63'	Report	Chadli 30'; Paulinho (yellow card) 42'; Lamela (yellow card) 45'; Ériksen 53'; Vertonghen (yellow card) 62'; Bentaleb (yellow card) 88'; Kane 90+1'	Stadium: St James' Park; Attendance: 47,427; Referee: Kevin Friend

25 April 2015 34	Southampton	2–2	Tottenham Hotspur	Southampton
12:45 BST	Pellè 29', 65'; Davis (yellow card) 66'	Report	Vertonghen (yellow card) 31'; Davies (yellow card) 34'; Lamela 43'; Chadli 70'; Fazio (yellow card) 90+6'	Stadium: St Mary's Stadium; Attendance: 31,622; Referee: Jonathan Moss

3 May 2015 35	Tottenham Hotspur	0–1	Manchester City	London
16:00 BST	Bentaleb (yellow card) 42'; Mason (yellow card) 45'; Kane (yellow card) 90+5'	Report	Agüero 29'; Milner (yellow card) 41'; Zabaleta (yellow card) 68'; Kolarov (yellow card) 74'; Silva (yellow card) 82'	Stadium: White Hart Lane; Attendance: 35,784; Referee: Andre Marriner

9 May 2015 36	Stoke City	3–0	Tottenham Hotspur	Stoke-on-Trent
15:00 BST	Adam 21'; Nzonzi 32'; Diouf 86'	Report	Chiricheș (yellow card) 16' (yellow-red card) 51'	Stadium: Britannia Stadium; Attendance: 27,104; Referee: Mark Clattenburg

16 May 2015 37	Tottenham Hotspur	2–0	Hull City	London
15:00 BST	Mason (yellow card) 42'; Chadli 54'; Bentaleb (yellow card) 57'; Rose (yellow card) 59', (goal) 61'	Report	Meyler (yellow card) 90+2'	Stadium: White Hart Lane; Attendance: 35,857; Referee: Anthony Taylor

24 May 2015 38	Everton	0–1	Tottenham Hotspur	Liverpool
15:00 BST	Jagielka (yellow card) 80'	Report	Kane 24'; Stambouli (yellow card) 79'; Mason (yellow card) 82'	Stadium: Goodison Park; Attendance: 39,365; Referee: Jonathan Moss

=== FA Cup ===
5 January 2015 3rd round	Burnley	1–1	Tottenham Hotspur	Burnley
19:45	Vokes 73'	Report	Stambouli (yellow card) 9'; Chadli 52'	Stadium: Turf Moor; Attendance: 9,348; Referee: Roger East

14 January 2015 3rd round	Tottenham Hotspur	4–2	Burnley	London
20:00	Paulinho 10'; Capoue 45+2'; Chiricheș 49', (yellow card) 70'; Rose 52'	Report	Sordel 3'; Wallace 8'; Arfield (yellow card) 45'; Keane (yellow card) 88'	Stadium: White Hart Lane; Attendance: 24,367; Referee: Craig Pawson

24 January 2015 4th round	Tottenham Hotspur	1–2	Leicester City	London
15:00	Townsend 19' (pen.)	Report	Moore (yellow card) 24'; Kramarić (yellow card) 40'; Wasilewski (yellow card) 44'; Ulloa (yellow card) 78' (goal) 82'; Schlupp 90'	Stadium: White Hart Lane; Attendance: 35,548; Referee: Robert Madley

=== League Cup ===
24 September 2014 3rd round	Tottenham Hotspur	3–1	Nottingham Forest	London
19:45	Mason 72'; Soldado 83'; Kane 90'	Report	Grant 61'	Stadium: White Hart Lane; Attendance: 31,912; Referee: Andre Marriner

29 October 2014 4th round	Tottenham Hotspur	2–0	Brighton & Hove Albion	London
20:00	Fazio (yellow card) 32'; Lamela 54'; Kane 74'	Report		Stadium: White Hart Lane; Attendance: 33,537; Referee: Mark Clattenburg

17 December 2014 5th round	Tottenham Hotspur	4–0	Newcastle United	London
19:45	Bentaleb 18'; Chadli 46'; Kane 65'; Soldado 70'	Report	Haïdara (yellow card) 61'	Stadium: White Hart Lane; Attendance: 34,677; Referee: Andre Marriner

21 January 2015 SF Leg 1	Tottenham Hotspur	1–0	Sheffield United	London
19:45	Adebayor (yellow card) 17'; Townsend 74' (pen.)	Report	McEveley (yellow card) 55'	Stadium: White Hart Lane; Attendance: 35,323; Referee: Neil Swarbrick

28 January 2015 SF Leg 2	Sheffield United	2–2 (2–3 agg.)	Tottenham Hotspur	Sheffield
19:45	Doyle (yellow card) 45'; Flynn (yellow card) 58'; Adams 77', 79'; Basham (yellow card) 90+4'	Report	Eriksen 28', 88'; Walker (yellow card) 37'; Mason (yellow card) 47'; Dembélé (yellow card) 55'	Stadium: Bramall Lane; Attendance: 30,236; Referee: Mike Dean

1 March 2015 Final	Chelsea	2–0	Tottenham Hotspur	London
16:00	Terry 45'; Walker 56' (o.g.); Willian (yellow card) 70'; Cahill (yellow card) 72'; Cuadrado (yellow card) 85'	Report	Dier (yellow card) 31'; Bentaleb (yellow card) 78'	Stadium: Wembley Stadium; Attendance: 89,207; Referee: Anthony Taylor

=== UEFA Europa League ===
==== Play-off round ====
21 August 2014 First leg	AEL Limassol (Cyprus)	1–2	(England) Tottenham Hotspur	Larnaca, Cyprus
19:00 EEST; 17:00 BST	Adrián 14'; Cadú (yellow card) 39'	Report	Holtby (yellow card) 36'; Soldado (yellow card) 58' (goal) 74'; Kane 80'; Davies (yellow card) 86'	Stadium: Antonis Papadopoulos Stadium; Referee: Manuel de Sousa (Portugal)

28 August 2014 Second leg	Tottenham Hotspur (England)	3–0 (5–1 agg.)	(Cyprus) AEL Limassol	London, England
19:45 BST	Kane 45'; Paulinho 49'; Townsend (yellow card) 45+3' (goal) 66' (pen.)	Report	Fegrouche (yellow card) 13'; Bebê (yellow card) 43'	Stadium: White Hart Lane; Attendance: 29,976; Referee: Miroslav Zelinka (Czech Republic)

==== Group stage ====
Pos	Team	Pld	W	D	L	GF	GA	GD	Pts	Qualification	BES	TOT	AT	PAR
1	(Turkey) Beşiktaş	6	3	3	0	11	5	+6	12	Advance to knockout phase	—	1–0	1–1	2–1
2	(England) Tottenham Hotspur	6	3	2	1	9	4	+5	11	Advance to knockout phase	1–1	—	5–1	1–0
3	(Greece) Asteras Tripolis	6	1	3	2	7	10	−3	6		2–2	1–2	—	2–0
4	(Serbia) Partizan	6	0	2	4	1	9	−8	2		0–4	0–0	0–0	—

Source: Soccerway
Rules for classification: Group stage tiebreakers

18 September 2014 1	Partizan (Serbia)	0–0	(England) Tottenham Hotspur	Partizan Stadium, Belgrade
17:00 BST	B. Ilić (yellow card) 55'; Luka (yellow card) 86'	Report	Townsend (yellow card) 34'; Davies (yellow card) 48'	Attendance: 21,000; Referee: Alon Yefet (Israel)

2 October 2014 2	Tottenham Hotspur (England)	1–1	(Turkey) Beşiktaş	White Hart Lane, London
20:05 BST	Davies (yellow card) 7'; Kane 27'; Bentaleb (yellow card) 48'; Fazio (yellow card) 50'; Chiricheș (yellow card) 89'	Report	Ba (yellow card) 6', (goal) 89' (pen.)	Attendance: 24,300; Referee: Manuel Gräfe (Germany)

23 October 2014 3	Tottenham Hotspur (England)	5–1	(Greece) Asteras Tripolis	White Hart Lane, London
20:05 BST	Kane 13', 74', 81'; Lamela 30', 66'; Lloris (red card) 87'	Report	Panteliadis (yellow card) 37'; Barrales 89'	Attendance: 21,428; Referee: Ivan Kružliak (Slovakia)

6 November 2014 4	Asteras Tripolis (Greece)	1–2	(England) Tottenham Hotspur	Theodoros Kolokotronis Stadium, Tripoli
17:00	Sankaré (yellow card) 36'; Barrales 90' (pen.)	Report	Townsend 36' (pen.); Kane 42'; Mason (yellow card) 83'; Fazio (red card) 89'	Attendance: 5,130; Referee: Javier Estrada Fernández (Spain)

27 November 2014 5	Tottenham Hotspur (England)	1–0	(Serbia) Partizan	White Hart Lane, London
20:05	Stambouli 49', (yellow card) 51'	Report	Grbić (yellow card) 72'; Ilić (yellow card) 86'	Attendance: 28,362; Referee: Yevhen Aranovskiy (Ukraine)

11 December 2014 6	Beşiktaş (Turkey)	1–0	(England) Tottenham Hotspur	Atatürk Olympic Stadium, Istanbul
18:00	Gülüm (yellow card) 21'; Tosun 59'	Report		Attendance: 19,511; Referee: Stefan Johannesson (Sweden)

==== Round of 32 ====
19 February 2015 First Leg	Tottenham Hotspur (England)	1–1	(Italy) Fiorentina	White Hart Lane, London
20:05	Soldado 6' (yellow card) 35'	Report	Rodríguez (yellow card) 4'; Basanta 36'; Savić (yellow card) 50'	Attendance: 34,235; Referee: Carlos Velasco Carballo (Spain)

26 February 2015 Second Leg	Fiorentina (Italy)	2–0 (3–1 agg.)	(England) Tottenham Hotspur	Stadio Artemio Franchi, Florence
18:00	Badelj (yellow card) 36'; Gómez 54'; Salah 71', (yellow card) 72'	Report	Davies (yellow card) 50'	Attendance: 29,886; Referee: Hüseyin Göçek (Turkey)

== Statistics ==
=== Appearances and goals ===
No.	Pos	Nat	Player	Total		Premier League		FA Cup		League Cup		Europa League	
No.	Pos	Nat	Player	Apps	Goals	Apps	Goals	Apps	Goals	Apps	Goals	Apps	Goals
Goalkeepers
1	GK	(France) FRA	Hugo Lloris	44	0	35	0	0	0	1	0	8	0
13	GK	(Netherlands) NED	Michel Vorm	14	0	3+1	0	3	0	5	0	2	0
Defenders
2	DF	(England) ENG	Kyle Walker	21	0	15	0	0	0	3	0	2+1	0
3	DF	(England) ENG	Danny Rose	34	4	27+1	3	2	1	2+1	0	1	0
4	DF	(France) FRA	Younès Kaboul	15	0	11	0	2	0	0	0	2	0
5	DF	(Belgium) BEL	Jan Vertonghen	47	0	31+1	0	2	0	6	0	7	0
6	DF	(Romania) ROU	Vlad Chiricheș	19	1	8+2	0	3	1	1	0	5	0
12	DF	(United States) USA	DeAndre Yedlin	1	0	0+1	0	0	0	0	0	0	0
21	DF	(Argentina) ARG	Federico Fazio	31	0	20	0	2	0	3	0	6	0
33	DF	(Wales) WAL	Ben Davies	29	0	9+5	0	2	0	4	0	9	0
Midfielders
8	MF	(Brazil) BRA	Paulinho	30	2	3+12	0	3	1	1+3	0	7+1	1
15	MF	(England) ENG	Eric Dier	36	2	25+3	2	0+1	0	3	0	4	0
17	MF	(England) ENG	Andros Townsend	35	6	10+7	2	2+1	1	5+1	1	8+1	2
19	MF	(Belgium) BEL	Mousa Dembélé	40	1	10+16	1	2	0	2+3	0	5+2	0
22	MF	(Belgium) BEL	Nacer Chadli	45	12	28+7	11	2	0	2+1	1	3+2	0
23	MF	(Denmark) DEN	Christian Eriksen	48	12	37+1	10	1+1	0	4	2	3+1	0
25	MF	(France) FRA	Benjamin Stambouli	25	1	4+8	0	2	0	5	0	6	1
29	MF	(France) FRA	Étienne Capoue	18	1	11+1	0	2	1	0+1	0	1+2	0
38	MF	(England) ENG	Ryan Mason	37	2	29+2	1	0	0	3+1	1	0+2	0
42	MF	(Algeria) ALG	Nabil Bentaleb	35	1	25+1	0	0	0	3	1	5+1	0
44	MF	(England) ENG	Harry Winks	1	0	0	0	0	0	0	0	0+1	0
47	MF	(England) ENG	Josh Onomah	1	0	0	0	0+1	0	0	0	0	0
Forwards
9	FW	(Spain) ESP	Roberto Soldado	32	3	7+17	1	3	0	2+3	2	0	0
10	FW	(Togo) TOG	Emmanuel Adebayor	15	2	9+4	2	0+1	0	1	0	0	0
11	FW	(Argentina) ARG	Erik Lamela	38	3	25+8	2	1	0	1+3	1	0	0
18	FW	(England) ENG	Harry Kane	42	24	28+6	21	0+2	0	5+1	3	0	0
Players transferred out during the season
7	MF	(England) ENG	Aaron Lennon	17	0	3+6	0	0	0	2	0	3+3	0
14	MF	(Germany) GER	Lewis Holtby	3	0	0+1	0	0	0	0	0	1+1	0
16	DF	(England) ENG	Kyle Naughton	11	0	5	0	0	0	2	0	4	0
30	MF	(Brazil) BRA	Sandro	1	0	0	0	0	0	0	0	1	0
41	DF	(Serbia) SRB	Miloš Veljković	1	0	0	0	0	0	0	0	0+1	0

=== Goalscorers ===
As of 25 May 2015

This includes all competitive matches. The list is sorted by squad number when total goals are equal.

Rank	Pos	No.	Nat	Name	Premier League	FA Cup	League Cup	Europa League	Total
1	FW	18	(England)	Harry Kane	21	0	3	7	31
2	MF	22	(Belgium)	Nacer Chadli	11	1	1	0	13
3	MF	23	(Denmark)	Christian Eriksen	10	0	2	0	12
4	MF	17	(England)	Andros Townsend	2	1	1	2	6
5	FW	9	(Spain)	Roberto Soldado	1	0	2	2	5
5	MF	11	(Argentina)	Erik Lamela	2	0	1	2	5
7	DF	3	(England)	Danny Rose	3	1	0	0	4
8	MF	8	(Brazil)	Paulinho	0	1	0	1	2
8	FW	10	(Togo)	Emmanuel Adebayor	2	0	0	0	2
8	DF	15	(England)	Eric Dier	2	0	0	0	2
8	MF	38	(England)	Ryan Mason	1	0	1	0	2
12	DF	6	(Romania)	Vlad Chiricheș	0	1	0	0	1
12	MF	19	(Belgium)	Mousa Dembélé	1	0	0	0	1
12	MF	25	(France)	Benjamin Stambouli	0	0	0	1	1
12	MF	29	(France)	Étienne Capoue	0	1	0	0	1
12	MF	42	(Algeria)	Nabil Bentaleb	0	0	1	0	1
TOTALS					56	6	12	15	89

Last updated: 9 May 2018.
Source: Tottenham Hotspur F.C.

=== Clean sheets ===
The list is sorted by squad number when total clean sheets are equal.

Rnk	No.	Player	Premier League	FA Cup	League Cup	Europa League	Total
1	1	(France) Hugo Lloris	8	0	0	3	11
2	13	(Netherlands) Michel Vorm	1	0	3	0	4

Last updated: 9 May 2018.
Source: Tottenham Hotspur F.C.
