= Daniel Levy (businessman) =

English businessman (born 1962)

Daniel Levy CBE
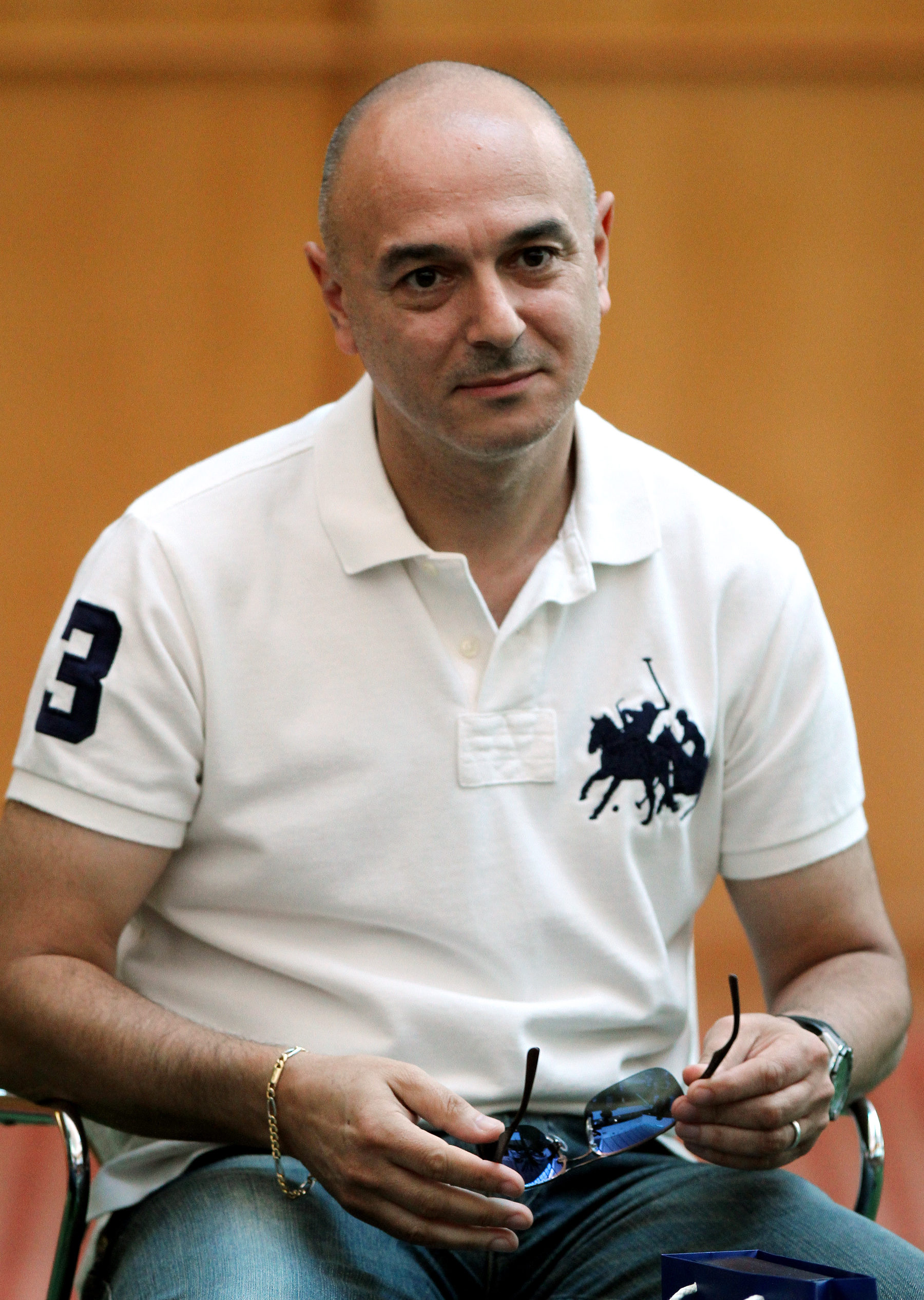
- Levy in 2012

Executive Chairman of Tottenham Hotspur Football Club
- In office February 2001 – September 2025
- Preceded by: Alan Sugar (sold his last stake of the club in 2007)
- Succeeded by: Peter Charrington (non-executive)

Personal details
- Born: Daniel Philip Levy; 8 February 1962 (age 64) Stepney, London, England
- Spouse: Tracy Dixon
- Children: 4
- Education: Sidney Sussex College, Cambridge
- Occupation: Businessman
- Known for: Managing Director of ENIC International Ltd; Member of Tavistock Group; Former executive chairman of Tottenham Hotspur

Daniel Philip Levy CBE (born 8 February 1962) is an English businessman, who served as the executive chairman of Premier League club Tottenham Hotspur from February 2001 until September 2025, becoming the league's longest-serving executive in that role.

Levy was closely involved in the financial management of the club, as well as the hiring of managers and transfers of players. He gained a reputation for financial prudence and a tough negotiation style. He oversaw the construction of Tottenham's new stadium, and helped Tottenham became one of the world's wealthiest football clubs during his tenure. He stepped down as the executive chairman following a restructuring of Tottenham's corporate structure in 2025. He and his family hold a 29.88% stake in the parent company of Tottenham Hotspur, ENIC, and Levy was said to have agreed to sell most of it in 2026.

== Early life ==
Daniel Philip Levy was born on 8 February 1962 in Stepney, London to Jewish parents. His father Barry Levy was the owner of a clothing retail business Mr Byrite (later rebranded as Blue Inc). He is a lifelong Tottenham Hotspur supporter, and attended his first match at White Hart Lane against Queens Park Rangers when he was seven or eight in the 1960s. He studied Economics and Land Economy at Sidney Sussex College, Cambridge, and graduated in 1985 with a First Class Honours Degree.

== Career ==
After graduating, Levy was involved in several businesses, including his family business, Mr Byrite, and property development. He went into investment banking, investing in private equity, and raising money to invest in many different companies. He formed a business association with Joe Lewis in an investment trust called ENIC International Ltd and became its managing director in 1995. Levy turned ENIC into a sports, entertainment and media company. As of 2025, Levy and his family owned 29.88% of the share capital of ENIC, while Lewis owned 70.6%. In June 2026, it was reported that Levy had sold his 24.99% stake in the company, leaving him with 4.89%.

ENIC bought shares in six European clubs, including a minority stake in Tottenham Hotspur. ENIC held a significant stake in Scottish football club Rangers, and Levy was a director of the club until 2004. ENIC also held stakes in AEK Athens, Slavia Prague, FC Basel and Vicenza, as well as non-football companies such as Warner Bros Restaurants and a Cambridge software company, Autonomy. He bought a significant stake in Tottenham Hotspur and became its chairman in 2001; UEFA rules not allowing clubs with the same owner to compete in the same competition led to the eventual sale of the other clubs.

== Tottenham Hotspur ==
Levy first made an attempt to buy Tottenham Hotspur from Alan Sugar in July 1998 but failed. Another attempt was made in July 2000 which was also rejected, but increasing hostility by fans towards Sugar eventually persuaded him to sell. Levy was then appointed to the board of Tottenham Hotspur on 20 December 2000 after ENIC initiated the purchase of a 27% stake in the club from Sugar for £22 million, bringing their total stake to 29.9%, the maximum permissible before ENIC had to bid for the entire company. He replaced Sugar as executive chairman of Tottenham Hotspur in February 2001 on the completion of the sale, and took over the day-to-day running of the club in October 2001. ENIC eventually substantially increased their shareholding and gained control of the company after buying the remaining shares from Sugar in 2007 for £25m, as well as those of other shareholders, eventually acquiring 85.55% of Tottenham. ENIC moved the club into private ownership in 2012. Levy became the highest-paid Premier League chief executive, with an annual remuneration of over £6 million in the 2016–17 season. On 4 September 2025, Levy stepped down as the executive chairman of Tottenham Hotspur as part of a broader management shake-up. He was succeeded by Peter Charrington.

=== Managers ===
The first manager appointed with Levy at the helm was Glenn Hoddle in 2001. Hoddle was sacked following a poor start to the 2003–04 season in September 2003. He was followed in quick succession by Jacques Santini and Martin Jol. Jol had some success moving Tottenham out of the mid-table position, but was dismissed in the 2007–08 season after the team had only won one out of the first ten games.

Juande Ramos succeeded as head coach in 2008. He delivered the League Cup, the first trophy under Levy's stewardship and the club's first in nine years, but Levy made the decision to replace him with Harry Redknapp on 25 October 2008 after Ramos made the worst start to a league campaign in the club's history during the 2008–09 season. Redknapp guided Spurs to a top-four finish in the 2009–10 season, winning an entry into the qualification round of the UEFA Champions League for the first time. Tottenham reached the knockout stage of the 2010–11 Champions League but lost there to Real Madrid 0–5 on aggregate. The club finished fifth in the Premier League in the 2010–11 season, missing out on Champions League qualification but securing a place in the Europa League. On 13 June 2012, Redknapp was sacked after failing to agree terms for a new deal.

On 3 July, Levy appointed former Chelsea and Porto boss Andre Villas-Boas the team's new head coach. Following some poor results in the first half of the 2013–14 season, including a 5–0 home defeat to Liverpool, Levy sacked Villas-Boas on 16 December 2013. Head of Football Development and former player Tim Sherwood was subsequently announced as head coach, but he also left at the end of the season.

On 27 May 2014, Levy appointed former Southampton manager Mauricio Pochettino as head coach. The team reached the League Cup final in Pochettino's first season in charge, which also saw a number of the club's academy players step up to establish themselves in the first team, including Harry Kane, Ryan Mason, Nabil Bentaleb and Andros Townsend. Pochettino's team qualified for Europe with a fifth-place finish in 2014–15 before challenging for the Premier League title in the 2015–16 and 2016–17 seasons with a squad with the youngest average age in the league. In the latter season, Tottenham finished 2nd in the league, making it their highest league position since the 1962–63 season under Bill Nicholson. The team have been ranked among the top 4 since the 2015–16 season, allowing them to qualify for and participate in the Champions League since 2016–17. Tottenham reached the Champions League final for the first time in 2018–19, losing to Liverpool 0–2.

On 19 November 2019, Pochettino was sacked, being replaced the following day by José Mourinho. After 17 months in charge, Mourinho was sacked on 19 April 2021 after a spate of losses and a disappointing second half of the 2020–21 season. Former player Ryan Mason served as an interim manager for the rest of the season, losing to Manchester City in the 2021 League Cup final 0–1.

On 30 June 2021, Levy appointed Nuno Espírito Santo the head coach on a two-year deal. Nuno was sacked on 1 November 2021 following a run of poor results which saw Tottenham lose four out of six previous Premier League games. On 2 November 2021, Levy appointed Antonio Conte the new head coach on an 18-month deal, with an option to extend further. The team's form improved under Conte and resulted in Tottenham qualifying for the UEFA Champions League. He was sacked in March 2023 following a run of poor results and Champions League elimination at the hands of Milan. Conte's assistant, Cristian Stellini, was appointed as interim manager with the intention of finishing the season, but was sacked himself following a 6–1 defeat to Newcastle. Ryan Mason returned in his stead.

Ange Postecoglou was appointed the new head coach on 6 June 2023. Postecoglou won the 2025 Europa League, Tottenham's first trophy in 17 years, but was sacked on 6 June 2025 for the poor results in the Premier League. After his dismissal from the club, Levy appointed Thomas Frank as Tottenham's new head coach.

=== Finance and negotiations ===
Levy is noted for maintaining a relatively modest wage structure at Tottenham compared to the other big six clubs of the Premier League; the club spent the least on wages among the top six in the 2018–19 season, and it had the lowest wage/revenue percentage of all clubs in the Premier League. Levy has described the spending by the league's other clubs as unsustainable. In the 2017–18 season, Tottenham made a profit of £113 million (£138.9m pre-tax), a world record for a football club. By 2023, the yearly revenue for the club had reached a record £549.6 million. The club was valued at around £80 million when ENIC first attempted to buy a stake in 1998, and by 2019, its valuations had increased to £1.3–1.8 billion.

Levy is the chief negotiator in the transfer of players for Tottenham. He has acquired a reputation for tough negotiation in the club's transfer dealings; former Manchester United manager Sir Alex Ferguson described negotiating with Levy over the transfer of Dimitar Berbatov as "more painful than my hip replacement". In 2013, Levy negotiated a then-world record fee of £86 million for the transfer of Gareth Bale to Real Madrid. Levy is particularly known for his last-minute dealings on deadline days, with notable examples including the signings of Rafael van der Vaart and Hugo Lloris. He is also known for targeting young players, in the hopes of developing them into major stars; this strategy has seen such successes as Gareth Bale, Christian Eriksen, and Son Heung-min.

Levy has been criticised by Tottenham supporters and pundits alike for not investing more money in the transfer market; in the first four years of Pochettino's tenure as Spurs manager, the club had a net spend of £29 million on transfer fees, considerably lower than the other major clubs in the same period. In 2018, Tottenham became the first Premier League club to make no signings during a summer transfer window.

Levy has been instrumental in attracting corporate partners to the club in multi-million pound sponsorship deals, including current partners Nike and AIA. He negotiated multiple shirt sponsorships in 2010, agreeing a deal with software infrastructure company Autonomy as the club's shirt sponsor in the Premier League, while Investec became shirt sponsor for Champions League and domestic cup competitions.

Levy has also promoted governance issues related to the Premier League, most recently advocating enhanced financial controls for all owners to ensure the long-term financial stability of clubs. In 2007, he lobbied successfully for clubs to be allowed to name seven players on the substitute bench, in order to encourage the inclusion of youngsters; the change was ratified in February 2008.

=== Club training ground ===
In 2012, the club moved to its new training base set in 80 acres of greenbelt land. Planning and construction of the facility took over seven years and a player accommodation lodge was added later. The Brazil national team stayed at the lodge to prepare for the 2018 World Cup.

=== New stadium ===
Levy oversaw the construction of a new, larger stadium adjacent to and replacing the White Hart Lane site, from its design to the construction. The Northumberland Development Project was announced in 2008, with the building of a new club stadium as its centrepiece. After some delay, the construction of the new venue started in 2015. The stadium was designed with an initial capacity of 62,062, making it the largest club stadium in London and the second largest in the country. The project is intended to be a catalyst for the regeneration of Tottenham to bring new jobs and homes to the area.

For the 2017–18 season, Levy negotiated the club's move to Wembley Stadium for one year to allow demolition of the old venue and the completion of a new stadium on the same site as White Hart Lane. During their time at Wembley, the club broke the Premier League attendance record several times, as well as the Champions League attendance record for a British club.

The new stadium officially opened on 3 April 2019, branded as Tottenham Hotspur Stadium. It includes the world's first dividing retractable pitch to accommodate other leading sports, notably American football (NFL) games, and entertainment events. The design allowed the club to agree a ten-year deal to host NFL matches at their new home from 2018 onwards. The stadium is reported to have cost £1.2 billion, and a financial analysis in February 2021 indicated that construction of the stadium is largely responsible for burdening Tottenham with a £1.177 billion debt, the biggest of all European clubs.

== Awards ==
In November 2017, Levy was named CEO of the Year at the Football Business Awards. He was appointed Commander of the Order of the British Empire (CBE) in the 2026 New Year Honours for services to Charity and the community in Tottenham.

== Personal life ==
Levy is Jewish. He is married to his former PA, Tracy Dixon, and they have four children.

His son, Josh Levy, is a non executive director of pub chain, Mitchell & Butler.
