= Cristian Stellini =

Italian football manager (born 1974)

Personal information
- Full name: Cristian Stellini
- Date of birth: 27 April 1974 (age 52)
- Place of birth: Cuggiono, Italy
- Height: 1.80 m (5 ft 11 in)
- Position: Defender

Youth career
- 1991–1992: Novara

Senior career*
Years	Team	Apps	(Gls)
1992–1994	Novara	30	(0)
1994–1996	SPAL	53	(1)
1996–2000	Ternana	110	(3)
2000–2003	Como	100	(4)
2003	Modena	2	(0)
2004–2007	Genoa	95	(5)
2007–2010	Bari	66	(2)
Total		392	(13)

Managerial career
- 2017: Alessandria
- 2023: Tottenham Hotspur (interim)
- * Club domestic league appearances and goals

Cristian Stellini (born 27 April 1974) is an Italian professional football coach and former player who was most recently the assistant head coach of Serie A club Napoli.

== Playing career ==
Stellini played for Novara (Serie C2), SPAL (Serie C1) before joining Ternana of Serie C2 in October 1996. He won promotion twice for the team to Serie B in summer 1998. In summer 2000, he joined Como of Serie C1, where he won multiple promotions again, reaching Serie A in 2002. He made his Serie A debut on 14 September 2002 against Empoli.

In the summer of 2003, Stellini joined Modena, but suffered a major leg injury. After playing just twice, he moved to Genoa.

During Stellini's time at Genoa, the Caso Genoa scandal saw the club relegated to Serie C. Stellini remained at the club, however, and helped them win promotion back to Serie A.

== Coaching career ==
In 2011, Stellini joined Antonio Conte's coaching team at Juventus, and passed the category 2 coaching exam. However, in 2012, Stellini was suspended for two and a half years by the FIGC following allegations of match fixing. He subsequently resigned from his post as technical assistant at Juventus.

Stellini made his return to football as youth coach of Genoa from 2015 to 2017.

In June 2017, Stellini was named new head coach of Lega Pro club Alessandria, signing a two-year contract. He was dismissed on 20 November 2017 due to poor results.

Stellini joined Conte's managerial staff at Inter ahead of the 2019–20 season. Stellini won the Scudetto with Inter during the 2020–21 season, managing the team to three victories when Conte was suspended for yellow card accumulation.

Stellini once again linked up with Conte at Tottenham Hotspur, resuming his role as assistant manager. In the final game of the 2022–23 UEFA Champions League group stage, Stellini led the team to a victory at Marseille, earning Spurs a spot in the knockout stage and winning the group in the process.

In February 2023, it was confirmed that Conte required gallbladder surgery to recover from cholecystitis and therefore required a period of recuperation following the surgery. As assistant manager, Stellini assumed Conte's duties on an interim basis for the duration of his recovery. Stellini managed a Tottenham game for the second time on 5 February, a 1–0 home win against Manchester City. Conte made his return to the dugout for Tottenham's following two games, a 4–1 defeat to Leicester City and 1–0 defeat to AC Milan; however, it was then announced that he would return to Italy to continue his recovery; as a result, Stellini once again assumed management responsibilities, and in his first match back, led Spurs to a 2–0 victory against West Ham United, followed by another 2–0 victory against Chelsea.

On 26 March 2023, following exits from the Champions League and the FA Cup and his outburst in the post-match press conference after Tottenham Hotspur's 3–3 draw with Southampton, Conte left the club by mutual consent. Stellini, originally deputy to Conte, was appointed by Daniel Levy as acting head coach until the end of the season, with Ryan Mason serving as his assistant. In his first game as acting head coach, on 3 April, his side drew 1–1 with Everton, conceding a late goal. On 15 April, Tottenham lost 3–2 against Bournemouth, conceding a late goal once more. On 23 April, Tottenham suffered a 6–1 loss against Newcastle, going 5–0 down inside 21 minutes, which undermined their effort to finish in the top four, in order to compete in the next season's Champions League. He was relieved of his duties the following day, being replaced by Ryan Mason as caretaker manager.

== Career statistics ==
=== Managerial ===
As of match played 23 April 2023

Managerial record by club and tenure
Team	From	To	Record				
Team	From	To	M	W	D	L	Win %
Alessandria	1 July 2017	20 November 2017	16	3	6	7	18.75
Tottenham Hotspur (interim)	26 March 2023	24 April 2023	4	1	1	2	25.00
Total			20	4	7	9	20.00
