= Ryan Mason =

English association football player and manager (born 1991)

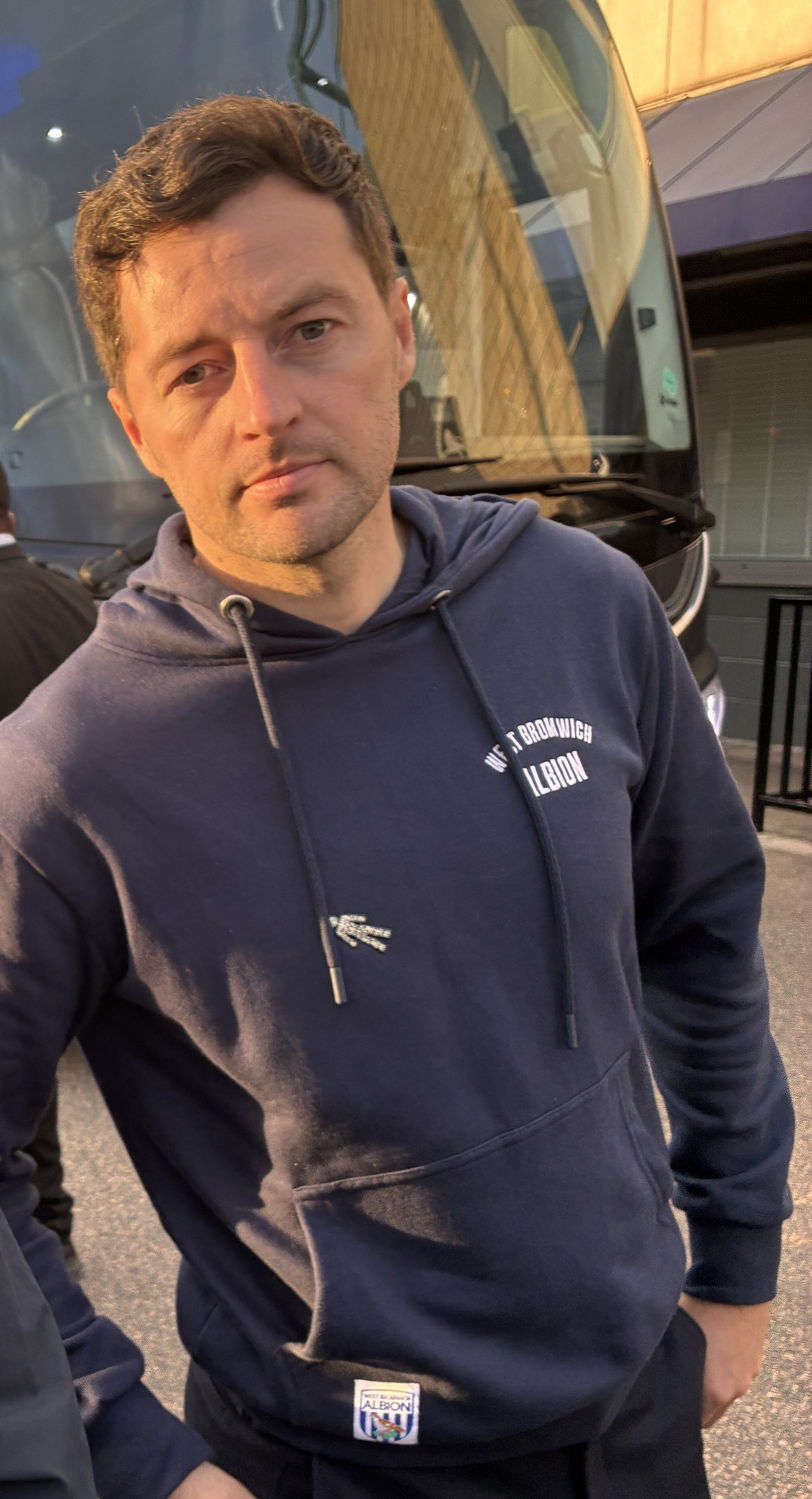
- Mason with West Bromwich Albion in 2025

Personal information
- Full name: Ryan Glen Mason
- Date of birth: 13 June 1991 (age 35)
- Place of birth: Enfield, London, England
- Height: 5 ft 9 in (1.75 m)
- Position: Midfielder

Youth career
- 1999–2008: Tottenham Hotspur

Senior career*
Years	Team	Apps	(Gls)
2008–2016	Tottenham Hotspur	53	(2)
2009–2010	→ Yeovil Town (loan)	28	(6)
2010	→ Doncaster Rovers (loan)	5	(0)
2011	→ Doncaster Rovers (loan)	10	(0)
2011	→ Doncaster Rovers (loan)	4	(0)
2012	→ Millwall (loan)	5	(0)
2013	→ Lorient (loan)	0	(0)
2013	→ Lorient B (loan)	4	(0)
2013–2014	→ Swindon Town (loan)	18	(5)
2016–2018	Hull City	16	(1)
Total		143	(14)

International career
2009–2010	England U19	4	(1)
2011	England U20	1	(0)
2015	England	1	(0)

Managerial career
- 2021: Tottenham Hotspur (interim)
- 2023: Tottenham Hotspur (interim)
- 2025–2026: West Bromwich Albion
- * Club domestic league appearances and goals

Ryan Glen Mason (born 13 June 1991) is an English professional football coach and former player who was most recently the head coach of EFL Championship club West Bromwich Albion.

A midfielder, Mason progressed through the youth ranks at Tottenham Hotspur and made his first team debut in 2008. He was loaned to Yeovil Town, Doncaster Rovers, Millwall, Lorient and Swindon Town, and played his first Premier League match for Tottenham in 2014. After establishing himself in the Tottenham first team squad, he made his full international debut for England in March 2015. Mason moved to Hull City in 2016 for a club record fee, where he suffered a fractured skull in January 2017 in a match against Chelsea. After a prolonged treatment and on the advice of medical specialists, he retired from professional football in February 2018.

Mason was interim head coach of Tottenham in 2021 and 2023, becoming the youngest coach in Premier League history, at 29. He was appointed Head Coach of West Bromwich Albion in June 2025, but was sacked in January 2026.

== Early life ==
Mason was born in Enfield, London. As well as attending Enfield Grammar School, Mason attended Cheshunt School and was a District hurdles champion.

== Club career ==
=== Tottenham Hotspur ===
==== Beginnings ====
Mason joined the Tottenham Hotspur academy aged eight, before signing a professional contract with the club in August 2008. He made his first-team debut in the group stages of the UEFA Cup on 27 November 2008, coming on as an added-time substitute for David Bentley in a 1–0 away win against Dutch club NEC. During the 2008–09 season he topped the Academy scoring sheets with 29 goals in 31 matches as Spurs finished runners-up in the Premier Academy League.

==== Loans ====
On 13 June 2009, Mason went on loan to League One club Yeovil Town, along with teammate Steven Caulker. He made his league debut on 8 August in their first match of the 2009–10 season, a 2–0 win against Tranmere Rovers at Huish Park. Mason made a promising start to his time at Yeovil, scoring from a free kick in his second match against Colchester United albeit in a 1–2 away defeat, and from a long-range strike in their next match against Exeter City to earn an away draw. The goal against Exeter was included in BBC Sport's "Goals of the Week". According to the Spurs website, "after impressing for Terry Skiverton's men at the start of the 2009–10 season, the loan deal was extended for a further three months". Along with fellow Tottenham loanees, Caulker and Jonathan Obika, on 5 November 2009, Mason's loan was extended until May 2010. He was recalled prematurely, on 13 March 2010, after playing 28 league matches and scoring six goals for Yeovil.

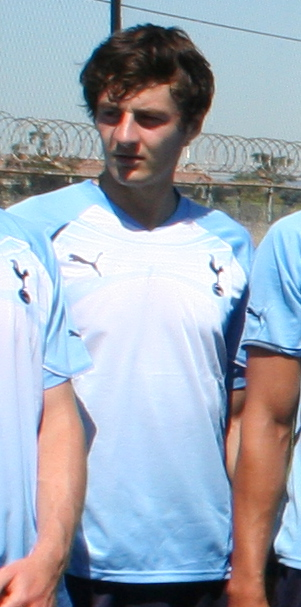
Mason training with Tottenham Hotspur in 2010

In August 2010, Mason was loaned for the first time to Championship team Doncaster Rovers on a two-month loan deal, and made five appearances. Then in January 2011, he was loaned back to Doncaster until the end of the season and made a further ten appearances.

On 28 July 2011, Mason signed a new two-year contract with Tottenham, keeping him at the club until June 2013. He was then immediately loaned back to Doncaster on a season-long loan. Mason was recalled back to Tottenham in November 2011 after making five appearances since the start of the season. On 29 December 2011, Mason and teammate Harry Kane agreed a loan deal with Championship club Millwall from 1 January until the end of the season.

Mason made an appearance in Tottenham's goalless draw in the Europa League group stages against Lazio at White Hart Lane on 20 September 2012, coming on as an added-time substitute for Mousa Dembélé. He made his first Tottenham start six days later in a League Cup last 32 match against Carlisle United, a 3–0 away win.

On the last day of the winter transfer window, Mason joined Ligue 1 club Lorient on loan for the remainder of the 2012–13 season, making his move out of England for the first time. It was terminated in April 2013 with Mason having failed to make a senior appearance.

On 23 July 2013, Mason signed on a season-long loan for League One Swindon Town, joining fellow Tottenham players Massimo Luongo, Grant Hall and Alex Pritchard. On 31 August, he scored a hat trick against Crewe Alexandra in a 5–0 win.

==== 2014–15 season ====
After a successful pre-season in the United States with Spurs, Mason was included in Mauricio Pochettino's Premier League squad. On 24 September 2014, he made his first appearance of the season as well as scoring his first goal for Tottenham, an equaliser in a League Cup fixture against Nottingham Forest, which Spurs went on to win 3–1. Later that week, on 27 September 2014, he made his Premier League debut for Spurs in a 1–1 draw away at Arsenal. Mason subsequently established himself as a regular member of the first team.

On 2 November, against Aston Villa, Mason stuck his head in the chest of opponent Christian Benteke, who reacted by striking him with his hand. Referee Neil Swarbrick sent off Benteke but took no action against Mason. The incident led to both clubs being fined £20,000 by The Football Association (FA) for failing to keep their players under control. In January 2015, Mason was awarded a five-and-a-half-year contract, keeping him at the club until 2020. He started in the 2015 League Cup Final at Wembley Stadium on 1 March, in which Tottenham were beaten 2–0 by Chelsea. Mason scored his first Premier League goal, Tottenham's second of the match, in a 3–2 win against Swansea City.

==== 2015–16 season ====
On 13 September 2015, Mason scored his second league goal for Spurs, an 82nd-minute winner in a man of the match performance which came in a 1–0 victory over Sunderland. In scoring the goal, however, he received an injury that ruled him out for several matches. He made his comeback from injury as a substitute in Spurs' 5–1 win against Bournemouth. On 18 February 2016, Mason captained the team against Fiorentina in a 1–1 draw in the UEFA Europa League. He then scored in a 3–0 win in the second leg, his second goal of the season.

=== Hull City and retirement ===
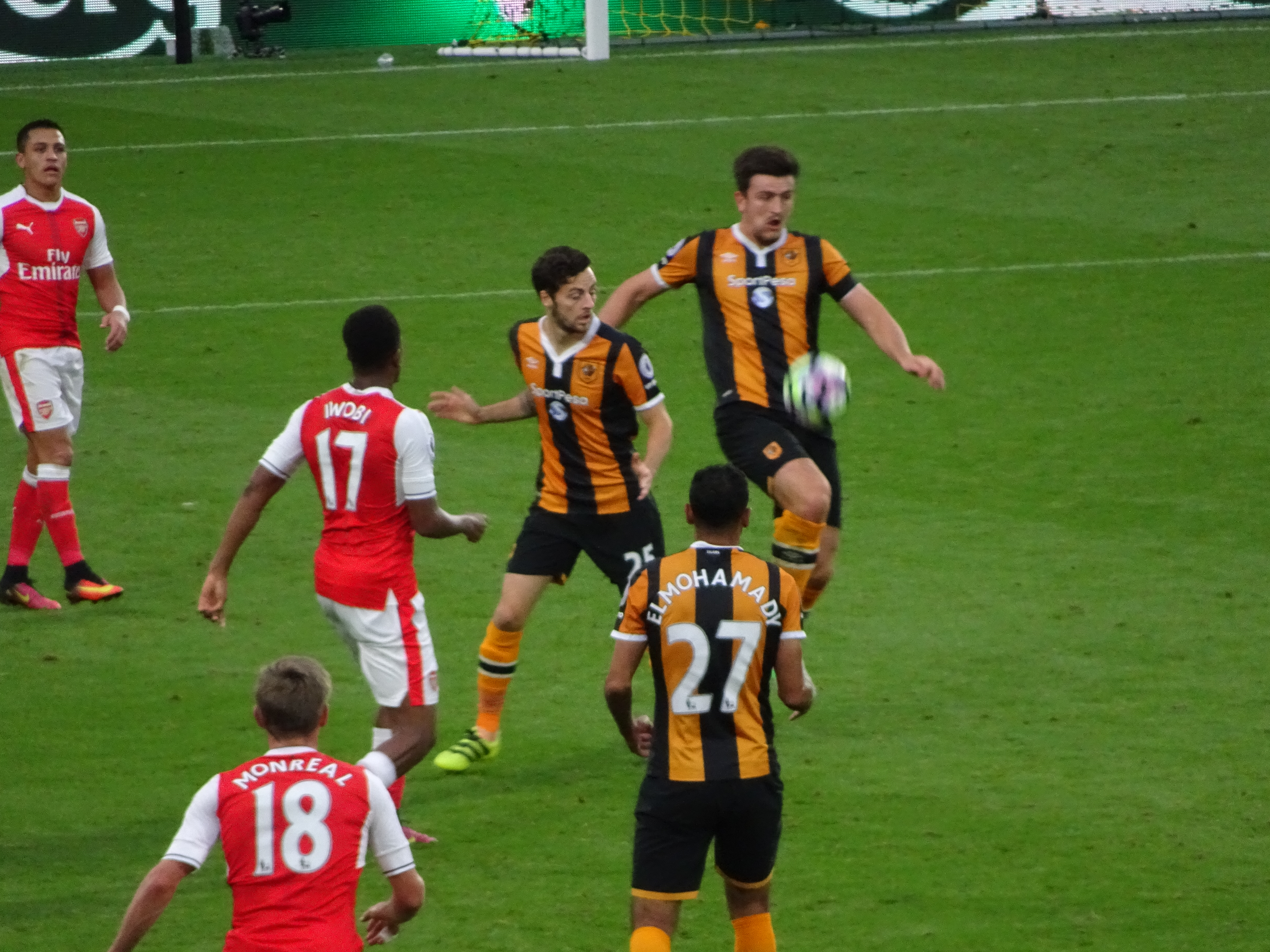
Mason (in orange and black, number 25), playing for Hull against Arsenal in 2016

After a disappointing 2015–16 campaign with only eight league starts, Mason was bought by Hull City on 30 August 2016, for a fee believed to be around £13 million, a club record. He made his debut away to Burnley when he came off the bench to replace David Meyler after 73 minutes. He scored his first goal for Hull in a 2–1 EFL Cup win over Stoke City on 21 September 2016. On 22 January 2017, in a Premier League match against Chelsea, Mason suffered a fractured skull that required surgery after a clash of heads with defender Gary Cahill.

Mason underwent a successful operation on the head injury, and throughout the rest of 2017 went through a rehabilitation process in an attempt to return to playing. After the operation he had 14 metal plates in his skull, with 28 screws holding them in place. He also had 45 staples and a six-inch scar across his head. On 13 February 2018, it was confirmed that due to risks associated with the extent of Mason's injury, he would be retiring from professional football.

Since his retirement through injury, Mason has called for the Football Association to ban children from heading regulation-weight footballs, and for players to be protected from the risks of concussion.

== International career ==
Mason received his first call up to the England under-19 team for the match against Russia, but only made the stand-by list and did not take part in the match. He was called up for European Championship qualification in Slovenia in October 2009. Mason played in two of the three matches and grabbed the second England goal in the 2–0 win over Slovakia to help to ensure England's 100% record. Mason achieved his third and fourth caps for the U19s in friendlies against Turkey and the Netherlands respectively.

In February 2011, Mason received a call up to the England under-20 team for their friendly against France, and received his first cap coming on as a 70th-minute substitute in that match.

On 23 March 2015, Mason received his first call up to the senior England team for a European qualifier against Lithuania and a friendly against Italy, after Adam Lallana withdrew due to injury. He made his debut in the latter match on the 31st, replacing Jordan Henderson for the last 16 minutes of a 1–1 draw at Juventus Stadium, assisting Andros Townsend's late equaliser.

== Coaching career ==
=== Tottenham Hotspur ===
Mason joined the coaching staff of Tottenham Hotspur in April 2018. In February 2019, he suggested that heading should be banned for children. He was made the official academy coach for the Under-19 UEFA Youth League side in July 2019, and then the head of player development (U-17 to U-23) in August 2020.

On 20 April 2021, following the dismissal of José Mourinho as head coach, Mason was named interim head coach of Tottenham Hotspur until the end of the season. At the age of 29, he became the youngest manager of a Premier League team; the previous record holder Attilio Lombardo of Crystal Palace was 32. Mason won his first match in charge of Tottenham, who beat Southampton at home 2–1 on 21 April. Four days later, the club lost the 2021 EFL Cup Final by a single goal to Manchester City. He oversaw five more games in charge, winning three and losing two with Tottenham finishing seventh at the end of the season, after a 4–2 victory over Leicester City on the final day of the season. His side finished one point above rivals Arsenal, and secured a UEFA Europa Conference League spot.

On 4 November 2021, following the appointment of Antonio Conte as head coach, Mason was promoted to the role of first team coach after impressing Conte during his handling of leading training all week.

During Conte's health-related absences in February 2023, Mason worked closely alongside assistant head coach Cristian Stellini in the Tottenham dugout. On 26 March, after Conte left by mutual consent, Mason was made acting assistant head coach alongside Stellini as acting head coach until the end of the season. On 24 April, Stellini was sacked after a 6–1 loss to Newcastle United, and Mason took over as acting head coach.

In his first game as acting head coach, on 27 April, his side drew 2–2 with Manchester United, including a comeback despite being two goals down. He oversaw the Spurs' final six matches of the 2022–23 season, winning two, drawing one, and losing three games. Despite a 4–1 win away at Leeds United on matchday 38, Spurs missed out on European qualification for the first time since the 2008–09 season. On 27 June 2023, Mason was appointed as one of the assistant coaches to Tottenham's new head coach Ange Postecoglou.

=== West Bromwich Albion ===
On 2 June 2025, Mason was appointed head coach of Championship side West Bromwich Albion on a three-year contract. On 6 January 2026, following a 2–1 defeat at Leicester City – the Baggies’ 11th successive away defeat, Mason was sacked after 7 months in charge with the club sitting 18th in the Championship.

== Personal life ==
Mason married Rachel Peters in Mallorca in 2022. Together they have a son (born in 2017) and two daughters (born in 2019 and 2023).

== Career statistics ==
=== Club ===
Appearances and goals by club, season and competition
Club	Season	League			FA Cup		League Cup		Other		Total	
Club	Season	Division	Apps	Goals	Apps	Goals	Apps	Goals	Apps	Goals	Apps	Goals
Tottenham Hotspur	2008–09	Premier League	0	0	0	0	0	0	1 (Note: Appearance in UEFA Cup)	0	1	0
Tottenham Hotspur	2009–10	Premier League	0	0	—		—		—		0	0
Tottenham Hotspur	2010–11	Premier League	0	0	0	0	—		0	0	0	0
Tottenham Hotspur	2011–12	Premier League	0	0	—		—		0	0	0	0
Tottenham Hotspur	2012–13	Premier League	0	0	0	0	1	0	2 (Note: Appearances in UEFA Europa League)	0	3	0
Tottenham Hotspur	2014–15	Premier League	31	1	0	0	4	1	2	0	37	2
Tottenham Hotspur	2015–16	Premier League	22	1	1	0	0	0	6	1	29	2
Tottenham Hotspur	2016–17	Premier League	0	0	—		—		—		0	0
Tottenham Hotspur	Total		53	2	1	0	5	1	11	1	70	4
Yeovil Town (loan)	2009–10	League One	28	6	1	0	—		0	0	29	6
Doncaster Rovers (loan)	2010–11	Championship	15	0	—		—		—		15	0
Doncaster Rovers (loan)	2011–12	Championship	4	0	—		1	1	—		5	1
Doncaster Rovers (loan)	Total		19	0	—		1	1	—		20	1
Millwall (loan)	2011–12	Championship	5	0	1	0	—		—		6	0
Lorient (loan)	2012–13	Ligue 1	0	0	—		—		—		0	0
Lorient B (loan)	2012–13	Championnat de France Amateur	4	0	—		—		—		4	0
Swindon Town (loan)	2013–14	League One	18	5	1	0	2	0	1 (Note: Appearance in Football League Trophy)	0	22	5
Hull City	2016–17	Premier League	16	1	1	0	3	1	—		20	2
Hull City	2017–18	Championship	0	0	0	0	0	0	—		0	0
Hull City	Total		16	1	1	0	3	1	—		20	2
Career total			143	14	5	0	11	3	12	1	171	18

=== International ===
Appearances and goals by national team and year
National team	Year	Apps	Goals
England	2015	1	0
Total		1	0

== Managerial statistics ==
As of match played 5 January 2026

Managerial record by team and tenure
Team	From	To	Record					Ref
Team	From	To	P	W	D	L	Win %	Ref
Tottenham Hotspur (interim)	20 April 2021	30 June 2021	7	4	0	3	57.14	
Tottenham Hotspur (acting)	24 April 2023	6 June 2023	6	2	1	3	33.33	
West Bromwich Albion	2 June 2025	6 January 2026	27	9	5	13	33.33	
Total			40	15	6	19	37.50	

== Honours ==
=== Player ===
Tottenham Hotspur

- Football League Cup runner-up: 2014–15

=== Manager ===
Tottenham Hotspur

- EFL Cup runner-up: 2020–21
