= ENIC Group =

British investment company

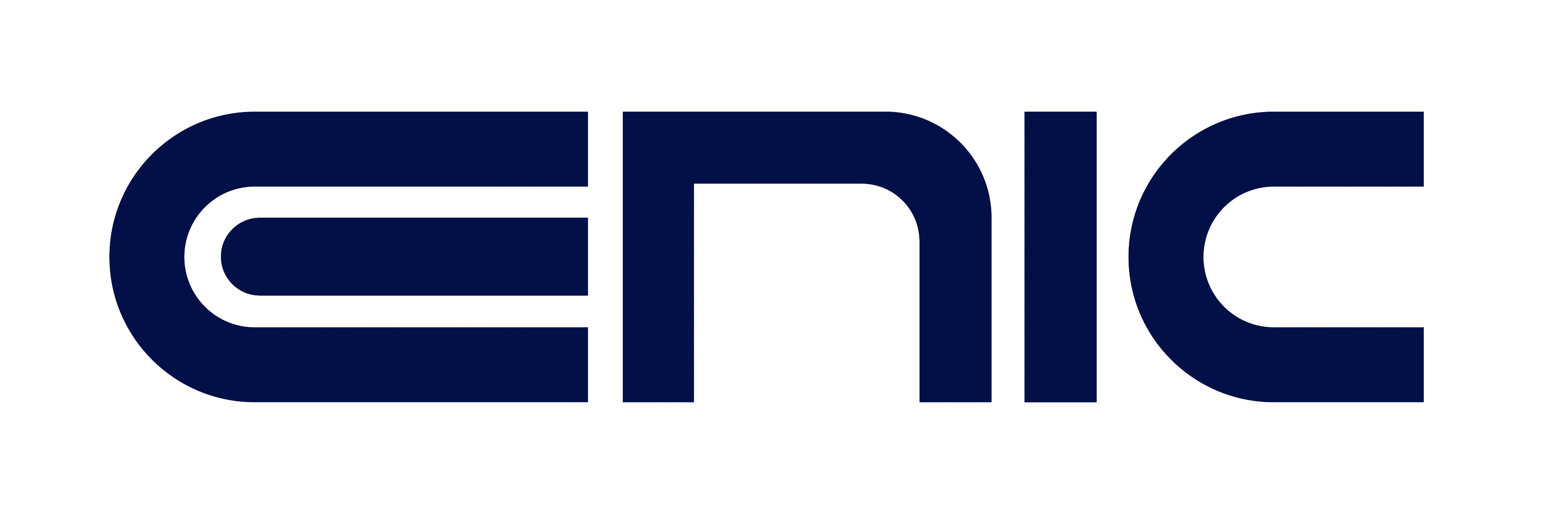
ENIC Logo

ENIC Group (formerly English National Investment Company) is a British investment company. ENIC is owned by the family trust of Joe Lewis. ENIC's Bahamas-registered subsidiary, ENIC International Limited, currently holds 86.58% of the total issued share capital of English Premier League club Tottenham Hotspur. Former club chairman Daniel Levy and his family formerly owned 29.88% of the share capital of ENIC International Limited, while a discretionary trust of Lewis's family owns 70.12%. In 2026, it was reported that Levy had sold most of his share to Eight Sports Capital, an investment group, leaving him with just 4.89%, though this has not been confirmed by the ENIC, Levy or the club, and sale had not gone through by August 2026.

== History ==
Previously a private investment trust, English National Investment Company was floated on the London Stock Exchange in 1997 as ENIC plc and became a holding company for sports, media and leisure businesses. During the football investment boom of the mid to late 1990s, it began to acquire shares in football clubs around Europe and bought stakes in Tottenham Hotspur (29.9%), Rangers (25.1%), Slavia Prague (96.7%), AEK Athens (47%), Vicenza (99.9%) and Basel (50%).

As well as football clubs, ENIC also invested in other businesses, such as software company Autonomy, retailer Warner Bros. Studio Stores, gambling website ukbetting.com and entertainment complex Church Street Station.

In 2001, ENIC bought a controlling stake in Tottenham Hotspur from Alan Sugar and Levy became chairman of the club. Later in 2001, ENIC's listing was transferred from the main stock exchange to the AIM index.

In 2003, Joe Lewis and Daniel Levy, who controlled 52% of ENIC shares, formed Kondar Ltd to buy out the remaining shareholders. A cash offer of £40m was made to take the company back into private ownership. Following the buyout, Lewis and Levy controlled 70.6% and 29.4% respectively of shares in ENIC, which was delisted from AIM and renamed ENIC Group.

In May 2006, ENIC transferred 61% stake in Slavia Prague to Czech brokerage firm Key Investments. In January 2008, Key Investment breached the contract with ENIC and increased the equity of Slavia Prague.

Following its purchase of Sugar's remaining shares in Tottenham Hotspur in 2007, ENIC continued to build up its stake, taking its shareholding to 85%. To fund this investment, it disposed of its stakes in other football clubs, as well as many of its media and entertainment businesses.

On 24 May 2022, Tottenham Hotspur announced a capital increase of up to £150 million from ENIC via the issue of shares. The announcement claimed "the equity injection provides the Premier League club with greater financial flexibility and the ability to further invest on and off the pitch."

In October 2022, Joe Lewis transferred ownership of ENIC to the Lewis Family Trust and is no longer associated with Tottenham Hotspur.
