= 2020–21 Manchester City F.C. season =

English football club season

Manchester City
2020–21 season
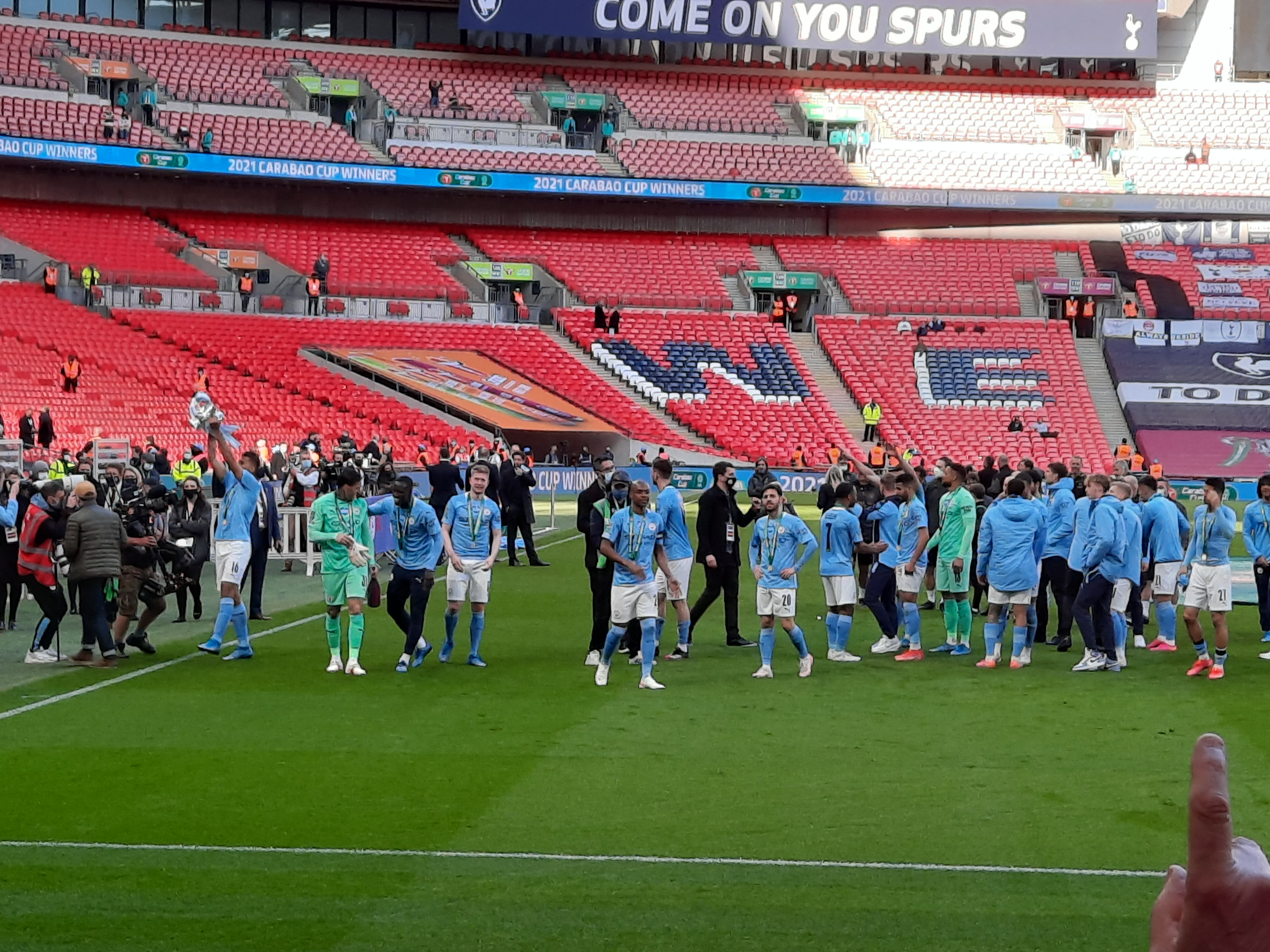
- Manchester City players celebrating their EFL Cup victory
- Owner: City Football Group
- Chairman: Khaldoon Al Mubarak
- Manager: Pep Guardiola
- Stadium: City of Manchester Stadium
- Premier League: 1st
- FA Cup: Semi-finals
- EFL Cup: Winners
- UEFA Champions League: Runners-up
- Top goalscorer: League: İlkay Gündoğan (13); All: İlkay Gündoğan (17)
Home colours	Away colours	Third colours

The 2020–21 season was Manchester City Football Club's 119th in existence and their 19th consecutive season in the top flight of English football. In addition to the domestic league, Manchester City participated in this season's editions of the FA Cup and the EFL Cup, as well as the UEFA Champions League, entering the competition for the tenth consecutive year, with their best result being a semi-final in 2016. The season covered the period from 16 August 2020 to 30 June 2021.

During this season, City achieved a remarkable winning streak, which ran 82 days from December 2020 to March 2021. During this run, City broke the records for most consecutive wins by a top flight English team in all competitions (21), the most consecutive league wins by a top flight team from the start of a calendar year (13) and equalled their club record for 28 games unbeaten in all competitions. City also set a record run of consecutive away wins in all competitions for a top flight team (20), a club and English record run of consecutive unbeaten away matches (23) and an English record run of consecutive away league wins (12) during this season.

On 14 April, City advanced to the Champions League semi-finals for the first time in five years, after three consecutive quarter-final eliminations in 2018–20. On 25 April, the Blues defeated Tottenham to win their record-equalling fourth consecutive, and eighth overall, League Cup title. On 4 May, City reached the Champions League final for the first time in their history as they defeated Paris Saint-Germain 4–1 on aggregate in the semi-finals. On 11 May, the Citizens were officially confirmed as Premier League champions for the third time in four seasons following a 1–2 home defeat of second-placed Manchester United at the hands of Leicester City. On 29 May, City were defeated 1–0 by Chelsea in the Champions League final, ending their hopes of winning a treble and clinching the first European trophy since 1970.

Rúben Dias, Phil Foden, Kevin De Bruyne and Pep Guardiola were amongst the City representatives recognised in the various end of season awards. The season was the first since 2009–10 without David Silva, who departed to join Real Sociedad and a first since 2015-16 without Leroy Sané, who departed to join Bayern Munich.

== Kits ==
Supplier: Puma / Sponsor: Etihad Airways (Front) / Nexen Tire (Sleeves)

Home	Home alternate (Note: Used on match week 20 against West Bromwich Albion.)	Away	Third	Goalkeeper 1	Goalkeeper 2	Goalkeeper 3	Goalkeeper 4

== Season summary ==
=== Start of season ===
The 2020–21 season began in September 2020 during the global COVID-19 pandemic. The protocols used to permit the 2019–20 Premier League season to be concluded were extended into the new season so that professional sport could be played in front of a television audience, with the expectation that fans would be able to attend games in person once infection rates fell and public health restrictions could be lifted. However, by the end of March 2021 only one game involving Manchester City (away against Southampton on 19 December) had been played in front of (2,000) spectators.

City had invested heavily in their central defence during the summer with the purchases of Rúben Dias from Benfica and Nathan Aké from Bournemouth. Nicolás Otamendi moved in the opposite direction to Dias to join the Portuguese side. The transfers were designed to improve the team's perceived weakness in the defensive area since Vincent Kompany had left City at the end of the 2018–19 season. Ferran Torres was also signed from Valencia as a replacement winger for Leroy Sané, who had departed for Bayern Munich.

Some initially inconsistent league results left City in the bottom half of the table when they were defeated 2–0 by Tottenham Hotspur on 21 November (albeit with a game in hand over many of the clubs above them). However, their league form improved for the remainder of the year as the Blues ended 2020 with no further defeats. This was mainly due to City's defensive record, with them registering six consecutive clean sheets in all competitions and ending the year with 13 clean sheets in total from 23 games played. City were undefeated in cup competitions by the end of 2020, reaching the semi-finals of the Carabao Cup for the fourth consecutive year and, more importantly, the knockout stage of the UEFA Champions League for the eighth consecutive season, with their highest ever group stage points total (16 points).

Initially, City were less effective at the other end of the pitch than they had been in the previous three seasons. In part, this was due to the injury of Sergio Agüero, that had been carried over from the end of the prior season, and further injuries to Agüero and Gabriel Jesus that left City without a recognised first team striker in the squad until the beginning of December.

=== Christmas and New Year ===
A SARS-CoV-2 outbreak at the City Football Academy over Christmas led to the postponement of City's game versus Everton on 28 December to 17 February, and up to nine first team players were in isolation at the beginning of the new year, including, once again, Sergio Agüero and Gabriel Jesus.

Nevertheless, City's good form continued into January 2021, with the team ending the month with a perfect 100% win record in all nine of their competitive fixtures, the most by a team in the top four tiers of English football in a single month since the formation of the Football League in 1888. In the process they beat Manchester United in a single legged semi-final to reach City's fourth consecutive League Cup final, reached the fifth round of the FA Cup, extended their unbeaten run in the Premier League to twelve games with eight consecutive wins, climbed the table from 9th to 1st and achieved nineteen games unbeaten with twelve consecutive wins in all competitions to the end of January.

At the halfway point of the season (Game Week 19), Manchester City were leading the Premier League with 41 points from 19 games, a point ahead of Manchester United and with a game in hand.

In February and March, City maintained their form to extend their winning run in all competitions to 21 games, a new record for a top flight side in English football. They also matched their previous club record of 28 games unbeaten and broke their own national top flight record by winning fourteen consecutive away games in all competitions. Pep Guardiola went on to record his 200th win when his side defeated West Ham 2–1 at the City of Manchester Stadium. At the time, he had also achieved a higher win percentage managing Manchester City than he had when he managed Barcelona.

On 7 February, City thrashed Liverpool 4–1 on the road to achieve their first victory at Anfield in almost 18 years and only their third win there in 50 games since 1956. Their winning run was ended when City were beaten 2–0 at the City of Manchester Stadium by rivals Manchester United on 7 March. On 16 March, City defeated Borussia Mönchengladbach 2–0 (4–0 on aggregate) and advanced to the Champions League quarter-finals for the fourth year in a row. On 20 March, the Blues scored two late goals to beat Everton on the road and advance to the FA Cup semi-finals for the third consecutive year.

On 29 March, the club announced that Sergio Agüero would be leaving at the end of the season on expiration of his contract. In 10 seasons at City Agüero had become, at the time, the club's all-time leading goalscorer, the fourth highest goalscorer in the history of the Premier League, the goalscorer with the most Premier League goals at a single club (and its leading non-English scorer) and the holder of a plethora of club goal scoring records. At the time he was also City's most decorated player of all time with fifteen league and cup winner medals. He would also be remembered in club and English football history as the winning goalscorer at the denouement of the 2011–12 Premier League season, when City won their first title in 44 years by defeating Queens Park Rangers 3–2, with Agüero scoring in the 94th minute to clinch the title for Manchester City. The Blues finished ahead of closest rivals Manchester United on goal difference.

=== Season run-in ===
In April it was announced that the Carabao Cup final between City and Tottenham Hotspur at Wembley would be a test for the return of spectators to sports events with 8,000 tickets available: the two clubs would be allocated 2,000 tickets each with the remaining 4,000 made available for the residents of Brent and local NHS workers. All attendees would have to consent to mandatory COVID-19 testing before and after the event, travel only by car or on specially chartered trains and coaches from Manchester and provide contact data for track and trace purposes. The match would be the first outdoor sports event with supporters of the teams involved in attendance in the UK in 2021.

City began their April and May season run-in still in contention for an unprecedented quadruple of major English and European titles, a feat they had been close to achieving in three of their previous seven seasons, and which they previously came closest to in the 2018–19 season when the Blues won an also unprecedented domestic treble. On 1 April, they led the league on 74 points, 14 points ahead of Manchester United in second place who had a game in hand.

This lead narrowed to 11 points on Game Week 31 when City suffered a 1–2 home defeat to Leeds United, leaving them requiring at most 11 points from their remaining six fixtures to secure the league title. This defeat occurred between the two legs of City's Champions League quarter-finals against Borussia Dortmund. The first leg at home in Manchester ended as a 2–1 victory to City and Guardiola made seven changes to his team in the Leeds fixture to rest key players for the second leg in Dortmund.

On 14 April, City defeated Borussia Dortmund 2–1 away from home (4–2 on aggregate) and advanced to the Champions League semi-finals for the first time under Pep Guardiola and only second time in their history.

On 17 April, City's hopes for an unprecedented quadruple were tarnished, as the Blues were defeated 1–0 by Chelsea in the FA Cup semi-final at Wembley, the second consecutive time City had been eliminated at this stage.

The following day, 18 April, it was announced that City had joined the proposed European Super League as one of its twelve founder members together with the five other "Big Six" English football clubs. However, the announcement led to widespread condemnation from The Football Association, the Premier League, UEFA and FIFA, as well as from the UK's Conservative government and Prime Minister Boris Johnson. Within 48 hours of the initial announcement on 20 April, City announced that they had withdrawn from the Super League to be followed shortly by the other five English clubs. By the following day, only three of the original founders – Barcelona, Real Madrid and Juventus – remained committed, and it seemed that the proposal had collapsed.

=== End of season ===
On 25 April, City defeated Tottenham Hotspur 1–0 in the League Cup final to lift their first trophy of the season. This victory was the club's fourth consecutive EFL Cup title and their eighth overall, matching the records held by Liverpool. On 4 May, City reached their first ever European Cup / Champions League final by defeating Paris Saint Germain 2–0 (4–1 on aggregate) in the semi-finals. They would face Chelsea in the final, making it the third all-English final in the competition's history.

On 11 May, City were officially crowned Premier League champions, clinching their third title in four seasons and their fifth in ten seasons. The Blues previously failed to complete their league victory on the previous weekend, when they fielded a team with eight changes from the second leg of the Champions League semi-finals and were beaten 1–2 at home by Chelsea, but second-placed Manchester United's 1–2 home defeat to Leicester City three days later left City ten points ahead with only three games of the season left to play. In the end, they won the league by twelve points from second-placed Manchester United. On 23 May, City completed the league season, beating Everton 5–0 in front of 10,000 spectators at the City of Manchester Stadium. This would be the club's only home game in front of fans that season. This was also Sergio Agüero's final home game in City colours, an occasion he marked by coming off the bench in the 65th minute and scoring two goals, mirroring his debut performance against Swansea in August 2011 and also breaking Wayne Rooney's record for most Premier League goals at a single club (184).

On 29 May, City were defeated 0–1 by Chelsea in the Champions League final in an anti-climactic performance. Kevin De Bruyne was brutally injured by Antonio Rüdiger in the second half, and N'Golo Kanté's brilliant performance limited City's attacking options. Guardiola's decision not to start a holding midfielder was also criticized as one of the reasons behind City's defeat. Still, City's European breakthrough signified their most successful season to date and Pep Guardiola showed his pride in the runners-up medal.

== First-team squad ==
N	Pos.	Nat.	Name	Age	Since	App	Goals	Ends	Transfer fee	Notes
2	DF	(England)	Kyle Walker	31	2017	184	5	2024	£45m	
3	DF	(Portugal)	Rúben Dias	24	2020	50	1	2026	£62.1m	
5	DF	(England)	John Stones	27	2016	168	10	2022	£47.5m	
6	DF	(Netherlands)	Nathan Aké	26	2020	13	1	2025	£40m	
7	FW	(England)	Raheem Sterling	26	2015	292	114	2023	£44m	Second vice captain
8	MF	(Germany)	İlkay Gündoğan	30	2016	210	39	2023	£20m	Third vice captain
9	FW	(Brazil)	Gabriel Jesus	24	2017	195	82	2023	£27m	
10	FW	(Argentina)	Sergio Agüero	32	2011	390	260	2021	£31.5m	All-time top goalscorer
11	MF	(Ukraine)	Oleksandr Zinchenko	29	2016	100	2	2024	£1.7m	
13	GK	(United States)	Zack Steffen	26	2019	12	0	2023	£7m	
14	DF	(Spain)	Aymeric Laporte	27	2018	111	8	2025	£57m	
16	MF	(Spain)	Rodri	24	2019	105	6	2025	£62.8m	Record signing
17	MF	(Belgium)	Kevin De Bruyne	29	2015	262	67	2025	£54.5m	Vice captain
20	MF	(Portugal)	Bernardo Silva	26	2017	201	35	2025	£43.5m	
21	FW	(Spain)	Ferran Torres	21	2020	36	13	2025	£20.75m	
22	DF	(France)	Benjamin Mendy	26	2017	73	2	2022	£52m	
25	MF	(Brazil)	Fernandinho	36	2013	350	24	2021	£30m	Captain
26	FW	(Algeria)	Riyad Mahrez	30	2018	142	39	2023	£60m	
27	DF	(Portugal)	João Cancelo	27	2019	76	4	2025	£60m	
31	GK	(Brazil)	Ederson	27	2017	192	0	2025	£34.9m	
33	GK	(England)	Scott Carson	35	2020	1	0	2021	Loan	On loan from Derby County
34	DF	(Netherlands)	Philippe Sandler	24	2018	2	0	2022	£2.6m	
47	MF	(England)	Phil Foden	21	2017	124	31	2024	Youth system	Academy graduate
50	DF	(Spain)	Eric García	20	2018	35	0	2021	£1.45m	Academy graduate

Updated to match played 29 May 2021
Source: Manchester City
Ordered by squad number.
Appearances include league and cup appearances, including as substitute.
Ages are stated as of the end of the 2020–21 season (29 May 2021).

== Transfers ==
=== Transfers in ===
Date	Position	No.	Name	From	Fee	Team	Ref.
1 July 2020	AM	—	(Scotland) Josh Adam	(Scotland) Celtic	Undisclosed	Academy	
1 July 2020	DF	—	(Brazil) Yan Couto	(Brazil) Coritiba	Undisclosed	Academy	
1 July 2020	DF	90	(Belgium) Roméo Lavia	(Belgium) Anderlecht	Undisclosed	Academy	
1 July 2020	DF	—	(Spain) Juan Larios	(Spain) Barcelona	£400,000	Academy	
1 July 2020	GK	—	(Netherlands) Mikki van Sas	(Netherlands) Utrecht	Undisclosed	Academy	
27 July 2020	FW	—	(Spain) Pablo Moreno	(Italy) Juventus	£9,000,000	Academy	
29 July 2020	DF	—	(Burkina Faso) Issa Kaboré	(Belgium) Mechelen	Undisclosed	Academy	
4 August 2020	FW	21	(Spain) Ferran Torres	(Spain) Valencia	£20,750,000	First team	
5 August 2020	DF	6	(Netherlands) Nathan Aké	Bournemouth	£40,000,000	First team	
29 September 2020	DF	3	(Portugal) Rúben Dias	(Portugal) Benfica	£62,100,000	First team	
29 September 2020	FW	—	(Scotland) Adedire Mebude	(Scotland) Rangers	Undisclosed	Academy	
4 October 2020	FW	—	(Argentina) Nahuel Bustos	(Argentina) CA Talleres	£6,030,000	Academy	
12 October 2020	MF	—	(Brazil) Diego Rosa	(Brazil) Grêmio	£5,200,000	Academy	
1 January 2021	FW	—	(Serbia) Filip Stevanović	(Serbia) Partizan	£6,000,000	Academy	
Total					£143,542,100		

=== Transfers out ===
Date	Position	No.	Name	To	Fee	Team	Ref.
1 July 2020	MF	—	(Ghana) Ernest Agyiri	(Estonia) FCI Levadia	Released	Academy	
1 July 2020	DF	—	(Ghana) Collins Tanor	(Georgia (country)) FC Shukura	Released	Academy	
1 July 2020	CF	68	(France) Thierry Ambrose	(France) Metz	£1,800,000	Academy	
1 July 2020	MF	—	(England) Joe Snowdon	Leeds United	Undisclosed	Academy	
3 July 2020	MF	19	(Germany) Leroy Sané	(Germany) Bayern Munich	£54,800,000	First team	
28 July 2020	CM	60	(Nigeria) Fisayo Dele-Bashiru	Sheffield Wednesday	Undisclosed	Academy	
12 August 2020	CB	—	(England) Leojo Davidson	Sheffield Wednesday	Free transfer	Academy	
15 August 2020	GK	1	(Chile) Claudio Bravo	(Spain) Real Betis	Free	First team	
15 August 2020	MF	21	(Spain) David Silva	(Spain) Real Sociedad	Free	First team	
31 August 2020	DF	—	(England) Fedel Ross-Lang	Southampton	Undisclosed	Academy	
1 September 2020	FW	—	(Portugal) Félix Correia	(Italy) Juventus	£9,500,000	Academy	
3 September 2020	MF	67	(Spain) Paolo Fernandes	(Spain) Castellón	Undisclosed	Academy	
11 September 2020	CF	—	(England) Charlie McNeill	Manchester United	£750,000	Academy	
23 September 2020	FW	51	(Morocco) Nabil Touaizi	(Spain) Espanyol	Undisclosed	Academy	
24 September 2020	LW	—	(England) Jamie Bynoe-Gittens	(Germany) Borussia Dortmund	Undisclosed	Academy	
28 September 2020	GK	—	(England) Felix Goddard	Blackburn Rovers	Undisclosed	Academy	
29 September 2020	DF	30	(Argentina) Nicolás Otamendi	(Portugal) Benfica	£13,700,000	First Team	
5 October 2020	MF	75	(Spain) Aleix García	(Romania) Dinamo București	Undisclosed	Academy	
5 October 2020	DF	24	(England) Tosin Adarabioyo	Fulham	Undisclosed	Academy	
16 October 2020	DF	46	(England) Joel Latibeaudiere	(Wales) Swansea City	Undisclosed	Academy	
20 January 2021	MF	—	(United States) Mix Diskerud	(Turkey) Denizlispor	Undisclosed	Academy	
25 January 2021	DF	62	(England) Nathanael Ogbeta	Shrewsbury Town	Undisclosed	Academy	
25 January 2021	GK	58	(England) Tom Scott	Port Vale	Free transfer	Academy	
1 February 2021	CF	63	(England) Keyendrah Simmonds	Birmingham City	Undisclosed	Academy	
1 February 2021	MF	76	(England) D'Margio Wright-Phillips	Stoke City	Undisclosed	Academy	
12 February 2021	DF	12	(Spain) Angeliño	(Germany) RB Leipzig	£16,300,000	First team	
Total					£96,850,000		

=== Loans in ===
Date	Loan ends	Position	No.	Name	From	Team	Ref.
19 August 2020	30 June 2021	GK	33	(England) Scott Carson	Derby County	First team	

=== Loans out ===
Date	Loan ends	Position	No.	Name	To	Team	Ref.
14 June 2020	31 December 2020	MF	—	(United States) Mix Diskerud	(Sweden) Helsingsborgs	Academy	
24 July 2020	30 June 2021	DF	—	(Japan) Kō Itakura	(Netherlands) Groningen	Academy	
28 July 2020	30 June 2021	MF	74	(England) Luke Bolton	(Scotland) Dundee United	Academy	
29 July 2020	30 June 2021	DF	—	(Burkina Faso) Issa Kaboré	(Belgium) Mechelen	Academy	
7 August 2020	26 January 2021 (Note: Arzani's planned season long loan to Utrecht was terminated early by mutual consent on 26 January 2021 and he was subsequently loaned to AGF.)	MF	—	(Australia) Daniel Arzani	(Netherlands) Utrecht	Academy	
10 August 2020	30 June 2021	FW	38	(England) Jack Harrison	Leeds United	Academy	
14 August 2020	30 June 2021	MF	66	(Spain) Iker Pozo	(Netherlands) FC Eindhoven	Academy	
15 August 2020	30 June 2021	DF	—	(Venezuela) Nahuel Ferraresi	(Portugal) Moreirense	Academy	
16 August 2020	30 June 2022	DF	—	(Spain) Pedro Porro	(Portugal) Sporting CP	Academy	
20 August 2020	30 June 2021	MF	71	(Scotland) Lewis Fiorini	(Netherlands) NAC Breda	Academy	
20 August 2020	30 June 2021	FW	43	(Germany) Lukas Nmecha	(Belgium) Anderlecht	Academy	
25 August 2020	30 June 2021	GK	55	(Republic of Ireland) Gavin Bazunu	Rochdale	Academy	
29 August 2020	30 June 2021	DF	—	(United States) Erik Palmer-Brown	Austria Wien	Academy	
30 August 2020	30 June 2021	MF	—	(Venezuela) Yangel Herrera	(Spain) Granada	Academy	
31 August 2020	1 February 2021 (Note: Palaversa's planned season long loan to Getafe was terminated early by mutual consent on 1 February 2021 and he was subsequently loaned to KV Kortrijk.)	MF	—	(Croatia) Ante Palaversa	(Spain) Getafe	Academy	
1 September 2020	30 June 2021	FW	—	(Serbia) Slobodan Tedić	(Netherlands) PEC Zwolle	Academy	
1 September 2020	30 June 2022	MF	—	(Japan) Ryōtarō Meshino	(Portugal) Rio Ave	Academy	
7 September 2020	19 October 2020 (Note: Amankwah's planned season long loan to Rochdale was terminated early due to injury on 19 October 2020.)	DF	57	(England) Yeboah Amankwah	Rochdale	Academy	
8 September 2020	13 February 2021 (Note: Angeliño's loan to Leipzig included an option to make the transfer permanent. Leipzig activated this option on 13 February 2021.)	DF	12	(Spain) Angeliño	(Germany) RB Leipzig	First team	
9 September 2020	30 June 2021	MF	—	(Serbia) Ivan Ilić	(Italy) Hellas Verona	Academy	
18 September 2020	30 June 2021	MF	—	(Spain) Pablo Moreno	(Spain) Girona	Academy	
18 September 2020	1 February 2021 (Note: Muric's planned season long loan to Girona was terminated early by mutual consent on 1 February 2021 and he was subsequently loaned to Willem II.)	GK	49	(Kosovo) Arijanet Muric	(Spain) Girona	First team	
19 September 2020	31 January 2021	GK	70	(England) Louie Moulden	Gloucester City	Academy	
25 September 2020	30 June 2021	DF	—	(Brazil) Yan Couto	(Spain) Girona	Academy	
27 September 2020	30 June 2021	FW	29	(Colombia) Marlos Moreno	(Belgium) Lommel	Academy	
5 October 2020	30 June 2021	FW	—	(Argentina) Nahuel Bustos	(Spain) Girona	Academy	
5 October 2020	30 June 2021	MF	—	(Serbia) Luka Ilić	(Netherlands) Twente	Academy	
5 October 2020	30 June 2021	GK	32	(England) Daniel Grimshaw	(Belgium) Lommel	Academy	
6 October 2020	30 June 2021	MF	—	(Ghana) Aminu Mohammed	(Belgium) Lommel	Academy	
6 October 2020	30 June 2021	FW	—	(Ghana) Thomas Agyepong	(Belgium) Lommel	Academy	
12 October 2020	1 February 2021 (Note: Roberts' planned season long loan to Middlesbrough was terminated early by mutual consent on 1 February 2021 and he was subsequently loaned to Derby County.)	MF	—	(England) Patrick Roberts	Middlesbrough	First team	
12 October 2020	30 June 2022	MF	—	(Brazil) Diego Rosa	(Belgium) Lommel	Academy	
16 October 2020	30 June 2021	MF	65	(Wales) Matthew Smith	Doncaster Rovers	Academy	
1 January 2021	30 June 2021	FW	—	(Serbia) Filip Stevanović	(Serbia) Partiszan	Academy	
4 January 2021	30 June 2021	FW	72	(England) Morgan Rogers	Lincoln City	Academy	
26 January 2021	30 June 2021	MF	—	(Australia) Daniel Arzani	(Denmark) AGF	Academy	
1 February 2021	30 June 2021	WG	73	(Netherlands) Jayden Braaf	(Italy) Udinese	Academy	
1 February 2021	30 June 2021	DF	78	(England) Taylor Harwood-Bellis	Blackburn Rovers	Academy	
1 February 2021	30 June 2021	GK	49	(Kosovo) Arijanet Muric	(Netherlands) Willem II	First team	
1 February 2021	30 June 2021	MF	—	(England) Patrick Roberts	Derby County	First team	
1 February 2021	30 June 2021	DF	59	(England) Camron Gbadebo	AFC Fylde	Academy	
1 February 2021	30 June 2021	MF	—	(Croatia) Ante Palaversa	(Belgium) KV Kortrijk	Academy	
10 February 2021	30 June 2021	MF	54	(Republic of Ireland) Joe Hodge	(Republic of Ireland) Derry City	Academy	

== Competitions ==
=== Overview ===
Competition	First match	Last match	Starting round	Final position	Record							
Competition	First match	Last match	Starting round	Final position	Pld	W	D	L	GF	GA	GD	Win %
Premier League	21 September 2020	23 May 2021	Matchday 1	Winners	38	27	5	6	83	32	+51	71.05
FA Cup	10 January 2021	17 April 2021	Third round	Semi-finals	5	4	0	1	11	3	+8	80.00
EFL Cup	24 September 2020	25 April 2021	Third round	Winners	5	5	0	0	12	2	+10	100.00
UEFA Champions League	21 October 2020	29 May 2021	Group stage	Runners-up	13	11	1	1	25	5	+20	84.62
Total					61	47	6	8	131	42	+89	77.05

Source: Soccerway

=== Premier League ===
==== League table ====
Pos	Team	Pld	W	D	L	GF	GA	GD	Pts	Qualification or relegation
1	Manchester City (C)	38	27	5	6	83	32	+51	86	Qualification for the Champions League group stage
2	Manchester United	38	21	11	6	73	44	+29	74	Qualification for the Champions League group stage
3	Liverpool	38	20	9	9	68	42	+26	69	Qualification for the Champions League group stage
4	Chelsea	38	19	10	9	58	36	+22	67	Qualification for the Champions League group stage
5	Leicester City	38	20	6	12	68	50	+18	66	Qualification for the Europa League group stage (Note: Since the winners of the 2020–21 FA Cup, Leicester City, also qualified for the Europa League based on league position, the second Europa League group stage berth allocated to England was transferred to the sixth-placed team.)

Source: Premier League
Rules for classification: 1) Points; 2) Goal difference; 3) Goals scored; 4) If the champions, relegated teams or qualified teams for UEFA competitions cannot be determined by rules 1 to 3, rules 4.1 to 4.3 are applied – 4.1) Points gained in head-to-head record between such teams; 4.2) Away goals scored in head-to-head record between such teams; 4.3) Play-offs
(C) Champions

==== Results summary ====
Overall								Home						Away					
Pld	W	D	L	GF	GA	GD	Pts	W	D	L	GF	GA	GD	W	D	L	GF	GA	GD
38	27	5	6	83	32	+51	86	13	2	4	43	17	+26	14	3	2	40	15	+25

Source: Premier League

==== Results by matchday ====
Game Week	1	2	3	4	5	6	7	8	9	10	11	12	13	14	15	16	17	18	19	20	21	22	23	24	25	26	27	28	29	30	31	32	33	34	35	36	37	38
Ground	H (Note: GW1 vs Villa postponed until GW19)	A	H	A	H	A	A	H	A	H	H	A	H	A	H	A (Note: GW16 vs Everton postponed until GW24)	A	H	H	A	H	A	A	H	A	H	H	A	H (Note: GW29 vs Wolves brought forward to GW26)	A	H	A	H (Note: GW33 vs Southampton brought forward to GW27)	A	H	A	A	H
Result	W	W	L	D	W	D	W	D	L	W	W	D	D	W	W	W	W	W	W	W	W	W	W	W	W	W	L	W	W	W	L	W	W	W	L	W	L	W
Position	9	7	13	14	11	13	10	10	13	11	7	9	9	8	6	8	5	3	2 (Note: Position before and after rearranged GW1 fixture)	1	1	1	1	1 (Note: Position before and after rearranged GW16 fixture)	1	1 (Note: Position before and after rearranged GW29 fixture)	1 (Note: Position before and after rearranged GW33 fixture)	1	1	1	1	1	1	1	1	1	1	1

Source: Premier League
A = Away; H = Home; W = Win; D = Draw; L = Loss
Notes: Positions show the situation at the end of the corresponding Game Weeks (GW), not the position at the conclusion of matches or game days.

==== Matches ====
The league fixtures were announced on 20 August 2020. The 2020–21 season officially began on 12 September 2020. However, clubs who had participated in the latter rearranged knockout rounds of the previous season's Champions League and Europa League competitions in August 2020 were allowed a further week to rest and prepare their squads for the new season. City's match at home against Aston Villa, originally scheduled for gameweek 1, was therefore postponed until later in the season, and City instead started their campaign on the following Monday night away to Wolverhampton Wanderers. The Aston Villa home fixture was eventually rearranged for 20 January 2021.

On 28 December 2020, City's away game at Everton was postponed four hours before kick off following a Premier League Board meeting. Manchester City lodged a request with the Premier League to rearrange the fixture following an increase in positive SARS-CoV-2 test results received by the club earlier the same day, on top of four positive cases reported on Christmas Day for two non-playing staff, Kyle Walker and Gabriel Jesus. The Board agreed to rearrange the game as a safety precaution. The match was subsequently rescheduled for 17 February 2021.

Note: Match numbers indicated on the left hand side are references to the Game Weeks (GW) scheduled by the Premier League, and not the order in which matches were played after postponements and schedule alterations.

21 September 2020 2	Wolverhampton Wanderers	1–3	Manchester City	Wolverhampton
20:15 BST (UTC+1)	Jiménez 78'	Report	De Bruyne 20' (pen.); Foden 32'; Gabriel Jesus (yellow card) 35', (goal) 90+5'; Mendy (yellow card) 35'; Rodri (yellow card) 86'	Stadium: Molineux; Attendance: 0 Referee: Andre Marriner

27 September 2020 3	Manchester City	2–5	Leicester City	Manchester
16:30 BST (UTC+1)	Mahrez 4'; Aké (yellow card) 61', (goal) 84'	Report	Tielemans (yellow card) 22', (goal) 88' (pen.); Vardy 37' (pen.), 54', 58' (pen.); Söyüncü (yellow card) 47'; Amartey (yellow card) 51'; Maddison 77'	Stadium: City of Manchester Stadium; Attendance: 0 Referee: Michael Oliver

3 October 2020 4	Leeds United	1–1	Manchester City	Leeds
17:30 BST (UTC+1)	Bamford (yellow card) 12'; Rodrigo 59'; Dallas (yellow card) 90+2'	Report	Sterling 17'; Mendy (yellow card) 36'	Stadium: Elland Road; Attendance: 0 Referee: Mike Dean

17 October 2020 5	Manchester City	1–0	Arsenal	Manchester
17:30 BST (UTC+1)	Rodri (yellow card) 14'; Sterling 23'; Cancelo (yellow card) 63'; Dias (yellow card) 68'; Aké (yellow card) 84'	Report	Partey (yellow card) 90+4'	Stadium: City of Manchester Stadium; Attendance: 0 Referee: Chris Kavanagh

24 October 2020 6	West Ham United	1–1	Manchester City	Stratford
12:30 BST (UTC+1)	Antonio 18'; Coufal (yellow card) 51'; Balbuena (yellow card) 90+2'	Report	Foden 51'	Stadium: London Stadium; Attendance: 0 Referee: Anthony Taylor

31 October 2020 7	Sheffield United	0–1	Manchester City	Sheffield
12:30 GMT (UTC±0)		Report	Walker 28'	Stadium: Bramall Lane; Attendance: 0 Referee: Michael Oliver

8 November 2020 8	Manchester City	1–1	Liverpool	Manchester
16:30 GMT (UTC±0)	Gabriel Jesus 31'; De Bruyne (penalty missed) 42'; Sterling (yellow card) 61'; Laporte (yellow card) 79'; Walker (yellow card) 90+3'	Report	Salah 13' (pen.); Matip (yellow card) 46'	Stadium: City of Manchester Stadium; Attendance: 0 Referee: Craig Pawson

21 November 2020 9	Tottenham Hotspur	2–0	Manchester City	Tottenham
17:30 GMT (UTC±0)	Son 5'; Sissoko (yellow card) 42'; Lo Celso 65'; Kane (yellow card) 90'	Report	Dias (yellow card) 87'; Torres (yellow card) 88'	Stadium: Tottenham Hotspur Stadium; Attendance: 0 Referee: Mike Dean

28 November 2020 10	Manchester City	5–0	Burnley	Manchester
15:00 GMT (UTC±0)	Mahrez 6', 22', 69'; Mendy 41'; Torres 66'	Report		Stadium: City of Manchester Stadium; Attendance: 0 Referee: Lee Mason

5 December 2020 11	Manchester City	2–0	Fulham	Manchester
15:00 GMT (UTC±0)	Sterling 5'; De Bruyne 26' (pen.)	Report		Stadium: City of Manchester Stadium; Attendance: 0 Referee: Jon Moss

12 December 2020 12	Manchester United	0–0	Manchester City	Trafford
17:30 GMT (UTC±0)	Maguire (yellow card) 79'	Report	Fernandinho (yellow card) 87'	Stadium: Old Trafford; Attendance: 0 Referee: Chris Kavanagh

15 December 2020 13	Manchester City	1–1	West Bromwich Albion	Manchester
20:00 GMT (UTC±0)	Gündoğan 30'; Cancelo (yellow card) 45+2'; Aké (yellow card) 90+4'	Report	Gallagher (yellow card) 40'; Dias 43' (o.g.); Peltier (yellow card) 90'; Sawyers (yellow card) 90+2'	Stadium: City of Manchester Stadium; Attendance: 0 Referee: Peter Bankes

19 December 2020 14	Southampton	0–1	Manchester City	Southampton
15:00 GMT (UTC±0)	Romeu (yellow card) 38'; Ward-Prowse (yellow card) 42'	Report	Sterling 16'; De Bruyne (yellow card) 25'; Ederson (yellow card) 81'	Stadium: St Mary's Stadium; Attendance: 2,000; Referee: Mike Dean

26 December 2020 15	Manchester City	2–0	Newcastle United	Manchester
20:00 GMT (UTC±0)	Gündoğan 14'; Rodri (yellow card) 34'; Torres 55'; Cancelo (yellow card) 88'	Report	Ritchie (yellow card) 64'; Schär (yellow card) 80'	Stadium: City of Manchester Stadium; Attendance: 0 Referee: Andre Marriner

3 January 2021 17	Chelsea	1–3	Manchester City	London
16:30 GMT (UTC±0)	Pulisic (yellow card) 45+1'; Kanté (yellow card) 53'; Kovačić (yellow card) 71'; Hudson-Odoi 90+2'	Report	Gündoğan 18'; Foden 21'; De Bruyne 34'; Silva (yellow card) 90'	Stadium: Stamford Bridge; Attendance: 0 Referee: Anthony Taylor

13 January 2021 18	Manchester City	1–0	Brighton & Hove Albion	Manchester
18:00 GMT (UTC±0)	Foden 44'; Sterling (penalty missed) 90+2'	Report	Veltman (yellow card) 62'; Webster (yellow card) 77'	Stadium: City of Manchester Stadium; Attendance: 0 Referee: Darren England

17 January 2021 19	Manchester City	4–0	Crystal Palace	Manchester
19:15 GMT (UTC±0)	Stones 26', 68'; Gündoğan 56'; Sterling 88'	Report		Stadium: City of Manchester Stadium; Attendance: 0 Referee: Lee Mason

20 January 2021 1	Manchester City	2–0	Aston Villa	Manchester
18:00 GMT (UTC±0)	Silva 79'; Gündoğan 90' (pen.)	Report	McGinn (yellow card) 67'; Taylor (yellow card) 86'	Stadium: City of Manchester Stadium; Attendance: 0 Referee: Jon Moss
Note: The match was originally scheduled for the first gameweek, but was postponed to accommodate an additional week of rest due to Manchester City's involvement in the postponed 2019–20 UEFA Champions League knockout phase, which was held in mid-August.

26 January 2021 20	West Bromwich Albion	0–5	Manchester City	West Bromwich
20:15 GMT (UTC±0)	Robson-Kanu (yellow card) 84'; O'Shea (yellow card) 90+2'	Report	Gündoğan 6', 30'; Cancelo 20'; Mahrez 45+2'; Sterling 57'	Stadium: The Hawthorns; Attendance: 0 Referee: Chris Kavanagh

30 January 2021 21	Manchester City	1–0	Sheffield United	Manchester
15:00 GMT (UTC±0)	Gabriel Jesus 9'	Report	Norwood (yellow card) 24'; Baldock (yellow card) 82'; Egan (yellow card) 84'	Stadium: City of Manchester Stadium; Attendance: 0 Referee: David Coote

3 February 2021 22	Burnley	0–2	Manchester City	Burnley
18:00 GMT (UTC±0)	Stephens (yellow card) 83'; Mumbongo (yellow card) 87'	Report	Gabriel Jesus 3'; Sterling 38'; Ederson (yellow card) 76'	Stadium: Turf Moor; Attendance: 0 Referee: Martin Atkinson

7 February 2021 23	Liverpool	1–4	Manchester City	Liverpool
16:30 GMT (UTC±0)	Thiago (yellow card) 3'; Salah 63' (pen.); Fabinho (yellow card) 70'	Report	Gündoğan (penalty missed) 37', 49', 73'; Dias (yellow card) 62'; Sterling 76'; Foden 83'	Stadium: Anfield; Attendance: 0 Referee: Michael Oliver

13 February 2021 24	Manchester City	3–0	Tottenham Hotspur	Manchester
17:30 GMT (UTC±0)	Rodri 23' (pen.); Silva (yellow card) 29'; Gündoğan 50', 66'	Report	Lamela (yellow card) 65'; Dier (yellow card) 77'; Davies (yellow card) 90+2'	Stadium: City of Manchester Stadium; Attendance: 0 Referee: Paul Tierney

17 February 2021 16	Everton	1–3	Manchester City	Liverpool
20:15 GMT (UTC±0)	Doucouré (yellow card) 28'; Richarlison 37', (yellow card) 45'	Report	Foden 32'; Mahrez 63'; Sterling (yellow card) 67'; Silva 77'	Stadium: Goodison Park; Attendance: 0 Referee: Andre Marriner
Note: The match was originally scheduled for 28 December 2020 (GW 16), but was postponed due to safety concerns following a COVID-19 outbreak at Manchester City.

21 February 2021 25	Arsenal	0–1	Manchester City	Holloway
16:30 GMT (UTC±0)	Xhaka (yellow card) 53'; Bellerín (yellow card) 87'	Report	Sterling 2'; Silva (yellow card) 51'; Cancelo (yellow card) 64'	Stadium: Emirates Stadium; Attendance: 0 Referee: Jon Moss

27 February 2021 26	Manchester City	2–1	West Ham United	Manchester
12:30 GMT (UTC±0)	Dias 30'; Stones 68'; Fernandinho (yellow card) 90+3'	Report	Johnson (yellow card) 28'; Antonio 43'	Stadium: City of Manchester Stadium; Attendance: 0 Referee: Michael Oliver

2 March 2021 29	Manchester City	4–1	Wolverhampton Wanderers	Manchester
20:00 GMT (UTC±0)	Dendoncker 15' (o.g.); Gabriel Jesus 80', 90+3'; Mahrez 90'	Report	Coady 61'; Neto (yellow card) 71'	Stadium: City of Manchester Stadium; Attendance: 0 Referee: Chris Kavanagh
Note: The match was originally scheduled for 20 March 2021 (GW 29), but was brought forward due to the fixture clashing with Manchester City's participation in the FA Cup quarter-finals.

7 March 2021 27	Manchester City	0–2	Manchester United	Manchester
16:30 GMT (UTC±0)		Report	Fernandes 2' (pen.); Maguire (yellow card) 32'; Shaw 50', (yellow card) 58'; Henderson (yellow card) 60'	Stadium: City of Manchester Stadium; Attendance: 0 Referee: Anthony Taylor

10 March 2021 33	Manchester City	5–2	Southampton	Manchester
18:00 GMT (UTC±0)	De Bruyne 15', 59'; Mahrez 40', 55'; Gündoğan 45+3'; Fernandinho (yellow card) 83'	Report	Ward-Prowse 25' (pen.); Adams 56'	Stadium: City of Manchester Stadium; Attendance: 0 Referee: Jon Moss
Note: The match was originally scheduled for 24 April 2021 (GW33), but was brought forward due to the fixture clashing with Manchester City's participation in the EFL Cup final.

13 March 2021 28	Fulham	0–3	Manchester City	Fulham
20:00 GMT (UTC±0)		Report	Stones 47'; Gabriel Jesus 56'; Agüero 60' (pen.)	Stadium: Craven Cottage; Attendance: 0 Referee: Andre Marriner

3 April 2021 30	Leicester City	0–2	Manchester City	Leicester
17:30 BST (UTC+1)	Ndidi (yellow card) 32'; Amartey (yellow card) 87'	Report	Mendy 58'; Ederson (yellow card) 73'; Gabriel Jesus 74'; Fernandinho (yellow card) 82'; Rodri (yellow card) 90'	Stadium: King Power Stadium; Attendance: 0 Referee: Anthony Taylor

10 April 2021 31	Manchester City	1–2	Leeds United	Manchester
12:30 BST (UTC+1)	Aké (yellow card) 35'; Torres 76'; Silva (yellow card) 83'; Fernandinho (yellow card) 90+3'	Report	Dallas 42', 90+1'; Cooper (red card) 45+1'; Alioski (yellow card) 66'	Stadium: City of Manchester Stadium; Attendance: 0 Referee: Andre Marriner

21 April 2021 32	Aston Villa	1–2	Manchester City	Birmingham
20:15 BST (UTC+1)	McGinn 1'; Cash (yellow card) 54' (yellow-red card) 57'	Report	Foden 22'; Rodri 40'; Stones (red card) 44'; Gündoğan (yellow card) 44'	Stadium: Villa Park; Attendance: 0 Referee: Peter Bankes

1 May 2021 34	Crystal Palace	0–2	Manchester City	Selhurst
12:30 BST (UTC+1)	Milivojević (yellow card) 49'; Kouyaté (yellow card) 81'	Report	Agüero 57'; Torres 59'	Stadium: Selhurst Park; Attendance: 0 Referee: David Coote

8 May 2021 35	Manchester City	1–2	Chelsea	Manchester
17:30 BST (UTC+1)	Sterling (yellow card) 12', (goal) 44'; Agüero (penalty missed) 45+3'; Gabriel Jesus (yellow card) 90'	Report	Ziyech 63'; Alonso 90+2'	Stadium: City of Manchester Stadium; Attendance: 0 Referee: Anthony Taylor

14 May 2021 36	Newcastle United	3–4	Manchester City	Newcastle upon Tyne
20:00 BST (UTC+1)	Krafth 25'; Ritchie (yellow card) 36'; Joelinton 45+6' (pen.); Shelvey (yellow card) 59'; Willock (penalty missed) 61', 62'	Report	Cancelo 39', (yellow card) 56'; Torres 42', 64', 66'; Rodri (yellow card) 44'	Stadium: St James' Park; Attendance: 0 Referee: Kevin Friend

18 May 2021 37	Brighton & Hove Albion	3–2	Manchester City	Falmer
19:00 BST (UTC+1)	Jahanbakhsh (yellow card) 27'; Trossard 50'; Webster 72', (yellow card) 90+3'; Burn 76'; Sánchez (yellow card) 90+5'	Report	Gündoğan 2'; Cancelo (red card) 10'; Foden 48'; Silva (yellow card) 73'; Rodri (yellow card) 79'; Fernandinho (yellow card) 82'	Stadium: Falmer Stadium; Attendance: 7,945; Referee: Stuart Attwell

23 May 2021 38	Manchester City	5–0	Everton	Manchester
16:00 BST (UTC+1)	De Bruyne 11'; Gabriel Jesus 14'; Dias (yellow card) 35'; Foden 53'; Sterling (yellow card) 68'; Agüero 71', 76'	Report	Richarlison (yellow card) 7'; Holgate (yellow card) 22'; Sigurðsson (penalty missed) 36'	Stadium: City of Manchester Stadium; Attendance: 10,000; Referee: Michael Oliver

=== FA Cup ===
The draw for the third round was held on 30 November 2020 by Robbie Savage and shown live on BBC One. The draws for the fourth and fifth round were both made on 11 January, conducted by Peter Crouch. The draw for the quarter-finals was held on 11 February 2021 and conducted by Karen Carney. The draw for the semi-finals was made, live on BBC One, by Dion Dublin on 21 March 2021.

10 January 2021 Third round	Manchester City	3–0	Birmingham City	Manchester
13:30 GMT (UTC±0)	Silva 8', 15'; Foden 33'; Walker (yellow card) 74'	Report	Šunjić (yellow card) 44'; Clarke-Salter (yellow card) 88'	Stadium: City of Manchester Stadium; Attendance: 0 Referee: Robert Jones

23 January 2021 Fourth round	Cheltenham Town	1–3	Manchester City	Cheltenham
17:30 GMT (UTC±0)	Boyle (yellow card) 24'; Raglan (yellow card) 48'; May 59'; Tozer (yellow card) 85'	Report	Laporte (yellow card) 60'; Foden 81'; Gabriel Jesus 84'; Torres 90+4'	Stadium: Jonny-Rocks Stadium; Attendance: 0 Referee: Stuart Attwell

10 February 2021 Fifth round	Swansea City	1–3	Manchester City	Swansea
17:30 GMT (UTC±0)	Cabango (yellow card) 37'; Dhanda (yellow card) 70'; Whittaker 77'	Report	Walker 30'; Sterling 47'; Gabriel Jesus 50'	Stadium: Liberty Stadium; Attendance: 0 Referee: Peter Bankes

20 March 2021 Quarter-finals	Everton	0–2	Manchester City	Liverpool
17:30 GMT (UTC±0)	Allan (yellow card) 23'; Gomes (yellow card) 75'	Report	Fernandinho (yellow card) 57'; Gündoğan 84'; De Bruyne 90'	Stadium: Goodison Park; Attendance: 0 Referee: Michael Oliver

17 April 2021 Semi-finals	Chelsea	1–0	Manchester City	London
17:30 BST (UTC+1)	James (yellow card) 34'; Ziyech 55'; Azpilicueta (yellow card) 90'	Report	Fernandinho (yellow card) 65'; Laporte (yellow card) 90+2'; Dias (yellow card) 90+5'	Stadium: Wembley Stadium; Attendance: 0 Referee: Mike Dean

=== EFL Cup ===
The draw for both the second and third rounds was confirmed on 6 September, live on Sky Sports by Phil Babb. The fourth round draw was conducted on 17 September 2020 by Laura Woods and Lee Hendrie live on Sky Sports.

24 September 2020 Third round	Manchester City	2–1	Bournemouth	Manchester
19:45 BST	Delap 18', (yellow card) 79'; Foden 75'	Report	Surridge 22'; Zemura (yellow card) 70'; L. Cook (yellow card) 90+2'	Stadium: City of Manchester Stadium; Attendance: 0 Referee: Jon Moss

30 September 2020 Fourth round	Burnley	0–3	Manchester City	Burnley
19:00 BST		Report	Sterling 35', 49', (yellow card) 76'; Torres 65'; Silva (yellow card) 90'	Stadium: Turf Moor; Attendance: 0 Referee: Andrew Madley

22 December 2020 Quarter-finals	Arsenal	1–4	Manchester City	London
20:00 GMT	Elneny (yellow card) 23'; Mustafi (yellow card) 25'; Lacazette 31'	Report	Gabriel Jesus 3'; Mahrez 54'; Foden 59'; Silva (yellow card) 65'; Laporte 73'	Stadium: Emirates Stadium; Attendance: 0 Referee: Stuart Attwell

6 January 2021 Semi-finals	Manchester United	0–2	Manchester City	Manchester
19:45 GMT	Fred (yellow card) 69'; Shaw (yellow card) 90'	Report	Fernandinho (yellow card) 48', (goal) 83'; Stones 50'; Cancelo (yellow card) 78'	Stadium: Old Trafford; Attendance: 0 Referee: Martin Atkinson
Note: For the 2020–21 season, the EFL Cup semi-finals were played over a single leg to reduce fixture congestion caused by the COVID-19 pandemic and the late start to the season.

25 April 2021 Final	Manchester City	1–0	Tottenham Hotspur	London
16:30 BST (UTC+1)	Laporte (yellow card) 45', (goal) 82'; Fernandinho (yellow card) 59'	Report	Reguilón (yellow card) 27'	Stadium: Wembley Stadium; Attendance: 7,773; Referee: Paul Tierney

=== UEFA Champions League ===
==== Group stage ====
The group stage draw was held on 1 October 2020.

Pos	Team	Pld	W	D	L	GF	GA	GD	Pts	Qualification	MCI	POR	OLY	MAR
1	(England) Manchester City	6	5	1	0	13	1	+12	16	Advance to knockout phase	—	3–1	3–0	3–0
2	(Portugal) Porto	6	4	1	1	10	3	+7	13	Advance to knockout phase	0–0	—	2–0	3–0
3	(Greece) Olympiacos	6	1	0	5	2	10	−8	3 (Note: Tied on head-to-head points (3). Head-to-head away goals: Olympiacos 1, Marseille 0.)	Transfer to Europa League	0–1	0–2	—	1–0
4	(France) Marseille	6	1	0	5	2	13	−11	3		0–3	0–2	2–1	—

Source: UEFA
Rules for classification: Group stage tiebreakers
Notes:

21 October 2020 1	Manchester City (England)	3–1	(Portugal) Porto	Manchester, England
20:00 BST (UTC+1)	Agüero 21' (pen.); Walker (yellow card) 28'; Silva (yellow card) 34'; Cancelo (yellow card) 36'; Gündoğan 65'; García (yellow card) 67'; Torres 73'; Fernandinho (yellow card) 90'	Report	Díaz 14'; Pepe (yellow card) 84'	Stadium: City of Manchester Stadium; Attendance: 0 Referee: Andris Treimanis (Latvia)

27 October 2020 2	Marseille (France)	0–3	(England) Manchester City	Marseille, France
21:00 CET (UTC+1)	Amavi (yellow card) 62'; Ćaleta-Car (yellow card) 71'	Report	Torres 18'; Laporte (yellow card) 59'; Gündoğan 76'; Sterling 81'	Stadium: Stade Vélodrome; Attendance: 0 Referee: Tobias Stieler (Germany)

3 November 2020 3	Manchester City (England)	3–0	(Greece) Olympiacos	Manchester, England
21:00 CET (UTC+1)	Torres 12'; Gabriel Jesus 81'; Cancelo 90'	Report	Camara (yellow card) 55'	Stadium: City of Manchester Stadium; Attendance: 0 Referee: Carlos del Cerro Grande (Spain)

25 November 2020 4	Olympiacos (Greece)	0–1	(England) Manchester City	Piraeus, Greece
18:55 CET (UTC+1)	Rafinha (yellow card) 39'	Report	Foden 36'; Sterling (yellow card) 39'; Dias (yellow card) 54'; Gündoğan (yellow card) 86'	Stadium: Karaiskakis Stadium; Attendance: 0 Referee: Davide Massa (Italy)

1 December 2020 5	Porto (Portugal)	0–0	(England) Manchester City	Porto, Portugal
21:00 CET (UTC+1)	Marega (yellow card) 68'	Report	Rodri (yellow card) 51'	Stadium: Estádio do Dragão; Attendance: 0 Referee: Björn Kuipers (Netherlands)

9 December 2020 6	Manchester City (England)	3–0	(France) Marseille	Manchester, England
21:00 CET (UTC+1)	Torres 48'; Agüero 77'; Álvaro 90' (o.g.)	Report	Gueye (yellow card) 39'	Stadium: City of Manchester Stadium; Attendance: 0 Referee: Halil Umut Meler (Turkey)

==== Knockout phase ====
===== Round of 16 =====
The draw for the round of 16 was held on 14 December 2020.

24 February 2021 First leg	Borussia Mönchengladbach (Germany)	0–2	(England) Manchester City	Budapest, Hungary
21:00 CET (UTC+1)		Report	Silva 29'; Gabriel Jesus 65'	Stadium: Puskás Aréna; Attendance: 0 Referee: Artur Soares Dias (Portugal)
Note: The match, originally to be played at Borussia-Park in Mönchengladbach, was moved to Puskás Aréna in Budapest due to restrictions imposed by Germany on travelers from the United Kingdom out of concern of the COVID-19 variant B.1.1.7.

16 March 2021 Second leg	Manchester City (England)	2–0 (4–0 agg.)	(Germany) Borussia Mönchengladbach	Budapest, Hungary
20:00 GMT (UTC±0)	De Bruyne 12'; Gündoğan 18'; Cancelo (yellow card) 55'; Fernandinho (yellow card) 82'	Report	Lainer (yellow card) 61'	Stadium: Puskás Aréna; Attendance: 0 Referee: Sergei Karasev (Russia)
Note: The match, originally to be played at the City of Manchester Stadium in Manchester, was moved to Puskás Aréna in Budapest due to restrictions imposed by Germany on travelers from the United Kingdom out of concern of the COVID-19 variant B.1.1.7.

===== Quarter-finals =====
The draw for the quarter-finals was held on 19 March 2021.

6 April 2021 First leg	Manchester City (England)	2–1	(Germany) Borussia Dortmund	Manchester, England
20:00 BST (UTC+1)	De Bruyne 19'; Foden 90'	Report	Can (yellow card) 30'; Bellingham (yellow card) 37'; Reus 84'	Stadium: City of Manchester Stadium; Attendance: 0 Referee: Ovidiu Hațegan (Romania)

14 April 2021 Second leg	Borussia Dortmund (Germany)	1–2 (2–4 agg.)	(England) Manchester City	Dortmund, Germany
21:00 CEST (UTC+2)	Bellingham 15', (yellow card) 39'	Report	Mahrez 55' (pen.); Foden 75'	Stadium: Westfalenstadion; Attendance: 0 Referee: Carlos del Cerro Grande (Spain)

===== Semi-finals =====
The draw for the semi-finals was held on 19 March 2021, after the quarter-finals draw.

28 April 2021 First leg	Paris Saint-Germain (France)	1–2	(England) Manchester City	Paris, France
21:00 CEST (UTC+2)	Marquinhos 15'; Paredes (yellow card) 70'; Neymar (yellow card) 74'; Gueye (red card) 77'	Report	Cancelo (yellow card) 31'; De Bruyne 64', (yellow card) 86'; Mahrez 71'	Stadium: Parc des Princes; Attendance: 0 Referee: Felix Brych (Germany)

4 May 2021 Second leg	Manchester City (England)	2–0 (4–1 agg.)	(France) Paris Saint-Germain	Manchester, England
20:00 BST (UTC+1)	Mahrez 11', 63'; Zinchenko (yellow card) 72'; De Bruyne (yellow card) 74'	Report	Herrera (yellow card) 22'; Di María (red card) 69'; Verratti (yellow card) 71'; Kimpembe (yellow card) 87'; Pereira (yellow card) 89'	Stadium: City of Manchester Stadium; Attendance: 0 Referee: Björn Kuipers (Netherlands)

===== Final =====
29 May 2021 Final	Manchester City (England)	0–1	(England) Chelsea	Porto, Portugal
20:00 WEST PTT (UTC+1)	Gündoğan (yellow card) 35'; Gabriel Jesus (yellow card) 88'	Report	Havertz 42'; Rüdiger (yellow card) 57'	Stadium: Estádio do Dragão; Attendance: 14,110; Referee: Antonio Mateu Lahoz (Spain)
Note: The final was originally scheduled to be played at the Atatürk Olympic Stadium in Istanbul. However, on 12 May, UEFA announced it had been moved to Portugal since the high level of COVID-19 infection rates in Turkey had led the UK government to place travel to Turkey on its red list, meaning fans would have had to quarantine for ten days in a hotel at their expense after their return. Portugal at the same time was on the green list, which meant no travel restrictions at either end for those attending the final.

== Statistics ==
As of 29 May 2021

Appearances (Apps) numbers are for appearances in competitive games only, including sub appearances.
Red card numbers denote: numbers in parentheses represent red cards overturned for wrongful dismissal.
Source for all stats:

No.	Player	Pos.	Premier League				FA Cup				EFL Cup				Champions League				Total			
No.	Player	Pos.	Apps	Goal	Yellow card	Red card	Apps	Goal	Yellow card	Red card	Apps	Goal	Yellow card	Red card	Apps	Goal	Yellow card	Red card	Apps	Goal	Yellow card	Red card
2	(England) Kyle Walker	DF	24	1	1		3	1	1		4				11		1		42	2	3	
3	(Portugal) Rúben Dias	DF	32	1	4		4		1		3				11		1		50	1	6	
5	(England) John Stones	DF	22	4		1	1				1	1			11				35	5		1
6	(Netherlands) Nathan Aké	DF	10	1	4						1				2				13	1	4	
7	(England) Raheem Sterling	MF	31	10	4		3	1			4	2	1		11	1	1		49	14	6	
8	(Germany) İlkay Gündoğan	MF	28	13	1		4	1			2				12	3	2		46	17	3	
9	(Brazil) Gabriel Jesus	FW	29	9	2		5	2			1	1			7	2	1		42	14	3	
10	(Argentina) Sergio Agüero	FW	12	4							1				7	2			20	6		
11	(Ukraine) Oleksandr Zinchenko	MF	20				1				2				9		1		32		1	
13	(United States) Zack Steffen	GK	1				5				5				1				12			
14	(Spain) Aymeric Laporte	DF	16		1		4		2		3	2	1		4		1		27	2	5	
16	(Spain) Rodri	MF	34	2	6		4				5				10		1		53	2	7	
17	(Belgium) Kevin De Bruyne	MF	25	6	1		3	1			4				8	3	2		40	10	3	
20	(Portugal) Bernardo Silva	MF	26	2	5		3	2			3		2		13	1	1		45	5	8	
21	(Spain) Ferran Torres	FW	24	7	1		3	1			3	1			6	4			36	13	1	
22	(France) Benjamin Mendy	DF	13	2	2		4				2				1				20	2	2	
25	(Brazil) Fernandinho	MF	21		6		4		2		4	1	2		7		2		36	1	12	
26	(Algeria) Riyad Mahrez	MF	27	9			4				5	1			12	4			48	14		
27	(Portugal) João Cancelo	DF	28	2	5	1	3				3		1		9	1	3		43	3	9	1
31	(Brazil) Ederson	GK	36		3										12				48		3	
33	(England) Scott Carson	GK	1																1			
34	(Netherlands) Philippe Sandler	DF																				
47	(England) Phil Foden	MF	28	9			5	2			4	2			13	3			50	16		
48	(England) Liam Delap	FW	1				1				1	1	1						3	1	1	
50	(Spain) Eric García	DF	6				2				1				3		1		12		1	
61	(England) Felix Nmecha	MF					1								1				2			
69	(England) Tommy Doyle	MF					2				1				1				4			
78	(England) Taylor Harwood-Bellis	DF					2				2								4			
80	(England) Cole Palmer	MF									1				1				2			
81	(France) Claudio Gomes	MF					1												1			
82	(Spain) Adrián Bernabé	MF									1								1			
85	(England) James Trafford	GK																				
Own goals				1												1				2		
Totals				83	46	2		11	6	0		12	8	0		25	18	0		131	77	2

=== Goalscorers ===
Includes all competitive matches. The list is sorted alphabetically by surname when total goals are equal.

Rank	No.	Pos.	Player	Premier League	FA Cup	EFL Cup	Champions League	Total
1	8	MF	(Germany) İlkay Gündoğan	13	1	0	3	17
2	47	MF	(England) Phil Foden	9	2	2	3	16
3	9	FW	(Brazil) Gabriel Jesus	9	2	1	2	14
3	26	FW	(Algeria) Riyad Mahrez	9	0	1	4	14
3	7	FW	(England) Raheem Sterling	10	1	2	1	14
6	21	FW	(Spain) Ferran Torres	7	1	1	4	13
7	17	MF	(Belgium) Kevin De Bruyne	6	1	0	3	10
8	10	FW	(Argentina) Sergio Agüero	4	0	0	2	6
9	20	MF	(Portugal) Bernardo Silva	2	2	0	1	5
9	5	DF	(England) John Stones	4	0	1	0	5
11	27	DF	(Portugal) João Cancelo	2	0	0	1	3
12	14	DF	(Spain) Aymeric Laporte	0	0	2	0	2
12	22	DF	(France) Benjamin Mendy	2	0	0	0	2
12	16	MF	(Spain) Rodri	2	0	0	0	2
12	2	DF	(England) Kyle Walker	1	1	0	0	2
16	6	DF	(Netherlands) Nathan Aké	1	0	0	0	1
16	48	FW	(England) Liam Delap	0	0	1	0	1
16	3	DF	(Portugal) Rúben Dias	1	0	0	0	1
16	25	MF	(Brazil) Fernandinho	0	0	1	0	1
Own goals				1	0	0	1	2
Totals				83	11	12	25	131

=== Assists ===
Includes all competitive matches. The list is sorted alphabetically by surname when total assists are equal.

Rank	No.	Pos.	Player	Premier League	FA Cup	EFL Cup	Champions League	Total
1	17	MF	(Belgium) Kevin De Bruyne	12	1	1	4	18
2	47	MF	(England) Phil Foden	5	0	2	3	10
2	7	FW	(England) Raheem Sterling	7	0	1	2	10
4	20	MF	(Portugal) Bernardo Silva	6	1	0	2	9
4	26	FW	(Algeria) Riyad Mahrez	6	1	0	2	9
6	27	DF	(Portugal) João Cancelo	3	1	0	1	5
6	16	MF	(Spain) Rodri	2	3	0	0	5
8	25	MF	(Brazil) Fernandinho	2	1	1	0	4
8	8	MF	(Germany) Ilkay Gundogan	2	1	0	1	4
8	9	FW	(Brazil) Gabriel Jesus	4	0	0	0	4
11	21	FW	(Spain) Ferran Torres	2	0	1	0	3
12	22	DF	(France) Benjamin Mendy	1	0	1	0	2
12	11	DF	(Ukraine) Oleksandr Zinchenko	0	0	1	1	2
14	10	FW	(Argentina) Sergio Agüero	1	0	0	0	1
14	6	DF	(Netherlands) Nathan Aké	1	0	0	0	1
14	1	GK	(Brazil) Ederson Moraes	1	0	0	0	1
14	61	FW	(England) Felix Nmecha	0	0	1	0	1
14	2	DF	(England) Kyle Walker	1	0	0	0	1
Totals				56	9	9	16	90

=== Hat-tricks ===
Player	Against	Result	Date	Competition	Ref
(Algeria) Riyad Mahrez	Burnley	5–0 (H)	28 November 2020	Premier League	
(Spain) Ferran Torres	Newcastle United	4–3 (A)	14 May 2021	Premier League	

(H) – Home; (A) – Away

=== Clean sheets ===
The list is sorted by shirt number when total clean sheets are equal. Numbers in parentheses represent games where both goalkeepers participated and both kept a clean sheet; the number in parentheses is awarded to the goalkeeper who was substituted on, whilst a full clean sheet is awarded to the goalkeeper who was on the field at the start of play.

			Clean sheets				
No.	Player	Games Played	Premier League	FA Cup	EFL Cup	Champions League	Total
31	(Brazil) Ederson	48	19	0	0	7	26
13	(United States) Zack Steffen	12	0	2	3	1	6
33	(England) Scott Carson	1	0	0	0	0	0
Totals			19	2	3	8	32

== Awards ==
In the end of season awards, Ederson won the Premier League Golden Glove for the second consecutive season with his record of 19 clean sheets. Rúben Dias was recognised for his impressive debut season and the impact he had on leading the team's defence in winning the club's own Player of the Year, the prestigious Football Writers Association Footballer of the Year and the Premier League Player of the Season awards. Kevin De Bruyne won the PFA Players' Player of the Year for the second consecutive time. Phil Foden won the Premier League Young Player of the Season and PFA Young Player of the Year, being recognised for his emergence as an outstanding English talent; and six City players were part of the PFA Team of the Year. Meanwhile, Pep Guardiola was awarded the League Managers Association Manager of the Year and the Premier League Manager of the Season awards. Overall, this was the most awards won by City players and managers in the same season.

=== PFA Players' Player of the Year ===
Season	Player	Ref.
2020–21	(Belgium) Kevin De Bruyne	

De Bruyne won this award for the second consecutive year.

=== FWA Footballer of the Year ===
Season	Player	Ref.
2020–21	(Portugal) Rúben Dias	

Dias was the first defender to win this award since the 1988–89 season and, at the time, the fifth Manchester City player to receive it.

=== Premier League Player of the Season ===
Season	Player	Ref.
2020–21	(Portugal) Rúben Dias	

Dias was the first defender to win this award since the 2011–12 season, when it was won by a former City player Vincent Kompany, and, at the time, the third Manchester City player to receive it.

=== PFA Young Player of the Year ===
Season	Player	Ref.
2020–21	(England) Phil Foden	

=== Premier League Young Player of the Season ===
Season	Player	Ref.
2020–21	(England) Phil Foden	

=== Premier League Manager of the Season ===
Season	Manager	Ref.
2020–21	(Spain) Pep Guardiola	

=== LMA Manager of the Year ===
Season	Manager	Ref.
2020–21	(Spain) Pep Guardiola	

=== UEFA Defender of the Season ===
Season	Player	Ref.
2020–21	(Portugal) Rúben Dias	

=== Premier League Golden Glove ===
Season	Player	Clean sheets	Ref.
2020–21	(Brazil) Ederson	19	

This was Ederson's second consecutive win of the Golden Glove award.

=== Etihad Player of the Year ===
Season	Player	Ref.
2020–21	(Portugal) Rúben Dias	

Club's player of the year as voted by supporters.

=== Etihad Player of the Month ===
Month	Player	Ref.
September	(Belgium) Kevin De Bruyne	
October	(England) Kyle Walker	
November	(Portugal) Rúben Dias	
December	(England) John Stones	
January	(Germany) İlkay Gündoğan	
February	(Algeria) Riyad Mahrez	
March	(Belgium) Kevin De Bruyne	

=== Premier League Player of the Month ===
Month	Player	Ref.
January	(Germany) İlkay Gündoğan	
February	(Germany) İlkay Gündoğan	

Gündoğan's wins in January and February were the first time a City player had won consecutive Player of the Month awards.

=== Premier League Manager of the Month ===
Month	Manager	Ref.
January	(Spain) Pep Guardiola	
February	(Spain) Pep Guardiola	

=== PFA Fans' Player of the Month ===
Month	Player	Ref.
February	(Germany) İlkay Gündoğan	
March	(Algeria) Riyad Mahrez	

=== PFA Team of the Year ===
Season	Position	Player	Ref.
2020–21	GK	(Brazil) Ederson	
2020–21	DF	(Portugal) Joao Cancelo	
2020–21	DF	(England) John Stones	
2020–21	DF	(Portugal) Rúben Dias	
2020–21	MF	(Belgium) Kevin De Bruyne	
2020–21	MF	(Germany) Ilkay Gundogan	

=== UEFA Champions League Squad of the Season ===
Season	Position	Player	Ref.
2020–21	GK	(Brazil) Ederson	
2020–21	DF	(Portugal) Rúben Dias	
2020–21	MF	(Belgium) Kevin De Bruyne	
2020–21	MF	(Germany) Ilkay Gundogan	
2020–21	MF	(England) Phil Foden	

=== Alan Hardaker Trophy ===
Season	Player	Ref.
2021	(Algeria) Riyad Mahrez	

Awarded to the man of the match in the EFL Cup final.
