= 2021 EFL Cup final =

Final of the 2020–21 EFL Cup

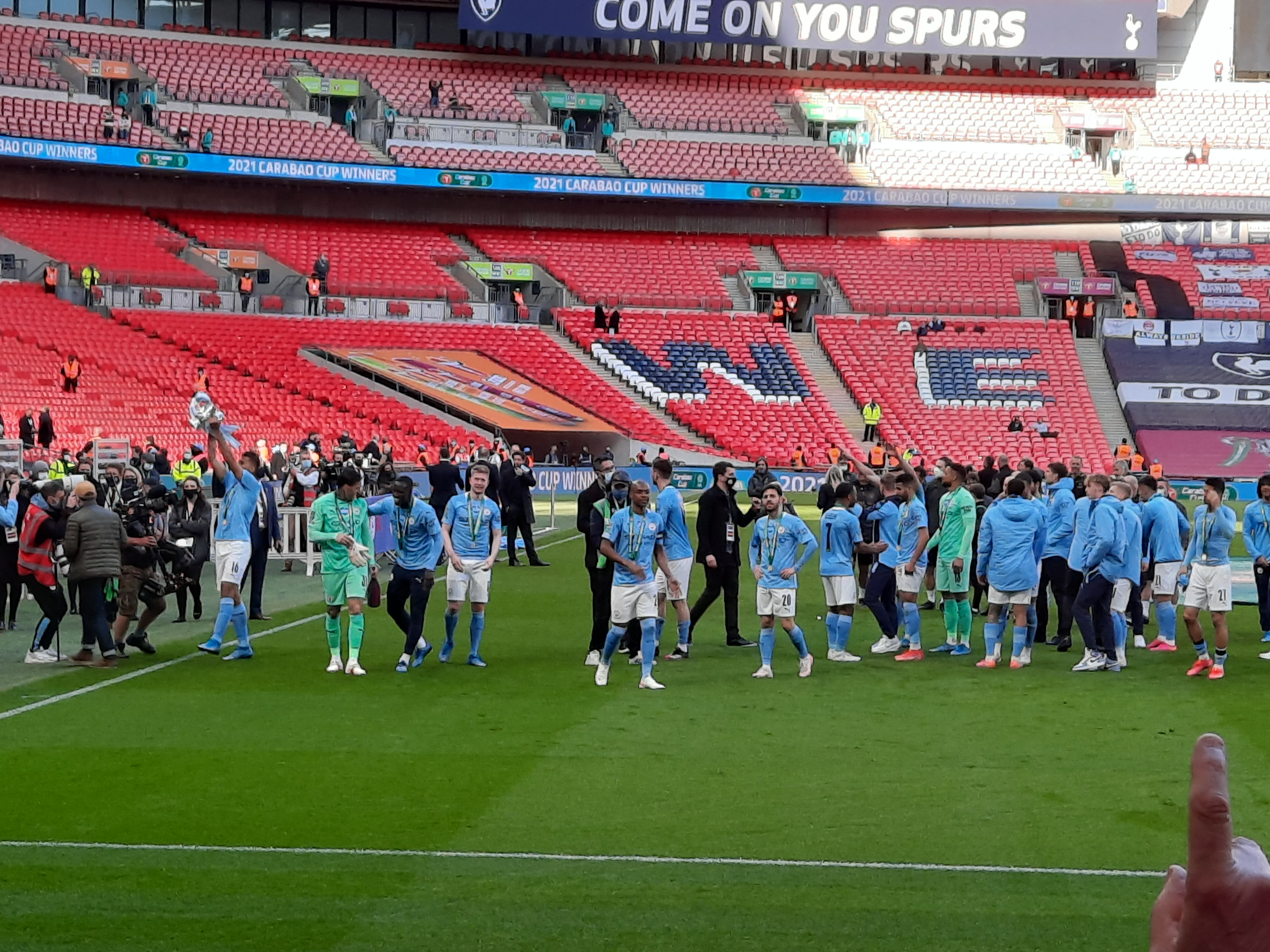
- Manchester City players celebrating their victory
- Event: 2020–21 EFL Cup
Manchester City	Tottenham Hotspur
1	0
- Date: 25 April 2021
- Venue: Wembley Stadium, London
- Man of the Match: Riyad Mahrez (Manchester City)
- Referee: Paul Tierney (Lancashire)
- Attendance: 7,773 (Note: The total number of fans allowed to attend the final was established at 8,000 due to the COVID-19 pandemic in the United Kingdom.)

The 2021 EFL Cup final was the final of the 2020–21 EFL Cup. It was played at Wembley Stadium in London, England, on 25 April 2021, between Manchester City and Tottenham Hotspur, having been originally scheduled to take place on 28 February 2021. The EFL's desire for a greater number of fans to be able to attend the match was the primary reason for the change of date. It was the 61st EFL Cup final and the 14th to be played at the rebuilt Wembley Stadium.

The match was the ninth Football League/EFL Cup final to be played by Tottenham, of which four have ended in victory. One of said wins was the club's most recent domestic trophy up to that point, occurring in 2008.

Manchester City appeared in their ninth Football League/EFL Cup final, and their fourth consecutive final, becoming only the second team to do so, after Liverpool between 1981 and 1984. City's win equalled Liverpool's records of eight EFL Cup wins and four consecutive wins. City's manager Pep Guardiola became the first coach to win the cup in four consecutive years (the first three of Liverpool's four consecutive titles were won by Bob Paisley, and the fourth by Joe Fagan).

The match was televised live by Sky Sports, while radio commentary was provided by BBC Radio and Talksport.

== Ticketing ==
On 22 February 2021, Prime Minister Boris Johnson announced that football supporters would not be permitted in stadiums until 17 May 2021 and then only with a reduced stadium capacity. On 4 April, in yet another schedule to open events to fans, a plan to allow 8,000 supporters at the final was announced. The final was also planned be a pilot event for COVID passports.

In a further announcement on 13 April, a plan to allow 2,000 fans for each club was put forward. This would be subject to the testing of fans for COVID-19 with both a lateral flow test and a PCR test before the game and a PCR test after the game and would not permit those under 18, those deemed clinically vulnerable or pregnant women to attend. Level Playing Field, a charity which campaigns for disabled rights, and a Tottenham Hotspur disabled fans' group both voiced their disapproval that a sub-section of society were excluded from attending the final.

== Route to the final ==
=== Manchester City ===
Round	Opposition	Score
3	Bournemouth (H)	2–1
4	Burnley (A)	3–0
QF	Arsenal (A)	4–1
SF	Manchester United (A)	2–0
Key: (H) = Home; (A) = Away

Manchester City, as a Premier League club involved in the 2020–21 UEFA Champions League, started the competition in the third round. They beat EFL Championship side Bournemouth who were managed by Jason Tindall at the time and won 2–1 on what would their only home match in the tournament with goals from Liam Delap and Phil Foden for Manchester City and one goal from Sam Surridge for Bournemouth.

In the fourth round they defeated fellow Premier League team Burnley 3–0 at Turf Moor with two goals from Raheem Sterling and one from Ferran Torres.

In the quarter-finals they defeated Arsenal 4–1 at the Emirates Stadium with one goal each for City from Gabriel Jesus, Riyad Mahrez, Foden and Aymeric Laporte and one goal for Arsenal from Alexandre Lacazette. This match also saw the face-off between Arsenal manager Mikel Arteta and Manchester City manager Pep Guardiola as Arteta worked under Guardiola before becoming Arsenal manager.

In the semi-finals they defeated local rivals Manchester United 2–0 at Old Trafford with one goal each from Manchester City captain Fernandinho and John Stones. The semi-finals were played over one-leg instead over the traditional two-legs in order to reduce fixture congestion.

=== Tottenham Hotspur ===
Round	Opposition	Score
3	Leyton Orient (A)	Walkover (3–0) (Note: Originally set for 22 September 2020, the tie between Leyton Orient and Tottenham Hotspur was postponed after multiple Orient players tested positive for SARS-CoV-2. On 25 September, it was confirmed that Tottenham had received a bye into the fourth round, due to Orient's inability to fulfil the fixture.)
4	Chelsea (H)	1–1 (5–4 p.)
QF	Stoke City (A)	3–1
SF	Brentford (H)	2–0
Key: (H) = Home; (A) = Away

Tottenham, as a Premier League team involved in the 2020–21 UEFA Europa League, was originally scheduled to start playing in the third round on 22 September 2020. However the match, away to Leyton Orient, was postponed after multiple Orient players tested positive for SARS-CoV-2. On 25 September, it was confirmed that Tottenham had received a bye into the fourth round, due to Orient's inability to fulfil the fixture.

In the fourth round, Tottenham beat London rivals Chelsea at the Tottenham Hotspur Stadium, 5–4 on penalties, after the 90 minutes of play ended 1–1 with one goal for Tottenham Hotspur from Érik Lamela and one goal for Chelsea from Timo Werner. During the resulting penalty shoot-out Eric Dier, Lamela, Pierre-Emile Højbjerg, Lucas and Harry Kane all scored their penalties for Spurs and Tammy Abraham, Chelsea captain César Azpilicueta, Jorginho and Emerson all scored their penalties for Chelsea. However, Mason Mount missed his penalty and as a result Chelsea were eliminated. This match was a face-off between Tottenham Hotspur manager José Mourinho and Chelsea manager Frank Lampard who played under Mourinho at Stamford Bridge.

Tottenham visited Stoke City at the Bet365 Stadium in the quarter-finals, they went home with a 3–1 victory with one goal each for Tottenham Hotspur from Gareth Bale, Ben Davies and Kane and one goal for Stoke City from Jordan Thompson.

In the semi-finals, Tottenham met the only non-Premier League side still playing up to this stage, Brentford of the EFL Championship. Tottenham reached the final with a 2–0 victory at the Tottenham Hotspur Stadium with a goal each for Tottenham Hotspur from Moussa Sissoko and Son Heung-min. The semi-finals were played over one-leg instead over the traditional two-legs in order to reduce fixture congestion.

== Media coverage ==
The match was televised live by Sky Sports on their Football and Main Event channels. Presenter Laura Woods was joined by pundits Michael Dawson, Micah Richards and Jamie Redknapp, with match commentary by Martin Tyler and Gary Neville. Free-to-air highlights were shown later in the evening on Quest. The match was shown in the United States on ESPN+, with coverage available in both English and Spanish.

Radio commentaries were provided by BBC Radio and Talksport. John Murray and Chris Sutton were the BBC commentators; the match was broadcast on Radio 5 Live and the World Service and streamed via the BBC Sounds platform. The Talksport commentary team was made up of Sam Matterface, Stuart Pearce and Ally McCoist. Local stations BBC Radio London and BBC Radio Manchester also carried their own commentaries.

== Match ==
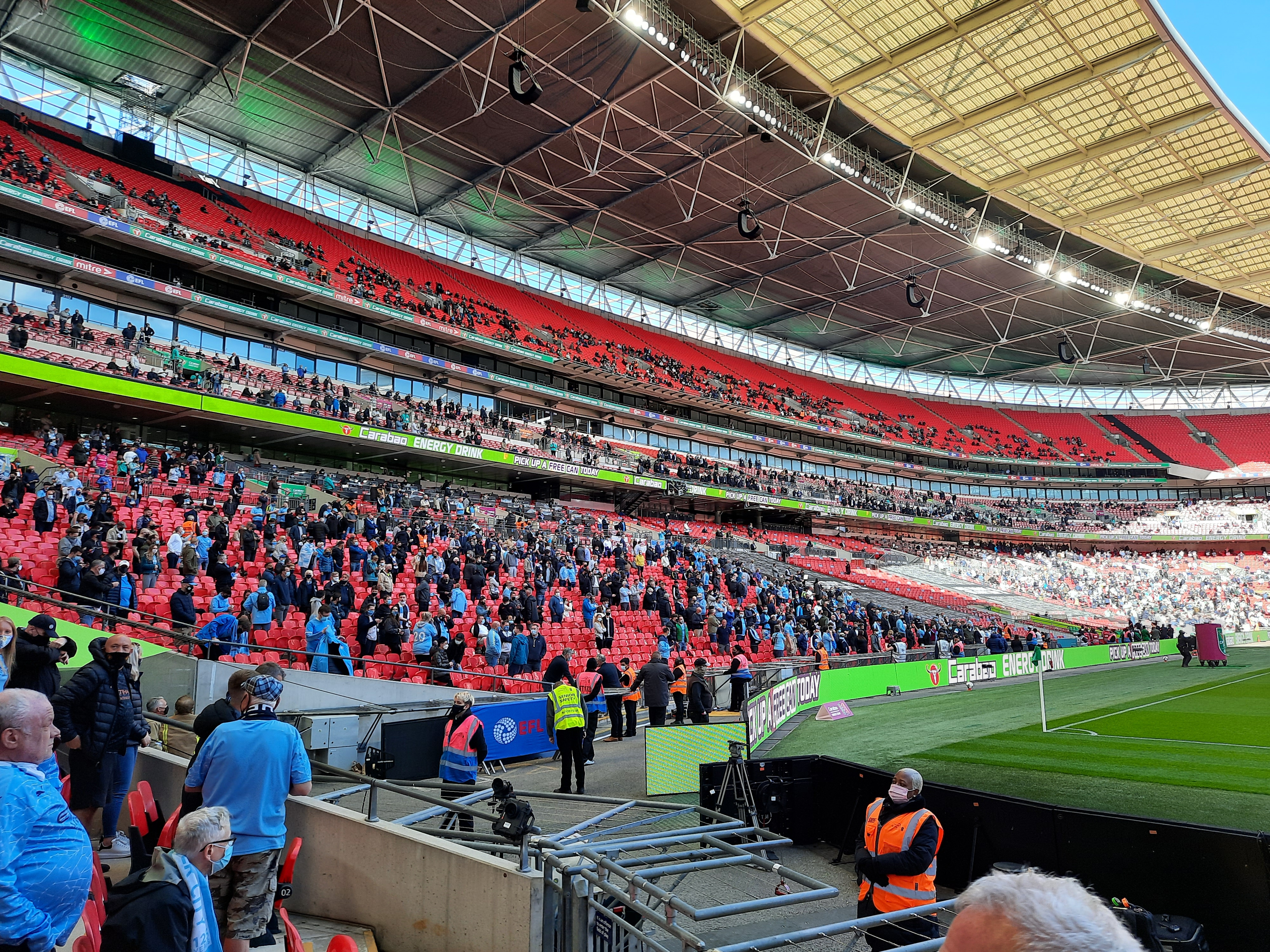
A reduced, socially distanced crowd capped to 8,000 was in attendance for the final.

=== Pre-match ===
On 19 April 2021, it was announced that Tottenham Hotspur head coach José Mourinho had been sacked and replaced by former Tottenham player Ryan Mason as an interim manager until the end of the season, the youngest manager ever to manage in the EFL Cup final at the age of 29 years old. Mason had played in Spurs' last League Cup final in 2015, which they lost 2–0 to Mourinho's Chelsea.

=== Team selection ===
Manchester City manager Pep Guardiola announced in his press conference ahead of the game that forward Sergio Agüero and midfielder Kevin De Bruyne would be fit enough to play, while Tottenham's interim manager, Ryan Mason, announced that he was going to take it "hour by hour" regarding Harry Kane's availability after he missed Spurs first match under Mason against Southampton.

=== Summary ===
==== First half ====
Manchester City kicked off the final at 16:30 BST. The first chance fell to Manchester City when Raheem Sterling wrongfooted Serge Aurier and kept the ball in play and pulled it back for Phil Foden at the near post, he took his shot but fired it just wide of the target in the 7th minute. In the 8th minute, Riyad Mahrez came forward again down the right, he lifted a good cross in the middle for Sterling, he flicked the header on but couldn't keep it down though and it went just over the bar. In the 14th minute, it looked like a throw-in was heading straight out of play but Foden managed to keep it in, he pulled it back for Sterling in space in the middle, he turned before hitting a shot and Eric Dier threw himself in front of it to make the block. In the 20th minute, Zack Steffen punched a corner away, but Spurs managed to keep hold of it, Harry Winks switched the play out to the left for Son Heung-min, who nodded it down for Toby Alderweireld on the edge of the box, he drilled a low shot to the near post but it was just wide of the target. In the 26th minute, Spurs sloppily gave the ball away again and Mahrez whipped in a great cross into Sterling at the far post, but it was cut out by Alderweireld, Foden latched onto the loose ball though and fired a shot on goal but Hugo Lloris reflexively pushed it away at his near post. In the 27th minute, Sergio Reguilón was shown the game's first yellow card for late foul on Kevin De Bruyne. In the 30th minute a through ball from Fernandinho took the Spurs defenders out as Sterling ran onto it; Lloris rushed of his line to close him down so Sterling went for the chip but he couldn't get his angles right and it went wide of the far post. In the 35th minute, Reguilón was with Mahrez as soon as the ball was played into the winger, but Mahrez managed to wrongfoot him and open up a little space for a shot, he whipped it across goal towards the far post and Lloris was beaten but it was just wide of the far post. In the 37th minute, City moved it brilliantly on the edge of the box where they played it between Sterling, Foden, De Bruyne, Fernandinho and finally out to Mahrez on the right. He cut inside before firing another shot on goal but this one went just over the crossbar. In the 41st minute, De Bruyne was given too much time on the ball and he took a few touches before curing a lovely cross towards Sterling at the far post, Dier left it and Sterling reached it on the stretch but he couldn't poke it towards goal. In the 45th minute, Aymeric Laporte was booked for bringing Lucas Moura down. In the first minute of stoppage time, Mahrez wasn't closed down by Spurs again and he cut inside from the right and he had time to pick out a low cross to João Cancelo on the edge of the box he curled his effort towards the near post and Lloris tipped it onto the woodwork in the last action of the first half.

==== Second half ====
Spurs got the second half underway and immediately went on the attack. In the 47th minute, Moura squared a ball to Giovani Lo Celso on the edge of the box and he took a touch before curling it towards the far bottom corner where Steffen pushed it away. In 55th minute, De Bruyne picked out Sterling with a low through ball into the left of the box this time and the forward cut inside before curling a shot towards the far post he sent it wide of the target and it was yet another good chance missed by Sterling. In the 67th minute, Ryan Mason made a double substitution for Spurs with Gareth Bale replacing Moura and Moussa Sissoko replacing Lo Celso. In the 72nd minute, Sterling peeled off the back of Sissoko when İlkay Gündoğan picked him out and Sterling took it to the by line in the box before pulling it back for Gündoğan he took the shot first time but dragged it wide of the near post. In the 74th minute, City went on the counterattack and Mahrez drove through midfield to get into space for a shot he hit his effort through the central defenders and Lloris got a strong hand to it to tip it away from goal. In the 82nd minute, Laporte scored the opener, a good free-kick from De Bruyne on the left and Laporte rose higher than Sissoko at the far post to reach it he flicked his header on and there was nothing Lloris could do to stop it nesting into the bottom left corner. In the 84th minute, Pep Guardiola made his first substitution for City with Rodri replacing Fernandinho. Also in the 84th minute, Mason made Spurs next substitution with Dele Alli replacing Pierre-Emile Højbjerg. In the 87th minute, Guardiola made City's next substitution with Bernardo Silva replacing De Bruyne. In the 90th minute, Mason made another Spurs substitution with Steven Bergwijn replacing Aurier. In the fourth minute of stoppage time, Rodri chipped the ball over Sissoko to pick out Foden's run and the Spurs defenders stopped to ask for offside Foden squared it to Mahrez in the middle of the box and he slotted it past Lloris before the flag belatedly went up against Foden in the last action of the second half and the game. City won 1–0 and sealed a fourth successive title.

=== Details ===
25 April 2021
16:30 BST

Manchester City	1–0	Tottenham Hotspur
Laporte 82'	Report

Wembley Stadium, London
Attendance: 7,773
Referee: Paul Tierney (Lancashire)

Manchester City	Tottenham Hotspur

GK	13	(United States) Zack Steffen
RB	2	(England) Kyle Walker
CB	3	(Portugal) Rúben Dias
CB	14	(Spain) Aymeric Laporte	(yellow card) 45'
LB	27	(Portugal) João Cancelo
CM	17	(Belgium) Kevin De Bruyne		(substituted off) 87'
CM	25	(Brazil) Fernandinho (c)	(yellow card) 59'	(substituted off) 84'
CM	8	(Germany) İlkay Gündoğan
RF	26	(Algeria) Riyad Mahrez
CF	7	(England) Raheem Sterling
LF	47	(England) Phil Foden
Substitutes:
GK	31	(Brazil) Ederson
DF	6	(Netherlands) Nathan Aké
DF	11	(Ukraine) Oleksandr Zinchenko
DF	22	(France) Benjamin Mendy
MF	16	(Spain) Rodri		(substituted on) 84'
MF	20	(Portugal) Bernardo Silva		(substituted on) 87'
FW	9	(Brazil) Gabriel Jesus
FW	10	(Argentina) Sergio Agüero
FW	21	(Spain) Ferran Torres
Manager:
(Spain) Pep Guardiola

GK	1	(France) Hugo Lloris (c)
RB	24	(Ivory Coast) Serge Aurier		(substituted off) 90'
CB	4	(Belgium) Toby Alderweireld
CB	15	(England) Eric Dier
LB	3	(Spain) Sergio Reguilón	(yellow card) 27'
CM	8	(England) Harry Winks
CM	5	(Denmark) Pierre-Emile Højbjerg		(substituted off) 84'
RW	27	(Brazil) Lucas Moura		(substituted off) 67'
AM	18	(Argentina) Giovani Lo Celso		(substituted off) 67'
LW	7	(South Korea) Son Heung-min
CF	10	(England) Harry Kane
Substitutes:
GK	12	(England) Joe Hart
DF	6	(Colombia) Davinson Sánchez
DF	25	(England) Japhet Tanganga
MF	11	(Argentina) Erik Lamela
MF	17	(France) Moussa Sissoko		(substituted on) 67'
MF	20	(England) Dele Alli		(substituted on) 84'
MF	28	(France) Tanguy Ndombele
FW	9	(Wales) Gareth Bale		(substituted on) 67'
FW	23	(Netherlands) Steven Bergwijn		(substituted on) 90'
Manager:
(England) Ryan Mason (interim)

Man of the Match:
Riyad Mahrez (Manchester City)

Assistant referees:
Lee Betts (Norfolk)
Constantine Hatzidakis (Kent)
Fourth official:
Peter Bankes (Liverpool)
Reserve assistant referee:
Dan Robathan (Norfolk)
Video assistant referee:
Andre Marriner (Birmingham)
Assistant video assistant referee:
Adrian Holmes (West Riding)

Match rules

- 90 minutes
- 30 minutes of extra time if necessary
- Penalty shoot-out if scores still level
- Nine named substitutes
- Maximum of five substitutions, with a sixth allowed in extra time (Note: Each team was only given five opportunities to make substitutions, with a sixth opportunity in extra time, excluding substitutions made at half-time, before the start of extra time and at half-time in extra time.)
