= Phil Foden =

English footballer (born 2000)

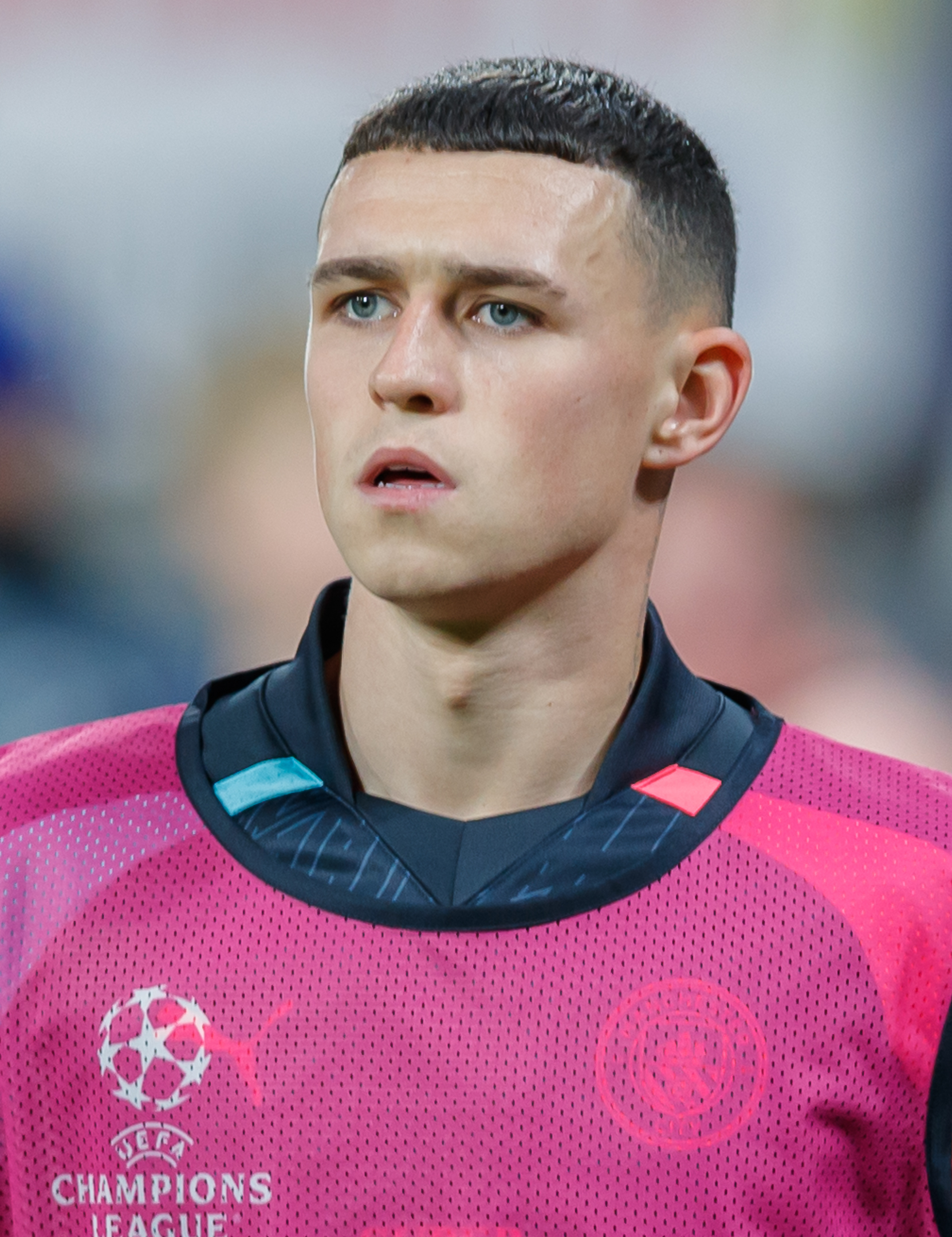
- Foden with Manchester City in 2023

Personal information
- Full name: Philip Walter Foden
- Date of birth: 28 May 2000 (age 26)
- Place of birth: Stockport, Greater Manchester, England
- Height: 5 ft 7 in (1.71 m)
- Position: Midfielder

Team information
- Current team: Manchester City
- Number: 47

Youth career
- 2008–2016: Manchester City

Senior career*
Years	Team	Apps	(Gls)
2017–	Manchester City	231	(69)

International career^{‡}
2015–2016	England U16	6	(2)
2016–2017	England U17	23	(12)
2017	England U18	2	(1)
2018	England U19	3	(1)
2018–2019	England U21	15	(4)
2020–	England	49	(4)
Medal record
Men's football
Representing England
UEFA European Championship
Runner-up	2020 Europe
Runner-up	2024 Germany
FIFA U-17 World Cup
Winner	2017 India
UEFA European Under-17 Championship
Runner-up	2017 Croatia
- * Club domestic league appearances and goals as of 22:11, 24 October 2026 (UTC) ‡ National team caps and goals as of 23:05, 31 March 2026 (UTC)

Philip Walter Foden (born 28 May 2000) is an English professional footballer who plays as a midfielder for Premier League club Manchester City and the England national team.

A product of Manchester City's youth academy, Foden's breakthrough into professional football came in 2017 when he won the FIFA U-17 World Cup Golden Ball award following England's successful Under-17 World Cup campaign. He made his debut for Manchester City during the same year and in December was named BBC Young Sports Personality of the Year.

Foden has since made over 300 appearances for the club, winning 19 honours, including a continental treble in the 2022–23 season and becoming the youngest recipient of a Premier League winner's medal in 2018. In 2019, he won a second Premier League and became the club's youngest-ever goalscorer in the UEFA Champions League, and is the youngest English player to both start a match and score in the knockout stages of the competition. In 2021 and 2022, he was named as the Premier League Young Player of the Season and the PFA Young Player of the Year. In 2024, after scoring 19 league goals, Foden was named as the Premier League Player of the Season and the PFA Players' Player of the Year.

Foden represented England at multiple youth levels before making his debut for the senior team in September 2020. He was part of the England teams for UEFA Euro 2020, the 2022 FIFA World Cup and UEFA Euro 2024.

== Club career ==
=== Manchester City ===
==== Early life and career ====
Philip Walter Foden, the son of Claire Foden, was born on 28 May 2000 in Stockport, Greater Manchester, and was a boyhood supporter of Manchester City. He joined the club at the age of eight and signed his Academy scholarship in July 2016. He was privately educated at St Bede's College, with his tuition fees being paid for by Manchester City. On 6 December 2016, City manager Pep Guardiola included Foden in the matchday squad for the UEFA Champions League group stage match with Celtic; he was an unused substitute in the 1–1 home draw.

==== 2017–18 season ====
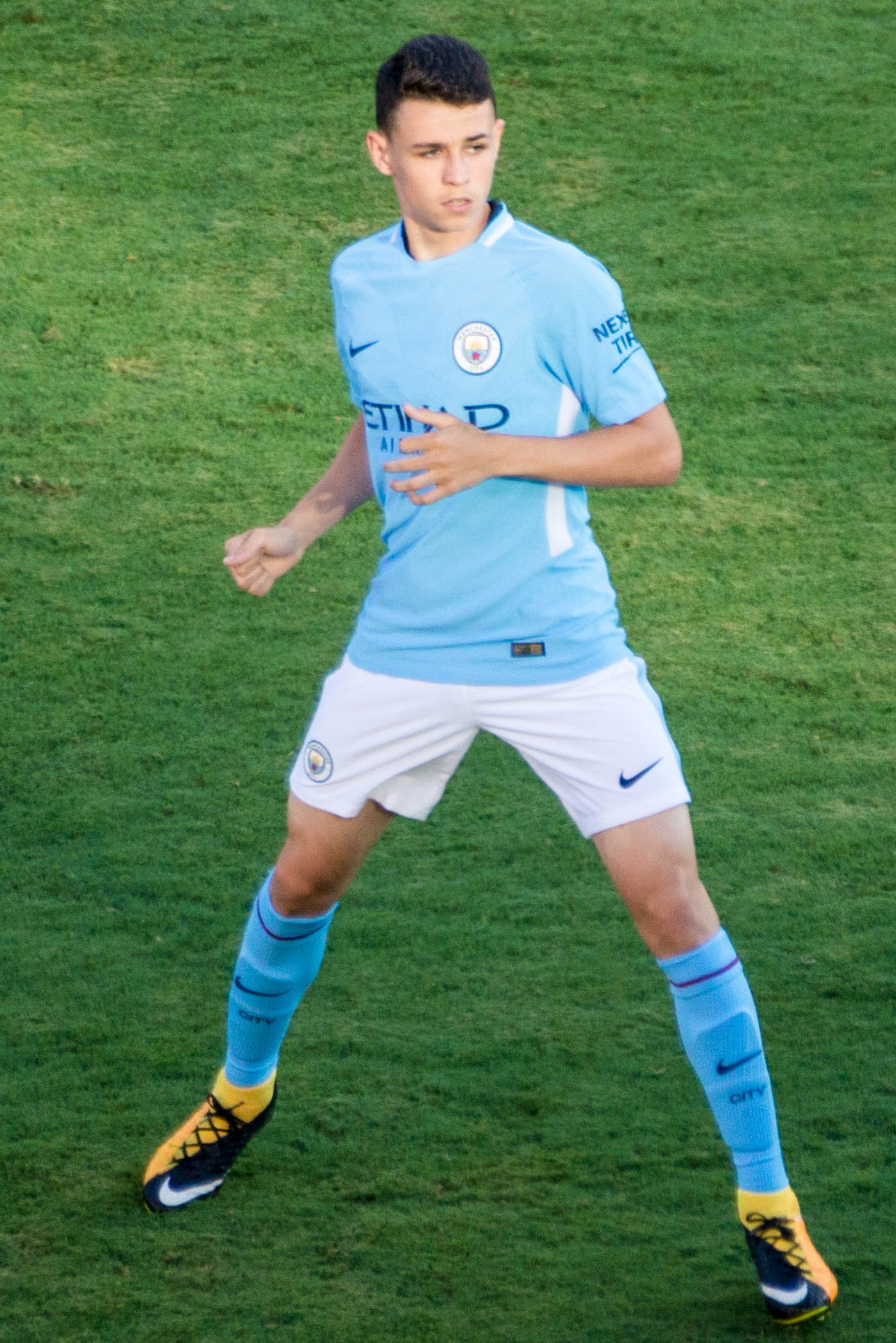
Foden playing for Manchester City in 2017

After making several appearances on the bench at the start of the 2017–18 season, Foden made his Manchester City debut on 21 November 2017 in a Champions League game against Feyenoord, coming on in the 75th minute for Yaya Touré. He became the fourth-youngest English player to make an appearance in the Champions League (17 years 177 days). On 6 December, Foden broke the record previously held by Josh McEachran to become the youngest English player, at the age of 17 years and 192 days, to start a Champions League match, doing so in a 2–1 defeat to Shakhtar Donetsk. On 20 October 2020, Jude Bellingham, aged 17 years and 113 days, broke Phil Foden's record to become the youngest Englishman to start a Champions League match. Foden also became the first player born in the year 2000 to start a match in the competition. He made his Premier League debut as a substitute in a 4–1 win over Tottenham Hotspur on 16 December, appearing in the 83rd minute for İlkay Gündoğan.

Foden featured as a late substitute for Sergio Agüero in the 2018 EFL Cup final on 25 February 2018, helping City secure a 3–0 victory against Arsenal at Wembley Stadium. The following month, he broke Kieran Richardson's record to become the youngest English player to start in a knockout-match in the Champions League, doing so at the age of 17 years and 283 days in a 4–0 win over Basel. On 13 May, he became the youngest player to receive a Premier League winner's medal. Guinness World Records recognised him for this feat in the 2020 edition of their book.

==== 2018–19 season ====
Foden was part of City's starting line-up for the 2018 FA Community Shield on 5 August 2018, playing a total of 75 minutes as well as assisting Agüero's first goal of the game in a 2–0 victory over Chelsea at Wembley Stadium, marking Foden's third winner's medal of the calendar year. On 25 September 2018, he provided an assist to Riyad Mahrez and later scored his first senior goal in stoppage time to secure City a 3–0 away win against Oxford United in the third round of the EFL Cup.

Foden scored his first home goal for City on 6 January 2019 during their 7–0 victory against Rotherham United in the third round of the 2018–19 FA Cup. Three days later, Foden was again on the scoresheet as he helped City defeat Burton Albion 9–0 in the first leg of the EFL Cup semi-finals. On 12 March 2019, Foden scored his first Champions League goal during the second leg of the last-16 tie against Schalke, as City won 7–0 (10–2 on aggregate). In doing so, he helped the club equal the record for the largest winning margin in the knockout phase of the competition. His goal also saw him become Man City's youngest-ever goalscorer in the Champions League and the youngest English goalscorer to score in the knockout stages of the competition, aged 18 years and 288 days. At the start of the following month, he made his first league start for the club in a 2–0 win over Cardiff City, becoming the youngest English player to do so since Daniel Sturridge in 2008. After the match, City manager Pep Guardiola told media that he expected Foden to be an important Manchester City player "for the next decade".

Foden scored his first Premier League goal on 20 April 2019, in a 1–0 victory over Tottenham Hotspur. Upon doing so, he became the third-youngest player to score for the club in the Premier League, after Micah Richards and Sturridge. Man City ended the season completing a domestic sweep of all trophies with Foden having an increasingly prominent role in the squad.

==== 2019–20 season ====
Foden began the 2019–20 season by winning his seventh honour, winning the 2019 Community Shield against Liverpool at Wembley Stadium on 4 August 2019. He scored in the penalty shoot-out which decided the victors. Six days later, he made his first appearance of the 2019–20 Premier League as Manchester City beat West Ham United 5–0 at the London Stadium. On 1 October 2019, Foden scored his first goal of the season in the 2019–20 Champions League, in a 2–0 home victory against Dinamo Zagreb on matchday two of the group stage. Foden created the second most big chances (6) in the Champions League group stage, only behind Lionel Messi (7). Foden made his first Premier League start of the season on 15 December 2019, picking up an assist for Kevin De Bruyne against Arsenal in a 3–0 away victory. On 1 March 2020, Foden started in the EFL Cup final and claimed his sixth major honour and his eighth career trophy as City won 2–1 against Aston Villa. He was also named man of the match, thereby becoming the youngest recipient of the Alan Hardaker Trophy.

On 17 June 2020, Premier League football returned after the COVID-19 pandemic had put the season on hold. Foden was on the scoresheet as City beat Arsenal 3–0 at home. The following match, Foden scored his first Premier League brace and scored in consecutive league games for the first time as Manchester City won 5–0 against Burnley at home. The 2019–20 Premier League season ended on 26 July, with Foden starting in a 5–0 victory over Norwich City, seeing Manchester City finish the season in second place. The occasion, however, was marked with the departure of Foden's idol David Silva, after 10 years with the club. In 2017, Foden stated "Training is faster and it has been great playing with Silva, he's my idol really. I try and watch what he does and learn from him and try and do the same things." Foden was tipped to take over from Silva with Pep Guardiola saying that Manchester City "trust" Phil Foden to replace him. Foden started his second Champions League knockout tie on 7 August 2020, against Real Madrid, helping his side win 2–1 (4–2 on aggregate) and progress on to the quarter-final, where Man City would bow out of the competition. He ended the season with 38 games played, registering 8 goals and 9 assists across all competitions.

==== 2020–21 season ====
Foden opened his account for the 2020–21 season against Wolverhampton Wanderers on the opening matchday of the 2020–21 Premier League season, scoring in a 3–1 away victory on 21 September 2020. He scored his second league goal of the season on 24 October against West Ham United in a 1–1 away draw. He equalised just six minutes after replacing Sergio Agüero at half time, turning smartly to convert a cross from teammate João Cancelo. Foden scored his first 2020–21 Champions League goal away to Olympiacos, on 25 November 2020, with a finish from inside the box after a cut back from Raheem Sterling. This win in the Champions League secured City's progress through to the round of 16 stage for the 8th consecutive season. On 7 February 2021, Foden scored a goal and provided an assist for İlkay Gündoğan's goal in a 4–1 away win over Liverpool, to be his team's first win at Anfield since 2003. Foden once again scored in Merseyside, as Manchester City won 3–1 away at Everton on 17 February, stretching their lead at the top of the table and making it 17 consecutive wins in all competitions. Foden was on the scoresheet in both legs of City's Champions League quarter-final tie against Borussia Dortmund, securing their progress to the last four of the competition.

On 21 April 2021, Foden received the man of the match award and scored against Aston Villa at Villa Park, to give Man City a 2–1 victory and subsequently extended their lead, at the top of the table, to 11 points. This was Foden's 14th goal in all competitions, in the 2020–21 season and his 7th in the Premier League. Just four days later, Foden won his ninth trophy with Manchester City as they beat Tottenham Hotspur 1–0 in the 2021 EFL Cup final, with Foden playing the full 90 minutes. Foden once again made history with City, as they reached the 2021 Champions League final after beating Paris Saint-Germain 4–1 on aggregate, with Foden providing an assist to Riyad Mahrez in the second leg. On 12 May, Foden secured his third Premier League title in four years, as Manchester United were beaten 2–1 by Leicester City. Foden was named in the starting line-up in City's first Champions League final. City would lose the match 1–0 against Chelsea – Foden's first loss in a final during his senior career. He was named in the Champions League Squad of the season and won the Premier League Young Player of the Season while being nominated for both the PFA Players' Player of the Year and PFA Young Player of the Year, winning the latter award.

==== 2021–22 season ====
Foden missed the start of the 2021–22 Premier League season through injury, not being involved against Tottenham Hotspur, Norwich City and Arsenal, while being an unused substitute against Leicester City. He started, scored, provided two assists and won man of the match in a 6–1 victory in the 2021–22 EFL Cup, against Wycombe Wanderers. Foden scored his first Premier League goal of the season on 3 October, in a 2–2 away draw at Liverpool. He received man of the match in a group stage match in the 2021–22 Champions League, against Club Brugge – he would go on to score against Club Brugge in the second leg of the tie. Foden scored a brace in a 4–1 away victory against Brighton & Hove Albion while also providing the assist for Riyad Mahrez's goal, in the Premier League, which earnt him man of the match. He also scored the winner and was awarded man of the match in a 1–0 away win at Brentford, but missed the next game against Arsenal due to fitness issues.

Foden scored twice in two games, in away wins against Norwich City and Sporting CP – on the 12 and 15 February respectively. He once again scored a winning goal and was awarded man of the match at Everton in a 1–0 away win on 26 February. Foden also scored against Real Madrid, in the 4–3 home victory in the semi-finals of the Champions League, though Real Madrid would win the second leg 3–1 away, knocking City out of the competition. He was also involved in City's comeback against Aston Villa, on the final day, to win the Premier League title over Liverpool. Foden finished the year with 14 goals, including nine in the Premier League. He also won the PFA Young Player of the Year award, as well as the Premier League Young Player of the Season for the second consecutive year. Additionally, Foden was nominated for PFA Players' Player of the Year and the 2022 Ballon d'Or.

==== 2022–23 season ====
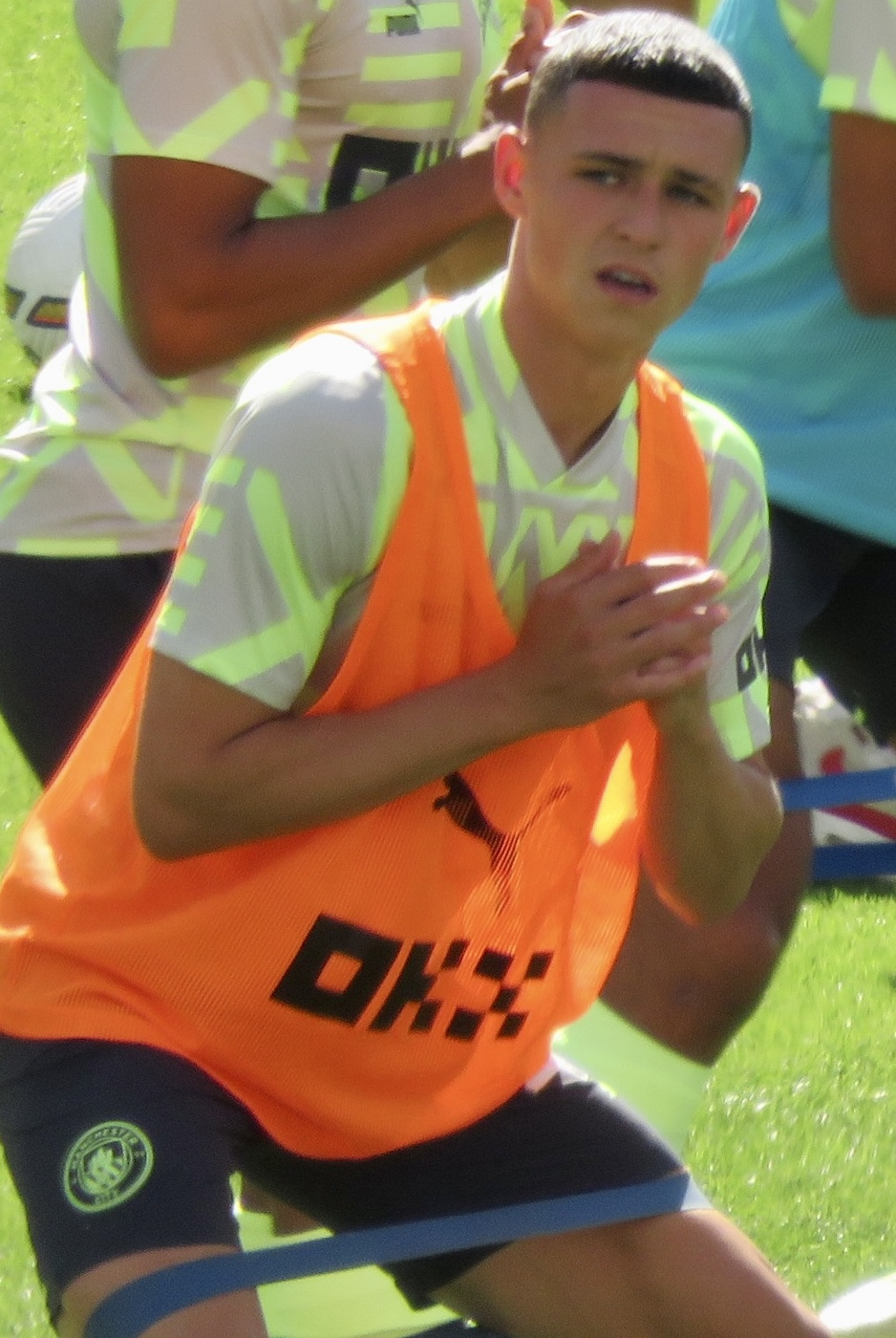
Foden warming up for Manchester City in 2022

On 2 October 2022, Foden scored his first career hat-trick in a 6–3 home win against Manchester United. On 14 October, Foden signed a three-year extension to his current contract with Manchester City, extending it until 2027.

After scoring a goal against Newcastle United on 4 March 2023, Foden became the youngest player to reach 50 Premier League goal involvements for Manchester City. On 20 May, Foden won his fifth league title with Manchester City after they claimed the Premier League title. Foden featured as a late substitute in the 2023 FA Cup final on 3 June, helping City secure a 2–1 win against Manchester United. A week later in the 2023 Champions League final, Foden replaced Kevin De Bruyne after the latter suffered a hamstring injury. City would eventually win the match 1–0 to earn their first Champions League title and complete a continental treble.

==== 2023–24 season ====
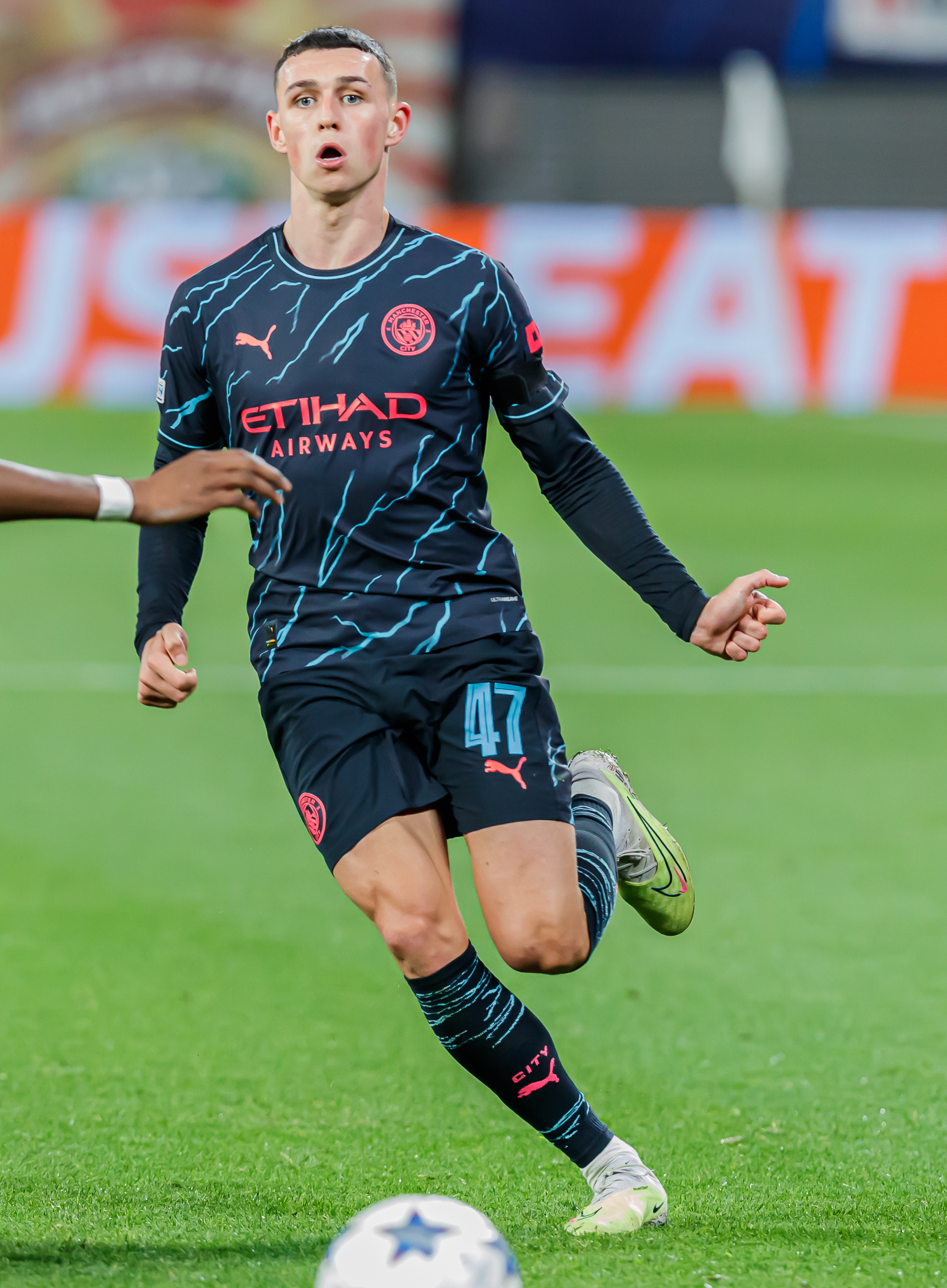
Foden playing for Manchester City in 2023

Following the injury of Kevin De Bruyne, City manager Pep Guardiola began to utilise Foden in a more central attacking role. On 16 August, Foden started in the UEFA Super Cup against Europa League winners Sevilla in which City triumphed in the penalty shoot-out, giving Foden his first trophy of the season. On 22 December, Foden scored in the 2023 FIFA Club World Cup final in a 4–0 win over Fluminense to win his first Club World Cup title. He became the first English player to score in the final since Wayne Rooney in 2008.

On 5 February 2024, Foden scored his second Premier League hat-trick in a 3–1 away win against Brentford. On 3 April, Foden scored his third Premier League hat-trick in a 4–1 home win against Aston Villa, including his first career free kick goal. In the first leg of the Champions League quarter-finals on 9 April, Foden scored against Real Madrid in a 3–3 draw at the Santiago Bernabéu, marking a goal in each of his last five starts in the competition; the joint-longest run by an English player in the competition, along with Steven Gerrard. On 25 April, Foden surpassed 50 Premier League goals for the club by scoring a brace in a 4–0 win over Brighton & Hove Albion.

Following a series of very strong performances, Guardiola commented: "I think he is a really top-class player, he has a natural talent, a gift, and after that, he has an incredible sense of goal." After scoring a decisive brace against Manchester United in March, Guardiola described Foden as the best current player in the Premier League: "He loves to play football. He will already be a legendary player because in a short age, the games played, the minutes, the goals scored, the titles won and he is from the home and that is why the connection with the fans is unbelievable. He always scores goals but now he scores goals to win games. When you do this, you reach another level as a player ... He is the player of the season, with all the respect for incredible players but no one has been so decisive for us as him this season." In May he was named the FWA Footballer of the Year and Premier League Player of the Season. On 19 May, Foden scored two goals in a 3–1 win in the final Premier League game of the season against West Ham United, securing Manchester City their fourth consecutive Premier League title. This win made Foden the youngest player to claim six Premier League titles.

Foden finished the season with a new personal best of 27 goals across all competitions, with 19 of those coming in the Premier League, making him the fourth-highest goalscorer in the league, and being named Manchester City Player of the Year. On 20 August, Foden was voted PFA Players' Player of the Year.

==== 2024–25 season ====
After featuring against Chelsea in the first Premier League match of the season, Foden missed multiple games through illness, making his first start of the season on 24 September against Watford in the EFL Cup. Foden scored, assisted, and won man of the match in a 4–0 UEFA Champions League match against Slovan Bratislava on 1 October, becoming the fourth player to score in each of the last seven Champions League campaigns. On 30 June 2025, Foden scored his 100th goal for Man City in a 4–3 defeat against Al-Hilal in the round of 16 of the 2025 FIFA Club World Cup, becoming the 20th player to achieve this in club history.

==== 2025–present: Contract extension ====
In the 2025–26 season, Foden scored 10 goals and provided seven assists in all competitions. On 22 July 2026, he signed a contract extension with the club, keeping him at Manchester City until 2030.

In the 2026–27 season, Foden scored a hat-trick in Manchester City's 5–1 victory over AEK Athens in the UEFA Champions League on 20 October 2026. His goals helped City secure their second victory in the competition's league phase. The hat-trick was his fourth for Manchester City and his first in the Champions League. Foden had also scored in the club's 3–2 Premier League victory over Ipswich Town earlier that week.

== International career ==
=== Youth ===
In May 2017, Foden scored in the final of the 2017 UEFA European Under-17 Championship as the England under-17s suffered a penalty shoot-out defeat at the hands of Spain.

In October of the same year, Foden gained widespread press attention after scoring twice in the final of the 2017 FIFA U-17 World Cup, also against Spain, as England won the competition. He was named as the best player of the tournament. He won the FIFA U-17 World Cup Golden Ball award in 2017 where he also gained some widespread press attention and significant media coverage.

On 27 May 2019, Foden was included in England's 23-man squad for the 2019 UEFA European Under-21 Championship and scored an impressive goal — his first for the U21s — in the opening 2–1 defeat to France in Cesena.

=== Senior ===
==== Debut and UEFA Euro 2020 ====
On 25 August 2020, Gareth Southgate named Foden in the England senior team for the first time. He made his international debut against Iceland on 5 September 2020, in a 1–0 away victory in the UEFA Nations League tournament. On 7 September, Foden, alongside England teammate Mason Greenwood, was withdrawn from the England squad due to breaking the team's COVID-19 isolation protocols by bringing at least one guest to their team hotel in Iceland. Manchester City condemned Foden's actions.

Foden scored his first and second goals for England during a UEFA Nations League match against Iceland at Wembley Stadium on 18 November 2020.

On 1 June 2021, Foden was named in the 26-man squad for the newly rescheduled UEFA Euro 2020. He joined up with the squad at a later date due to his participation in that year's Champions League final. On 8 June, Foden revealed that he had dyed his hair blonde – drawing comparisons to former England midfielder Paul Gascoigne who also had a similar haircut for Euro 1996. Foden said in a press conference on the same day that: "The full nation know what he means to the country and what he did, so it won't be too bad if I try to bring a bit of Gazza on to the pitch."

==== 2022 FIFA World Cup and UEFA Euro 2024 ====
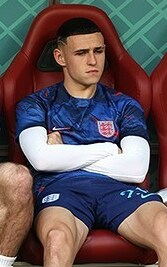
Foden with England at the 2022 FIFA World Cup

On 10 November 2022, Foden was included in the 26-man squad for England's 2022 FIFA World Cup campaign in Qatar. He made his first appearance in the competition as a 71st-minute sub in a 6–2 win against Iran. On 29 November, he scored England's second goal in the 51st minute in a 3–0 win against Wales. It was also his first goal in a major international tournament for his country. In the following game against Senegal, Foden assisted Harry Kane's goal in the third minute of added time in the first half. He then followed this up in assisting Bukayo Saka in his second-half goal in the 57th minute.

Foden was named in England's 26-man squad for UEFA Euro 2024. He started on the left of the attack in the team's opening match against Serbia, playing the full 90 minutes as England won 1–0 to go top of Group C.

== Style of play ==
Described by his former manager Pep Guardiola as "the most, most, most talented player I have ever seen", Foden has consistently ranked amongst lists of the world's 100 best footballers. Foden is left-footed, and can play as a wing-back, or a winger on the right, though Guardiola has described him as "more of a midfielder". He has occasionally been used in a central attacking role as a false 9. In 2017, Guardiola described him as "a special player", saying: "It's dangerous to say good things about young players because they are still young, and they have to grow and they have to learn many, many things... But we have a lot of confidence to help him, because we believe he is a guy who has potential, even if he's not strong, he's not tall." In 2017, Louise Taylor of The Guardian described Foden as "boasting tight, adhesive control and blessed with the knack of drifting past opponents". In 2018, veteran football writer Brian Glanville described him as a "gifted and precocious teenager", adding: "Young players of his skill and inventive quality are pitifully thin on the ground."

== Personal life ==
Foden has three children with his long-term girlfriend Rebecca Cooke; a son born in 2019, a daughter born in 2021 and another child born during Euro 2024. He wears the 47 shirt and has a matching tattoo on his neck in honour of his grandfather, Ronnie, who died at the age of 47. On 26 June 2024, Foden left England's squad during the European tournament to attend the birth of his third child.

Foden is an avid fisherman, considering it one of his favourite activities outside of football.

== Career statistics ==
=== Club ===
As of match played 24 October 2026

Appearances and goals by club, season and competition
Club	Season	League			FA Cup		EFL Cup		Europe		Other		Total	
Club	Season	Division	Apps	Goals	Apps	Goals	Apps	Goals	Apps	Goals	Apps	Goals	Apps	Goals
Manchester City	2017–18	Premier League	5	0	0	0	2	0	3 (Note: Appearances in UEFA Champions League)	0	—		10	0
Manchester City	2018–19	Premier League	13	1	3	3	5	2	4	1	1 (Note: Appearance in FA Community Shield)	0	26	7
Manchester City	2019–20	Premier League	23	5	4	1	5	0	5	2	1	0	38	8
Manchester City	2020–21	Premier League	28	9	5	2	4	2	13	3	—		50	16
Manchester City	2021–22	Premier League	28	9	4	1	2	1	11	3	0	0	45	14
Manchester City	2022–23	Premier League	32	11	5	3	2	0	8	1	1	0	48	15
Manchester City	2023–24	Premier League	35	19	5	2	1	0	8	5	4 (Note: One appearance in FA Community Shield, one appearance in UEFA Super Cup, two appearances and one goal in FIFA Club World Cup)	1	53	27
Manchester City	2024–25	Premier League	28	7	6	0	2	0	9	3	4 (Note: Appearances in FIFA Club World Cup)	3	49	13
Manchester City	2025–26	Premier League	33	7	4	0	6	1	7	2	—		50	10
Manchester City	2026–27	Premier League	6	1	0	0	0	0	2	3	1	0	9	4
Career total			231	69	36	12	29	6	70	23	12	4	378	114

=== International ===
As of match played 31 March 2026

Appearances and goals by national team and year
National team	Year	Apps	Goals
England	2020	3	2
England	2021	10	0
England	2022	9	1
England	2023	9	1
England	2024	12	0
England	2025	4	0
England	2026	2	0
Total		49	4

As of match played 31 March 2026
England score listed first, score column indicates score after each Foden goal

List of international goals scored by Phil Foden
No.	Date	Venue	Cap	Opponent	Score	Result	Competition	Ref.
1	18 November 2020	Wembley Stadium, London, England	3	Iceland	3–0	4–0	2020–21 UEFA Nations League A	
2	18 November 2020	Wembley Stadium, London, England	3	Iceland	4–0	4–0	2020–21 UEFA Nations League A	
3	29 November 2022	Ahmad bin Ali Stadium, Al Rayyan, Qatar	20	Wales	2–0	3–0	2022 FIFA World Cup	
4	12 September 2023	Hampden Park, Glasgow, Scotland	27	Scotland	1–0	3–1	Friendly	

== Honours ==
Manchester City

- Premier League: 2017–18, 2018–19, 2020–21, 2021–22, 2022–23, 2023–24
- FA Cup: 2018–19, 2022–23, 2025–26; runner-up: 2023–24, 2024–25
- EFL Cup: 2017–18, 2018–19, 2019–20, 2020–21, 2025–26
- FA Community Shield: 2018, 2019 2024
- UEFA Champions League: 2022–23; runner-up: 2020–21
- UEFA Super Cup: 2023
- FIFA Club World Cup: 2023

England U17

- FIFA U-17 World Cup: 2017
- UEFA European Under-17 Championship runner-up: 2017

England

- UEFA European Championship runner-up: 2020, 2024

Individual

- UEFA European Under-17 Championship Team of the Tournament: 2017
- FIFA U-17 World Cup Golden Ball: 2017
- BBC Young Sports Personality of the Year: 2017
- Alan Hardaker Trophy: 2020
- IFFHS Men's World Youth (U20) Team: 2020
- UEFA Champions League Squad of the Season: 2020–21, 2023–24
- Premier League Young Player of the Season: 2020–21, 2021–22
- PFA Young Player of the Year: 2020–21, 2021–22
- PFA Players' Player of the Year: 2023–24
- PFA Team of the Year: 2023–24 Premier League
- FWA Footballer of the Year: 2023–24
- Premier League Player of the Season: 2023–24
- Premier League Fan Team of the Season: 2023–24
- Manchester City Player of the Year: 2023–24
