= List of Tottenham Hotspur F.C. managers =

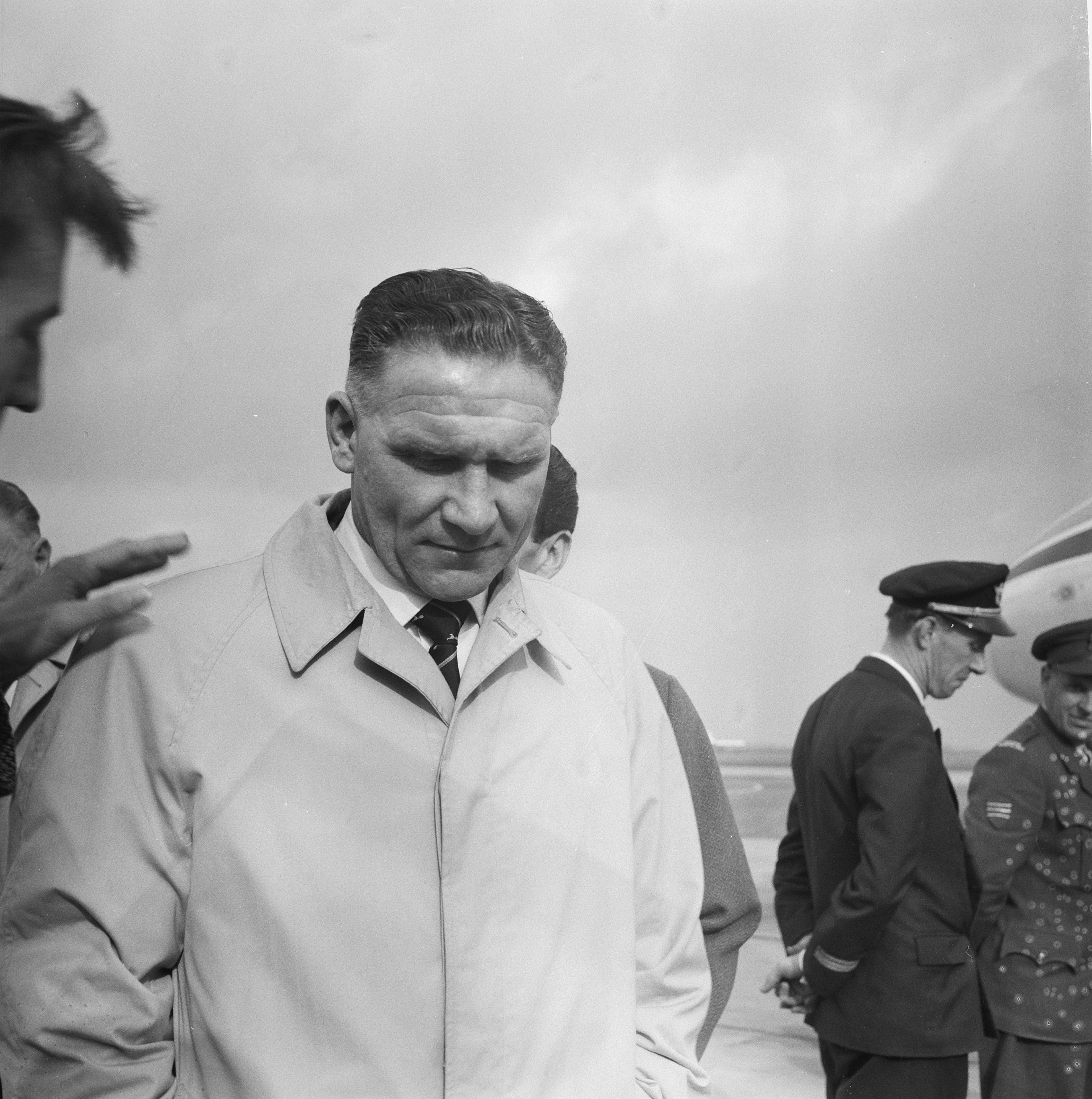
Bill Nicholson (pictured) is Tottenham Hotspur's most successful manager, with 12 honours during his tenure at the club.

The following is a table of managers and coaches that have been in charge of Tottenham Hotspur in date ascending order from past to present.

== Managers ==
- Listed according to when they became managers for Tottenham Hotspur:
- (A) – acting
- (C) – caretaker
- (I) – interim

Year	Nat.	Manager	Year	Nat.	Manager	Year	Nat.	Manager
1898	(England)	Frank Brettell	1994	(England)	Steve Perryman (C)	2023	(Australia)	Ange Postecoglou
1899	(Scotland)	John Cameron	1994	(England)	Gerry Francis	2025	(Denmark)	Thomas Frank
1907	(England)	Fred Kirkham	1997	(Republic of Ireland)	Chris Hughton (C)	2026	(Croatia)	Igor Tudor
1912	(Scotland)	Peter McWilliam	1997	(Switzerland)	Christian Gross	2026	(Italy)	Roberto De Zerbi
1927	(England)	Billy Minter	1998	(England)	David Pleat (C)
1930	(England)	Percy Smith	1998	(Scotland)	George Graham
1935	(England)	Wally Hardinge (C)	2001	(England)	David Pleat (C)
1935	(England)	Jack Tresadern	2001	(England)	Glenn Hoddle
1938	(Scotland)	Peter McWilliam	2003	(England)	David Pleat (C)
1942	(England)	Arthur Turner	2004	(France)	Jacques Santini
1946	(England)	Joe Hulme	2004	(Netherlands)	Martin Jol
1949	(England)	Arthur Rowe	2007	(England)	Clive Allen & Alex Inglethorpe (C)
1955	(England)	Jimmy Anderson	2007	(Spain)	Juande Ramos
1958	(England)	Bill Nicholson	2008	(England)	Clive Allen & Alex Inglethorpe (C)
1974	(Northern Ireland)	Terry Neill	2008	(England)	Harry Redknapp
1976	(England)	Keith Burkinshaw	2012	(Portugal)	André Villas-Boas
1984	(Wales)	Peter Shreeves	2013	(England)	Tim Sherwood
1986	(England)	David Pleat	2014	(Argentina)	Mauricio Pochettino
1987	(England)	Trevor Hartley (C)	2019	(Portugal)	José Mourinho
1987	(England)	Doug Livermore	2021	(England)	Ryan Mason (I)
1987	(England)	Terry Venables	2021	(Portugal)	Nuno Espírito Santo
1991	(Wales)	Peter Shreeves	2021	(Italy)	Antonio Conte
1992	(England)	Doug Livermore & Ray Clemence	2023	(Italy)	Cristian Stellini (A)
1993	(Argentina)	Osvaldo Ardiles	2023	(England)	Ryan Mason (A)

== Managers with the highest win percentage ==
Based on win percentage in all competitive competitions

- Stats correct as of 13 April 2025

Rank	Manager	Years	Played	Won	Win %	Ref.
1	(England) Frank Brettell	1898–1899	52	34	65.38	
2	(England) Arthur Turner	1942–1946	49	27	55.10	
3	(Portugal) André Villas-Boas	2012–2013	80	44	55.00	
4	(Argentina) Mauricio Pochettino	2014–2019	293	159	54.27	
5	(Italy) Antonio Conte	2021–2023	76: (Note: Does not include 0–3 loss in forfeited match in the UEFA Europa Conference League against Rennes on 9 December 2021.)	41	53.95	
6	(Scotland) John Cameron	1899–1907	570	296	51.93	
7	(Portugal) José Mourinho	2019–2021	86	44	51.16	
8	(England) David Pleat	1986–1987, 1998, 2001, 2003–2004 (Note: David Pleat was permanent manager for the period 1986–1987 and caretaker manager for the periods 1998, 2001 and 2003–2004. Statistics are for Pleat's combined total of games for all four periods.)	118	59	50.00	
9	(England) Tim Sherwood	2013–2014	28	14	50.00	
10	(England) Harry Redknapp	2008–2012	198	98	49.49	
11	(England) Bill Nicholson	1958–1974	823	401	48.72	
12	(England) Arthur Rowe	1949–1955	278	135	48.56	

== Honours ==
Manager	Honours	Total
(Scotland) John Cameron	Southern League: 1899–1900; FA Cup: 1900–01; Sheriff of London Charity Shield: 1902; Western League: 1903–04	4
(Scotland) Peter McWilliam	Second Division: 1919–20; FA Cup: 1920–21; FA Charity Shield: 1921	3
(England) Arthur Rowe	First Division: 1950–51; Second Division: 1949–50; FA Charity Shield: 1951	3
(England) Bill Nicholson	First Division: 1960–61; FA Cup: 1960–61, 1961–62, 1966–67; League Cup: 1970–71, 1972–73; FA Charity Shield: 1961, 1962, 1967 (shared); UEFA Cup Winners' Cup: 1962–63; UEFA Cup: 1971–72; Anglo-Italian League Cup: 1971	12
(England) Keith Burkinshaw	FA Cup: 1980–81, 1981–82; FA Charity Shield: 1981 (shared); UEFA Cup: 1983–84	4
(England) Terry Venables	FA Cup: 1990–91	1
(Wales) Peter Shreeves	FA Charity Shield: 1991 (shared)	1
(Scotland) George Graham	League Cup: 1998–99	1
(Spain) Juande Ramos	League Cup: 2007–08	1
(Australia) Ange Postecoglou	UEFA Europa League: 2024–25	1
