= Arthur Turner (Tottenham Hotspur football manager) =

English football manager (died 1949)

Personal information
- Date of death: 1949

Managerial career
- Years: Team
- 1908–1912: Tottenham Hotspur
- 1942–1946: Tottenham Hotspur

Arthur Turner (died 1949) was an English football manager. A lifelong employee of Tottenham Hotspur Football Club, he served in a number of capacities from 1906 when he joined as secretary of the club.

== Career ==
On the resignation of Fred Kirkham in 1908 the directors of the club decided not to appoint a new manager. However, Turner took responsibility in the main for running the side until December 1912 when Peter McWilliam was appointed manager.

Turner remained at the club and ensured its continuance during the First World War.

Once again, in August 1942 Turner took over as manager and steered the club through the remaining period of the Second World War and the most difficult time in its history. Although the Football League had been suspended during the war years, a fixture list of cup competitions and ‘friendlies’ was fulfilled in the main due to Turner’s efforts to ensure a full team was always fielded. His record as a manager during this period reads:- Played 49, Won 27, Drew 11, Lost 11.

In 1946 he was succeeded as Manager by Joe Hulme. Turner continued to serve the club until his death in 1949, a period totalling some 43 years.
