= Tottenham Hotspur F.C. in European football =

English club in European football

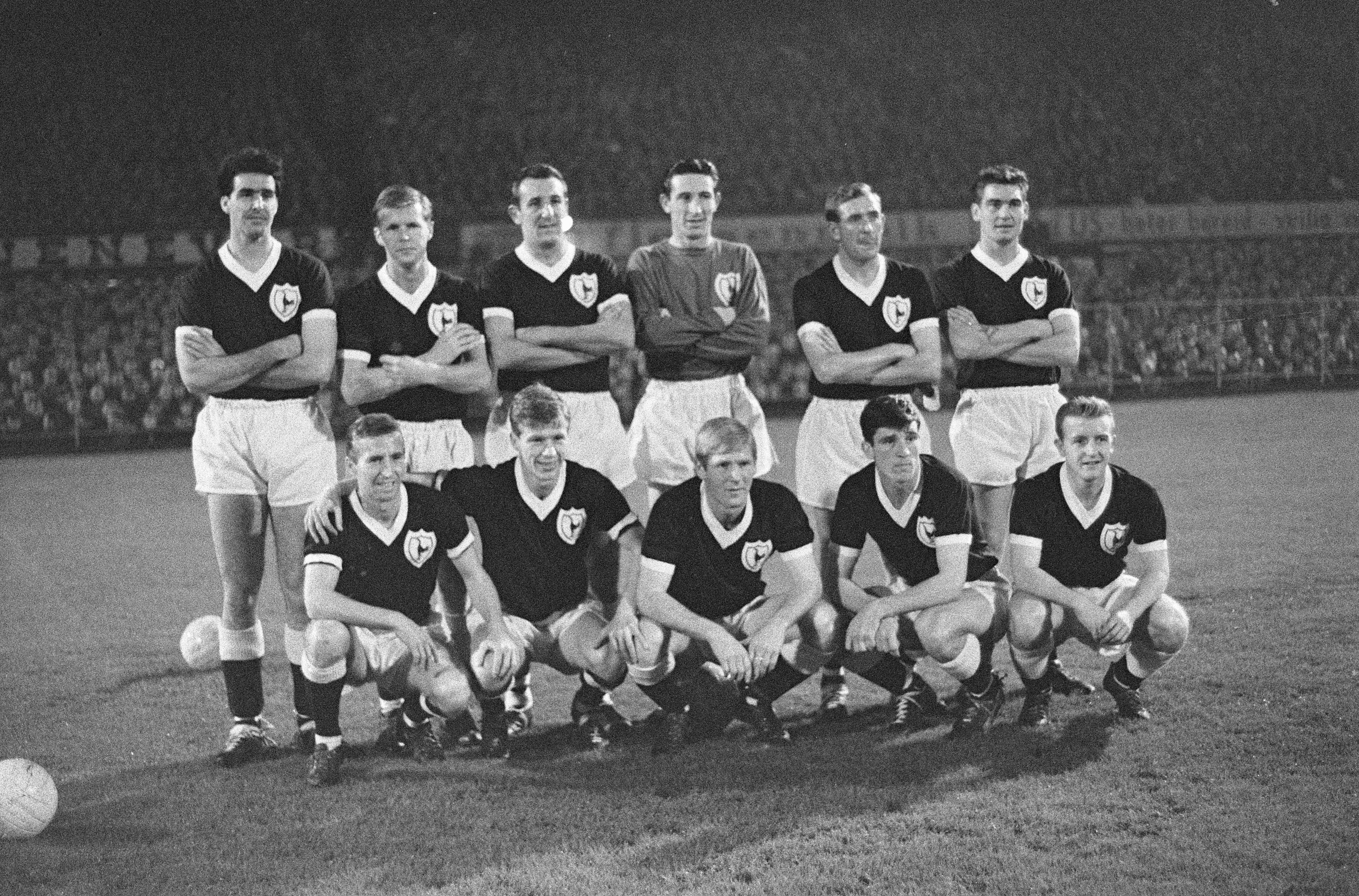
- Tottenham Hotspur squad prior to playing Feyenoord in the 1961–62 European Cup
- Club: Tottenham Hotspur
- Seasons played: 33
- First entry: 1961–62 European Cup
- Latest entry: 2025–26 UEFA Champions League

Titles
- Europa League: 3: 1972; 1984; 2025
- Cup Winners' Cup: 1: 1963

Tottenham Hotspur Football Club became the first English and British club to win a major European, UEFA-regulated competition, with their win against Atlético Madrid in the final of the 1962–63 European Cup Winners' Cup. (Note: While Northern Ireland club Glentoran are considered to be the first British club to win a European/continental trophy overall by winning the Vienna Cup in 1914, the feat was achieved 40 years before the UEFA was established in 1954.) In 1972, they won the inaugural UEFA Cup – beating fellow English club Wolverhampton Wanderers in the final – and won the competition again in 1984 and 2025, the latter after it was renamed into the UEFA Europa League. Additionally, they were runners-up in the same competition in 1974, losing to Dutch side Feyenoord Rotterdam in the final. Furthermore, the team regularly qualified for European football in the 2010s, culminating with a runner-up finish in the 2018–19 UEFA Champions League, where they lost the final to fellow English club Liverpool.

Defender Steve Perryman is the club's most decorated player, winning two UEFA Cup titles. Striker Harry Kane holds the record for most goals with 45, and most appearances with 76. In September 2021, Kane became the first player to score a hat-trick in each of the Champions League, Europa League, and Europa Conference League.

Up until 2016, White Hart Lane served as the club's home venue for European home matches, which was temporarily replaced with Wembley Stadium the following season. Their first home match of the 2016–17 UEFA Champions League group stage saw the club's highest-ever record attendance of 85,011 for a European home match against Monaco. As of 2019, home games are played at the Tottenham Hotspur Stadium. Tottenham have a tradition of wearing white shorts as part of their kit during European fixtures, as opposed to the navy blue shorts they wear during domestic fixtures, an idea conceived to help increase visibility under poor quality floodlights.

== Summary ==
=== By competition ===
Competition	Seasons	Titles	Pld	W	D	L	GF	GA	GD	Last season played	Best result
European Cup; UEFA Champions League	8	0	73	34	15	24	138	104	+34	2025–26	Finalists
UEFA Cup; UEFA Europa League	16	3	168	97	40	31	343	147	+196	2024–25	Winners
UEFA Europa Conference League	1	0	8	3	1	4	14	12	+2	2021–22	Group stage
UEFA Super Cup	1	0	1	0	1	0	2	2	0	2025	Finalists
UEFA Cup Winners' Cup	6	1	33	20	5	8	65	34	+31	1991–92	Winners
UEFA Intertoto Cup	1	0	4	1	0	3	3	13	−10	1995	Group stage
Total	33	4	287	156	62	69	565	322	+243		

Source: UEFA.com, Last updated on 18 March 2026.
Pld = Matches played; W = Matches won; D = Matches drawn; L = Matches lost; GF = Goals for; GA = Goals against. Defunct competitions indicated in italics.

=== By home or away ===
Overall	Pld	W	D	L	GF	GA	GD
Home^{1} ^{2}	142	102	23	17	354	120	+234
Away	143	54	38	51	208	189	+19
Neutral	4	2	1	1	8	5	+3
Total	289	158	62	69	570	314	+256

Last updated: 18 March 2026

^{1} Includes two 1995 Intertoto Cup matches against Lucerne and Östers where Tottenham played as hosts away from their home stadium, at The Goldstone Ground. They lost both matches and Tottenham was banned from UEFA European competitions for the following season, after fielding under-strength sides.

^{2} Tottenham’s final group stage match at home in the 2021–22 UEFA Europa Conference League against Rennes did not take place due to numerous positive COVID-19 tests in the Tottenham Hotspur squad. The UEFA Appeals Body declined Tottenham’s request to rearrange the game before the 31 December deadline, which meant they had forfeited the game, awarding a 3–0 win for Rennes.

=== By opponent ===
Table correct as of match played 18 March 2026.

Opponent	Played	Won	Lost	Drawn	For	Against	Difference
(Denmark) AaB	1	1	0	0	3	2	+1
(Scotland) Aberdeen	2	1	0	1	5	2	+3
(Netherlands) Ajax	4	3	1	0	9	4	+5
(Belgium) Anderlecht	5	1	1	3	6	6	0
(Cyprus) Anorthosis Famagusta	2	1	0	1	7	2	+5
(Belgium) Antwerp	2	1	1	0	2	1	+1
(Russia) Anzhi Makhachkala	2	2	0	0	6	1	+5
(Cyprus) APOEL	2	2	0	0	6	0	+6
(Greece) Asteras Tripolis	2	2	0	0	7	2	+5
(Spain) Atlético Madrid	3	2	0	1	10	8	+2
Austria Wien	2	1	0	1	2	1	+1
(Netherlands) AZ	3	2	0	1	4	2	+2
(Spain) Barcelona	4	0	2	2	4	7	−3
(Switzerland) Basel	2	0	0	2	4	4	0
(Germany) Bayer Leverkusen	3	1	1	1	1	1	0
(Germany) Bayern Munich	6	1	4	1	7	16	−9
(Portugal) Benfica	4	1	2	1	6	9	−3
(Turkey) Beşiktaş	3	1	1	1	3	2	+1
(Norway) Bodø/Glimt	3	2	0	1	7	3	+4
(Czech Republic) Bohemians Prague	2	1	0	1	3	1	+2
(Germany) Borussia Dortmund	7	5	2	0	12	7	+5
(Portugal) Braga	4	4	0	0	15	4	+11
(Belgium) Club Brugge	3	2	1	0	7	3	+4
(Northern Ireland) Coleraine	2	2	0	0	7	0	+7
(Denmark) Copenhagen	1	1	0	0	4	0	+4
(Russia) CSKA Moscow	2	2	0	0	4	1	+3
(Romania) Dinamo București	1	1	0	0	3	1	+2
(Georgia (country)) Dinamo Tbilisi	4	3	0	1	14	2	+12
(Croatia) Dinamo Zagreb	3	2	1	0	6	3	+3
(Ukraine) Dnipro Dnipropetrovsk	2	1	1	0	3	2	+1
(Republic of Ireland) Drogheda United	2	2	0	0	14	0	+14
(Czech Republic) Dukla Prague	2	1	1	0	4	2	+2
(Republic of Ireland) Dundalk	2	1	0	1	2	1	+1
(Germany) Eintracht Frankfurt	7	4	2	1	10	5	+5
(Sweden) IF Elfsborg	1	1	0	0	3	0	+3
(Hungary) Ferencváros	1	1	0	0	2	1	+1
(Netherlands) Feyenoord	8	3	2	3	12	9	+3
(Italy) Fiorentina	4	1	1	2	5	4	+1
(Turkey) Galatasaray	1	0	0	1	2	3	−1
(Belgium) Gent	2	0	1	1	2	3	−1
(Spain) Getafe	1	0	1	0	1	2	−1
(Poland) Górnik Zabrze	2	1	1	0	10	5	+5
(Switzerland) Grasshopper	2	2	0	0	9	2	+7
(Croatia) Hajduk Split	6	4	0	2	10	6	+4
(Israel) Hapoel Tel Aviv	1	1	0	0	2	0	+2
(Scotland) Heart of Midlothian	2	1	0	1	5	0	+5
(Germany) TSG Hoffenheim	1	1	0	0	3	2	+1
(Italy) Inter Milan	6	3	3	0	12	11	+1
(Italy) Juventus	2	0	1	1	3	4	−1
(Germany) 1. FC Kaiserslautern	2	1	1	0	1	2	−1
(Iceland) Keflavík	2	2	0	0	15	1	+14
(Germany) 1. FC Köln	3	2	1	0	5	9	−4
(Italy) Lazio	2	0	0	2	0	0	0
(Cyprus) AEL Limassol	2	2	0	0	5	1	+4
(Austria) LASK	2	1	0	1	6	3	+3
(England) Liverpool	3	1	2	0	2	4	−2
(Bulgaria) Lokomotiv Plovdiv	1	1	0	0	2	1	+1
(East Germany) Lokomotive Leipzig	2	2	0	0	4	1	+3
(Switzerland) Lucerne	1	0	1	0	0	2	−2
(Bulgaria) Ludogorets Razgrad	2	2	0	0	7	1	+6
(Norway) Lyn	2	2	0	0	12	3	+9
(France) Lyon	4	2	1	1	7	6	+1
(Israel) Maccabi Haifa	1	1	0	0	7	2	+5
(England) Manchester City	2	1	1	0	4	4	0
(England) Manchester United	3	2	1	0	4	4	0
(Slovenia) Maribor	2	1	0	1	4	2	+2
(France) Marseille	2	2	0	0	4	1	+3
(Italy) Milan	6	2	1	3	4	3	+1
(France) Monaco	5	1	3	1	7	6	+1
(Slovenia) Mura	2	1	1	0	6	3	+3
(France) Nantes	2	1	0	1	1	0	+1
(Netherlands) NEC	1	1	0	0	1	0	+1
(Serbia) OFK Beograd	2	2	0	0	5	2	+3
(Greece) Olympiacos	4	2	1	1	10	5	+5
(Sweden) Östers IF	1	0	1	0	1	2	−1
(Portugal) Paços de Ferreira	2	1	1	0	3	1	2
(Greece) Panathinaikos	2	1	0	1	4	2	+2
(Greece) PAOK	2	0	1	1	1	2	−1
(France) Paris Saint-Germain	2	0	1	1	5	7	−2
(Serbia) Partizan	2	1	0	1	1	0	+1
(Portugal) Porto	2	1	0	1	2	1	+1
(Netherlands) PSV Eindhoven	4	2	1	1	5	4	+1
(Azerbaijan) Qarabağ	3	3	0	0	7	1	+6
(Scotland) Rangers	3	2	1	0	9	5	+4
(Romania) Rapid București	2	2	0	0	5	0	+5
(Germany) RB Leipzig	2	0	2	0	0	4	−4
(Spain) Real Madrid	6	1	3	2	4	8	−4
(Serbia) Red Star Belgrade	4	3	1	0	11	1	+10
(France) Rennes	2	0	1	1	2	5	−3
(Italy) Roma	1	0	0	1	2	2	0
(Russia) Rubin Kazan	2	1	1	0	1	1	0
(Slovenia) Rudar Velenje	1	1	0	0	2	1	+1
(Spain) Sevilla	2	0	1	1	3	4	−1
(Ukraine) Shakhtar Donetsk	2	0	1	1	1	3	−2
(Republic of Ireland) Shamrock Rovers	2	2	0	0	7	1	+6
(Moldova) Sheriff Tiraspol	2	2	0	0	4	1	+3
(North Macedonia) Shkëndija	1	1	0	0	3	1	+2
(Czech Republic) Slavia Prague	5	4	0	1	8	2	+6
(Slovakia) Slovan Bratislava	2	1	1	0	6	2	+4
(Russia) Spartak Moscow	1	0	0	1	2	2	0
(Portugal) Sporting CP	2	0	1	1	1	3	−2
(Austria) SV Stockerau	2	2	0	0	2	0	+2
(Norway) Tromsø	2	2	0	0	5	0	+5
(Netherlands) Twente	2	1	0	1	7	4	+3
(Italy) Udinese	1	0	1	0	0	2	−2
(Romania) UTA Arad	2	1	0	1	3	1	+2
(Spain) Villarreal	1	1	0	0	1	0	+1
(Netherlands) Vitesse	2	1	1	0	3	3	0
(Portugal) Vitória de Setúbal	2	1	1	0	2	2	0
(Germany) Werder Bremen	2	1	0	1	5	2	+3
(Poland) Wisła Kraków	2	1	0	1	3	2	+1
(Austria) Wolfsberger AC	2	2	0	0	8	1	+7
(England) Wolverhampton Wanderers	2	1	0	1	3	2	+1
(Switzerland) Young Boys	2	1	1	0	6	3	+3
(Moldova) Zimbru Chișinău	2	1	0	1	3	0	+3
Total	247	137	54	57	498	259	+239

== European finals ==
- Spurs' score listed first

Year	Date	Competition	Opposing Team	Score (*)	Venue	Manager	Captain(s)
1963	15 May	Cup Winners' Cup	(Spain) Atlético Madrid	5–1	(Netherlands) De Kuip, Rotterdam	(England) Bill Nicholson	(Northern Ireland) Danny Blanchflower
1972	1st leg: 3 May; 2nd leg: 17 May	UEFA Cup	(England) Wolverhampton Wanderers	3–2 agg.	(England) Molineux Stadium, Wolverhampton (England) White Hart Lane, London	(England) Bill Nicholson	(England) Alan Mullery
1974	1st leg: 22 May; 2nd leg: 29 May	UEFA Cup	(Netherlands) Feyenoord	2–4 agg.	(England) White Hart Lane, London (Netherlands) De Kuip, Rotterdam	(England) Bill Nicholson	(England) Martin Peters
1984	1st leg: 9 May; 2nd leg: 23 May	UEFA Cup	(Belgium) Anderlecht	2–2 agg. (4–2 p)	(Belgium) Constant Vanden Stock, Brussels (England) White Hart Lane, London	(England) Keith Burkinshaw	(England) Steve Perryman (England) Graham Roberts
2019	1 June	UEFA Champions League	(England) Liverpool	0–2	(Spain) Wanda Metropolitano, Madrid	(Argentina) Mauricio Pochettino	(France) Hugo Lloris
2025	21 May	UEFA Europa League	(England) Manchester United	1–0	(Spain) San Mamés, Bilbao	(Australia) Ange Postecoglou	(South Korea) Son Heung-min (Argentina) Cristian Romero
2025	13 August	UEFA Super Cup	(France) Paris Saint-Germain	2–2 (3–4 p)	(Italy) Stadio Friuli, Udine	(Denmark) Thomas Frank	(Argentina) Cristian Romero

== List of matches ==
Season	Competition	Round	Opponent	Home	Away	Agg.	Ref.
1961–62	European Cup	Preliminary round	(Poland) Górnik Zabrze	8–1	2–4	10–5	
1961–62	European Cup	First round	(Netherlands) Feyenoord	1–1	3–1	4–2	
1961–62	European Cup	Quarter-finals	(Czechoslovakia) Dukla Prague	4–1	0–1	4–2	
1961–62	European Cup	Semi-finals	(Portugal) Benfica	2–1	1–3	3–4	
1962–63	Cup Winners' Cup	First round	(Scotland) Rangers	5–2	3–2	8–4	
1962–63	Cup Winners' Cup	Quarter-finals	(Czechoslovakia) Slovan Bratislava	6–0	0–2	6–2	
1962–63	Cup Winners' Cup	Semi-finals	(Socialist Federal Republic of Yugoslavia) OFK Beograd	3–1	2–1	5–2	
1962–63	Cup Winners' Cup	Final	(Spain) Atlético Madrid	N/A	N/A	5–1	
1963–64	Cup Winners' Cup	Second round	(England) Manchester United	2–0	1–4	3–4	
1967–68	Cup Winners' Cup	First round	(Socialist Federal Republic of Yugoslavia) Hajduk Split	4–3	2–0	6–3	
1967–68	Cup Winners' Cup	Second round	(France) Lyon	4–3	0–1	4–4 (a)	
1971–72	UEFA Cup	First round	(Iceland) Keflavík	9–0	6–1	15–1	
1971–72	UEFA Cup	Second round	(France) Nantes	1–0	0–0	1–0	
1971–72	UEFA Cup	Third round	(Romania) Rapid București	3–0	2–0	5–0	
1971–72	UEFA Cup	Quarter-finals	(Romania) UTA Arad	1–1	2–0	3–1	
1971–72	UEFA Cup	Semi-finals	(Italy) Milan	2–1	1–1	3–2	
1971–72	UEFA Cup	Final	(England) Wolverhampton Wanderers	1–1	2–1	3–2	
1972–73	UEFA Cup	First round	(Norway) Lyn	6–0	6–3	12–3	
1972–73	UEFA Cup	Second round	(Greece) Olympiacos	4–0	0–1	4–1	
1972–73	UEFA Cup	Third round	(Socialist Federal Republic of Yugoslavia) Red Star Belgrade	2–0	0–1	2–1	
1972–73	UEFA Cup	Quarter-finals	(Portugal) Vitória de Setúbal	1–0	1–2	2–2 (a)	
1972–73	UEFA Cup	Semi-finals	(England) Liverpool	2–1	0–1	2–2 (a)	
1973–74	UEFA Cup	First round	(Switzerland) Grasshopper	4–1	5–1	9–2	
1973–74	UEFA Cup	Second round	(Scotland) Aberdeen	4–1	1–1	5–2	
1973–74	UEFA Cup	Third round	(Soviet Union) Dinamo Tbilisi	5–1	1–1	6–2	
1973–74	UEFA Cup	Quarter-finals	(West Germany) 1. FC Köln	3–0	2–1	5–1	
1973–74	UEFA Cup	Semi-finals	(East Germany) Lokomotive Leipzig	2–0	2–1	4–1	
1973–74	UEFA Cup	Final	(Netherlands) Feyenoord	2–2	0–2	2–4	
1981–82	Cup Winners' Cup	First round	(Netherlands) Ajax	3–0	3–1	6–1	
1981–82	Cup Winners' Cup	Second round	(Republic of Ireland) Dundalk	1–0	1–1	2–1	
1981–82	Cup Winners' Cup	Quarter-finals	(West Germany) Eintracht Frankfurt	2–0	1–2	3–2	
1981–82	Cup Winners' Cup	Semi-finals	(Spain) Barcelona	1–1	0–1	1–2	
1982–83	Cup Winners' Cup	First round	(Northern Ireland) Coleraine	4–0	3–0	7–0	
1982–83	Cup Winners' Cup	Second round	(West Germany) Bayern Munich	1–1	1–4	2–5	
1983–84	UEFA Cup	First round	(Republic of Ireland) Drogheda United	8–0	6–0	14–0	
1983–84	UEFA Cup	Second round	(Netherlands) Feyenoord	4–2	2–0	6–2	
1983–84	UEFA Cup	Third round	(West Germany) Bayern Munich	2–0	0–1	2–1	
1983–84	UEFA Cup	Quarter-finals	Austria Wien	2–0	2–2	4–2	
1983–84	UEFA Cup	Semi-finals	(Socialist Federal Republic of Yugoslavia) Hajduk Split	1–0	1–2	2–2 (a)	
1983–84	UEFA Cup	Final	(Belgium) Anderlecht	1–1 (a.e.t.)	1–1	2–2 (4–3 p)	
1984–85	UEFA Cup	First round	(Portugal) Braga	6–0	3–0	9–0	
1984–85	UEFA Cup	Second round	(Belgium) Club Brugge	3–0	1–2	4–2	
1984–85	UEFA Cup	Third round	(Czechoslovakia) Bohemians Prague	2–0	1–1	3–1	
1984–85	UEFA Cup	Quarter-finals	(Spain) Real Madrid	0–1	0–0	0–1	
1991–92	Cup Winners' Cup	Qualifying round	(Austria) SV Stockerau	1–0	1–0	2–0	
1991–92	Cup Winners' Cup	First round	(Socialist Federal Republic of Yugoslavia) Hajduk Split	2–0	0–1	2–1	
1991–92	Cup Winners' Cup	Second round	(Portugal) Porto	3–1	0–0	3–1	
1991–92	Cup Winners' Cup	Quarter-finals	(Netherlands) Feyenoord	0–0	0–1	0–1	
1995–96	UEFA Intertoto Cup	Group 2	(Switzerland) Lucerne	0–2	N/A	–	
1995–96	UEFA Intertoto Cup	Group 2	(Slovenia) Rudar Velenje	N/A	2–1	–	
1995–96	UEFA Intertoto Cup	Group 2	(Sweden) Östers IF	1–2	N/A	–	
1995–96	UEFA Intertoto Cup	Group 2	(Germany) 1. FC Köln	N/A	0–8	–	
1999–2000	UEFA Cup	First round	(Moldova) Zimbru Chișinău	3–0	0–0	3–0	
1999–2000	UEFA Cup	Second round	(Germany) 1. FC Kaiserslautern	1–0	0–2	1–2	
2006–07	UEFA Cup	First round	(Czech Republic) Slavia Prague	1–0	1–0	2–0	
2006–07	UEFA Cup	Group B	(Turkey) Beşiktaş	N/A	2–0	–	
2006–07	UEFA Cup	Group B	(Belgium) Club Brugge	3–1	N/A	–	
2006–07	UEFA Cup	Group B	(Germany) Bayer Leverkusen	N/A	1–0	–	
2006–07	UEFA Cup	Group B	(Romania) Dinamo București	3–1	N/A	–	
2006–07	UEFA Cup	Round of 32	(Netherlands) Feyenoord	N/A	N/A	Bye	
2006–07	UEFA Cup	Round of 16	(Portugal) Braga	3–2	3–2	6–4	
2006–07	UEFA Cup	Quarter-finals	(Spain) Sevilla	2–2	1–2	3–4	
2007–08	UEFA Cup	First round	(Cyprus) Anorthosis Famagusta	6–1	1–1	7–2	
2007–08	UEFA Cup	Group G	(Spain) Getafe	1–2	N/A	–	
2007–08	UEFA Cup	Group G	(Israel) Hapoel Tel Aviv	N/A	2–0	–	
2007–08	UEFA Cup	Group G	(Denmark) AaB	3–2	N/A	–	
2007–08	UEFA Cup	Group G	(Belgium) Anderlecht	N/A	1–1	–	
2007–08	UEFA Cup	Round of 32	(Czech Republic) Slavia Prague	1–1	2–1	3–2	
2007–08	UEFA Cup	Round of 16	(Netherlands) PSV Eindhoven	0–1	1–0 (a.e.t.)	1–1 (5–6 p)	
2008–09	UEFA Cup	First round	(Poland) Wisła Kraków	2–1	1–1	3–2	
2008–09	UEFA Cup	Group D	(Italy) Udinese	N/A	0–2	–	
2008–09	UEFA Cup	Group D	(Croatia) Dinamo Zagreb	4–0	N/A	–	
2008–09	UEFA Cup	Group D	(Netherlands) NEC	N/A	1–0	–	
2008–09	UEFA Cup	Group D	(Russia) Spartak Moscow	2–2	N/A	–	
2008–09	UEFA Cup	Round of 32	(Ukraine) Shakhtar Donetsk	1–1	0–2	1–3	
2010–11	UEFA Champions League	Play-off round	(Switzerland) Young Boys	4–0	2–3	6–3	
2010–11	UEFA Champions League	Group A	(Germany) Werder Bremen	3–0	2–2	–	
2010–11	UEFA Champions League	Group A	(Netherlands) Twente	4–1	3–3	–	
2010–11	UEFA Champions League	Group A	(Italy) Inter Milan	3–1	3–4	–	
2010–11	UEFA Champions League	Round of 16	(Italy) Milan	0–0	1–0	1–0	
2010–11	UEFA Champions League	Quarter-finals	(Spain) Real Madrid	0–1	0–4	0–5	
2011–12	UEFA Europa League	Play-off round	(Scotland) Heart of Midlothian	0–0	5–0	5–0	
2011–12	UEFA Europa League	Group A	(Greece) PAOK	1–2	0–0	–	
2011–12	UEFA Europa League	Group A	(Russia) Rubin Kazan	1–0	0–1	–	
2011–12	UEFA Europa League	Group A	(Republic of Ireland) Shamrock Rovers	3–1	4–0	–	
2012–13	UEFA Europa League	Group J	(Italy) Lazio	0–0	0–0	–	
2012–13	UEFA Europa League	Group J	(Greece) Panathinaikos	1–1	3–1	–	
2012–13	UEFA Europa League	Group J	(Slovenia) Maribor	1–1	3–1	–	
2012–13	UEFA Europa League	Round of 32	(France) Lyon	2–1	1–1	3–2	
2012–13	UEFA Europa League	Round of 16	(Italy) Inter Milan	3–0	1–4 (a.e.t.)	4–4 (a)	
2012–13	UEFA Europa League	Quarter-finals	(Switzerland) Basel	2–2	2–2 (a.e.t.)	4–4 (1–4 p)	
2013–14	UEFA Europa League	Play-off round	(Georgia (country)) Dinamo Tbilisi	3–0	5–0	8–0	
2013–14	UEFA Europa League	Group K	(Russia) Anzhi Makhachkala	4–1	2–0	–	
2013–14	UEFA Europa League	Group K	(Moldova) Sheriff Tiraspol	2–1	2–0	–	
2013–14	UEFA Europa League	Group K	(Norway) Tromsø	3–0	2–0	–	
2013–14	UEFA Europa League	Round of 32	(Ukraine) Dnipro Dnipropetrovsk	3–1	0–1	3–2	
2013–14	UEFA Europa League	Round of 16	(Portugal) Benfica	1–3	2–2	3–5	
2014–15	UEFA Europa League	Play-off round	(Cyprus) AEL Limassol	3–0	2–1	5–1	
2014–15	UEFA Europa League	Group C	(Turkey) Beşiktaş	1–1	0–1	–	
2014–15	UEFA Europa League	Group C	(Serbia) Partizan	1–0	0–0	–	
2014–15	UEFA Europa League	Group C	(Greece) Asteras Tripolis	5–1	2–1	–	
2014–15	UEFA Europa League	Round of 32	(Italy) Fiorentina	1–1	0–2	1–3	
2015–16	UEFA Europa League	Group J	(Belgium) Anderlecht	2–1	1–2	–	
2015–16	UEFA Europa League	Group J	(France) Monaco	4–1	1–1	–	
2015–16	UEFA Europa League	Group J	(Azerbaijan) Qarabağ	3–1	1–0	–	
2015–16	UEFA Europa League	Round of 32	(Italy) Fiorentina	3–0	1–1	4–1	
2015–16	UEFA Europa League	Round of 16	(Germany) Borussia Dortmund	1–2	0–3	1–5	
2016–17	UEFA Champions League	Group E	(France) Monaco	1–2	1–2	–	
2016–17	UEFA Champions League	Group E	(Russia) CSKA Moscow	3–1	1–0	–	
2016–17	UEFA Champions League	Group E	(Germany) Bayer Leverkusen	0–1	0–0	–	
2016–17	UEFA Europa League	Round of 32	(Belgium) Gent	2–2	0–1	2–3	
2017–18	UEFA Champions League	Group H	(Spain) Real Madrid	3–1	1–1	–	
2017–18	UEFA Champions League	Group H	(Germany) Borussia Dortmund	3–1	2–1	–	
2017–18	UEFA Champions League	Group H	(Cyprus) APOEL	3–0	3–0	–	
2017–18	UEFA Champions League	Round of 16	(Italy) Juventus	1–2	2–2	3–4	
2018–19	UEFA Champions League	Group B	(Italy) Inter Milan	1–0	1–2	–	
2018–19	UEFA Champions League	Group B	(Spain) Barcelona	2–4	1–1	–	
2018–19	UEFA Champions League	Group B	(Netherlands) PSV Eindhoven	2–1	2–2	–	
2018–19	UEFA Champions League	Round of 16	(Germany) Borussia Dortmund	3–0	1–0	4–0	
2018–19	UEFA Champions League	Quarter-finals	(England) Manchester City	1–0	3–4	4–4 (a)	
2018–19	UEFA Champions League	Semi-finals	(Netherlands) Ajax	0–1	3–2	3–3 (a)	
2018–19	UEFA Champions League	Final	(England) Liverpool	N/A	N/A	0–2	
2019–20	UEFA Champions League	Group B	(Greece) Olympiacos	4–2	2–2	–	
2019–20	UEFA Champions League	Group B	(Germany) Bayern Munich	2–7	1–3	–	
2019–20	UEFA Champions League	Group B	(Serbia) Red Star Belgrade	5–0	4–0	–	
2019–20	UEFA Champions League	Round of 16	(Germany) RB Leipzig	0–1	0–3	0–4	
2020–21	UEFA Europa League	Second qualifying round	(Bulgaria) Lokomotiv Plovdiv	N/A	2–1	N/A	
2020–21	UEFA Europa League	Third qualifying round	(North Macedonia) Shkëndija	N/A	3–1	N/A	
2020–21	UEFA Europa League	Play-off round	(Israel) Maccabi Haifa	7–2	N/A	N/A	
2020–21	UEFA Europa League	Group J	(Bulgaria) Ludogorets Razgrad	4–0	3–1	–	
2020–21	UEFA Europa League	Group J	(Austria) LASK	3–0	3–3	–	
2020–21	UEFA Europa League	Group J	(Belgium) Antwerp	2–0	0–1	–	
2020–21	UEFA Europa League	Round of 32	(Austria) Wolfsberger AC	4–0	4–1	8–1	
2020–21	UEFA Europa League	Round of 16	(Croatia) Dinamo Zagreb	2–0	0–3 (a.e.t.)	2–3	
2021–22	UEFA Europa Conference League	Play-off round	(Portugal) Paços de Ferreira	3–0	0–1	3–1	
2021–22	UEFA Europa Conference League	Group G	(France) Rennes	0–3 (awd.)	2–2	–	
2021–22	UEFA Europa Conference League	Group G	(Netherlands) Vitesse	3–2	0–1	–	
2021–22	UEFA Europa Conference League	Group G	(Slovenia) Mura	5–1	1–2	–	
2022–23	UEFA Champions League	Group D	(France) Marseille	2–0	2–1	–	
2022–23	UEFA Champions League	Group D	(Portugal) Sporting CP	1–1	0–2	–	
2022–23	UEFA Champions League	Group D	(Germany) Eintracht Frankfurt	3–2	0–0	–	
2022–23	UEFA Champions League	Round of 16	(Italy) Milan	0–0	0–1	0–1	
2024–25	UEFA Europa League	League phase	(Azerbaijan) Qarabağ	3–0	N/A	–	
2024–25	UEFA Europa League	League phase	(Hungary) Ferencváros	N/A	2–1	–	
2024–25	UEFA Europa League	League phase	(Netherlands) AZ	1–0	N/A	–	
2024–25	UEFA Europa League	League phase	(Turkey) Galatasaray	N/A	2–3	–	
2024–25	UEFA Europa League	League phase	(Italy) Roma	2–2	N/A	–	
2024–25	UEFA Europa League	League phase	(Scotland) Rangers	N/A	1–1	–	
2024–25	UEFA Europa League	League phase	(Germany) TSG Hoffenheim	N/A	3–2	–	
2024–25	UEFA Europa League	League phase	(Sweden) IF Elfsborg	3–0	N/A	–	
2024–25	UEFA Europa League	Round of 16	(Netherlands) AZ	3–1	0–1	3–2	
2024–25	UEFA Europa League	Quarter-finals	(Germany) Eintracht Frankfurt	1–1	1–0	2–1	
2024–25	UEFA Europa League	Semi-finals	(Norway) Bodø/Glimt	3–1	2–0	5–1	
2024–25	UEFA Europa League	Final	(England) Manchester United	N/A	N/A	1–0	
2025–26	UEFA Super Cup	Final	(France) Paris Saint-Germain	N/A	N/A	2–2 (3–4 p)	
2025–26	UEFA Champions League	League phase	(Spain) Villarreal	1–0	N/A	–	
2025–26	UEFA Champions League	League phase	(Norway) Bodø/Glimt	N/A	2–2	–	
2025–26	UEFA Champions League	League phase	(France) Monaco	N/A	0–0	–	
2025–26	UEFA Champions League	League phase	(Denmark) Copenhagen	4–0	N/A	–	
2025–26	UEFA Champions League	League phase	(France) Paris Saint-Germain	N/A	3–5	–	
2025–26	UEFA Champions League	League phase	(Czech Republic) Slavia Prague	3–0	N/A	–	
2025–26	UEFA Champions League	League phase	(Germany) Borussia Dortmund	2–0	N/A	–	
2025–26	UEFA Champions League	League phase	(Germany) Eintracht Frankfurt	N/A	2–0	–	
2025–26	UEFA Champions League	Round of 16	(Spain) Atlético Madrid	3–2	2–5	5–7	

Last updated: 18 March 2026
Note: Tottenham score always listed first.
