= 2019 UEFA Champions League final =

Football match in Madrid, Spain

- Match programme cover
- Event: 2018–19 UEFA Champions League
Tottenham Hotspur	Liverpool
(England)	(England)
0	2
- Date: 1 June 2019
- Venue: Estadio Metropolitano, Madrid
- Man of the Match: Virgil van Dijk (Liverpool)
- Referee: Damir Skomina (Slovenia)
- Attendance: 63,272
- Weather: Sunny; 30 °C (86 °F); 15% humidity

The 2019 UEFA Champions League final was the final match of the 2018–19 UEFA Champions League, the 64th season of Europe's premier club football tournament organised by UEFA and the 27th season since it was rebranded the UEFA Champions League. It was played at the Estadio Metropolitano in Madrid, Spain on 1 June 2019, between English sides Tottenham Hotspur (in their first and to date, only appearance) and Liverpool (in their ninth overall and their second in a row, having been defeated by Real Madrid in 2018). It was the seventh Champions League final – and the fourth of the decade – to feature two teams from the same association, and the second all-English final (the first was in 2008). It was also the first final since 2013 to not feature at least one Spanish team, with Real Madrid and Barcelona having shared the previous five titles between them.

Liverpool won the final 2–0, with a penalty which was scored after 106 seconds by Mohamed Salah, and a goal by substitute Divock Origi after 87 minutes. As winners, for the sixth time in their history, Liverpool earned the right to play in the 2019 FIFA Club World Cup, as well as against Chelsea, the winners of the 2018–19 UEFA Europa League, in the 2019 UEFA Super Cup, winning in both competitions. They also secured qualification for the group stage of the 2019–20 UEFA Champions League. As Liverpool had already qualified through their league position, the reserved berth was given to Red Bull Salzburg, the champions of the 2018–19 Austrian Bundesliga, the 11th-ranked association according to next season's access list.

In March 2018, UEFA announced that a fourth substitution would be allowed in extra time and that the number of substitutes would be increased from 7 to 12. The kick-off time was also changed from 20:45 CEST to 21:00 CEST. The match was also the first Champions League final to use the video assistant referee (VAR) system.

== Venue ==
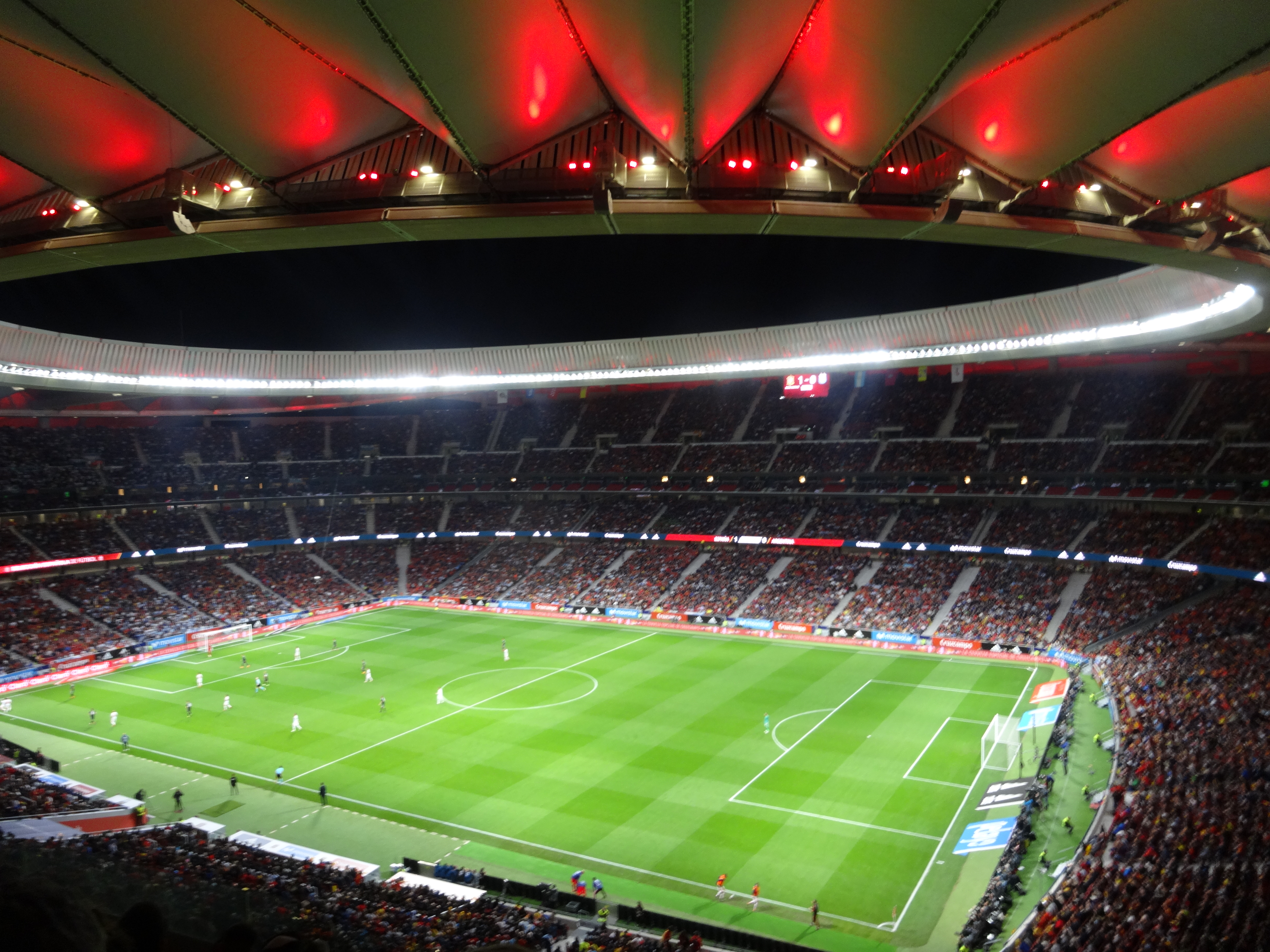
The Estadio Metropolitano in Madrid hosted the final.

This was the fifth European Cup/UEFA Champions League final held in Madrid, after the 1957, 1969, 1980 and 2010 finals, all held at the Estadio Santiago Bernabéu.

The 67,000-seat Estadio Metropolitano is the home of Atlético Madrid, who have occupied it since major renovations were completed in September 2017. Due to UEFA regulations regarding naming rights of non-tournament sponsors, the stadium was referred to as the "Estadio Metropolitano" in all UEFA materials.

=== Host selection ===
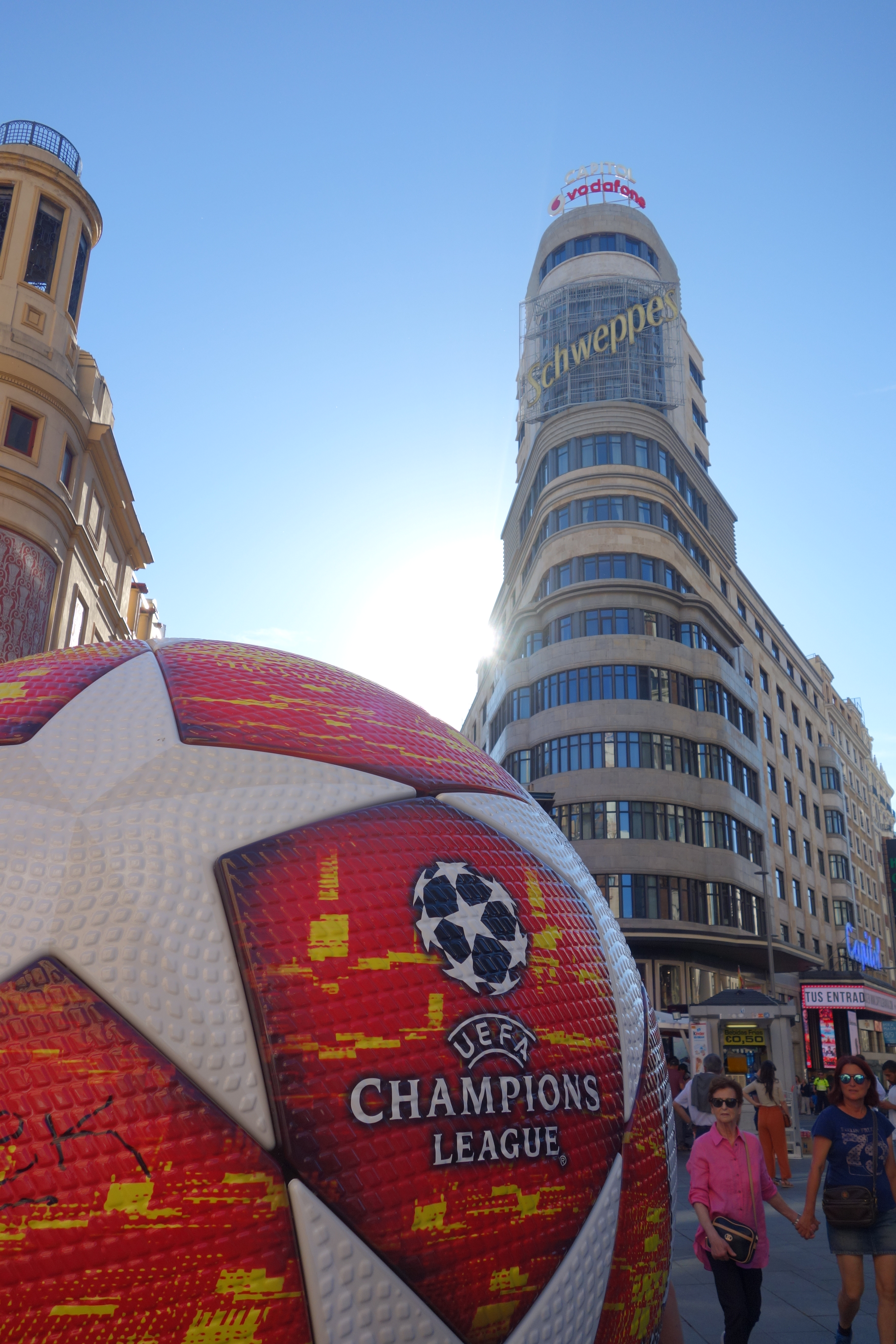
Callao Square in Madrid prior to the final

For the first time, UEFA launched an open bidding process to select the venues of the club competition finals (UEFA Champions League, UEFA Europa League, UEFA Women's Champions League and UEFA Super Cup). The bidding process was opened on 9 December 2016 and associations were given until 27 January 2017 to express interest and 6 June 2017 to submit bid dossiers to UEFA.

Bidding associations for 2019 UEFA Champions League final
Association	Stadium	City	Capacity	Notes
Azerbaijan	Baku Olympic Stadium	Baku	68,700	Also bid to host the 2019 UEFA Europa League Final.
Spain	Estadio Metropolitano	Madrid	67,000	

UEFA announced on 3 February 2017 that the associations of Azerbaijan and Spain had expressed interest in hosting the Champions League final. On 7 June 2017, UEFA confirmed that they submitted bids for the 2019 UEFA Champions League final, with Azerbaijan proposing the 68,700-seat Baku Olympic Stadium and Spain proposing the then-unfinished Estadio Wanda Metropolitano, which would hold 67,000 spectators. The bid evaluation report was published by UEFA on 14 September 2017. The Wanda Metropolitano was selected as the venue by the UEFA Executive Committee on 20 September 2017, while the Baku Olympic Stadium was successful in its bid to host the 2019 UEFA Europa League Final.

== Background ==
Tottenham Hotspur reached their first ever Champions League final, becoming the eighth unique finalist from England and the fortieth overall. They were the first final debutants since fellow English and London club Chelsea in 2008. It was the fifth time they had appeared in the final of a UEFA competition, having played in one Cup Winners' Cup final (winning in 1963 to become the first British team to win a European trophy) and three UEFA Cup finals (winning in 1972 and 1984 and losing in 1974). Had they won the final, they would have become the third English club, as well as the sixth club overall, to have won all three pre-1999 major European trophies (European Cup/Champions League, UEFA Cup/Europa League and the now-defunct Cup Winners' Cup).

In eight matches, they had a record of four wins, one draw and three losses in European competitions against fellow English clubs. Of the four ties, Tottenham won two: against Manchester City in this season's quarter-finals, and against Wolverhampton Wanderers in the 1972 UEFA Cup final, the inaugural final of the competition, becoming the first British team to win two different European trophies.

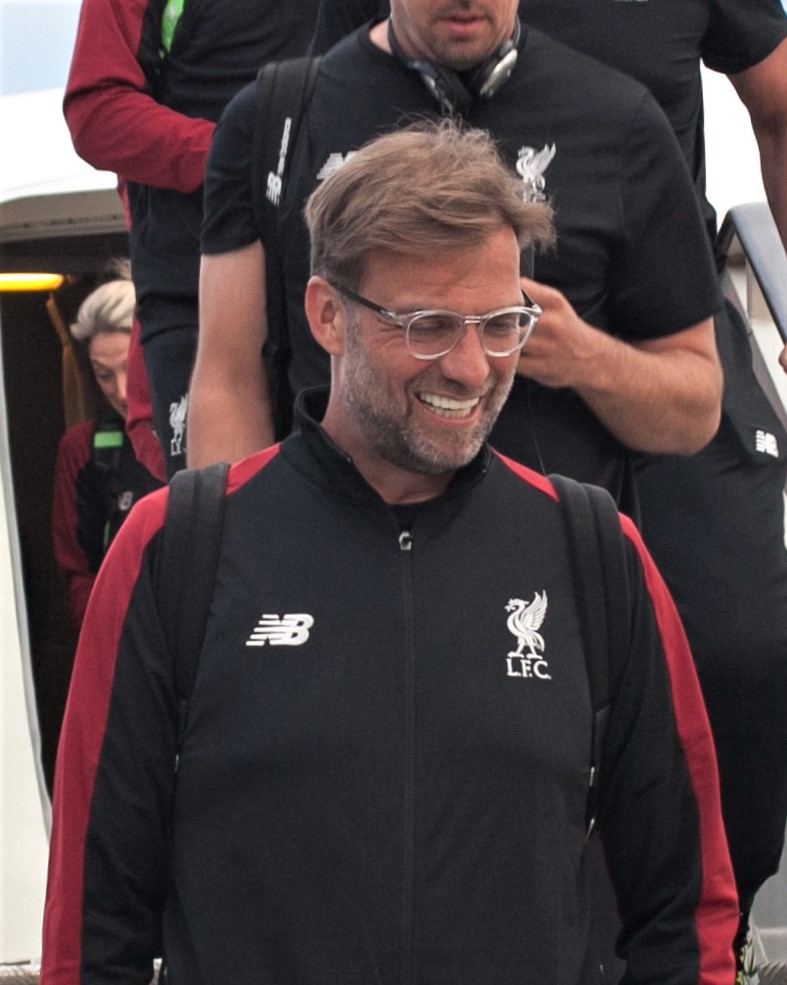
Liverpool manager Jürgen Klopp won his first Champions League title in his third final.

Liverpool reached their ninth overall final, an English record, as well as their second in a row, having lost to Real Madrid in 2018. They had won the competition on five occasions (1977, 1978, 1981, 1984 and 2005) and lost three times (1985, 2007 and 2018). This was also their 14th final in UEFA competitions, having played in one Cup Winners' Cup final (losing in 1966) and four UEFA Cup/Europa League finals (winning in 1973, 1976 and 2001, and losing in 2016). In twenty matches, Liverpool had a record of seven wins, eight draws (one of which they won on penalties) and five losses in European competitions against fellow English clubs. Most recently, they won both legs against Manchester City in the 2017–18 Champions League quarter-finals. The match was the third Champions League final for manager Jürgen Klopp, who had lost both previous finals, with Borussia Dortmund in 2013 and with Liverpool in 2018.

The final was the 171st competitive meeting between Tottenham Hotspur and Liverpool, with a record of 79 Liverpool wins, 48 Tottenham wins and 43 draws. Liverpool won both league fixtures during the 2018–19 Premier League season 2–1 at Wembley and Anfield. They had faced each other once before in a European tie, meeting in the semi-final of the 1972–73 UEFA Cup; Liverpool won the first leg 1–0 at Anfield and Tottenham won the second leg at White Hart Lane 2–1, though Liverpool advanced to the final on away goals, before beating Borussia Mönchengladbach in the final. Domestically, the sides had met once in a cup final, with Liverpool winning 3–1 after extra time in the 1982 Football League Cup final. Both managers were seeking their first major title with their respective clubs.

The match was the first final since 2013 not to feature a Spanish team, with Real Madrid (2014, 2016, 2017 and 2018) and Barcelona (2015) having won the previous five seasons of the competition. It was also the first final to be won by an English team since Chelsea in 2012, as well as the second all-English final, after Manchester United and Chelsea in Moscow in 2008. Overall, the match was the seventh final to feature two teams from the same association, previously achieved on three occasions by Spanish teams (2000, 2014 and 2016), and once by Italian (2003) and German (2013) teams, in addition to English in 2008.

As Chelsea and Arsenal also reached the 2019 UEFA Europa League Final, this was the first season to have multiple finals of major European club competitions featuring teams from a single nation.

=== Previous finals ===
In the following table, finals until 1992 were in the European Cup era, since 1993 were in the UEFA Champions League era.

Team	Previous final appearances (bold indicates winners)
(England) Tottenham Hotspur	None
(England) Liverpool	8 (**1977**, **1978**, **1981**, **1984**, 1985, **2005**, 2007, 2018)

== Route to the final ==
Note: In all results below, the score of the finalist is given first (H: home; A: away).

(England) Tottenham Hotspur				Round	(England) Liverpool			
Opponent	Result			Group stage	Opponent	Result		
(Italy) Inter Milan	1–2 (A)			Matchday 1	(France) Paris Saint-Germain	3–2 (H)		
(Spain) Barcelona	2–4 (H)			Matchday 2	(Italy) Napoli	0–1 (A)		
(Netherlands) PSV Eindhoven	2–2 (A)			Matchday 3	(Serbia) Red Star Belgrade	4–0 (H)		
(Netherlands) PSV Eindhoven	2–1 (H)			Matchday 4	(Serbia) Red Star Belgrade	0–2 (A)		
(Italy) Inter Milan	1–0 (H)			Matchday 5	(France) Paris Saint-Germain	1–2 (A)		
(Spain) Barcelona	1–1 (A)			Matchday 6	(Italy) Napoli	1–0 (H)		
Group B runners-up: Pos / Team / Pld / Pts; 1 / (Spain) Barcelona / 6 / 14; 2 / (England) Tottenham Hotspur / 6 / 8; 3 / (Italy) Inter Milan / 6 / 8; 4 / (Netherlands) PSV Eindhoven / 6 / 2; Source: UEFA				Final standings	Group C runners-up: Pos / Team / Pld / Pts; 1 / (France) Paris Saint-Germain / 6 / 11; 2 / (England) Liverpool / 6 / 9; 3 / (Italy) Napoli / 6 / 9; 4 / (Serbia) Red Star Belgrade / 6 / 4; Source: UEFA			
Opponent	Agg.	1st leg	2nd leg	Knockout phase	Opponent	Agg.	1st leg	2nd leg
(Germany) Borussia Dortmund	4–0	3–0 (H)	1–0 (A)	Round of 16	(Germany) Bayern Munich	3–1	0–0 (H)	3–1 (A)
(England) Manchester City	4–4 (a)	1–0 (H)	3–4 (A)	Quarter-finals	(Portugal) Porto	6–1	2–0 (H)	4–1 (A)
(Netherlands) Ajax	3–3 (a)	0–1 (H)	3–2 (A)	Semi-finals	(Spain) Barcelona	4–3	0–3 (A)	4–0 (H)

=== Tottenham Hotspur ===
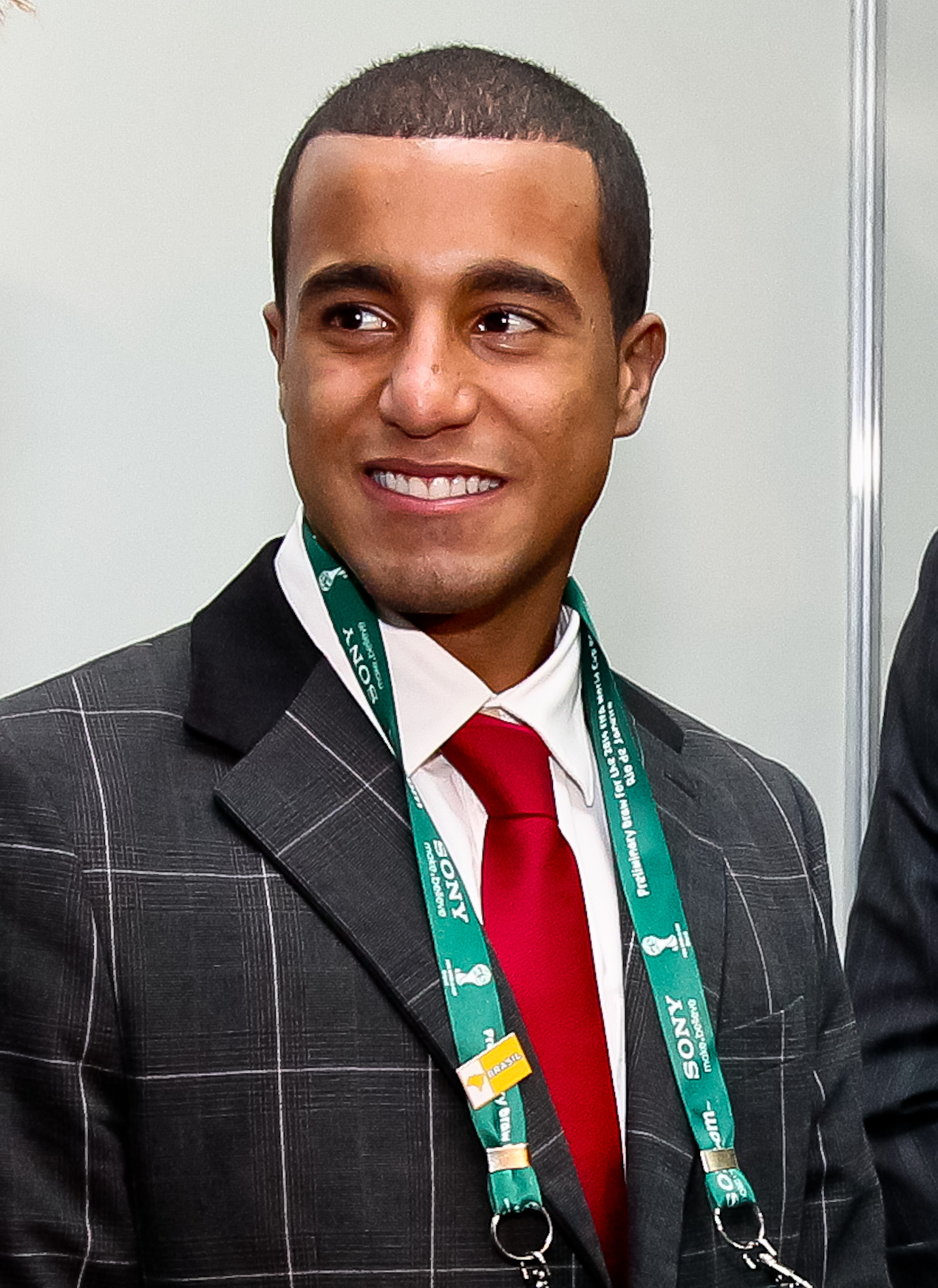
Lucas Moura scored a hat-trick in the second leg of the semi-final against Ajax to send Tottenham to the final.

Tottenham Hotspur, making their first appearance in a European competition final since 1984 and their first ever in the European Cup final, qualified directly for the 2018–19 UEFA Champions League group stage as the third-placed team in the 2017–18 Premier League. They were drawn into Group B alongside Spanish champions Barcelona, Dutch champions PSV Eindhoven and Inter Milan of Italy, all of whom are former European champions.

Spurs began their Champions League campaign at the San Siro in Milan, where they lost 2–1 to Inter after conceding twice in the final minutes of the match. At Wembley Stadium in London, the club's temporary home, Tottenham lost 4–2 to Barcelona and fell to third place in Group B. Spurs drew 2–2 with PSV Eindhoven on matchday 3, played in the Netherlands, but lost goalkeeper Hugo Lloris to a red card and conceded a late equalising goal to Luuk de Jong in the 87th minute. Tottenham conceded early to PSV in the home leg at Wembley, but two goals from Harry Kane late in the second half gave the team their first Champions League win of the season. Against Inter at Wembley, substitute Christian Eriksen's 80th-minute goal gave Spurs a 1–0 victory and prevented the club from being eliminated. The final group stage match against Barcelona at Camp Nou began with an early goal for the home side, but a late equaliser by Lucas Moura preserved a 1–1 draw for Tottenham. The team finished level on points with Inter, but advanced to the knockout stage on head-to-head away goals as group runners-up to Barcelona.

Tottenham faced German club Borussia Dortmund in the round of 16, marking the second time in three years that the two teams had met in a European competition. Spurs won 3–0 with a dominant performance in the first leg at home, highlighted by second-half goals from Son Heung-min, Jan Vertonghen and Fernando Llorente. The second leg at the Westfalenstadion in Dortmund ended as a 1–0 win for the visitors, with a goal by Harry Kane early in the second half bringing the tie to 4–0 on aggregate and sending Tottenham to the quarter-finals.

The club was drawn in the quarter-finals against their compatriots and reigning English champions Manchester City, with two legs scheduled within 11 days of a Premier League fixture between the clubs. Tottenham hosted the first leg, the first European tie at the newly-completed Tottenham Hotspur Stadium, and won 1–0 thanks to a goal scored by Son Heung-min in the 78th minute, following an earlier penalty from City's Sergio Agüero in the first half that was saved by Hugo Lloris. Manchester City took an early 3–2 lead within 21 minutes to open the second leg, including two goals apiece for Son and City's Raheem Sterling and an additional goal scored by Bernardo Silva. Agüero's goal in the 59th minute gave Manchester City a 4–3 lead on aggregate in the series, but Fernando Llorente scored in the 73rd minute to tie the series once again and give Tottenham an advantage on away goals. Sterling scored a fifth goal for City in the third minute of stoppage time, but it was ruled out by the video assistant referee for an offside during the buildup to the goal, giving Tottenham a victory on away goals to send them to their first European Cup semi-final since 1962.

In the semi-finals, Tottenham faced Dutch club Ajax, who had won the European Cup four times. A resurgent Ajax had entered the competition through the qualifying rounds with a young squad and went on to eliminate reigning holders Real Madrid in the round of 16 and Juventus in the quarter-finals. Spurs, missing forwards Harry Kane and Son Heung-min, among others, to injuries, lost 1–0 in the first leg at home, Ajax's lone goal coming in the 15th minute from Donny van de Beek. Ajax began the second leg at their Johan Cruyff Arena with goals from Matthijs de Ligt and Hakim Ziyech to extend their aggregate lead to 3–0 at half-time. Tottenham manager Mauricio Pochettino substituted defensive midfielder Victor Wanyama for striker Fernando Llorente at half-time, and his strike partner, Lucas Moura, scored the team's first goal of the semi-final in the 55th minute. Moura then scored a second goal five minutes later, his tight footwork helping him beat several Ajax players after an initial save by goalkeeper André Onana. After Tottenham failed to convert several chances to level the tie, the match entered five minutes of stoppage time. As the clock passed the five-minute mark, Moura completed his hat-trick with a first-time shot from just inside the penalty area to make the score 3–3 on aggregate and put Spurs through to the final on away goals. The second leg was hailed as one of the greatest comebacks in Champions League history, alongside Liverpool's semi-final played the day before.

=== Liverpool ===
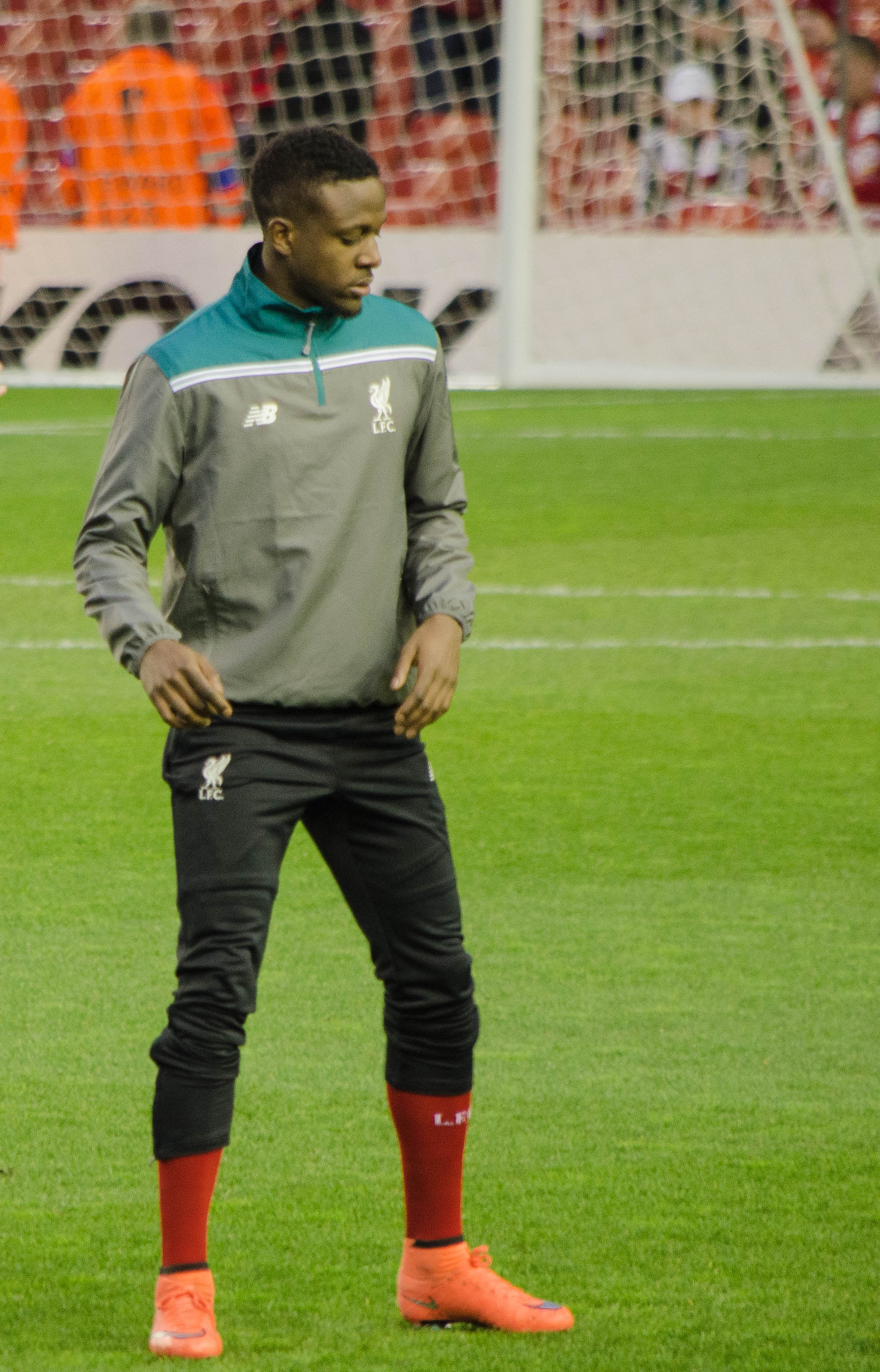
Divock Origi's brace in the second leg of the semi-final against Barcelona helped Liverpool reach the final.

Liverpool, the runners-up in the previous year's final, qualified directly for the group stage as the fourth-placed team in the Premier League. They were drawn into Group C alongside French champions Paris Saint-Germain, Napoli of Italy and Serbian champions Red Star Belgrade, who qualified through the play-off round and were making their Champions League group stage debut.

In the opening match of the group stage, Liverpool faced Paris Saint-Germain at Anfield and won 3–2 with a goal in stoppage time by substitute Roberto Firmino. Liverpool failed to produce a shot on target during their 1–0 loss to Napoli at the Stadio San Paolo on matchday 2, which the home side won with a 90th-minute goal from Lorenzo Insigne. Liverpool retook their position at the top of Group C following a 4–0 home victory over Red Star Belgrade on 24 October, including a brace from Mohamed Salah, but suffered a shock 2–0 defeat to Red Star two weeks later in Belgrade and fell to second place behind Napoli.

At the Parc des Princes in Paris, Liverpool were defeated 2–1 by Paris Saint-Germain and fell to third place in the group, putting them in jeopardy of a group stage elimination. Liverpool won their final group stage match, played on 11 December against Napoli at Anfield, with Salah scoring the only goal of the game. Liverpool goalkeeper Alisson saved Arkadiusz Milik's shot from eight yards out deep into second half injury time to preserve a clean sheet. Liverpool remained tied with Napoli on points, head-to-head record and goal difference but advanced to the knockout phase on total goals scored, with nine goals to Napoli's seven.

Liverpool were matched against German champions Bayern Munich in the round of 16 and played to a scoreless draw in the first leg at Anfield, mirroring the two sides' semi-final tie in the 1980–81 European Cup. They advanced to the quarter-finals by defeating Bayern 3–1 in the second leg at the Allianz Arena, with two goals from Sadio Mané and one from Virgil van Dijk in the second half. Liverpool won their quarter-final tie against Portuguese club Porto with an aggregate score of 6–1, winning 2–0 in the first leg at home and 4–1 away at the Estádio do Dragão.

In the semi-finals, Liverpool faced tournament favourites Barcelona. Former Liverpool forwards Luis Suárez and Philippe Coutinho were playing against their old club for the first time competitively since being sold to Barça for record transfer fees in 2014 and 2018, respectively. Barcelona took advantage of several missed chances from Liverpool's strikers and won 3–0 at home, with two second-half goals by Lionel Messi, including a 25-yard (23 m) free kick in the 82nd minute, his 600th goal for the club. Despite the three-goal advantage, Messi spoke on the task awaiting his teammates in the second leg at Anfield: "We know the game isn't over, we know we're going to a very difficult stadium with a lot of history". With a big deficit going into the second leg and preoccupation with the Premier League title race, Liverpool manager Jürgen Klopp asked his players to "just try" or "fail in the most beautiful way". Despite Mohamed Salah and Roberto Firmino being absent with injuries, Liverpool overturned the deficit with a 4–0 win at Anfield, advancing to the final 4–3 on aggregate, in what was described as one of the greatest comebacks in Champions League history. Liverpool's reserve striker Divock Origi scored the opening goal in the seventh minute, followed by two goals in quick succession by half-time substitute Georginio Wijnaldum to level the tie on aggregate in the 56th minute. Alisson made a series of key saves to deny Barcelona a valuable away goal, a repeat of his performance for Roma in the previous year's quarter-final as they overcame a three-goal deficit against Barcelona. Origi scored the match's final goal in the 79th minute, taking advantage of a corner taken quickly from Trent Alexander-Arnold that left him unmarked in the penalty area.

== Pre-match ==
=== Identity ===
Brand identity of the final

The final identity to be used in the final was unveiled on 30 August 2018 during the group stage draw. It was designed by Madrid-based artist Ruben Sanchez (Zoonchez) who drew inspiration from local folklore, including representations of the city emblem, cats (a nickname for Madrilenians), a guitar and a statue in Puerta del Sol. The colour palette includes blues and oranges that represent a type of Madrid sunset that is known as a "candilazo".

=== Ambassador ===
The ambassador for the final was former Spain international Luis García, who played for Atlético Madrid in 2002–03 and from 2007 to 2009, and won the UEFA Champions League with Liverpool in 2005.

=== Ticketing ===
With a stadium capacity of 63,500 for the final, a total of 38,000 tickets were available to fans and the general public; the two finalist teams received 17,000 tickets each and another 4,000 tickets were made available for purchase by fans worldwide via UEFA.com from 14 to 21 March 2019 in four price categories: €600, €450, €160 and €70. The remaining tickets were allocated to the local organising committee, UEFA and national associations, commercial partners and broadcasters, and to serve the corporate hospitality programme.

Prices for accommodation in Madrid and flights to the city from English airports surged by up to 683 percent in the hours after the semi-finals. The handling of the travel logistics and ticket pricing by UEFA were criticised by managers Jürgen Klopp and Mauricio Pochettino, as well as supporters groups representing the two clubs. Tottenham announced plans to show a live screening of the Champions League final at their stadium in London that would be opened to a full-capacity audience.

=== Officials ===
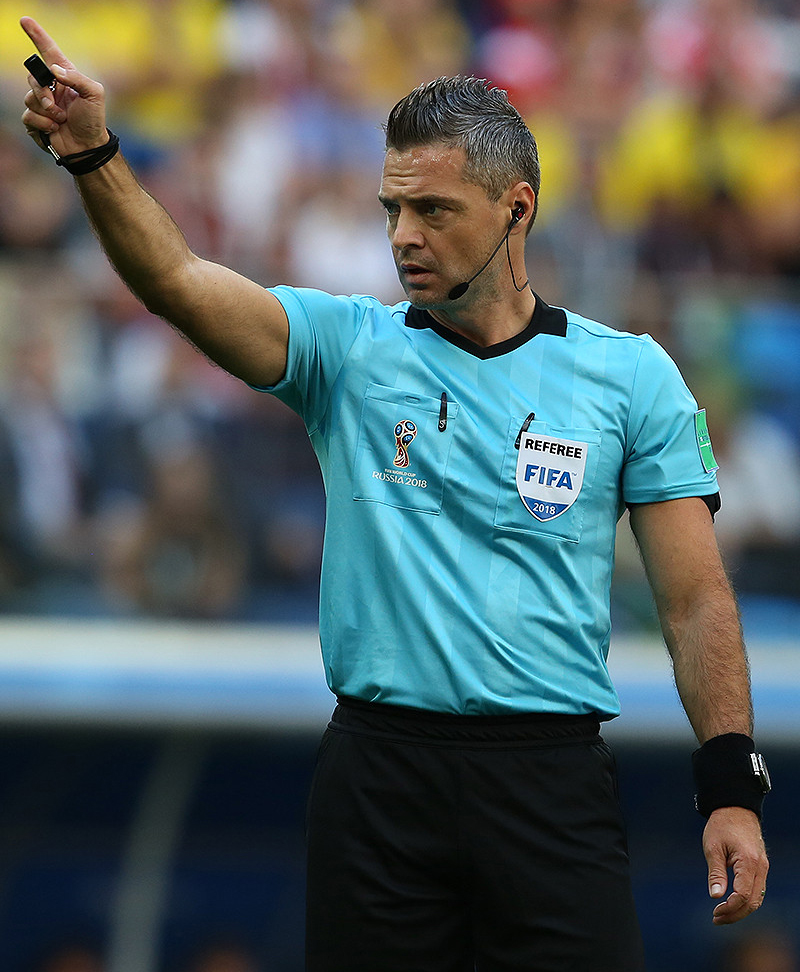
Damir Skomina, the referee for the final

On 14 May 2019, UEFA named Slovenian Damir Skomina as the referee for the final. Skomina became a FIFA referee in 2002, and was previously the fourth official in the 2013 UEFA Champions League final. His appointment completed a treble of European finals, having officiated the 2017 UEFA Europa League Final between Ajax and Manchester United, as well as the 2012 UEFA Super Cup between Chelsea and Atlético Madrid. He was joined by two of his fellow countrymen, with Jure Praprotnik and Robert Vukan as assistant referees. Spaniard Antonio Mateu Lahoz was the fourth official and Danny Makkelie of the Netherlands was the video assistant referee in the debut of the system at a Champions League final. He was joined by his compatriot Pol van Boekel as one of the assistant VAR officials, with Felix Zwayer of Germany appointed as the other assistant VAR for the final. His fellow German Mark Borsch served as the offside VAR official.

=== Opening ceremony ===
American pop rock band Imagine Dragons performed at the opening ceremony before kick-off, playing a medley of their hits "Believer", "Thunder", "Radioactive" and "On Top of the World", supported by a display of pyrotechnics and fireworks. Ukrainian electric string quartet Asturia Girls performed the UEFA Champions League Anthem as the teams walked out for the match.

== Match ==
=== Summary ===
Prior to kick-off, a moment of silence was observed for Spanish footballer José Antonio Reyes, who had died in a car crash earlier in the day. Liverpool kicked off and earned a penalty kick just 24 seconds into the match when Moussa Sissoko handled the ball in the penalty area, after a pass by Sadio Mané from the left struck his outstretched arm. The resulting penalty in the second minute was scored by Mohamed Salah shooting to the right, giving Liverpool a 1–0 lead and Salah the second-fastest goal in a Champions League final. Tottenham held the majority of possession in the first half, but were unable to find scoring chances; Liverpool had their own chances from a series of six corner kicks, but played cautiously with their lead. The match was briefly interrupted in the 18th minute by a pitch invader.

The second half featured more chances for Liverpool, including a shot by James Milner that beat goalkeeper Hugo Lloris but went wide of the goal. Both managers made their first set of substitutions around the 60th minute, with Klopp bringing on Divock Origi for Roberto Firmino and Pochettino replacing Harry Winks with Lucas Moura. Tottenham began pressing their attackers forward and took several shots on target in the last half-hour of the regular time, leaving themselves open to counterattacks by Liverpool. Following a corner kick in the 87th minute that was not cleared away by Spurs, Divock Origi struck from inside the penalty area and scored into the bottom right corner of the net. Liverpool won their sixth European Cup and Jürgen Klopp won his first trophy for the club.

=== Details ===
The "home" team (for administrative purposes) was determined by an additional draw held after the quarter-final and semi-final draws, which was held on 15 March 2019, 12:00 CET, at the UEFA headquarters in Nyon, Switzerland.

1 June 2019
21:00 UTC+2

Tottenham Hotspur (England)	0–2	(England) Liverpool
	Report	Salah 2' (pen.); Origi 87'

Estadio Metropolitano, Madrid
Attendance: 63,272
Referee: Damir Skomina (Slovenia)

Tottenham Hotspur	Liverpool

GK	1	(France) Hugo Lloris (c)
RB	2	(England) Kieran Trippier
CB	4	(Belgium) Toby Alderweireld
CB	5	(Belgium) Jan Vertonghen
LB	3	(England) Danny Rose
CM	17	(France) Moussa Sissoko	(substituted off) 74'
CM	8	(England) Harry Winks	(substituted off) 66'
RW	20	(England) Dele Alli	(substituted off) 81'
AM	23	(Denmark) Christian Eriksen
LW	7	(South Korea) Son Heung-min
CF	10	(England) Harry Kane
Substitutes:
GK	13	(Netherlands) Michel Vorm
GK	22	(Argentina) Paulo Gazzaniga
DF	6	(Colombia) Davinson Sánchez
DF	16	(England) Kyle Walker-Peters
DF	21	(Argentina) Juan Foyth
DF	24	(Ivory Coast) Serge Aurier
DF	33	(Wales) Ben Davies
MF	11	(Argentina) Erik Lamela
MF	12	(Kenya) Victor Wanyama
MF	15	(England) Eric Dier	(substituted on) 74'
MF	27	(Brazil) Lucas Moura	(substituted on) 66'
FW	18	(Spain) Fernando Llorente	(substituted on) 81'
Manager:
(Argentina) Mauricio Pochettino

GK	13	(Brazil) Alisson
RB	66	(England) Trent Alexander-Arnold
CB	32	(Cameroon) Joël Matip
CB	4	(Netherlands) Virgil van Dijk
LB	26	(Scotland) Andy Robertson
CM	14	(England) Jordan Henderson (c)
CM	3	(Brazil) Fabinho
CM	5	(Netherlands) Georginio Wijnaldum	(substituted off) 62'
RW	11	(Egypt) Mohamed Salah
CF	9	(Brazil) Roberto Firmino	(substituted off) 58'
LW	10	(Senegal) Sadio Mané	(substituted off) 90'
Substitutes:
GK	22	(Belgium) Simon Mignolet
GK	62	(Republic of Ireland) Caoimhín Kelleher
DF	6	(Croatia) Dejan Lovren
DF	12	(England) Joe Gomez	(substituted on) 90'
DF	18	(Spain) Alberto Moreno
MF	7	(England) James Milner	(substituted on) 62'
MF	20	(England) Adam Lallana
MF	21	(England) Alex Oxlade-Chamberlain
MF	23	(Switzerland) Xherdan Shaqiri
FW	15	(England) Daniel Sturridge
FW	24	(England) Rhian Brewster
FW	27	(Belgium) Divock Origi	(substituted on) 58'
Manager:
(Germany) Jürgen Klopp

Man of the Match:
Virgil van Dijk (Liverpool)

Assistant referees:
Jure Praprotnik (Slovenia)
Robert Vukan (Slovenia)
Fourth official:
Antonio Mateu Lahoz (Spain)
Video assistant referee:
Danny Makkelie (Netherlands)
Assistant video assistant referees:
Pol van Boekel (Netherlands)
Felix Zwayer (Germany)
Offside video assistant referee:
Mark Borsch (Germany)

Match rules

- 90 minutes
- 30 minutes of extra time if necessary
- Penalty shoot-out if scores still level
- Twelve named substitutes
- Maximum of three substitutions, with a fourth allowed in extra time

=== Statistics ===
First half
Statistic	Tottenham Hotspur	Liverpool
Goals scored	0	1
Total shots	2	8
Shots on target	0	2
Saves	1	0
Ball possession	61%	39%
Corner kicks	2	6
Fouls committed	2	4
Offsides	1	1
Yellow cards	0	0
Red cards	0	0

Second half
Statistic	Tottenham Hotspur	Liverpool
Goals scored	0	1
Total shots	14	6
Shots on target	8	1
Saves	0	8
Ball possession	61%	39%
Corner kicks	6	3
Fouls committed	3	2
Offsides	2	1
Yellow cards	0	0
Red cards	0	0

Overall
Statistic	Tottenham Hotspur	Liverpool
Goals scored	0	2
Total shots	16	14
Shots on target	8	3
Saves	1	8
Ball possession	61%	39%
Corner kicks	8	9
Fouls committed	5	6
Offsides	3	2
Yellow cards	0	0
Red cards	0	0

== Post-match ==
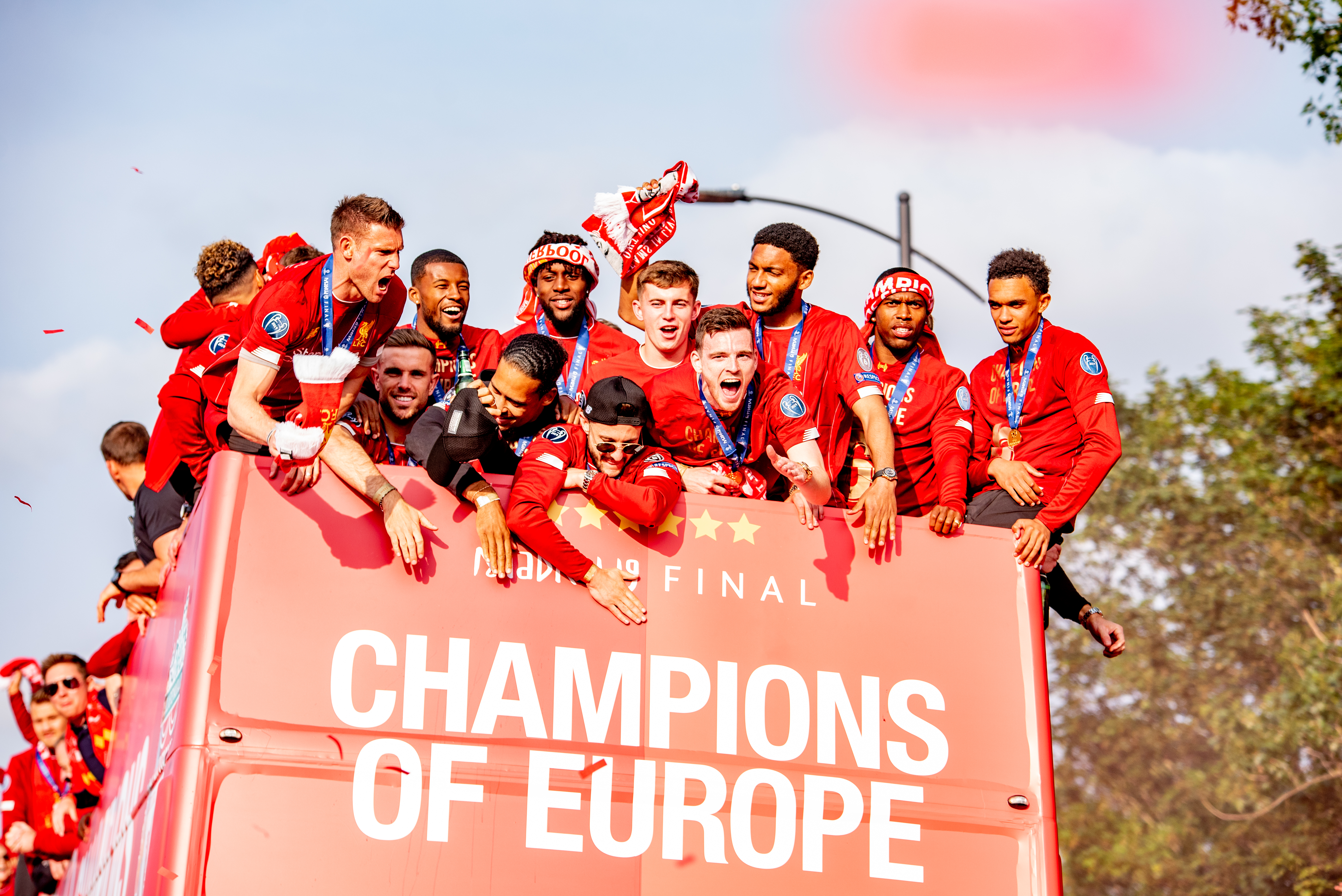
Liverpool players on an open-top bus, parading the Champions League trophy through the streets of Liverpool the day after the final

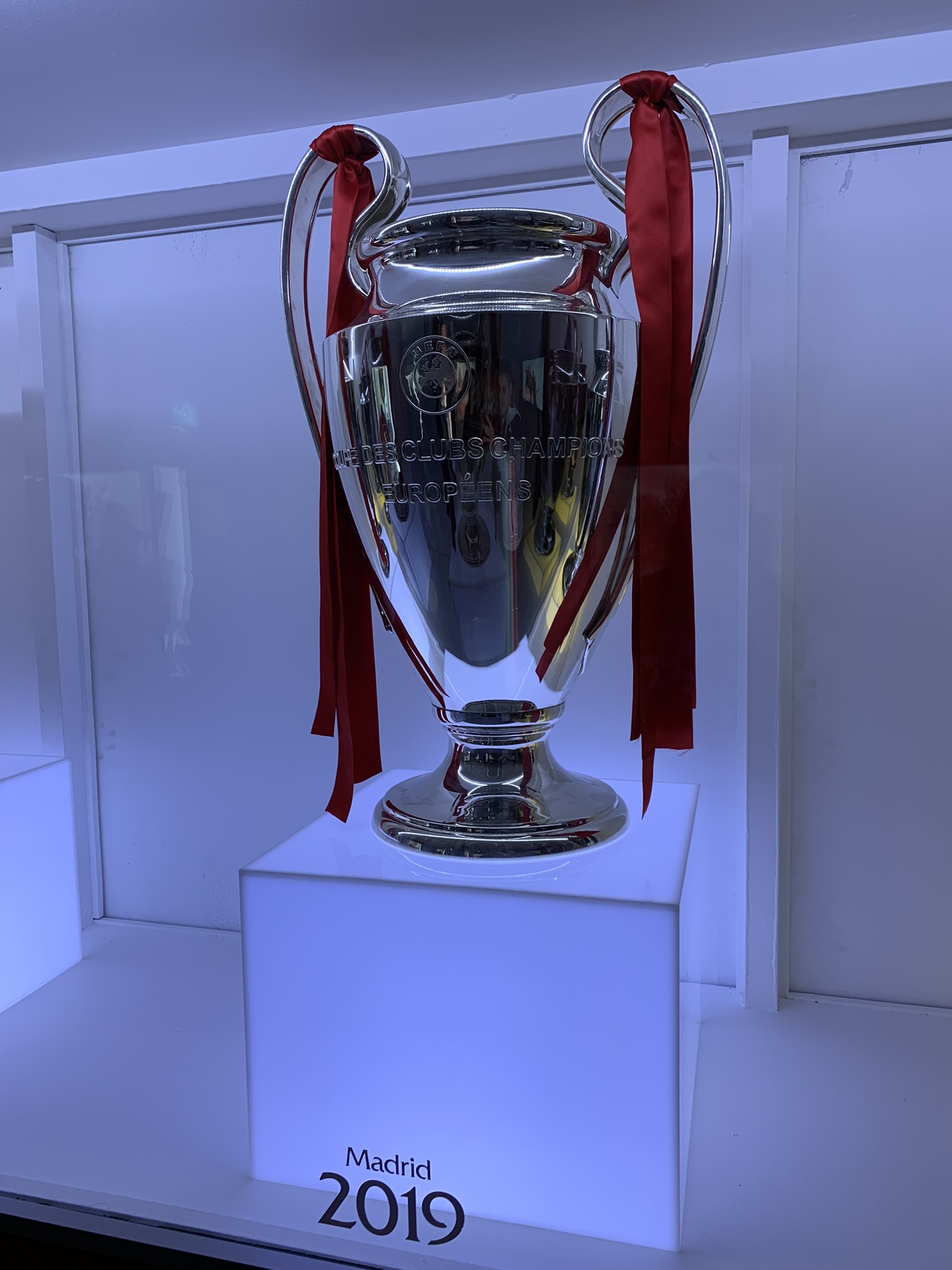
The 2019 Champions League trophy in the club museum

Liverpool won their sixth European Cup and their second of the Champions League era. The club surpassed Barcelona and Bayern Munich, each with five titles, and ranks third behind Real Madrid (13) and Milan (7) for overall European titles. Liverpool defender Virgil van Dijk was named the man of the match by UEFA for his leadership and interventions to break up Tottenham's attacks.

Liverpool returned to England the day after the final and celebrated their victory by parading the trophy around Liverpool in an open-top double-decker bus. The parade began at Allerton Maze and continued for 8 miles (13 kilometres) towards the city centre, ending on the Liverpool Strand. Police estimated the number of supporters to be approximately 750,000, with the number of people lining the route causing the parade to last an additional two hours.

=== Subsequent matches ===
As champions, Liverpool faced Chelsea (winners of the 2019 UEFA Europa League Final) in the 2019 UEFA Super Cup, held on 14 August. Liverpool won the match 5–4 on penalties after the game had ended 2–2 after extra time. Representing Europe, Liverpool also took part in the 2019 FIFA Club World Cup. Liverpool went on to win their first Club World Cup title, defeating Mexican club Monterrey 2–1 in the semi-finals and Brazilian club Flamengo 1–0 after extra time in the final.

== See also ==
- 2019 UEFA Europa League final
- 2019 UEFA Women's Champions League final
- 2018–19 Liverpool F.C. season
- 2018–19 Tottenham Hotspur F.C. season
- English football clubs in international competitions
- List of football matches between British clubs in UEFA competitions
- Liverpool F.C. in international football
- Tottenham Hotspur F.C. in European football
