= 1963 European Cup Winners' Cup final =

- Match programme cover
- Event: 1962–63 European Cup Winners' Cup
Atlético Madrid	Tottenham Hotspur
(Spain)	(England)
1	5
- Date: 15 May 1963
- Venue: Feijenoord Stadion, Rotterdam
- Referee: Andries van Leeuwen (Netherlands)
- Attendance: 49,143

The 1963 European Cup Winners' Cup final was the final football match of the 1962–63 European Cup Winners' Cup and was the third European Cup Winners' Cup final. It was contested between the defending champions, Atlético Madrid of Spain and Tottenham Hotspur of England, and was held at Feijenoord Stadion in Rotterdam, Netherlands. Tottenham won the match 5–1 thanks to goals by Jimmy Greaves (2), John White and Terry Dyson (2). Tottenham's victory made them the first English team to win a UEFA trophy.

Tottenham's next major trophy came four years later when they won the FA Cup in 1967, but Greaves was the only player from this team to feature in the next Tottenham side to win a major trophy due to the bulk of the team having retired or been transferred over the next four years. John White, however, was killed by lightning on a golf course the following year.

== Route to the final ==
(Spain) Atlético Madrid					(England) Tottenham Hotspur			
Opponent	Agg.	1st leg	2nd leg		Opponent	Agg.	1st leg	2nd leg
(Malta) Hibernians	5–0	4–0 (H)	1–0 (A)	First round	(Scotland) Rangers	8–4	5–2 (H)	3–2 (A)
(Bulgaria) Botev Plovdiv	5–1	1–1 (A)	4–0 (H)	Quarter-finals	(Czechoslovakia) Slovan Bratislava	6–2	0–2 (A)	6–0 (H)
(West Germany) Nürnberg	3–2	1–2 (A)	2–0 (H)	Semi-finals	(Socialist Federal Republic of Yugoslavia) OFK Beograd	5–2	2–1 (A)	3–1 (H)

== Match ==
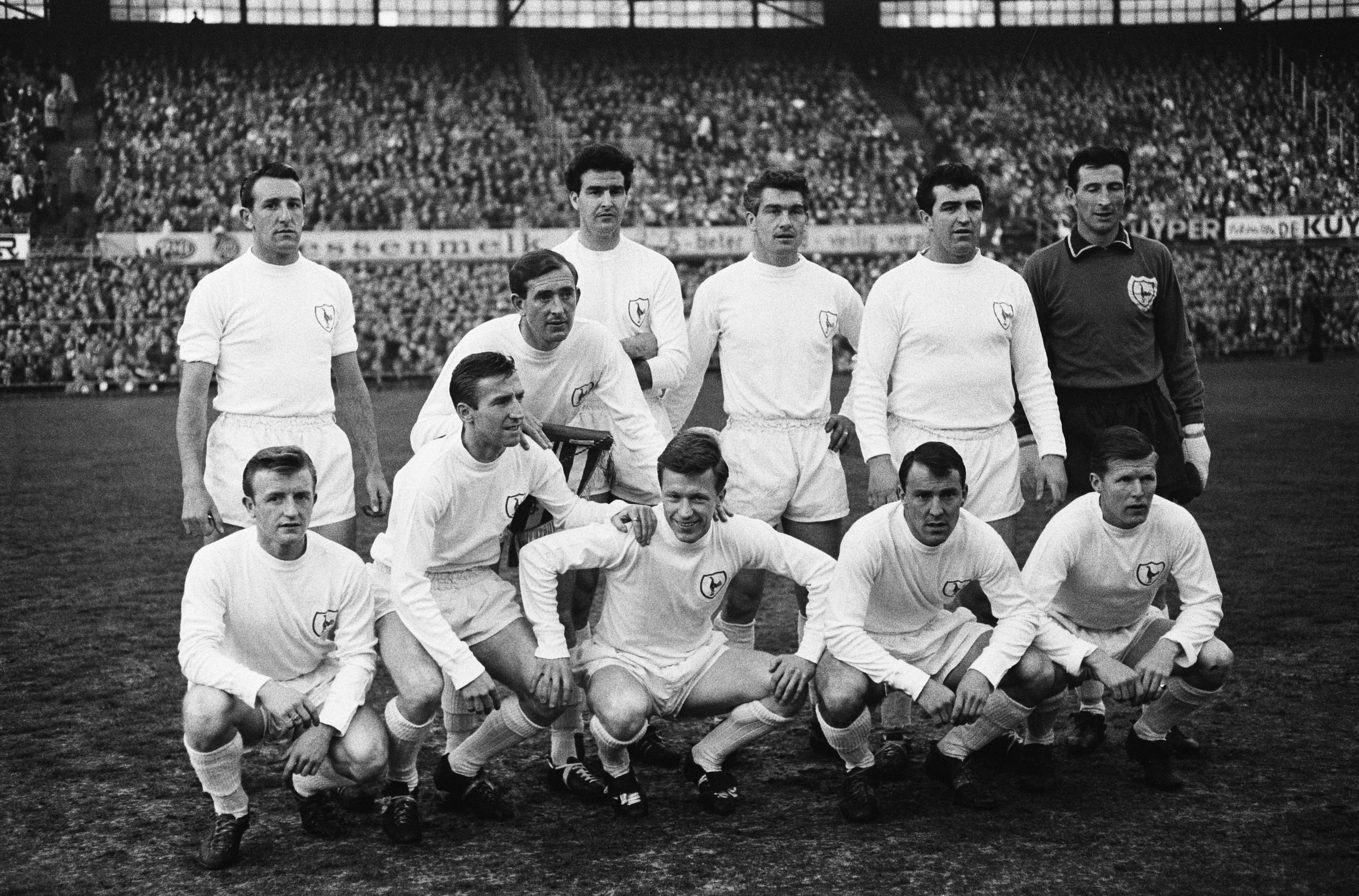
Tottenham's starting line-up

=== Details ===
15 May 1963
20:15

Atlético Madrid (Spain)	1–5	(England) Tottenham Hotspur
Collar 47' (pen.)	Report	Greaves 16', 80'; White 35'; Dyson 67', 85'

Feijenoord Stadion, Rotterdam
Attendance: 49,143
Referee: Andries van Leeuwen (Netherlands)

Atlético Madrid	Tottenham Hotspur

GK	1	(Argentina) Edgardo Madinabeytia
DF	2	(Spain) Feliciano Rivilla
DF	3	(Spain) José Antonio Rodríguez López
DF	4	(Brazil) Ramiro
DF	5	(Argentina) Jorge Griffa
MF	6	(Spain) Jesús Glaría
MF	7	(Spain) Miguel Jones
FW	8	(Spain) Adelardo Rodríguez
FW	9	(Spain) Chuzo
FW	10	(Portugal) Mendonça
FW	11	(Spain) Enrique Collar (c)
Manager:
(Spain) Sabino Barinaga

GK	1	(Scotland) Bill Brown
RB	2	(England) Peter Baker
CB	5	(England) Maurice Norman
LB	3	(England) Ron Henry
CM	4	(Northern Ireland) Danny Blanchflower (c)
CM	6	(England) Tony Marchi
AM	8	(Scotland) John White
RW	7	(Wales) Cliff Jones
CF	10	(England) Jimmy Greaves
CF	9	(England) Bobby Smith
LW	11	(England) Terry Dyson
Manager:
(England) Bill Nicholson

== See also ==
- Atlético Madrid in European football
- Tottenham Hotspur F.C. in European football
