= José Antonio Rodríguez (footballer, born 1938) =

Spanish footballer

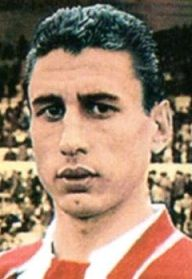
- A portrait of José Antonio Rodríguez López

Personal information
- Full name: José Antonio Rodríguez López
- Date of birth: 12 February 1938 (age 88)
- Place of birth: Megeces (Valladolid), Spain
- Position: Defender

Senior career*
Years	Team	Apps	(Gls)
1960–1964	Atlético Madrid		
1964–1965	Elche CF		
1965–1967	Hércules CF		
- * Club domestic league appearances and goals

José Antonio Rodríguez López (born 12 February 1938 in Megeces, Spain) is a Spanish former footballer.

He played for Atlético de Madrid between 1960 and 1964, winning the Spanish Cup in 1960, 1961, and 1963, and the European Cup Winners Cup in 1962.
