= Tony Marchi =

English footballer (1933–2022)

Personal information
- Full name: Anthony Marchi
- Date of birth: 21 January 1933
- Place of birth: Edmonton, England
- Date of death: 15 March 2022 (aged 89)
- Place of death: Chelmsford, England
- Position: Wing-half

Youth career
- 1947–1949: Tottenham Hotspur

Senior career*
Years	Team	Apps	(Gls)
1949–1957	Tottenham Hotspur	131	(2)
1957–1959	Juventus	0	(0)
1957–1958	→ Vicenza (loan)	30	(7)
1958–1959	→ Torino (loan)	29	(4)
1959–1965	Tottenham Hotspur	101	(5)
Total		291	(18)

Managerial career
- 1965–1967: Cambridge City
- 1967–1968: Northampton Town
- * Club domestic league appearances and goals

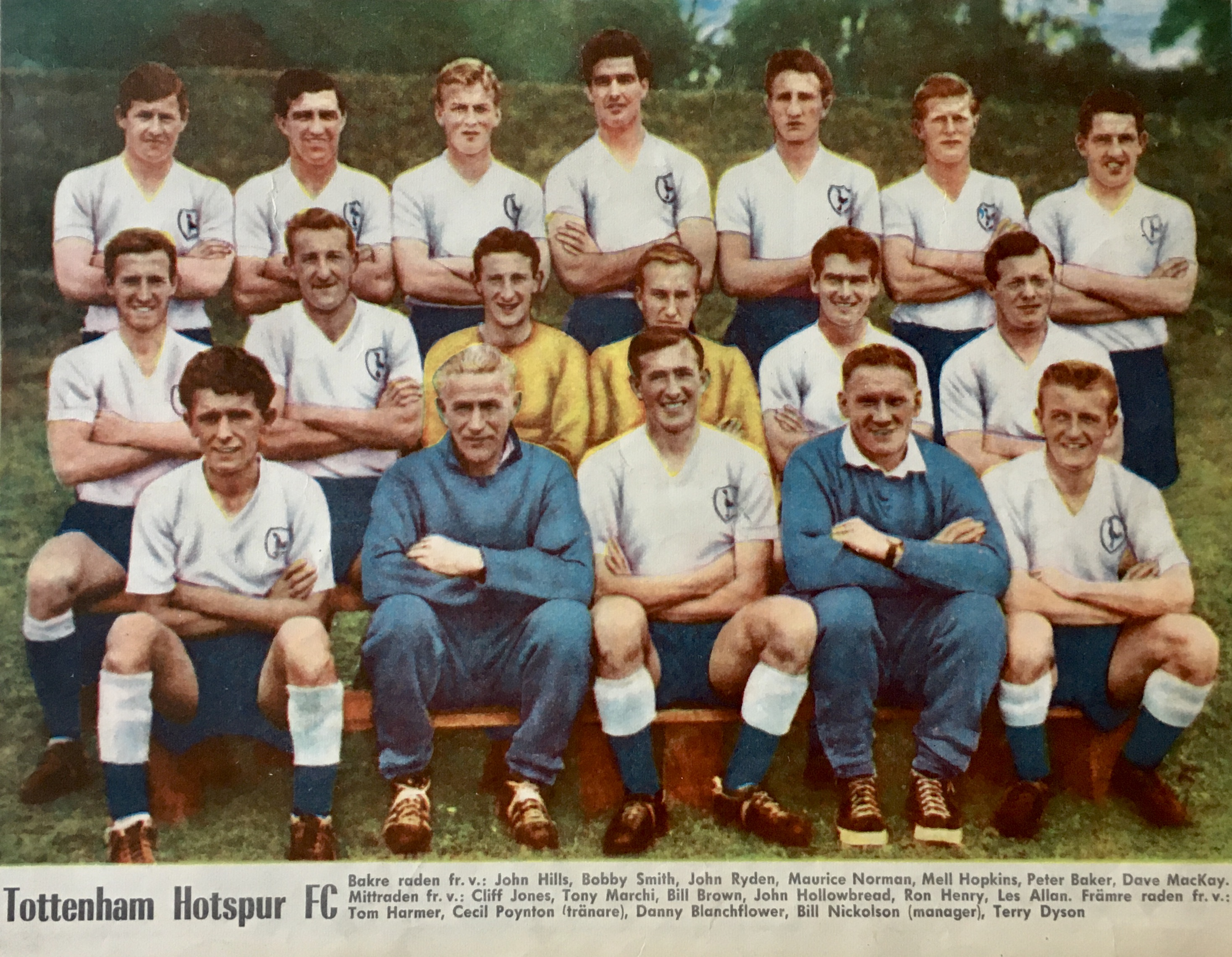
Tottenham Hotspur in 1960 with Danny Blanchflower (captain) and both goalkeepers, Bill Brown and John Hollowbread, in the team with Cecil Poynton as trainer and Bill Nicholson as manager. Tony Marchi sitting in the middle row as number two from left.

Anthony Marchi (21 January 1933 – 15 March 2022) was an English football player and manager.

== Career ==
Marchi played for Tottenham Hotspur in the position of wing half from 1950 until 1965, which was broken up by a two-year spell in Italy with Vicenza and Torino, both on loan from Juventus. During much of his career at Spurs, Marchi was mostly used as an understudy to Danny Blanchflower and Dave Mackay. However, in 1962–63, following injuries, he established himself in the side and was a member of the 1963 UEFA Cup Winners' Cup Final winning team. He was one of seventeen players used by Spurs in their Double winning side of 1960–61. He also later managed Cambridge City and Northampton Town.

Marchi died at the age of 89 on 15 March 2022 in Broomfield Hospital, Chelmsford.

== Honours ==
Tottenham Hotspur

- Football League First Division: 1950–51
- FA Cup: 1960–61, 1961–62
- Football League Second Division: 1949–50
- European Cup Winners' Cup: 1962–63
