= Megeces =

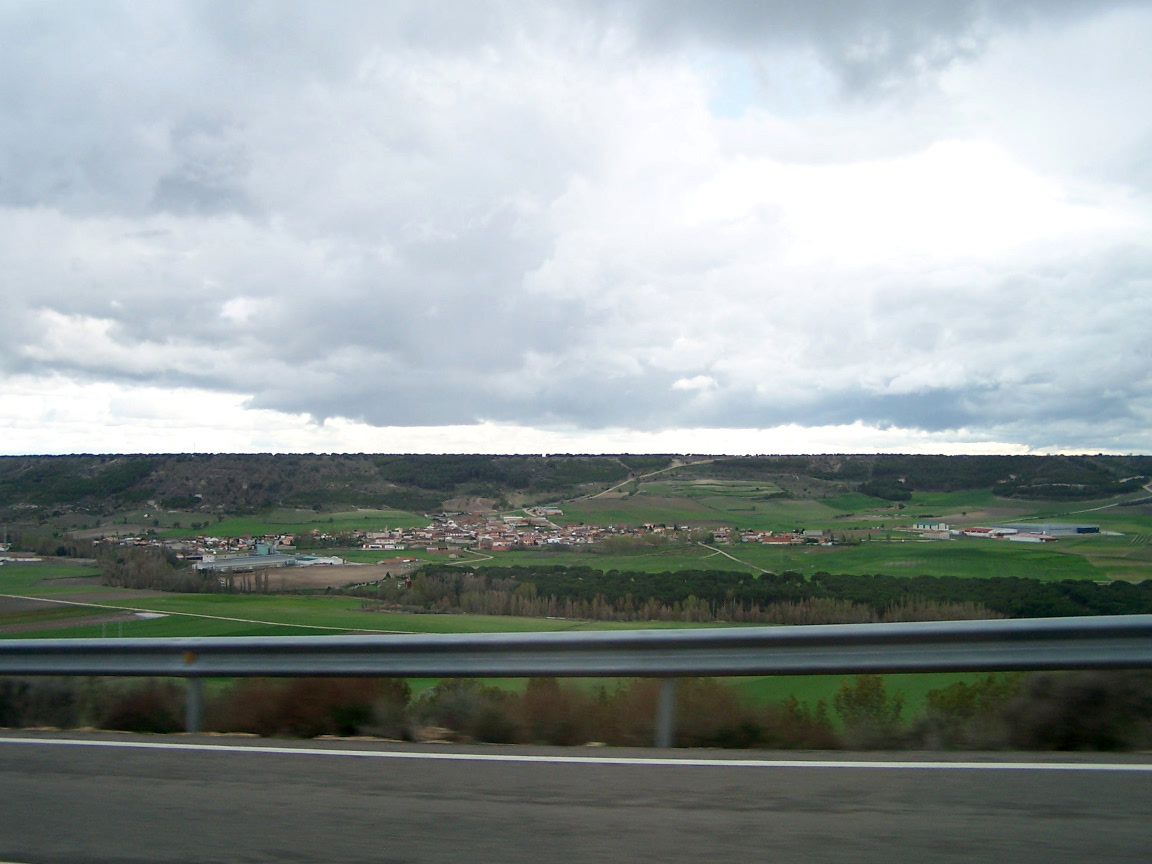

- Flag Coat of arms

- Location within Spain
- Coordinates: 41°24′26″N 4°34′00″W
- Country: Spain
- Autonomous community: Castile and León
- Province: Valladolid
- Municipality: Megeces

Area
  - Total: 19 km^{2} (7.3 sq mi)
- Elevation: 741 m (2,431 ft)

Population (2025-01-01)
  - Total: 419
  - Density: 22/km^{2} (57/sq mi)
- Time zone: UTC+1 (CET)
  - Summer (DST): UTC+2 (CEST)

Megeces is a municipality located in the province of Valladolid, Castile and León, Spain. According to the 2011 census (INE), the municipality has a population of 455 inhabitants. It is located at 741 metres (2,431 ft) above sea level.
