= De Kuip =

Football stadium in Rotterdam

Stadion Feijenoord
- De Kuip

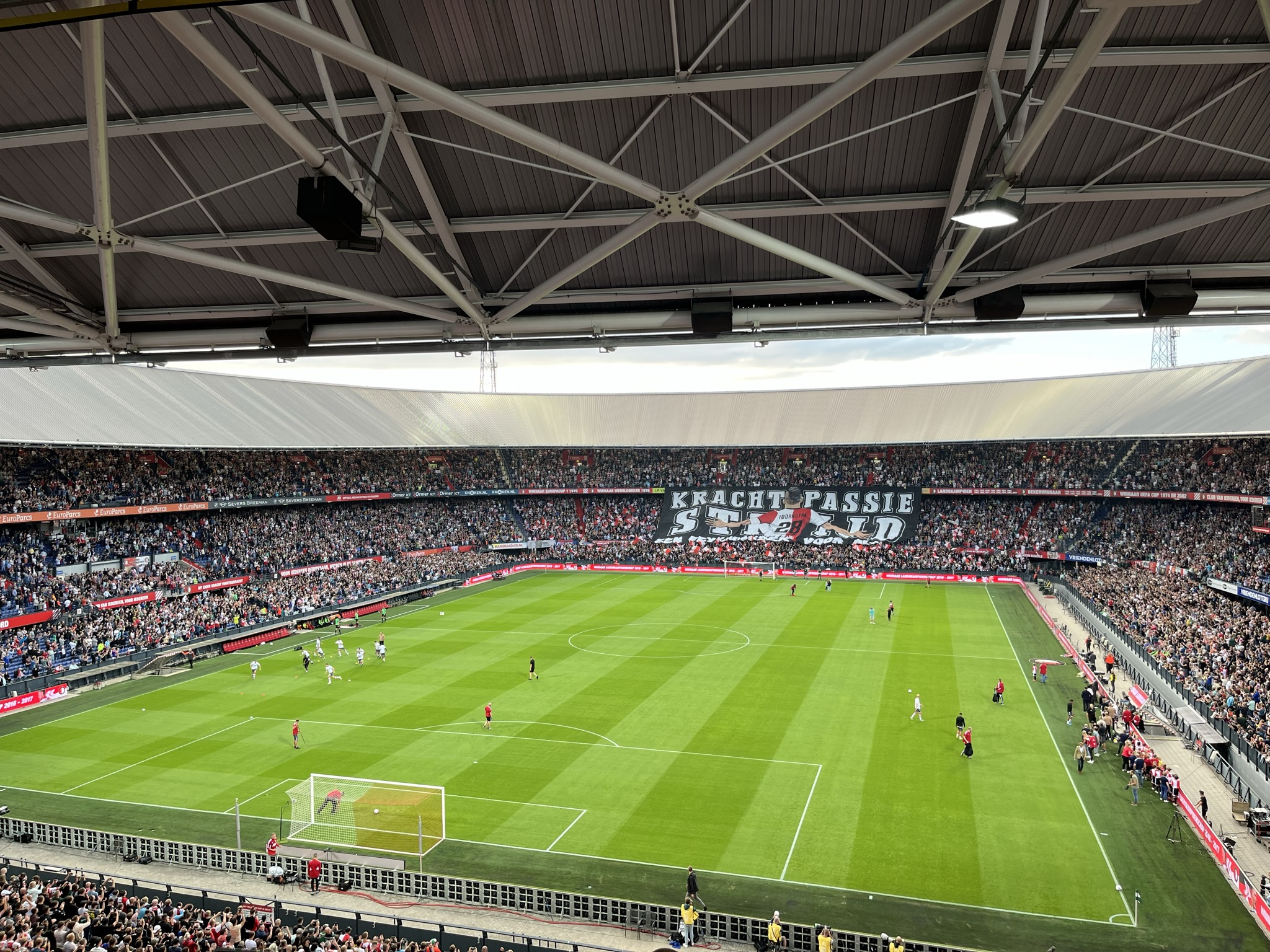
- UEFA
- Interactive map of Stadion Feijenoord
- Full name: Stadion Feijenoord
- Location: Rotterdam, Netherlands
- Coordinates: 51°53′38″N 4°31′23″E
- Capacity: 47,500 (limited capacity); 51,117; 50,000 (concerts)
- Field size: 105 m × 68 m

Construction
- Built: 1935–1937
- Opened: 27 March 1937; 89 years ago
- Renovated: 1994
- Architects: Leendert van der Vlugt; Broekbakema (renovation)

Tenants
- Feyenoord (1937–present); Netherlands national football team (selected matches)

Website
- Official website

Stadion Feijenoord (pronounced [ˌstaːdijɔɱ ˈfɛiənoːrt]), more commonly known by its nickname De Kuip (pronounced [də ˈkœyp], the Tub), is a stadium in Rotterdam, Netherlands. It was completed in 1937. The name is derived from the Feijenoord district in Rotterdam, and from the club with the same name (although the club's name was internationalised to Feyenoord in 1973). The stadium has also hosted the Dutch national football team. Beginning in the late 1970s, it also became a concert venue, including for international touring musical acts, though the local government stopped allowing concerts after mid-2025.

The stadium's original capacity was 64,000. In 1949, it was expanded to 69,000, and in 1994 it was converted to a 51,117-seat all-seater. In 1999, a significant amount of restoration and interior work took place at the stadium before its use as a venue in the UEFA Euro 2000 tournament, although capacity was largely unaffected.

== History ==
Leen van Zandvliet, Feyenoord's president in the 1930s, came up with the idea of building an entirely new stadium, unlike any other on the continent, with two free hanging tiers and no obstacles blocking the view. Contemporary examples were Highbury, where the West and East stands had been recently built as a double deck, and Yankee Stadium in New York. Johannes Brinkman and Leendert van der Vlugt, the famous designers of the Van Nelle factory in Rotterdam were asked to design a stadium out of glass, concrete and steel, cheap materials at that time. The stadium was co-financed by the billionaire Daniël George van Beuningen, who made his fortune in World War I, exporting coal from Germany to Britain through neutral Netherlands.

In World War II, the stadium was nearly torn down for scrap by German occupiers. After the war, the stadium's capacity was expanded in 1949; stadium lights were added in 1958. On 29 October 1991, De Kuip was named as being one of Rotterdam's monuments. In 1994 the stadium was extensively renovated to its present form: It became all-seater, and the roof was extended to cover all the seats. An extra building was constructed for commercial use by Feyenoord, it also houses a restaurant and a museum, The Home of History.

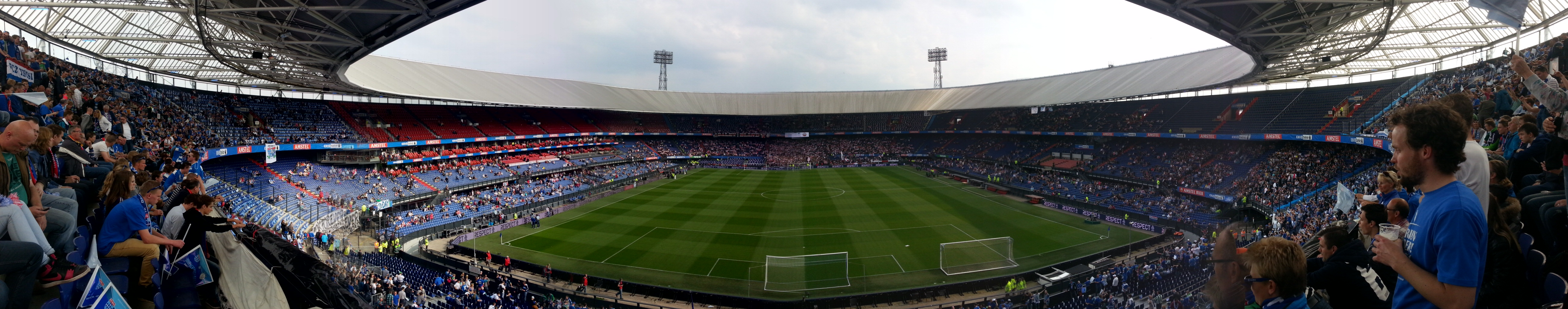
De Kuip before the KNVB Cup final in April 2014

=== Failed new stadium plans ===
From 2006, Feyenoord began working on plans for a new stadium, initially planned for completion in 2017 and with an estimated capacity of 85,000 seats. In 2014, Feyenoord decided to renovate the existing stadium, expanding its capacity to 70,000, as well as adding a retractable roof. Construction was planned to start in summer 2015 and finish in 2018, with an estimated €200 million cost. Plans included a new training facility costing an extra €16 million.

In March 2016, Feyenoord announced that they instead preferred building a new stadium. In May 2017, the city of Rotterdam agreed with a plan to build a new stadium with a capacity of 63,000 seats. In December 2019, Feyenoord announced that if construction of the new stadium was given the final go-ahead in 2020 the stadium would open in the summer of 2025. On 21 April 2022, managing director Dennis te Kloese announced that the club would not proceed with renovating the existing stadium or building a new one.

== Facilities and related buildings ==
Next to De Kuip and Feyenoord's training ground there is another, smaller sports arena, the Topsportcentrum Rotterdam. This arena hosts events in many sports and in various levels of competition, including in judo, volleyball, and handball.

== Commercial uses ==
=== Football history ===
De Kuip is currently the home stadium of football club Feyenoord, traditionally one of the top teams in the Netherlands. It has also long been one of the home grounds of the Netherlands national football team, having hosted over 150 international matches, the first international match at the stadium was a match against Belgium on 2 May 1937. In 1963, De Kuip staged the final of the European Cup Winners' Cup, with Tottenham Hotspur becoming the first British club to win a European trophy, defeating Atlético Madrid 5–1. The stadium has hosted a record ten European finals, the last being the 2002 UEFA Cup Final in which Feyenoord, coincidentally playing a home match, defeated Borussia Dortmund 3–2. In 2000, the Feijenoord stadium hosted the final of Euro 2000, played in the Netherlands and Belgium, where France defeated Italy 2–1 in extra time. The stadium also hosted the 2023 UEFA Nations League Final.

Date	Winners	Result	Runners-up	Round	Attendance
15 May 1963	(England) Tottenham Hotspur	5–1	(Spain) Atlético Madrid	1963 European Cup Winners' Cup Final	49,000
23 May 1968	(Italy) Milan	2–0	(Germany) Hamburger SV	1968 European Cup Winners' Cup Final	53,000
31 May 1972	(Netherlands) Ajax	2–0	(Italy) Inter Milan	1972 European Cup Final	61,354
8 May 1974	(East Germany) Magdeburg	2–0	(Italy) Milan	1974 European Cup Winners' Cup Final	6,461
26 May 1982	(England) Aston Villa	1–0	(Germany) Bayern Munich	1982 European Cup Final	46,000
15 May 1985	(England) Everton	3–1	(Austria) Rapid Wien	1985 European Cup Winners' Cup Final	38,500
15 May 1991	(England) Manchester United	2–1	(Spain) Barcelona	1991 European Cup Winners' Cup Final	43,500
14 May 1997	(Spain) Barcelona	1–0	(France) Paris Saint-Germain	1997 UEFA Cup Winners' Cup Final	36,802
2 July 2000	France	2–1 (g.g.)	Italy	UEFA Euro 2000 Final	50,000
8 May 2002	(Netherlands) Feyenoord	3–2	(Germany) Borussia Dortmund	2002 UEFA Cup Final	45,611
18 June 2023	Spain	0–0 (5–4 pen)	Croatia	2023 UEFA Nations League Final	41,110

=== Concerts ===
The stadium has hosted concerts since 1978. The first show was headlined by Bob Dylan, with special guest Eric Clapton, on 23 June 1978. The Rolling Stones followed with three shows in 1982. Other international acts performing in De Kuip were Michael Jackson, Madonna, Pink Floyd, Prince, Genesis, Bruce Springsteen, Simon and Garfunkel, and U2. David Bowie held his dress rehearsals and subsequently opened his 1987 Glass Spider Tour at the stadium. In 1995, René Froger became the first Dutch artist to headline at De Kuip, and he sold out two shows. In 2008, Kane became the first Dutch band to headline the stadium. In 2019, Marco Borsato held five concerts at De Kuip to increase his total to 14, breaking The Rolling Stones' past venue record of 10.

In April 2024, the municipality of Rotterdam announced that with the construction of new houses nearby concerts would no longer take place at De Kuip beginning in 2026, to eliminate noise pollution in the area. De Kuip will receive 12 million euros from Rotterdam as compensation. Three concerts from the Dutch band Di-rect from 12 to 14 June 2025 are scheduled to be the final shows in the stadium.

== Euro 2000 ==
Date	Team 1	Result	Team 2	Round
13 June 2000	Spain	0–1	Norway	Group C
16 June 2000	Denmark	0–3	Netherlands	Group D
20 June 2000	Portugal	3–0	Germany	Group A
25 June 2000	Netherlands	6–1	FR Yugoslavia	Quarter-finals
2 July 2000	France	2–1 (asdet)	Italy	Final

== 2023 UEFA Nations League Finals ==
One of the venues of the 2023 UEFA Nations League Finals.

Date	Team #1	Result	Team #2	Round	Attendance
14 June 2023	Netherlands	2–4 (a.e.t.)	Croatia	Semi-finals	39,359
18 June 2023	Croatia	0–0 (a.e.t.) (4–5 p)	Spain	Final	41,110

== Average attendance numbers per season, 1937–2007 ==
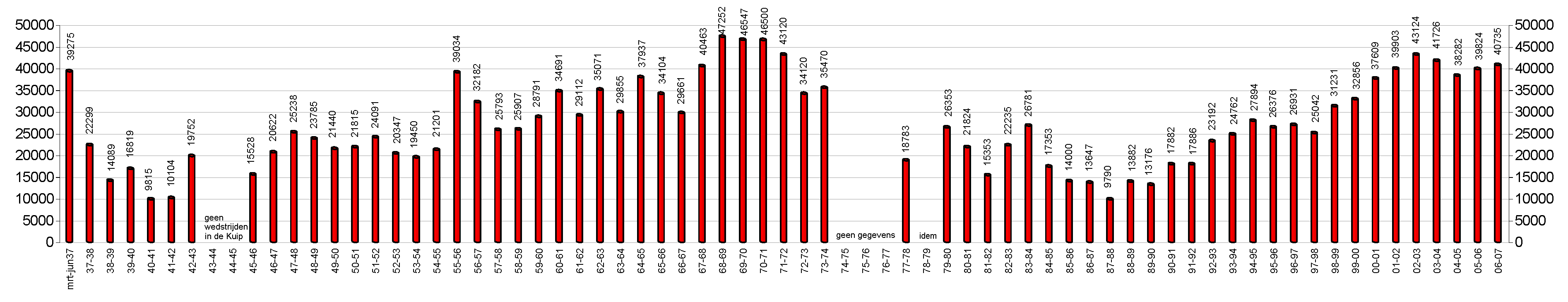

== Gallery ==
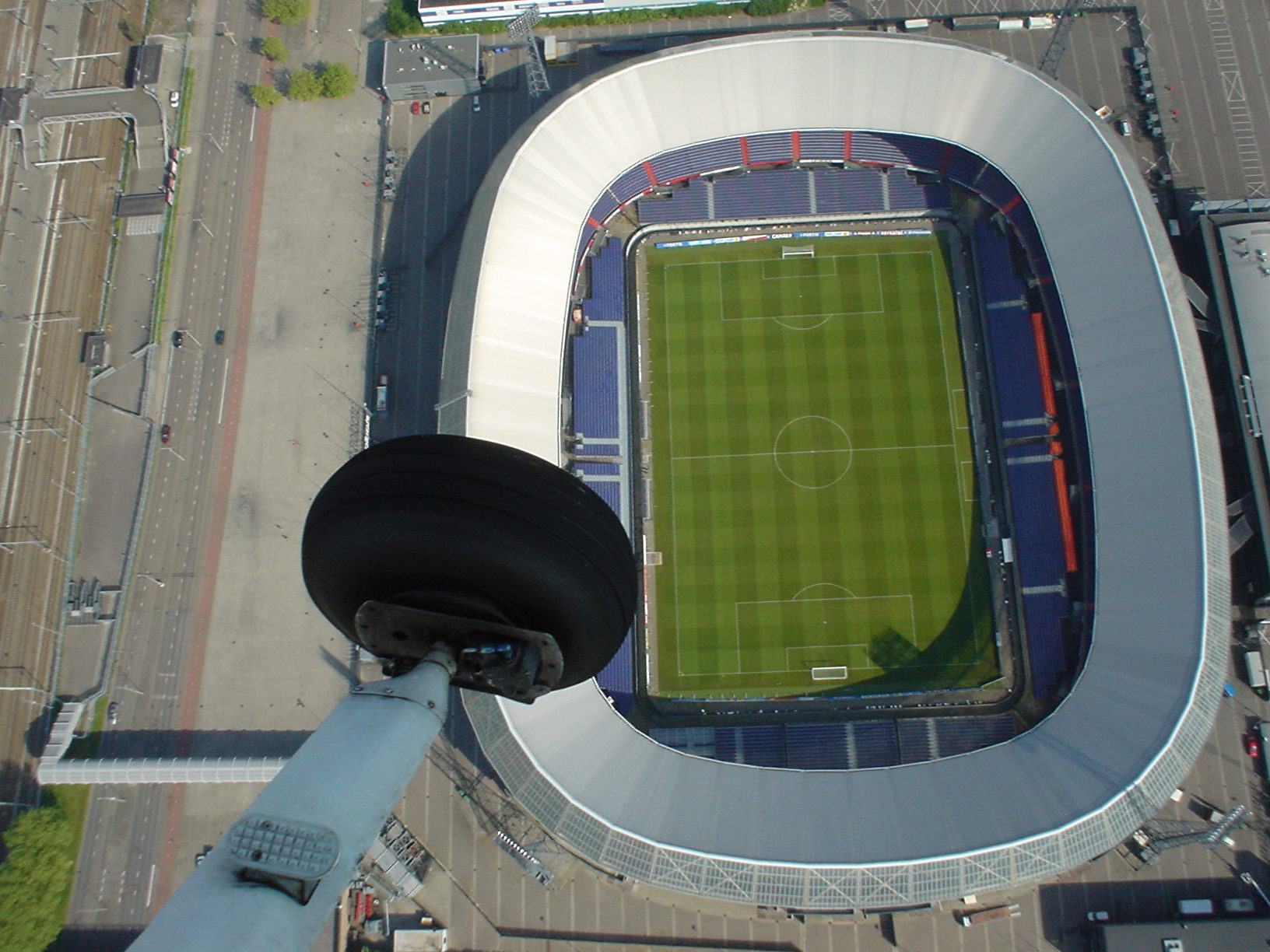
De Kuip from above

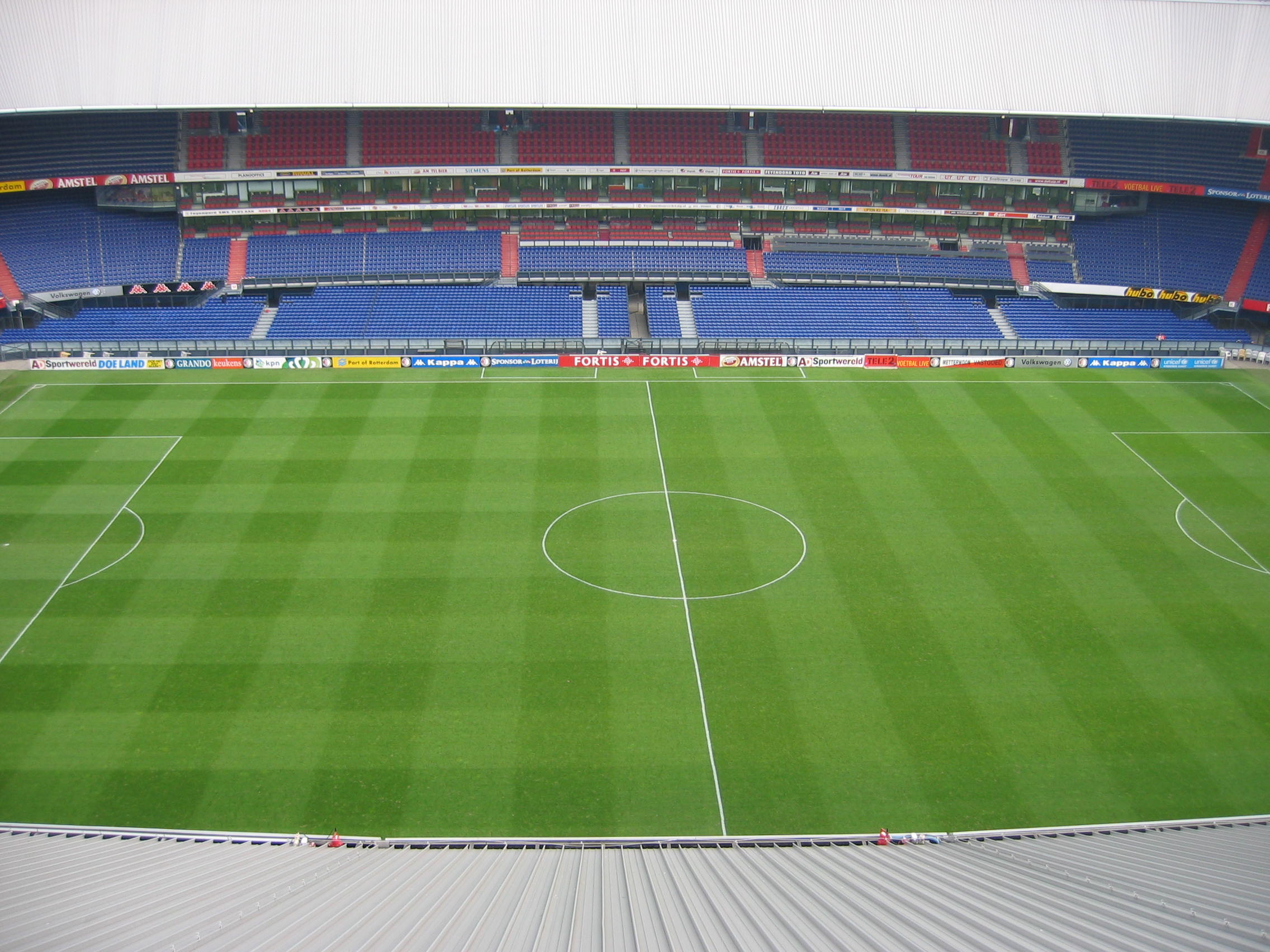
Inside the stadium

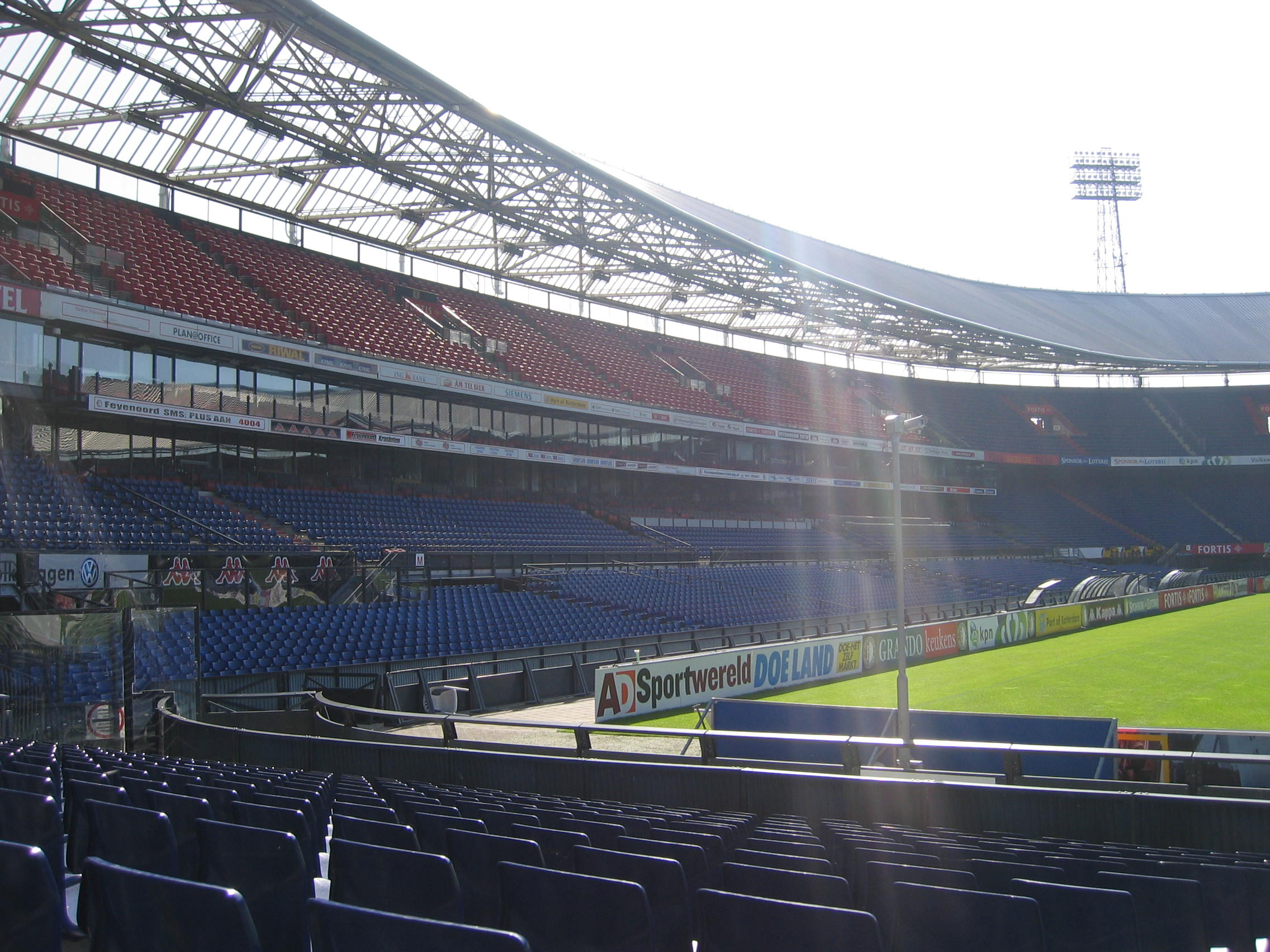
Another view inside the stadium

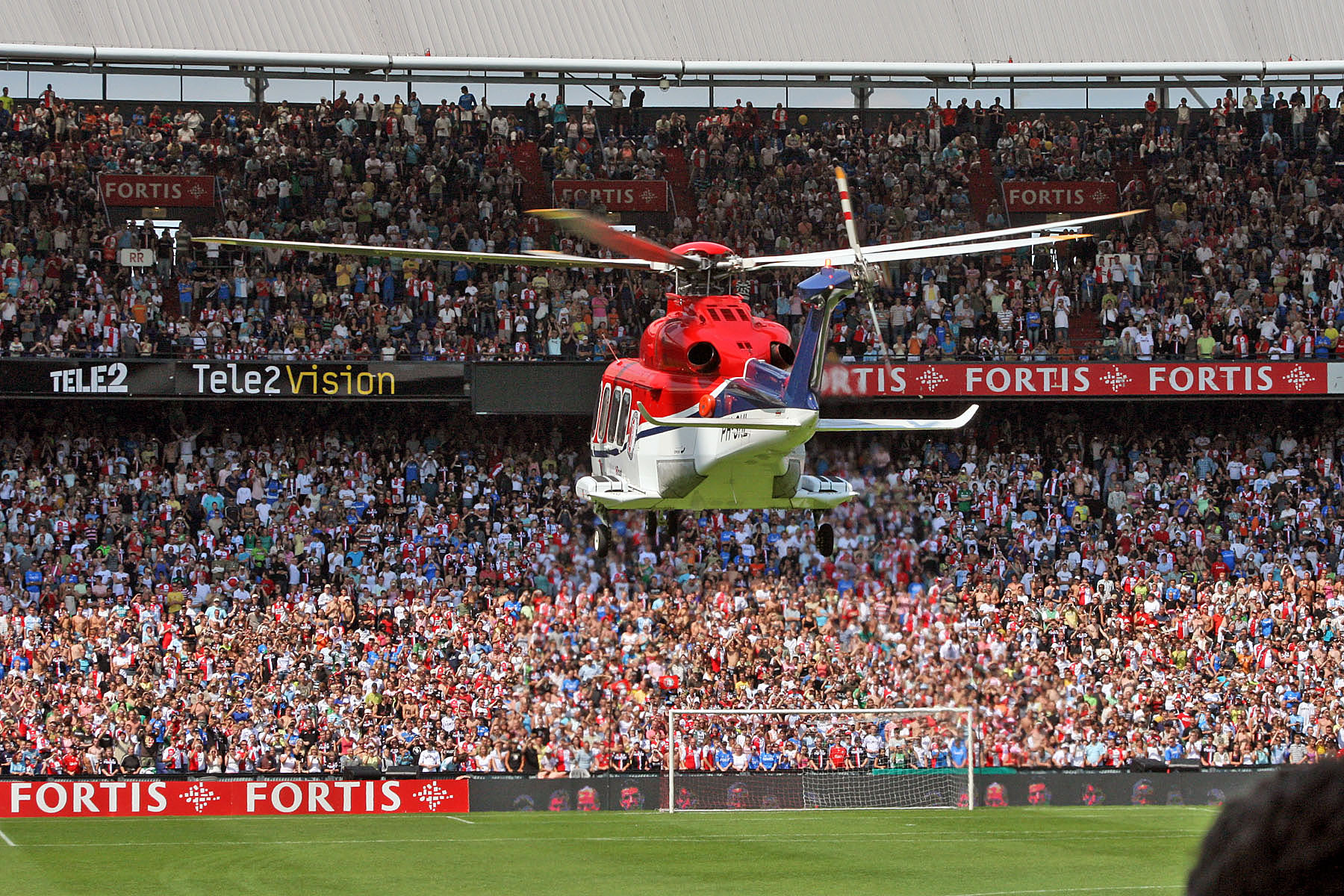
Feyenoord helicopter entering the stadium

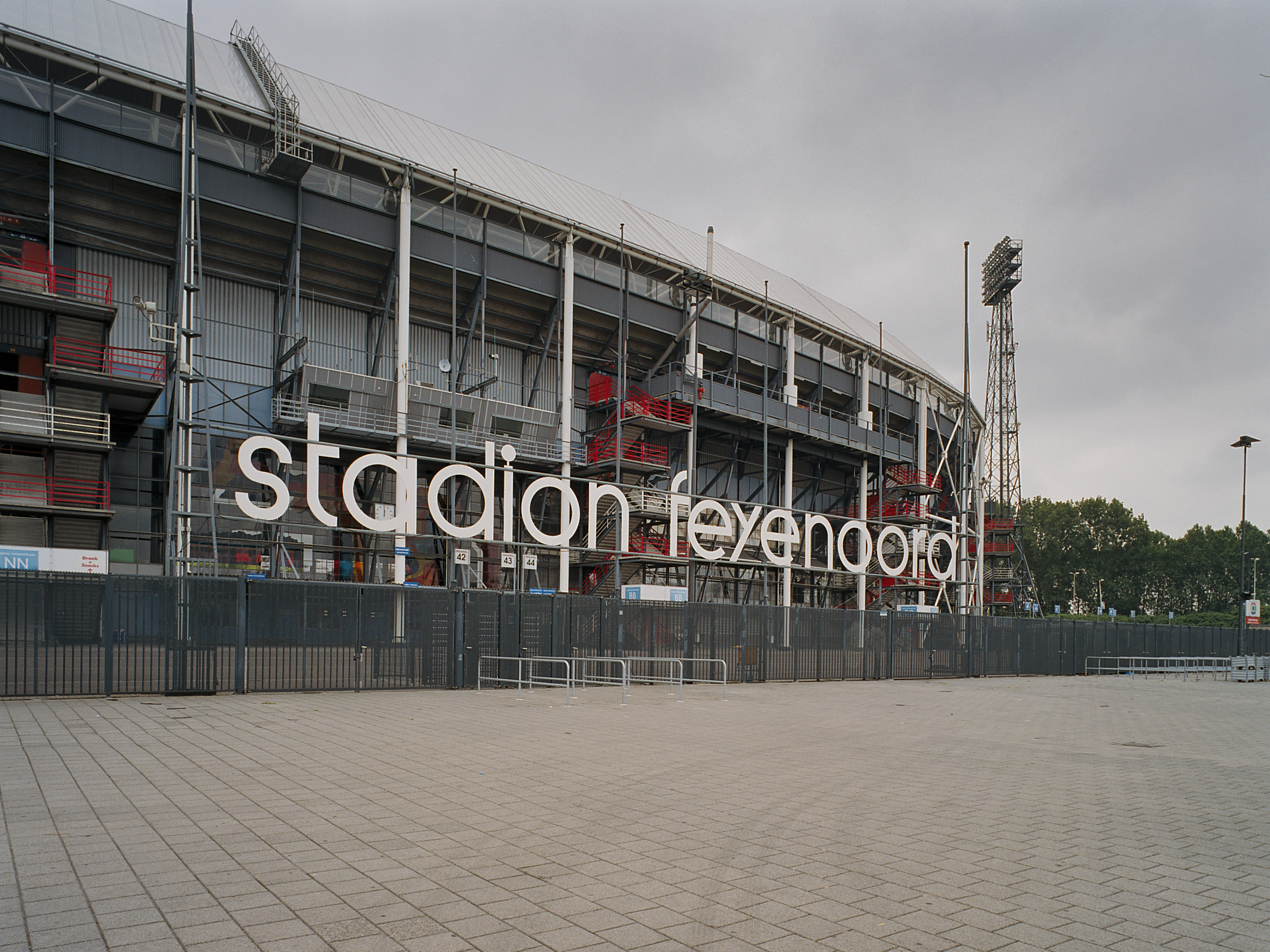

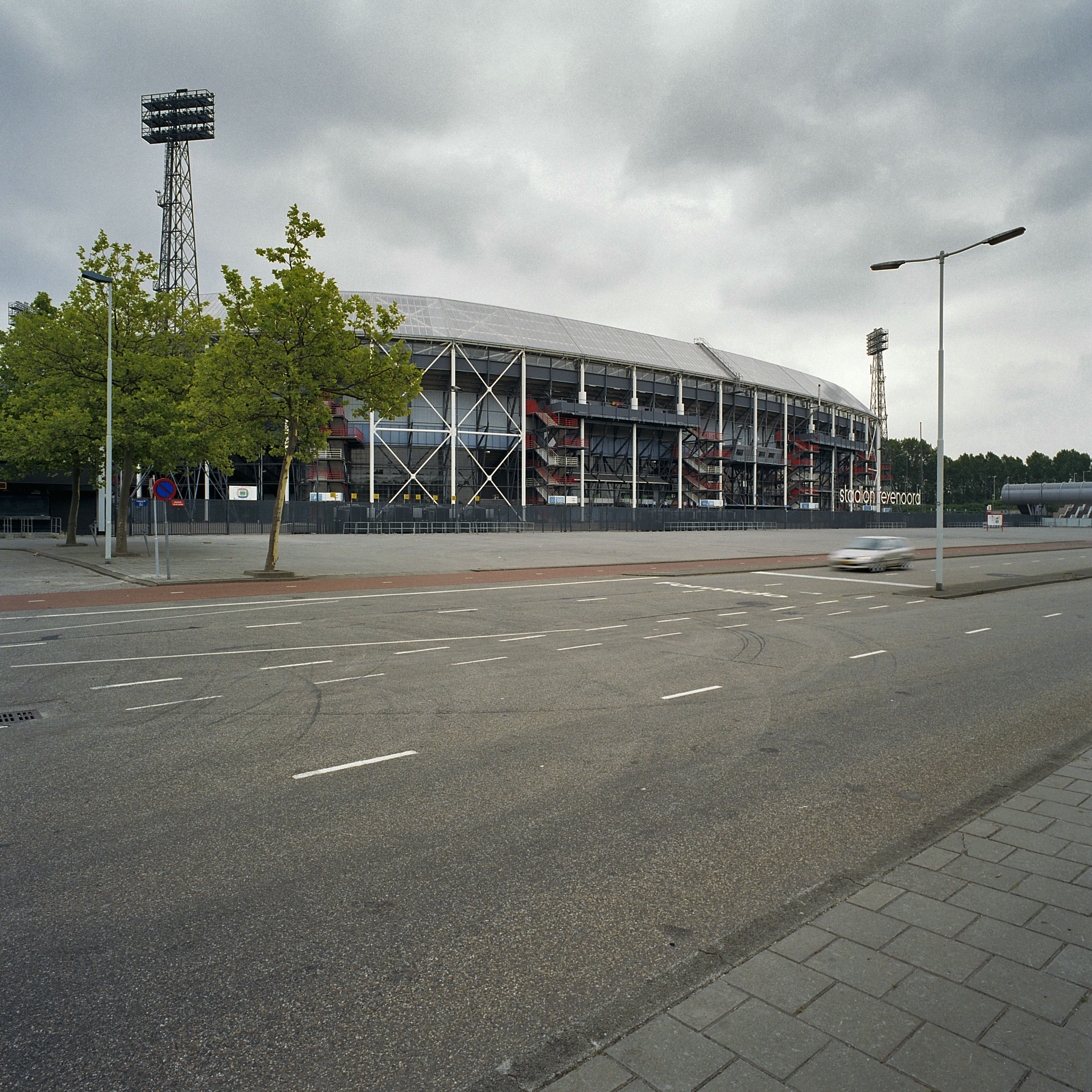

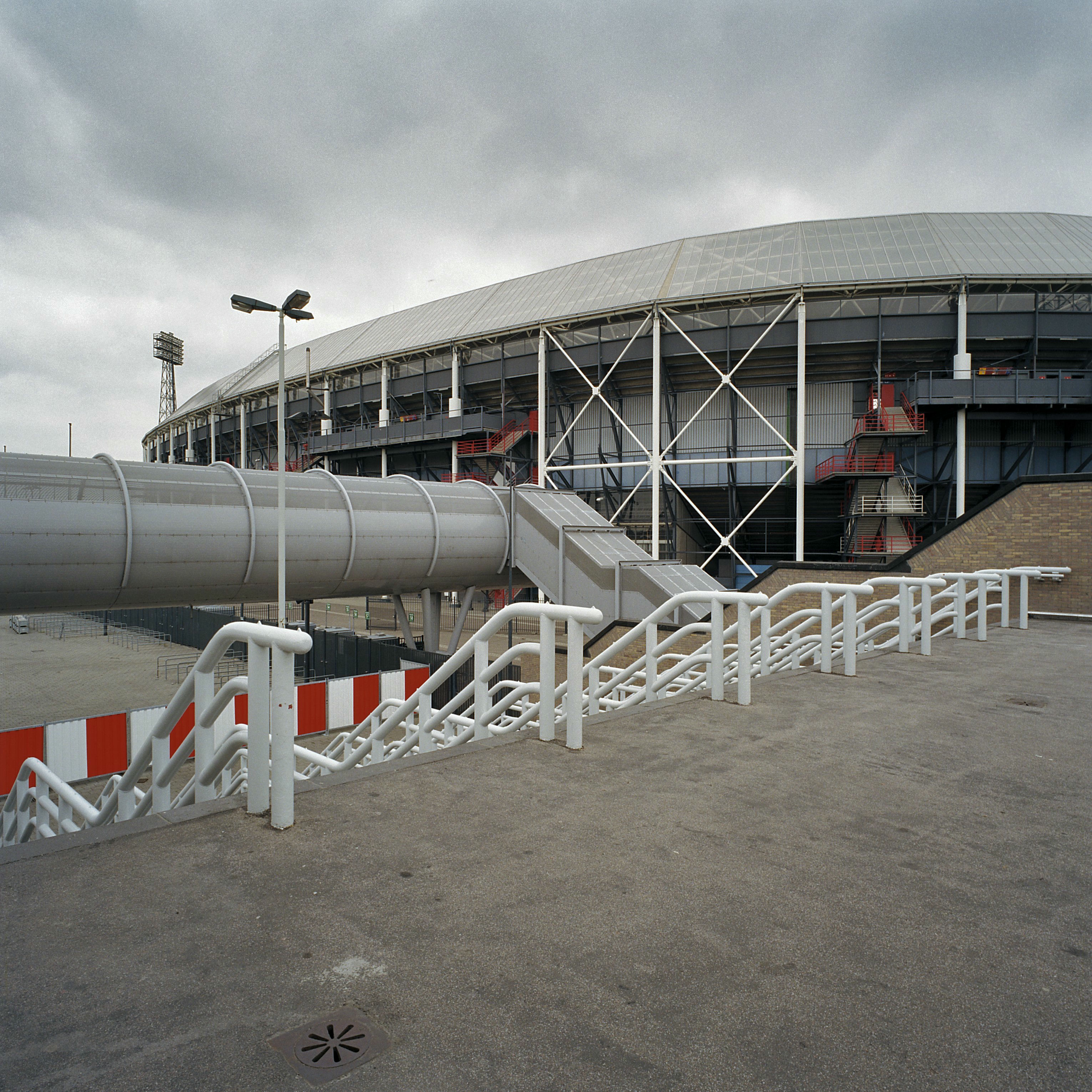

== See also ==
- Football in the Netherlands
- Lists of stadiums
- UEFA

Events and tenants
Preceded by Hampden Park; Glasgow	European Cup Winners' Cup; Final venue 1963	Succeeded by Heysel Stadium; Brussels
Preceded by Städtisches Stadion; Nuremberg	European Cup Winners' Cup; Final venue 1968	Succeeded by St. Jakob Stadium; Basel
Preceded by Wembley Stadium; London	European Cup; Final venue 1972	Succeeded by Stadion Crvena Zvezda; Belgrade
Preceded by Kaftanzoglio Stadium; Salonika	European Cup Winners' Cup; Final venue 1974	Succeeded by St. Jakob Stadium; Basel
Preceded by Parc des Princes; Paris	European Cup; Final venue 1982	Succeeded by Olympic Stadium; Athens
Preceded by St. Jakob Stadium; Basel	European Cup Winners' Cup; Final venue 1985	Succeeded by Stade de Gerland; Lyon
Preceded by Wankdorf Stadium; Bern	European Cup Winners' Cup; Final venue 1991	Succeeded by Estádio da Luz; Lisbon
Preceded by King Baudouin Stadium; Brussels	UEFA Cup Winners' Cup; Final venue 1997	Succeeded by Råsunda Stadium; Stockholm
Preceded by Wembley Stadium; London	UEFA European Championship; Final venue 2000	Succeeded by Estádio da Luz; Lisbon
Preceded by Westfalenstadion; Dortmund	UEFA Cup; Final venue 2002	Succeeded by Estadio Olímpico de Sevilla; Seville
Preceded by San Siro; Juventus Stadium	UEFA Nations League; Finals venue 2023 with De Grolsch Veste	Succeeded by Allianz Arena; MHPArena
