= Peter Baker (footballer, born 1931) =

English footballer

Personal information
- Full name: Peter Russell Baker
- Date of birth: 10 December 1931
- Place of birth: Hampstead, London, England
- Date of death: 27 January 2016 (aged 84)
- Position: Right back

Senior career*
| Years | Team | Apps | (Gls) |
| –1952 | Enfield | | |
| 1952–1965 | Tottenham Hotspur | 299 | (3) |
| 1965–1967 | Durban United | 38 | (0) |
| 1967–1968 | Romford | | |
| 1970 | Durban United | 2 | (0) |
- * Club domestic league appearances and goals

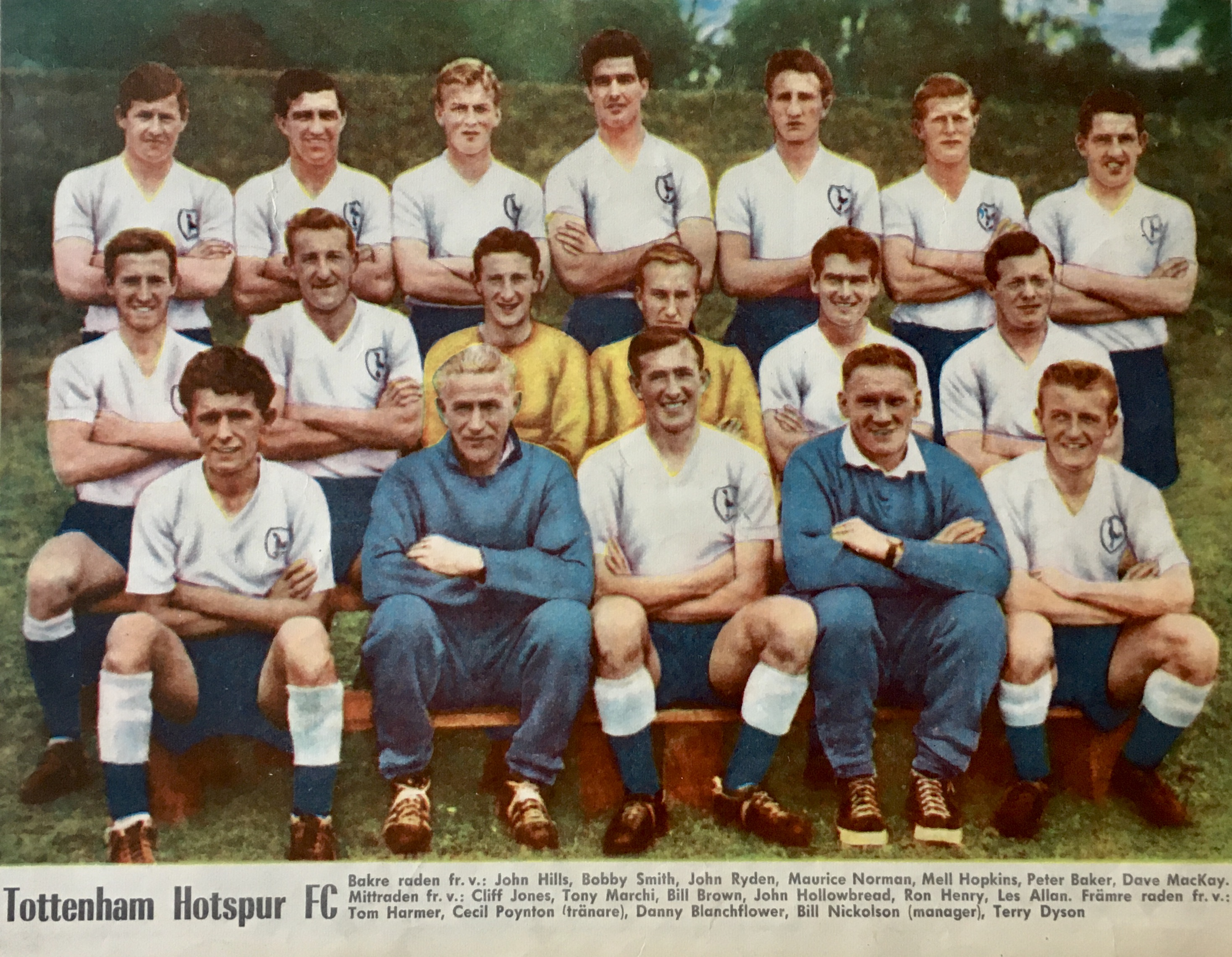
Tottenham Hotspur in 1960 with Danny Blanchflower (captain) and both goalkeepers, Bill Brown and John Hollowbread, in the team with Cecil Poynton as trainer and Bill Nicholson as manager. Peter Baker is player number six standing.

Peter Baker (10 December 1931 – 27 January 2016) was an English footballer. Educated at Southgate County School in North London, he played right-back for Tottenham Hotspur and was part of the double-winning side of 1960-61 and won the FA Cup with Spurs in 1962. He played 299 league games for Tottenham scoring three goals.

== Playing career ==
Baker joined Tottenham Hotspur from non-League club Enfield in October 1952. After a slow start at Spurs he gained a place in the first team and quickly improved and went on to play a key role in the Spurs Double-winning side of 1960–61.

He stayed with them until the end of the 1964-65 season, keeping a regular place in the team from the 1960–61 season until the end of the 1963-64 season, when he was replaced by Cyril Knowles. After leaving White Hart Lane Baker emigrated to South Africa, where he joined Durban United and later became the club's manager.

== Post-football career ==
After retiring from the game he settled in Durban, South Africa, where he ran an office and stationery business.

He has been included in the Tottenham Hotspur Hall of Fame. He died in 2016 following an illness, aged 84.

== Honours ==
Tottenham Hotspur

- Football League First Division: 1960–61
- FA Cup: 1960–61, 1961–62
- European Cup Winners Cup: 1962–63
