= 1960–61 Tottenham Hotspur F.C. season =

English football club season

Tottenham Hotspur
1960–61 season
- Chairman: Fred Bearman
- Manager: Bill Nicholson
- First Division: 1st
- FA Cup: Winners
- Top goalscorer: League: Bobby Smith (28); All: Bobby Smith (33)
- Highest home attendance: 65,930 v West Ham United – 24 December 1960
- Lowest home attendance: 35,753 v Nottingham Forest – 24 April 1961
Home colours	Away colours

The 1960–61 season was Tottenham Hotspur Football Club's 43rd of competitive football and 11th consecutive year in the English top flight. It was also the club's most successful year ever up to that point, as they won the Football League First Division for the second time and the FA Cup for the third time, thus becoming the third English club to achieve the league and FA Cup Double.

== Results ==
=== Final league table ===
Pos	Team	Pld	W	D	L	GF	GA	GAv	Pts	Qualification or relegation
1	Tottenham Hotspur (C)	42	31	4	7	115	55	2.091	66	Qualification for the European Cup preliminary round
2	Sheffield Wednesday	42	23	12	7	78	47	1.660	58	Qualification for the Inter-Cities Fairs Cup first round
3	Wolverhampton Wanderers	42	25	7	10	103	75	1.373	57	
4	Burnley	42	22	7	13	102	77	1.325	51	
5	Everton	42	22	6	14	87	69	1.261	50	

Source: World Football
Rules for classification: 1) Points; 2) Goal average; 3) Goals scored
(C) Champions

=== First Division ===
Tottenham were crowned champions after their game against Sheffield Wednesday at White Hart Lane, which they won 2–1.

Date	Opponent	Venue	Result	Attendance	Scorers
20 Aug 1960	Everton	White Hart Lane	2–0	50,393	Smith, Allen
22 Aug 1960	Blackpool	Bloomfield Road	3–1	27,656	Medwin, Dyson (2)
27 Aug 1960	Blackburn Rovers	Ewood Park	4–1	26,819	Smith (2), Allen, Dyson
31 Aug 1960	Blackpool	White Hart Lane	3–1	45,684	Smith (3)
3 Sep 1960	Manchester United	White Hart Lane	4–1	55,442	Smith (2), Allen (2)
7 Sep 1960	Bolton Wanderers	Burnden Park	2–1	41,565	White, Allen
10 Sep 1960	Arsenal	Highbury	3–2	59,868	Saul, Allen, Dyson
14 Sep 1960	Bolton Wanderers	White Hart Lane	3–1	43,559	Blanchflower (pen), Smith (2)
17 Sep 1960	Leicester City	Filbert Street	2–1	30,129	Smith (2)
24 Sep 1960	Aston Villa	White Hart Lane	6–2	61,356	Mackay, White (2), Smith, Allen, Dyson
1 Oct 1960	Wolverhampton Wanderers	Molineux	4–0	52,829	Blanchflower, Jones, Allen, Dyson
10 Oct 1960	Manchester City	White Hart Lane	1–1	58,916	Smith
15 Oct 1960	Nottingham Forest	City Ground	4–0	37,248	Mackay, Jones (2), White
29 Oct 1960	Newcastle United	St James' Park	4–3	51,369	Norman, Jones, White, Smith
2 Nov 1960	Cardiff City	White Hart Lane	3–2	47,605	Blanchflower (pen), Medwin, Dyson
5 Nov 1960	Fulham	White Hart Lane	5–1	56,270	Jones (2), White, Allen (2)
12 Nov 1960	Sheffield Wednesday	Hillsborough	1–2	53,988	Norman
19 Nov 1960	Birmingham City	White Hart Lane	6–0	46,010	Jones (2), White, Smith (pen), Dyson (2)
26 Nov 1960	West Bromwich Albion	The Hawthorns	3–1	39,017	Smith (2), Allen
3 Dec 1960	Burnley	White Hart Lane	4–4	58,737	Norman, Mackay, Jones (2)
10 Dec 1960	Preston North End	Deepdale	1–0	21,657	Smith
17 Dec 1960	Everton	Goodison Park	3–1	61,052	Mackay, White, Allen
24 Dec 1960	West Ham United	White Hart Lane	2–0	65,930	White, Dyson
26 Dec 1960	West Ham United	Upton Park	3–0	34,351	White, Allen, Brown (og)
31 Dec 1960	Blackburn Rovers	White Hart Lane	5–2	48,742	Blanchflower, Smith (2), Allen (2)
16 Jan 1961	Manchester United	Old Trafford	0–2	65,535	
21 Jan 1961	Arsenal	White Hart Lane	4–2	65,251	Blanchflower (pen), Smith 2, Allen
4 Feb 1961	Leicester City	White Hart Lane	2–3	53,627	Blanchflower (pen), Allen
11 Feb 1961	Aston Villa	Villa Park	2–1	50,786	Smith, Dyson
22 Feb 1961	Wolverhampton Wanderers	White Hart Lane	1–1	62,261	Smith
25 Feb 1961	Manchester City	Maine Road	1–0	40,278	Medwin
11 Mar 1961	Cardiff City	Ninian Park	2–3	45,463	Allen, Dyson
22 Mar 1961	Newcastle United	White Hart Lane	1–2	46,470	Allen
25 Mar 1961	Fulham	Craven Cottage	0–0	38,536	
31 Mar 1961	Chelsea	White Hart Lane	4–2	65,032	Jones (2), Saul, Allen
1 Apr 1961	Preston North End	White Hart Lane	5–0	46,325	Jones (3), White, Saul
3 Apr 1961	Chelsea	Stamford Bridge	3–2	57,103	Norman, Smith, Medwin
8 Apr 1961	Birmingham City	St Andrew's	3–2	40,961	White, Smith, Allen
17 Apr 1961	Sheffield Wednesday	White Hart Lane	2–1	61,205	Smith, Allen
22 Apr 1961	Burnley	Turf Moor	2–4	28,991	Baker, Smith
26 Apr 1961	Nottingham Forest	White Hart Lane	1–0	35,753	Medwin
29 Apr 1961	West Bromwich Albion	White Hart Lane	1–2	52,054	Smith

_{Source:}

=== FA Cup ===
Date	Round	Opponent	Venue	Result	Attendance	Scorers
7 Jan 1961	R3	Charlton Athletic (2)	White Hart Lane	3–2	54,969	Allen (2), Dyson
28 Jan 1961	R4	Crewe Alexandra (4)	White Hart Lane	5–1	53,721	Mackay, Jones, Smith, Allen, Dyson
18 Feb 1961	R5	Aston Villa (1)	Villa Park	2–0	69,000	Jones (2)
4 Mar 1961	QF	Sunderland (2)	Roker Park	1–1	63,000	Jones
8 Mar 1961	QF Replay	Sunderland (2)	White Hart Lane	5–0	64,797	Mackay, Smith, Allen, Dyson (2)
18 Mar 1961	SF	Burnley (1)	Villa Park	3–0	69,968	Jones, Smith (2)
6 May 1961	F	Leicester City (1)	Wembley Stadium	2–0	100,000	Smith, Dyson

_{Source:}

== Players used ==
Pos.	Nationality	Player	Football League	FA Cup	Total	Goal
1	Scotland	Bill Brown	41	7	48	0
2	England	Peter Baker	41	7	48	1
3	England	Ron Henry	42	7	49	0
4	Northern Ireland	Danny Blanchflower (c)	42	7	49	6
5	England	Maurice Norman	41	7	48	4
6	Scotland	Dave Mackay	37	7	44	6
7	Wales	Cliff Jones	29	5	34	20
8	Scotland	John White	42	7	49	13
9	England	Bobby Smith	36	7	43	32
10	England	Les Allen	42	7	49	26
11	England	Terry Dyson	40	7	47	17
12	Wales	Terry Medwin	14	2	16	6
13	England	Frank Saul	6	0	6	3
14	England	Tony Marchi	6	0	6	0
15	England	John Hollowbread	1	0	1	0
16	Wales	Ken Barton	1	0	1	0
17	England	John Smith	1	0	1	0

=== Top scorer ===
P.	Nationality	Player	Position	Football League	FA Cup	Total
1	England	Bobby Smith	Striker	28	5	33
2	England	Les Allen	Striker	22	4	26
3	Wales	Cliff Jones	Right wing	15	5	20
4	England	Terry Dyson	Left wing	12	5	17
5	Scotland	John White	Midfielder	13	0	13

=== Most appearances ===
P.	Nationality	Player	Position	Football League	FA Cup	Total
1	Northern Ireland	Danny Blanchflower	Midfielder	42	7	49
2	England	Ron Henry	Defender	42	7	49
3	Scotland	John White	Midfielder	42	7	49
4	England	Les Allen	Forward	42	7	49
5	England	Maurice Norman	Defender	41	7	48

_{Source:}

== First Division results by round ==
Round	1	2	3	4	5	6	7	8	9	10	11	12	13	14	15	16	17	18	19	20	21	22	23	24	25	26	27	28	29	30	31	32	33	34	35	36	37	38	39	40	41	42
Ground	H	A	A	H	H	A	A	H	A	H	A	H	A	A	H	H	A	H	A	H	A	A	H	A	H	A	H	H	A	H	A	A	H	A	H	H	A	A	H	A	H	H
Result	W	W	W	W	W	W	W	W	W	W	W	D	W	W	W	W	L	W	W	D	W	W	W	W	W	L	W	L	W	D	W	L	L	D	W	W	W	W	W	L	W	L
Position	6	1	1	1	1	1	1	1	1	1	1	1	1	1	1	1	1	1	1	1	1	1	1	1	1	1	1	1	1	1	1	1	1	1	1	1	1	1	1	1	1	1

A = Away; H = Home; W = Win; D = Draw; L = Loss
