= John Ryden =

Scottish footballer

Personal information
- Full name: John Johnston Ryden
- Date of birth: 18 February 1931
- Place of birth: Bonhill, Scotland
- Date of death: 16 August 2013 (aged 82)
- Place of death: London, England
- Position: Centre half

Youth career
- ?–1950: Duntocher Hibernian

Senior career*
Years	Team	Apps	(Gls)
1950–1954	Alloa Athletic	83	(7)
1954–1955	Accrington Stanley	80	(1)
1955–1959	Tottenham Hotspur	63	(2)
1961–1962	Watford	24	(1)
1962–1965	Romford	66	(2)
1965–1966	Tunbridge Wells Rangers		
- Bexley United
- * Club domestic league appearances and goals

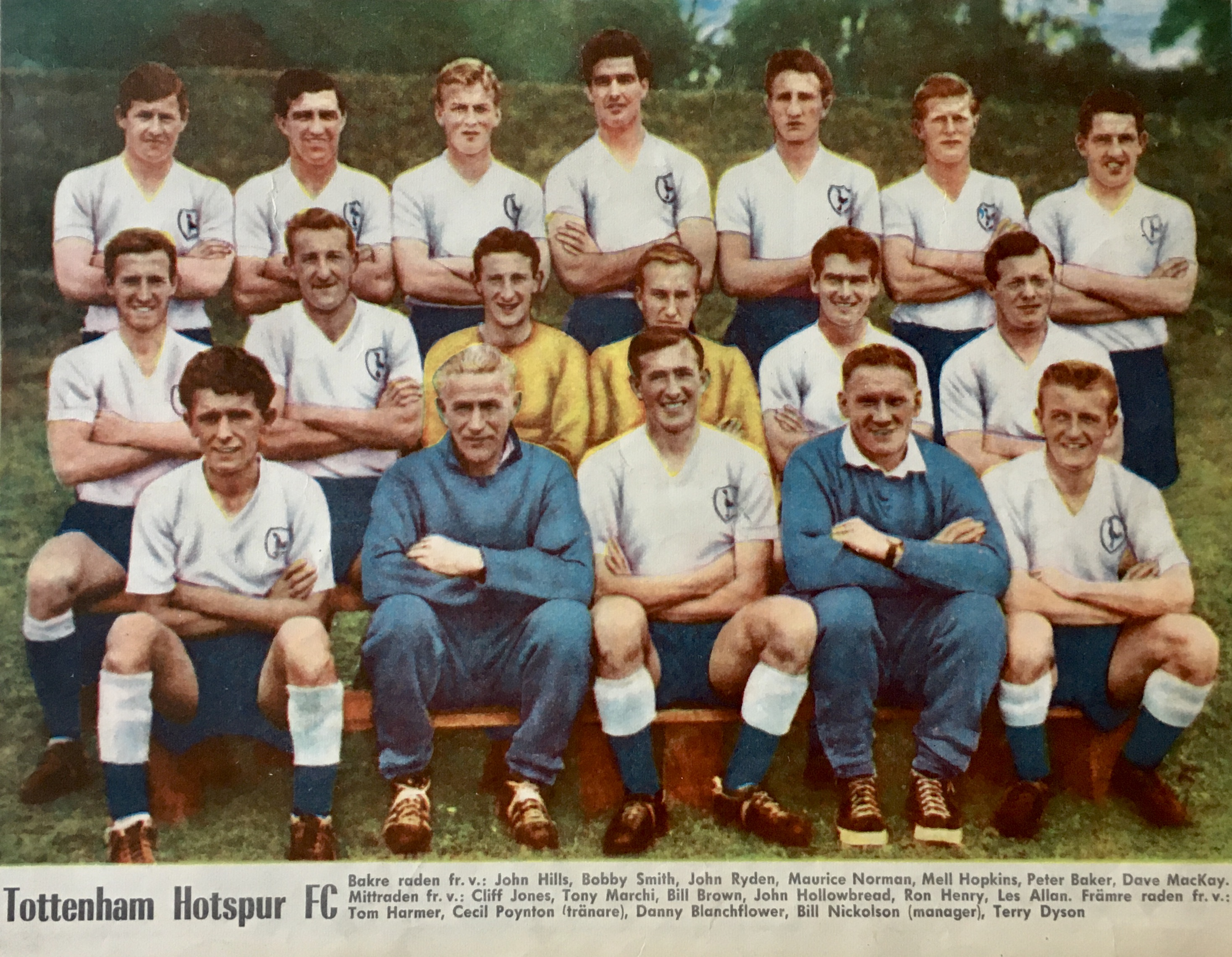
Tottenham Hotspur in 1960 with Danny Blanchflower (captain) and both goalkeepers, Bill Brown and John Hollowbread, in the team with Cecil Poynton as trainer and Bill Nicholson as manager. John Ryden is the third player standing.

John Johnston Ryden (18 February 1931 – 16 August 2013) was a Scottish professional footballer who played for Duntocher Hibernian, Alloa Athletic, Accrington Stanley, Tottenham Hotspur, Watford, Romford, Tunbridge Wells Rangers and Bexley Utd

== Playing career ==
Ryden began his career at non-League club Duntocher Hibernian before signing for Alloa Athletic on 13 May 1950. The strong tackling, uncompromising, centre half made 108 appearances in all competitions and scored 13 goals in three seasons.

In February 1954 he joined Accrington Stanley in a £1,000 transfer deal where he scored once in 80 matches.

Tottenham Hotspur paid £10,000 for his services in November 1955. Ryden spent five seasons at the White Hart Lane club and was made club captain in the 1957–58 season. He made a total of 68 appearances and found the net on two occasions in all competitions between 1955 and 1959. Scoring on his debut in a 3-3 draw against Preston North End at Deepdale in April 1956. And Ryden was involved in two memorable matches for the 'Lilywhites'. In the first 4-4 draw against rivals Arsenal on 22 February 1958 at Highbury. Ryden featured again in manager Bill Nicholson's first game in charge on 11 October 1958 at White Hart Lane in a 10-4 victory over Everton Ryden was listed as one of the top 12 Scots to wear the Spurs shirt.

In June 1961 he joined Watford and went on to make a further 24 appearances and scoring one goal. He then moved into non-League football with Romford before joining Tunbridge Wells Rangers in 1965. Ryden later played for Bexley United as a player/manager where he ended his career.

== Post–football career ==
After his football career had ended, Ryden was employed by a finance and insurance broker in the companies offices at Maidstone and later in Richmond.

== Death ==
Ryden died on 16 August 2013 at his home in the London Borough of Bromley at Keston aged 82.
