= Ron Henry =

English footballer

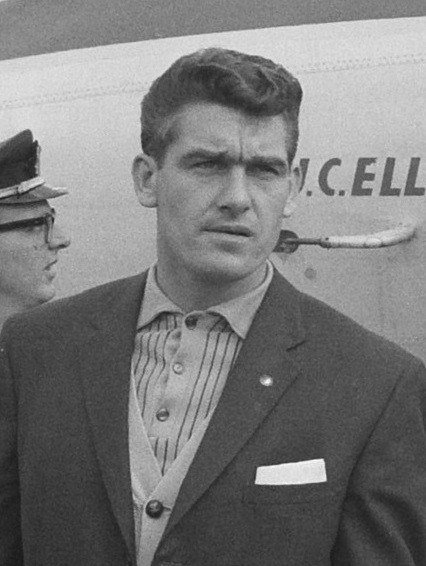

Personal information
- Full name: Ronald Patrick Henry
- Date of birth: 17 August 1934
- Place of birth: Shoreditch, London, England
- Date of death: 27 December 2014 (aged 80)
- Place of death: Harpenden, Hertfordshire, England
- Position: Left back

Senior career*
Years	Team	Apps	(Gls)
1952–1966	Tottenham Hotspur	247	(1)

International career
1963	England	1	(0)
- * Club domestic league appearances and goals

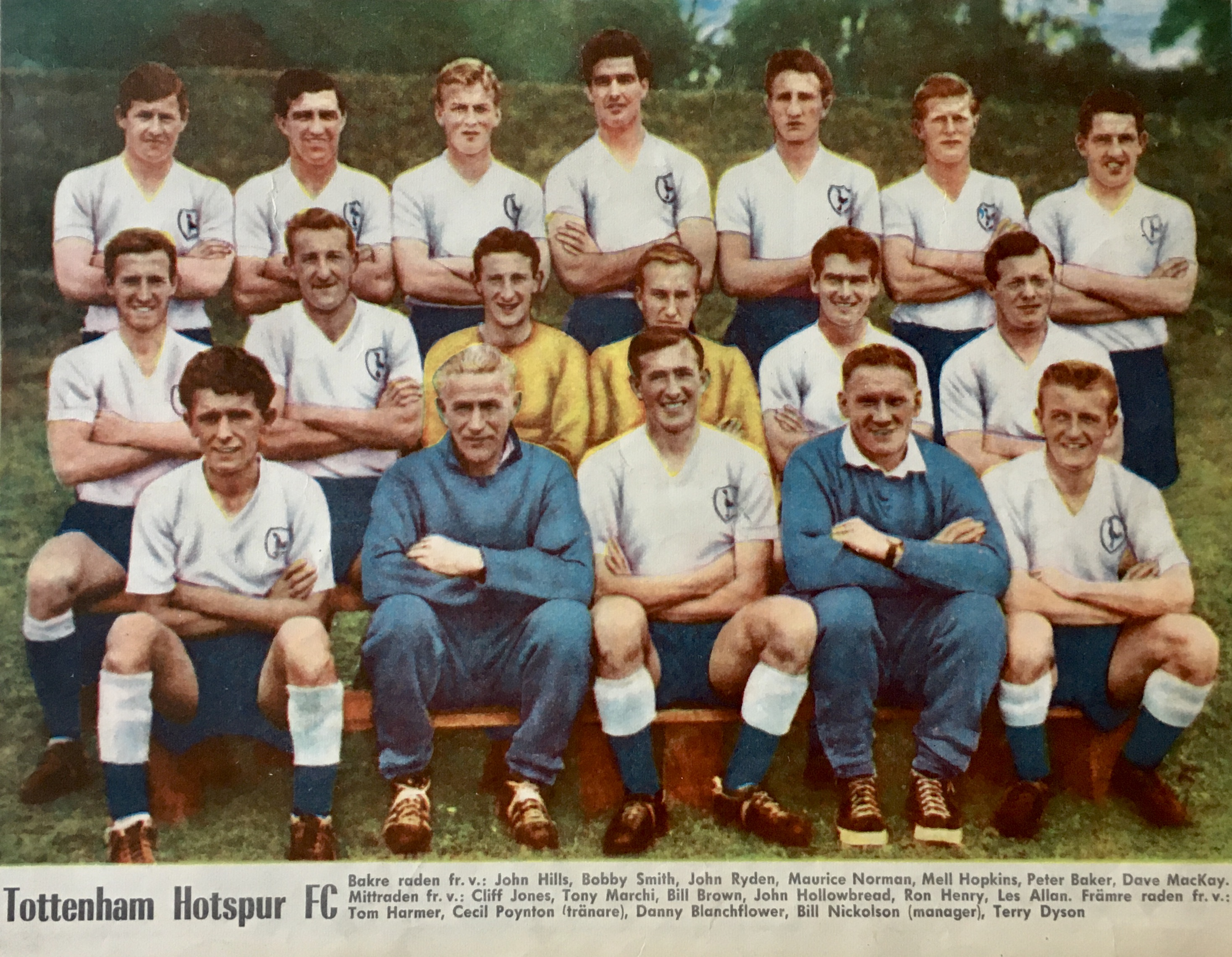
Tottenham Hotspur in 1960 with Danny Blanchflower (captain) and both goalkeepers, Bill Brown and John Hollowbread, in the team with Cecil Poynton as trainer and Bill Nicholson as manager. Ron Henry sitting in the middle row as number five from left.

Ronald Patrick Henry (17 August 1934 – 27 December 2014) was a footballer who played for Tottenham Hotspur, and won one cap for England. His grandson, Ronnie, is also a professional footballer.

== Club career ==
Henry joined Tottenham in 1952 from Redbourn, and made his debut in 1955 as a centre half, but was soon converted to left back. He was a regular in Spurs' defence for many years, and his honours include being a member of The Double winning side of 1961, the 1962 FA Cup, and the European Cup Winners Cup in 1963. Overall, Henry played 247 league games for Tottenham, scoring one goal.

== International career ==
On 27 February 1963, he represented England in a European Championship qualifier against France in Paris. This turned out to be his only international appearance as England lost 5–2.

== Personal life ==
Henry lived in Redbourn, Hertfordshire and owned a 14-acre (57,000 m^{2}) bedding plant nursery, as well as many homing pigeons. He had remained involved with Tottenham Hotspur, as an assistant to the Under-18 side. On 27 December 2014, he died at the age of 80. There was a minute's applause for Henry before Tottenham's first game at White Hart Lane after his death, on 28 December against Manchester United.

His grandson, Ronnie Henry, currently plays for non-league side Royston Town, but is most known for his time at Stevenage, where he became the first ever captain to lift a competitive trophy at the new Wembley Stadium.

== Honours ==
Tottenham Hotspur

- Football League First Division: 1960–61
- FA Cup: 1960–61, 1961–62
- European Cup Winners' Cup: 1962–63
