= 1961 FA Charity Shield =

- Event: FA Charity Shield
Tottenham Hotspur	F.A. XI
3	2
- Date: 12 August 1961
- Venue: White Hart Lane, London
- Referee: Dick Windle
- Attendance: 36,593

The 1961 FA Charity Shield was the 39th FA Charity Shield. The match was contested on 12 August 1961 between double winners Tottenham Hotspur and a Football Association (F.A.) representative eleven. Tottenham won the match 3–2.

In the 1960–61 season, Tottenham had become the first club since Aston Villa in 1897 to complete the Double, that is, to win the FA Cup and Division One in the same season. The Charity Shield, which was first contested in 1908, is conventionally held between the previous season's league champions and the FA Cup winners. Thus Tottenham's double victory in 1960–1961 presented a new problem for the FA in organising the 1961 Charity Shield. By way of resolution, Tottenham competed against a representative side who played under the banner of the FA. This team was, in practice, the contemporary England national team, without the Tottenham players who might usually have played.

Tottenham started the match poorly when Johnny Haynes scored the opening goal after ten minutes. Tottenham equalised five minutes before half time through Bobby Smith, and Les Allen scored two second half goals for Spurs to put them 3–1 ahead. Johnny Byrne scored the second goal for the F.A., resulting in a 3–2 victory for Tottenham.

The 1961 Charity Shield was the last time, to date, that the match featured a team that was not a club side. The 1971 Double winning Arsenal team was unable to compete, so FA Cup runners-up Liverpool played against Division Two champions Leicester City. In the 1986 Charity Shield, following Liverpool's Double-winning 1985–1986 season, league runners-up Everton were chosen as opponents. This practice has been followed in all subsequent years where a team has won the Double.

== Match details ==
12 August 1961

Tottenham Hotspur	3–2	F.A. XI
Smith 40'; Allen 68', 76'		Haynes 10'; Byrne 80'

White Hart Lane, London
Attendance: 36,493

Tottenham Hotspur	F.A. XI

1	(Scotland) Bill Brown
2	(England) Peter Baker
3	(England) Ron Henry
4	(Northern Ireland) Danny Blanchflower (c)
5	(England) Maurice Norman
6	(Scotland) Dave Mackay
7	(Wales) Cliff Jones
8	(Scotland) John White
9	(England) Bobby Smith
10	(England) Les Allen
11	(England) Terry Dyson
Manager:
(England) Bill Nicholson

1	(England) Ron Springett (Sheffield Wednesday)
2	(England) Jimmy Armfield (Blackpool)
3	(England) Michael McNeil (Middlesbrough)
4	(England) Bobby Robson (West Bromwich Albion)
5	(England) Peter Swan (Sheffield Wednesday)
6	(England) Ron Flowers (Wolverhampton Wanderers)
7	(England) Bryan Douglas (Blackburn Rovers)
8	(England) Jimmy Robson (Burnley)
9	(England) Johnny Byrne (Crystal Palace)
10	(England) Johnny Haynes (c) (Fulham)
11	(England) Bobby Charlton (Manchester United)
Manager:
(England) Walter Winterbottom
