= Terry Dyson =

English footballer (1934–2026)

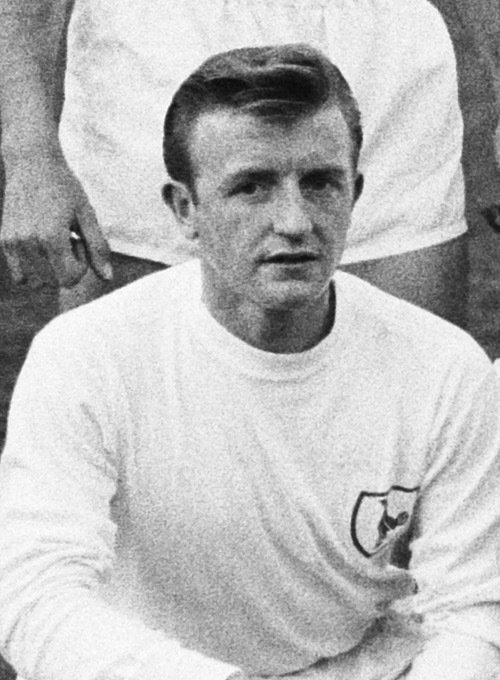
- Dyson at the European Cup Winners' Cup final in 1963

Personal information
- Full name: Terence Kent Dyson
- Date of birth: 29 November 1934
- Place of birth: Malton, North Riding of Yorkshire, England
- Date of death: 20 August 2026 (aged 91)
- Position: Winger

Senior career*
Years	Team	Apps	(Gls)
1951–1953	Scarborough		
1955–1965	Tottenham Hotspur	184	(41)
1965–1968	Fulham	23	(3)
1968–1970	Colchester United	56	(4)
1970–1972	Guildford City	109	(0)
- * Club domestic league appearances and goals

Terence Kent Dyson (29 November 1934 – 20 August 2026) was an English footballer who played as a winger. He was a regular member of the Tottenham Hotspur Double-winning side of the 1960–61 season, and he scored in the FA Cup Final against Leicester. He was also part of the first British team to have won a European trophy, scoring twice for Tottenham at the 1963 European Cup Winners' Cup Final against Atlético Madrid.

== Early life ==
Terry Dyson was born in Malton, North Yorkshire, to his father John "Ginger", who was a jockey and his mother, Jessie, a waitress. His was given the middle name Kent as he was born on the date the Duke of Kent married. He attended Malton Primary and from 1946-1952 Malton Grammar School where he played football. He played for a local club Norton United as a junior and the non-league Scarborough as a senior. Although he had intended to follow on his father's footstep as a jockey, he was too heavy despite being only 5ft 4in tall. He left school at 17 and played for Scarborough while working as an estate agent, before joining the Royal Artillery for National Service when he was 18. He played for an Army team that included Ron Henry at Woolwich.

== Career ==
=== Tottenham Hotspur ===
A scout for Tottenham Hotspur took notice of Dyson when he scored five goals for the Army Amateur XI against the Grenadier Guards. He was invited for a trial and joined Spurs as an amateur in December 1954. After being demobbed he joined Tottenham Hotspur as a professional in April 1955. He played as a winger for Tottenham, usually down the left flank.

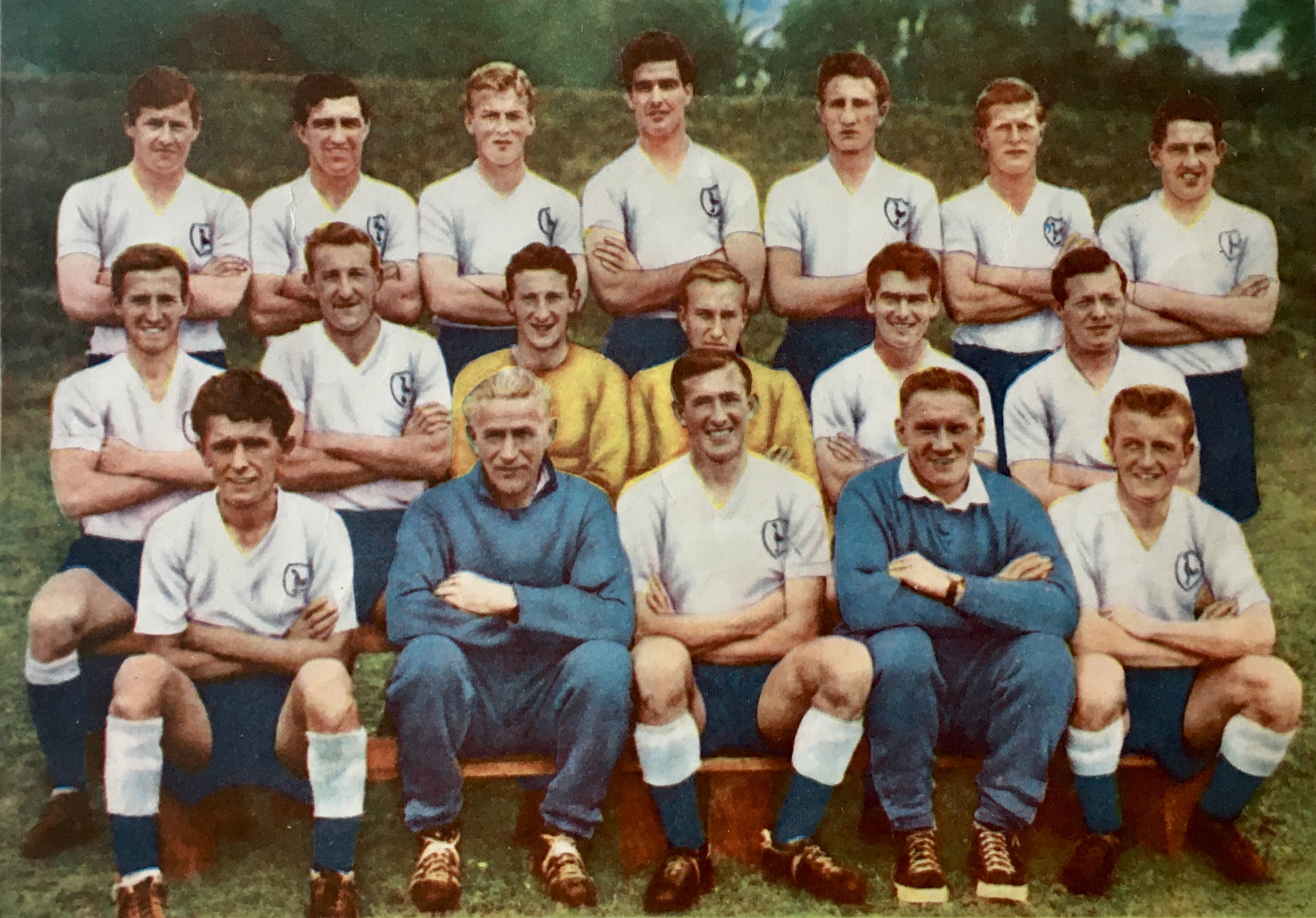
Tottenham Hotspur in 1960. Dyson sitting far right in the front row

Dyson had his first team debut for Tottenham against Sheffield United on 19 March 1955 while still an amateur, winning 5–0. Despite the successful debut, he played for the most part in the reserve team in the Football Combination until the 1959–60 season when he was selected by Bill Nicholson for the first team. He became a regular member of the Double-winning side of 1960–61, starting 47 of the 49 matches that season. He scored one of the two goals in the FA Cup Final against Leicester.

Dyson was the only Spurs player to have scored a hat-trick in the North London derby (and one out of four scoring a hat-trick in the derby), doing so on 26 August 1961 in a 4–3 win for Spurs. He said that in one of the goals the ball hit his hand accidentally. Dyson was featured in the early rounds of the 1961–62 European Cup, but was left out of the team in later rounds in favour of Terry Medwin. He was also left out of the 1962 FA Cup final.

Dyson was a member of the team that won at the 1962–63 European Cup Winners' Cup. He scored twice in the 5–1 win against Atlético Madrid at the final. With this win, Tottenham became the first British club to have won a major European trophy.

Dyson played for Tottenham for 10 years until 1965. He made a total of 209 appearances and scored 55 goals for Tottenham. He was transferred to Fulham for £5,000 in 1965.

=== Later career ===
After Tottenham, Dyson played for Fulham, Colchester United, Wealdstone and Guildford City. After three seasons at Fulham where he was often left on the bench, he made 58 appearances for Colchester between 1968 and 1970. He was part of the Guildford team that won the Southern League Division One in 1971. He made 105 appearances for Wealdstone from 1972 to 1977, while taking on a coaching role.

Dyson had a number of managerial roles in various non-league clubs, including Wingate, Boreham Wood, Ruislip, and Kingsbury Town. He worked as an assistant manager for Dagenham in the 1980 FA Trophy final, which Dagenham won 2-1.

Dyson became a sports master at Hampstead School and Highbury Grove School, among the pupils he taught were Brian, Edwin, and Mark Stein. Dyson worked part-time for the Football Association, assessing Academy matches. He also worked for the Hertfordshire Education Authority helping children with emotional and behavioural difficulties.

== Personal life and death ==
Dyson married Kay in 1966. They had three sons. His brother John played for York City and Scarborough. Dyson was the uncle of English golfer Simon Dyson.

Dyson died on 20 August 2026, aged 91.

== Honours ==
Tottenham Hotspur

- Football League First Division: 1960–61
- FA Cup: 1960–61
- European Cup Winners' Cup: 1962–63
