= Bobby Smith (footballer, born 1933) =

English footballer (1933–2010)

- Smith in 1991

Personal information
- Full name: Robert Alfred Smith
- Date of birth: 22 February 1933
- Place of birth: Lingdale, North Riding of Yorkshire, England
- Date of death: 18 September 2010 (aged 77)
- Place of death: Enfield, London, England
- Position: Centre-forward

Youth career
- Redcar Boys Club
- Chelsea

Senior career*
Years	Team	Apps	(Gls)
1950–1955	Chelsea	74	(23)
1955–1964	Tottenham Hotspur	271	(176)
1964–1965	Brighton & Hove Albion	31	(19)
1965–1967	Hastings United		
Total		376	(218)

International career
1960–1963	England	15	(13)
- * Club domestic league appearances and goals

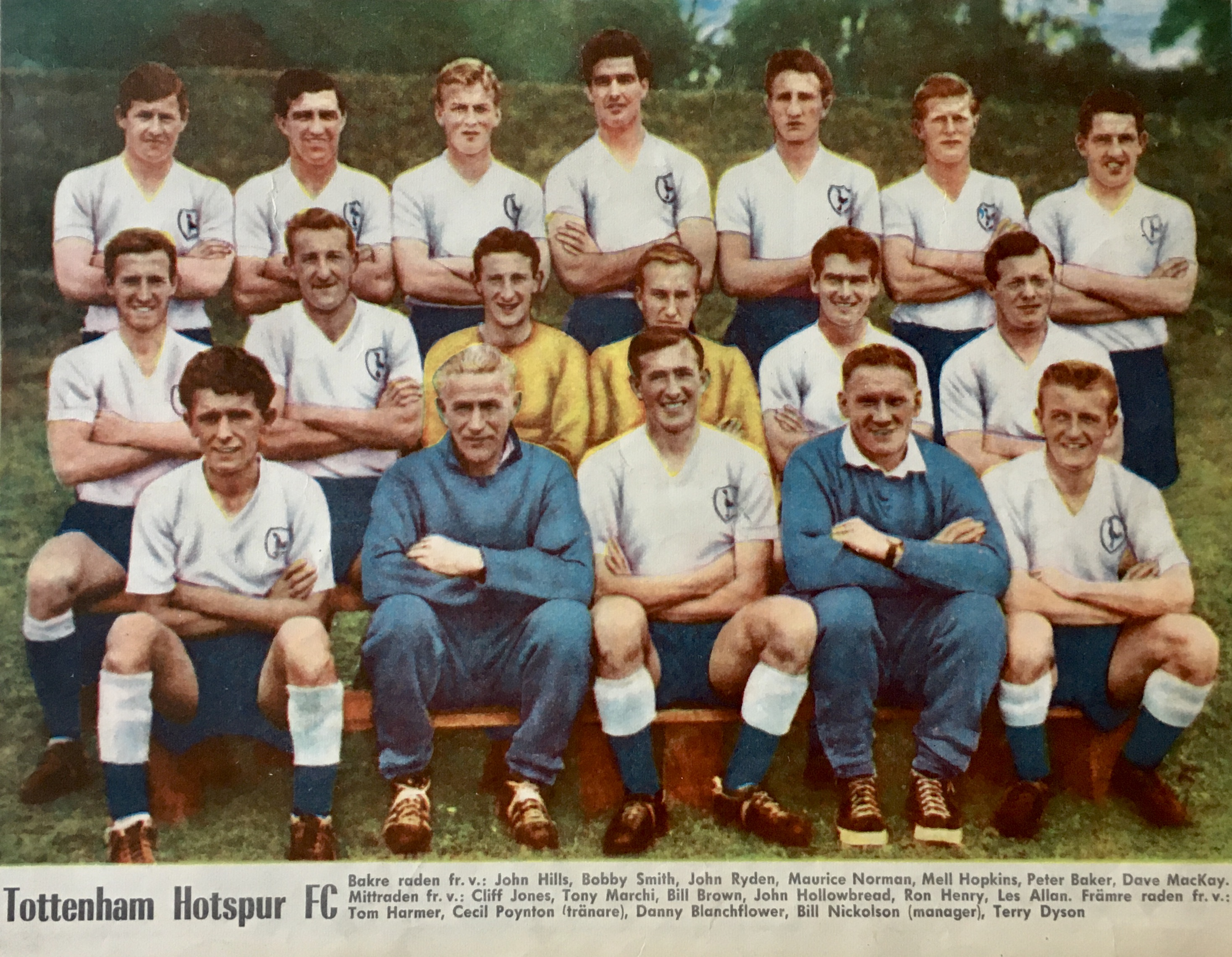
Tottenham Hotspur in 1960 with Danny Blanchflower (captain) and both goalkeepers, Bill Brown and John Hollowbread, in the team with Cecil Poynton as trainer and Bill Nicholson as manager. Bobby Smith is from left the second player standing.

Robert Alfred Smith (22 February 1933 – 18 September 2010) was an English footballer who played as a centre-forward for Chelsea, Tottenham Hotspur, Brighton and Hove Albion and England. He finished as the First Division's top scorer in the 1957–58 season and he is Tottenham Hotspur's third-highest goal scorer with 208 goals.

== Club career ==
Smith was born in Lingdale, North Riding of Yorkshire, and was spotted by Chelsea when playing for Redcar Boys' Club, where he had originally started out as a full back. He signed professional for the London club in 1950. He scored 23 League goals in 74 appearances, and seven FA Cup goals in twelve appearances. He was part of the 1954–55 Chelsea side that won the First Division, though he only made four appearances that season. Despite the fact he never really became established as a regular with Chelsea between 1950 and 1955, Tottenham Hotspur paid £18,000 for his transfer in December 1955.

Smith was an integral part of Bill Nicholson's famous double winning Tottenham team of 1960–61. He was Tottenham's top scorer in the double-winning season, with 33 goals scored in 43 games, including the first of the two goals in the 1961 FA Cup Final. The team also went on to retain the FA Cup in 1962 (scoring in the Final again) and win the 1963 UEFA Cup Winners' Cup. He is one of Spurs' all-time top goal scorers, third behind Harry Kane and Jimmy Greaves, with 208 goals scored in 317 senior matches, including 12 hat-tricks.

Smith played for Brighton & Hove Albion from 1964 to 1965, scoring 19 goals in 31 appearances.

== International career ==
Smith won 15 full international caps for the England national team which included two goals in the 9–3 defeat of Scotland at Wembley in 1961. He played for England from 1960 to 1963, scoring 13 goals.

== Post-playing career ==
Smith published a book in 2002 to celebrate his achievements, Memories of Spurs, with a foreword by Jimmy Greaves.

He died on 18 September 2010 following a short illness at a hospital in Enfield, London.

== Honours ==
Tottenham Hotspur

- Football League First Division: 1960–61
- FA Cup: 1960–61, 1961–62
- FA Charity Shield: 1961, 1962
- UEFA Cup Winners' Cup: 1962–63

Brighton & Hove Albion

- Football League Fourth Division: 1964–65
