= 1961–62 in English football =

Football in England
- Season: 1961–62

Men's football
- First Division: Ipswich Town
- Second Division: Liverpool
- Third Division: Portsmouth
- Fourth Division: Millwall
- FA Cup: Tottenham Hotspur
- Charity Shield: Tottenham Hotspur

The 1961–62 season was the 82nd season of competitive Football in England.

== Overview ==
Ipswich Town won the League Championship under manager Alf Ramsey, who had led the club from the old Third Division South to the First Division. Ipswich were dismissed by most of the media at the time as relegation candidates, but Ramsey's tactics baffled the big clubs in the division such as favourites Tottenham Hotspur and Burnley, and other big names such as Manchester United and Arsenal. Before Ramsey's tenure, Ipswich had never played in the top flight of English Football. Ramsey's triumph led him to being offered the job of the England football team manager, which he duly accepted in 1963; England won the World Cup three years later. Liverpool, managed by Bill Shankly, were promoted from the Second Division after eight years. Accrington Stanley resigned from the league because of financial difficulties on 11 March 1962. As a consequence, all their previous results for the season in the Fourth Division were expunged from the records. They were replaced in 1962–63 by Oxford United.

== Diary of the season ==
22 August 1961: Rotherham United beat Aston Villa 2–0 in the first leg of the first ever Football League Cup final. Fixture congestion has meant that last season's competition has stretched into this season.

11 September 1961: The floodlights at the City Ground are officially turned on for the first time as Nottingham Forest face Gillingham in the League Cup.

11 October 1961: Reports surface indicating Welsh internationalist John Charles of Juventus will soon be back in English football after joining the Bianconeri in 1957: the Italian club's vice-president told the press "[Charles] had already told me of his wish to return to England to look after his children's education".

18 November 1961: Table-topping Burnley drop their first points of the season by drawing 3–3 with Wolverhampton Wanderers. Elsewhere in the top-flight, Ipswich Town rack up a fifth win in a row by beating Manchester United 4–1, Tottenham Hotspur play out a goalless draw at Sheffield Wednesday, Birmingham City put four without reply past West Ham United, who slump into fifth, below both Ipswich and Spurs. In the rest of the Football League, Liverpool are seven points clear of Scunthorpe United at the top of the Second Division, South Coast clubs Bournemouth & Boscombe Athletic and Portsmouth lead Division Three, and Welsh club Wrexham, who have recorded 14 wins already this season, are top of the Fourth Division.

23 April 1962: Ipswich beat Arsenal 3–0 and Burnley are held by Blackburn Rovers in the East Lancashire derby, giving Town a two-point lead over Burnley at the top of Division One. In the race to evade joining already-relegated Chelsea in next season's second-tier, Cardiff City pick up a useful win against West Ham United, while fellow strugglers Fulham were beaten by West Bromwich Albion. Both Cardiff and Fulham are on 31 points, but the West Londoners have one game more left to play compared with the Bluebirds. In the Second Division, Leyton Orient's win over Luton Town ensures the East London club continue to chase Scunthorpe and Sunderland for the last remaining promotion spot.

28 April 1962: Ipswich, in the First Division for the first time, are crowned champions of English club football with a 2–0 win at home Aston Villa on the last day of the league season. It is the first major trophy of their history, and the first time that an English club has won the title in their first season as a top division club.

5 May 1962: Tottenham Hotspur retain the FA Cup with a 3–1 win over Burnley at Wembley Stadium with goals from Jimmy Greaves, Bobby Smith and Danny Blanchflower.

July 1962: Manchester United pay a British record fee of £115,000 for Scottish striker Denis Law from Torino of Italy.

== Awards ==
Football Writers' Association

- Footballer of the Year – Jimmy Adamson (Burnley)

Top goalscorer

- Ray Crawford (Ipswich Town) and Derek Kevan (West Bromwich Albion), 33

== Honours ==
Competition	Winner	Runner-up
First Division	Ipswich Town (1)	Burnley
Second Division	Liverpool	Leyton Orient
Third Division	Portsmouth	Grimsby Town
Fourth Division	Millwall	Colchester United
FA Cup	Tottenham Hotspur (4)	Burnley
League Cup	Norwich City (1)	Rochdale
Charity Shield	Tottenham Hotspur	Football Association XI
British Home Championship	Scotland	Wales

== Football League ==
=== First Division ===
Ipswich Town achieved a superb debut in the First Division as champions, finishing three points ahead of runners-up Burnley. Third placed Tottenham Hotspur were unable to retain their league title but at least managed to retain the FA Cup, while Everton and Sheffield United completed the top five.

Manchester United endured their worst postwar finish by finishing 15th despite the expensive signing of forward David Herd before the start of the season, which prompted Matt Busby to strengthen United's attack by bringing Denis Law back to England from Italy in British football's first six-figure transfer.

Chelsea, who had gradually lost touch with the First Division's leading pack since their 1955 title triumph, went down in bottom place, and were joined by Cardiff City in relegation.

Pos	Team	Pld	W	D	L	GF	GA	GAv	Pts	Qualification or relegation
1	Ipswich Town (C)	42	24	8	10	93	67	1.388	56	Qualification for the European Cup preliminary round
2	Burnley	42	21	11	10	101	67	1.507	53	
3	Tottenham Hotspur	42	21	10	11	88	69	1.275	52	Qualification for the European Cup Winners' Cup first round
4	Everton	42	20	11	11	88	54	1.630	51	Qualification for the Inter-Cities Fairs Cup first round
5	Sheffield United	42	19	9	14	61	69	0.884	47	
6	Sheffield Wednesday	42	20	6	16	72	58	1.241	46	
7	Aston Villa	42	18	8	16	65	56	1.161	44	
8	West Ham United	42	17	10	15	76	82	0.927	44	
9	West Bromwich Albion	42	15	13	14	83	67	1.239	43	
10	Arsenal	42	16	11	15	71	72	0.986	43	
11	Bolton Wanderers	42	16	10	16	62	66	0.939	42	
12	Manchester City	42	17	7	18	78	81	0.963	41	
13	Blackpool	42	15	11	16	70	75	0.933	41	
14	Leicester City	42	17	6	19	72	71	1.014	40	
15	Manchester United	42	15	9	18	72	75	0.960	39	
16	Blackburn Rovers	42	14	11	17	50	58	0.862	39	
17	Birmingham City	42	14	10	18	65	81	0.802	38	
18	Wolverhampton Wanderers	42	13	10	19	73	86	0.849	36	
19	Nottingham Forest	42	13	10	19	63	79	0.797	36	
20	Fulham	42	13	7	22	66	74	0.892	33	
21	Cardiff City (R)	42	9	14	19	50	81	0.617	32	Relegation to the Second Division
22	Chelsea (R)	42	9	10	23	63	94	0.670	28	Relegation to the Second Division

Source: World Football
Rules for classification: 1) Points; 2) Goal average; 3) Goals scored
(C) Champions; (R) Relegated

=== Second Division ===
Liverpool finally secured a First Division comeback as champions of the Second Division, with forward Roger Hunt being instrumental with 41 league goals. They were joined in promotion by a Leyton Orient side who had never appeared in the top flight before. Sunderland missed out on promotion by a single point, while Scunthorpe United (with just over a decade of league football behind them) emerged as surprise promotion contenders before having to settle for a fourth-place finish – still their best finish yet.

Norwich City had a disappointing season in the league after last season's promotion push, but compensated for this by winning the Football League Cup – the first major trophy of their history.

Brighton and Bristol Rovers went down.

Pos	Team	Pld	W	D	L	GF	GA	GAv	Pts	Qualification or relegation
1	Liverpool (C, P)	42	27	8	7	99	43	2.302	62	Promotion to the First Division
2	Leyton Orient (P)	42	22	10	10	69	40	1.725	54	Promotion to the First Division
3	Sunderland	42	22	9	11	85	50	1.700	53	
4	Scunthorpe United	42	21	7	14	86	71	1.211	49	
5	Plymouth Argyle	42	19	8	15	75	75	1.000	46	
6	Southampton	42	18	9	15	77	62	1.242	45	
7	Huddersfield Town	42	16	12	14	67	59	1.136	44	
8	Stoke City	42	17	8	17	55	57	0.965	42	
9	Rotherham United	42	16	9	17	70	76	0.921	41	
10	Preston North End	42	15	10	17	55	57	0.965	40	
11	Newcastle United	42	15	9	18	64	58	1.103	39	
12	Middlesbrough	42	16	7	19	76	72	1.056	39	
13	Luton Town	42	17	5	20	69	71	0.972	39	
14	Walsall	42	14	11	17	70	75	0.933	39	
15	Charlton Athletic	42	15	9	18	69	75	0.920	39	
16	Derby County	42	14	11	17	68	75	0.907	39	
17	Norwich City	42	14	11	17	61	70	0.871	39	
18	Bury	42	17	5	20	52	76	0.684	39	
19	Leeds United	42	12	12	18	50	61	0.820	36	
20	Swansea Town	42	12	12	18	61	83	0.735	36	
21	Bristol Rovers (R)	42	13	7	22	53	81	0.654	33	Relegation to the Third Division
22	Brighton & Hove Albion (R)	42	10	11	21	42	86	0.488	31	Relegation to the Third Division

Rules for classification: 1) Points; 2) Goal average; 3) Goals scored
(C) Champions; (P) Promoted; (R) Relegated

=== Third Division ===
Portsmouth achieved an instant return to the Second Division as champions of the Third Division. They were joined in promotion by Grimsby Town.

Newport County, Brentford, Lincoln City and Torquay United went down to the Fourth Division.

Pos	Team	Pld	W	D	L	GF	GA	GAv	Pts	Promotion or relegation
1	Portsmouth (C, P)	46	27	11	8	87	47	1.851	65	Promotion to the Second Division
2	Grimsby Town (P)	46	28	6	12	80	56	1.429	62	Promotion to the Second Division
3	Bournemouth & Boscombe Athletic	46	21	17	8	69	45	1.533	59	
4	Queens Park Rangers	46	24	11	11	111	73	1.521	59	
5	Peterborough United	46	26	6	14	107	82	1.305	58	
6	Bristol City	46	23	8	15	94	72	1.306	54	
7	Reading	46	22	9	15	77	66	1.167	53	
8	Northampton Town	46	20	11	15	85	57	1.491	51	
9	Swindon Town	46	17	15	14	78	71	1.099	49	
10	Hull City	46	20	8	18	67	54	1.241	48	
11	Bradford (Park Avenue)	46	20	7	19	80	78	1.026	47	
12	Port Vale	46	17	11	18	65	58	1.121	45	
13	Notts County	46	17	9	20	67	74	0.905	43	
14	Coventry City	46	16	11	19	64	71	0.901	43	
15	Crystal Palace	46	14	14	18	83	80	1.038	42	
16	Southend United	46	13	16	17	57	69	0.826	42	
17	Watford	46	14	13	19	63	74	0.851	41	
18	Halifax Town	46	15	10	21	62	84	0.738	40	
19	Shrewsbury Town	46	13	12	21	73	84	0.869	38	
20	Barnsley	46	13	12	21	71	95	0.747	38	
21	Torquay United (R)	46	15	6	25	76	100	0.760	36	Relegation to the Fourth Division
22	Lincoln City (R)	46	9	17	20	57	87	0.655	35	Relegation to the Fourth Division
23	Brentford (R)	46	13	8	25	53	93	0.570	34	Relegation to the Fourth Division
24	Newport County (R)	46	7	8	31	46	102	0.451	22	Relegation to the Fourth Division

(C) Champions; (P) Promoted; (R) Relegated

=== Fourth Division ===
Millwall clinched the Fourth Division title, and were joined in promotion by Colchester United, Wrexham and Carlisle United.

Accrington Stanley were forced to resign from the season several weeks before the end of the Fourth Division campaign, and their place in the Fourth Division went to Football League newcomers Oxford United.

Pos	Team	Pld	W	D	L	GF	GA	GAv	Pts	Promotion or relegation
1	Millwall (C, P)	44	23	10	11	87	62	1.403	56	Promotion to the Third Division
2	Colchester United (P)	44	23	9	12	104	71	1.465	55	Promotion to the Third Division
3	Wrexham (P)	44	22	9	13	96	56	1.714	53	Promotion to the Third Division
4	Carlisle United (P)	44	22	8	14	64	63	1.016	52	Promotion to the Third Division
5	Bradford City	44	21	9	14	94	86	1.093	51	
6	York City	44	20	10	14	84	53	1.585	50	
7	Aldershot	44	22	5	17	81	60	1.350	49	
8	Workington	44	19	11	14	69	70	0.986	49	
9	Barrow	44	17	14	13	74	58	1.276	48	
10	Crewe Alexandra	44	20	6	18	79	70	1.129	46	
11	Oldham Athletic	44	17	12	15	77	70	1.100	46	
12	Rochdale	44	19	7	18	71	71	1.000	45	
13	Darlington	44	18	9	17	61	73	0.836	45	
14	Mansfield Town	44	19	6	19	77	66	1.167	44	
15	Tranmere Rovers	44	20	4	20	70	81	0.864	44	
16	Stockport County	44	17	9	18	70	69	1.014	43	
17	Southport	44	17	9	18	61	71	0.859	43	
18	Exeter City	44	13	11	20	62	77	0.805	37	
19	Chesterfield	44	14	9	21	70	87	0.805	37	
20	Gillingham	44	13	11	20	73	94	0.777	37	
21	Doncaster Rovers	44	11	7	26	60	85	0.706	29	Re-elected
22	Hartlepools United	44	8	11	25	52	101	0.515	27	Re-elected
23	Chester	44	7	12	25	54	96	0.563	26	Re-elected
24	Accrington Stanley	0	0	0	0	0	0	—	0	Resigned from the league, club folded years later (Note: Accrington Stanley resigned from the Football League on 11 March. Their record (P33 W5 D8 L20 GF19 GA60 GR 0.317 Pts 18) was expunged.)

Source: rsssf.com
(C) Champions; (P) Promoted

=== Top goalscorers ===
First Division

- Ray Crawford (Ipswich Town) and Derek Kevan (West Bromwich Albion) – 33 goals

Second Division

- Roger Hunt (Liverpool) – 41 goals

Third Division

- Cliff Holton (Watford and Northampton Town) – 37 goals

Fourth Division

- Bobby Hunt (Colchester United) – 37 goals
