= Ken Barton =

Welsh footballer (1937–1982)

Personal information
- Full name: Kenneth Rees Barton
- Date of birth: 20 September 1937
- Place of birth: Caernarfon, Wales
- Date of death: 6 September 1982 (aged 44)
- Place of death: Chester, England
- Position: Full back

Youth career
- 1956–1960: Tottenham Hotspur

Senior career*
Years	Team	Apps	(Gls)
1960–1964	Tottenham Hotspur	4	(0)
1964–1965	Millwall	0	(0)
1964–1965	Luton Town	11	(0)
	Dunstable Town	?	(?)
- * Club domestic league appearances and goals

Kenneth Rees Barton (20 September 1937 – 6 September 1982) was a Welsh professional footballer who played for Tottenham Hotspur, Millwall, Luton Town and Wales Schools in the position of full back. He was born in Caernarfon.

== Football career ==
Barton joined Spurs as a junior in October 1956 and made his first class debut in 1960. Playing a total of four times, he was one of seventeen players used in their Double winning season of 1960–61. Leaving the club in a transfer deal in September 1964 to join Millwall. He transferred to Luton Town where he made 11 appearances in 1964. Barton ended his career at Dunstable Town F.C.

== See also ==
- Tottenham Hotspur F.C. season 1960–61
