= Malton School =

Location
- Middlecave Road; Malton, North Yorkshire, YO17 7NH; England
- Coordinates: 54.1392°N 0.8115°W

Information
- Type: Community school
- Motto: Unitate Fortiores (Stronger for Being One)
- Established: 1547; 479 years ago
- Founder: Robert Holgate, Archbishop of York
- Local authority: North Yorkshire Council
- Department for Education URN: 121681 Tables
- Ofsted: Reports
- Head teacher: Rob Williams
- Age: 11 to 18
- Enrolment: 1,100
- Houses: Carlisle, Holgate, Fitzwilliam, Willoughby and Tudor
- Colours: Yellow, Red, Blue, Green and Silver
- Website: http://www.maltonschool.org/

Malton School is an 11–18 co-educational comprehensive school of 1,100 pupils (2024), serving the market town of Malton and the surrounding area in North Yorkshire, England.

== History ==
Malton School has a history dating back to the end of the reign of Henry VIII. Its foundation document still exists, held in the archives of the Borthwick Institute for Archives in York.

Malton Grammar School was one of three grammar schools founded in 1547 by the Archbishop of York, Robert Holgate – the other two were Archbishop Holgate's School in York, and Holgate School, in Barnsley. It existed in Old Malton until 1904, when it closed temporarily, reopening in new buildings on Middlecave Road in 1911 as a mixed Grammar School. These 1911 buildings were designed by architect Walter Brierley, and are still in use, now referred to as the East Wing of the current school. The first headteacher was Ernest Loraine Watt, who was head until 1938, when Thomas Arthur Williams took over following the death of Watt. The third head was Philip Taylor, from 1951 to 1971.

Malton County Modern School was built on land adjacent to the grammar school in 1959. George Hanson was its only Headteacher during its 12-year existence.

The County Modern and Grammar School merged in 1971 to become Malton School, a comprehensive school. Philip Taylor was nominated as Head, but died within a few weeks of the school opening. John Gresswell, who had been appointed as deputy for the school's opening, became head, from 1971 to 1989. The fifth headteacher was David Roberts, whose time in office ran from 1989 to 2006. He was succeeded by the current head, Robert Williams.

The school was awarded specialist science status in 2004, with four new science laboratories built as part of the status. A £2.4 million community sports hall was opened on the school site by the Archbishop of York, John Sentamu, in February 2011. Usage is shared between the school during the day and the community in the evening.

In May 2011 the school's governing body proposed to convert to an academy – and subsequently to pursue conversion to a faith based school, re-establishing a link with the Church of England broken in 1911.

The school received a good rating in its 2023 Ofsted Inspection report.

== Notable former pupils ==
- Eric Robson – historian; at the school 1929–36. Graduated with 1st class honours from Manchester University.
- Terry Dyson (b.1934) – footballer; joined Tottenham Hotspur in 1955, and played for Spurs until 1965. He was a regular member of The Double winning side of 1960–61, and scored in the 1961 FA Cup Final against Leicester.
- Vic Wilson(17 January 1921 – 5 June 2008) – cricketer. Yorkshire captain 1960–62, winning the championship twice (1960 and 1962).
- Emma Duggleby (b.1971) – English amateur golfer. British women's open amateur title 1994; European individual title (2000); the South African open match-play championship (2002); the English amateur championship twice (2000 & 2003); and English Order of Merit (2003).
- James Martin (b.1972) – celebrity TV chef.
- Simon Dyson (b.1977) – English professional golfer
