= Cecil Poynton =

English footballer

Personal information
- Full name: Cecil Poynton
- Date of birth: 10 August 1901
- Place of birth: Brownhills, England
- Date of death: 12 January 1983 (aged 81)
- Place of death: Tottenham, England
- Height: 5 ft 10 in (1.78 m)
- Position: Left back

Senior career*
Years	Team	Apps	(Gls)
1923–1932	Tottenham Hotspur	152	(3)
1934–?	Ramsgate	?	(?)
- * Club domestic league appearances and goals

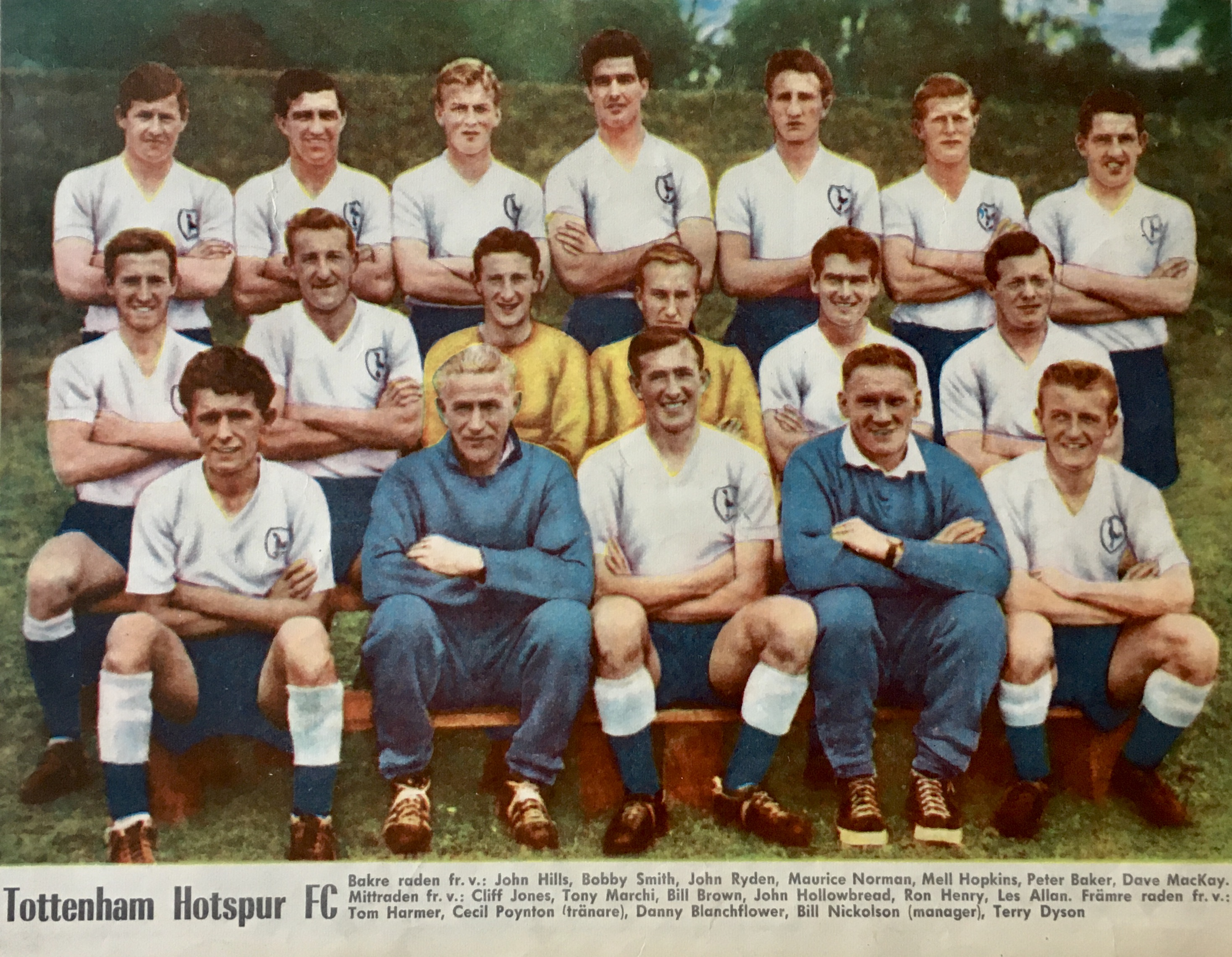
Tottenham Hotspur in 1960 with Danny Blanchflower (captain) and both goalkeepers, Bill Brown and John Hollowbread, in the team with Bill Nicholson as manager and Cecil Poynton as trainer.

Cecil Poynton (10 August 1901 – 12 January 1983) was a professional footballer who played for Tottenham Hotspur and Ramsgate.

== Football career ==
He joined the Spurs in August 1922 after being spotted playing for Welsh club Ton Pentre. Poynton a popular, loyal servant spent over half a century at the White Hart Lane club in various capacities including ten years as a player. The left back made his debut versus Birmingham City in December, 1923. In a career hampered by injuries, Poynton made a total of 158 appearances and scored three goals for the Lilywhites in all competitions . He became the first Tottenham player to be sent off in a match against Stoke City before taking up the position of player coach of the reserve side in 1933–34. Poynton had two spells at Ramsgate as player manager. In 1945 he was offered the role of the 1st team assistant trainer with the Spurs and was promoted to club trainer in 1947, a position he kept till 1972 before becoming the club's physiotherapist.

Poynton died at St Ann's Hospital, Tottenham in January, 1983.
