= 1960–61 in English football =

Football in England
- Season: 1960–61

Men's football
- First Division: Tottenham Hotspur
- Second Division: Ipswich Town
- Third Division: Bury
- Fourth Division: Peterborough United
- FA Cup: Tottenham Hotspur
- Football League Cup: Aston Villa

The 1960–61 season was the 81st season of competitive football in England. Tottenham Hotspur became the first club in the twentieth century to "do the Double" by winning both the League and the FA Cup competitions in the same season. Spurs sealed the First Division title with a 2–1 home win over Sheffield Wednesday on 17 April 1961. Preston North End, who had been the first team to achieve the League and FA Cup "double", was relegated in last place – and to date have not returned to the top flight of English football. 1960–61 still remains the last time Tottenham Hotspur won the League Championship. This season also saw the first contesting of the Football League Cup.

Portsmouth became the first former English League champion to be relegated to the Third Division, ten years after winning their second title. Peterborough United set a Football League record by scoring the most league goals (134) in a season.

== FA Cup ==
Tottenham Hotspur beat Leicester City 2–0 to win the 1961 FA Cup Final at Wembley Stadium to become the first team in the 20th Century to win the double.

== League Cup ==
The 1960–61 season was the inaugural staging of the Football League Cup, The tournament was won by Aston Villa, who beat Rotherham United 3–2 on aggregate after extra time. Although Aston Villa are credited as the League Cup Winners in 1960–61, both legs of the Final were held over until after the commencement of the 1961–62 season due to fixture congestion. Villa finally lifted the trophy on 5 September 1961.

== Transfers ==
In June 1961, Denis Law left Manchester City for Italian side Torino in a £100,000 deal – a record fee involving a British player.

== Honours ==
Competition	Winner	Runner-up
First Division	Tottenham Hotspur (2)	Sheffield Wednesday
Second Division	Ipswich Town	Sheffield United
Third Division	Bury	Walsall
Fourth Division	Peterborough United	Crystal Palace
FA Cup	Tottenham Hotspur (3)	Leicester City
League Cup	Aston Villa (1)	Rotherham United
Charity Shield	Burnley and Wolverhampton Wanderers (shared)	
Home Championship	England	Wales

Notes = Number in parentheses is the times that club has won that honour. * indicates new record for competition

== Awards ==
Football Writers' Association

- Footballer of the Year – Danny Blanchflower (Tottenham Hotspur)

== Football League ==
=== First Division ===
Tottenham Hotspur became the first team in the 20th century to win the double, finishing eight points ahead of runners-up Sheffield Wednesday. Wolves, Everton and defending champions Burnley completed the top five, while FA Cup runners-up Leicester City were in sixth place and Manchester United finished seventh for the second season running.

Preston North End, in their first season without retired winger Tom Finney, went down in bottom place, joined in relegation by Newcastle United.

Pos	Team	Pld	W	D	L	GF	GA	GAv	Pts	Qualification or relegation
1	Tottenham Hotspur (C)	42	31	4	7	115	55	2.091	66	Qualification for the European Cup preliminary round
2	Sheffield Wednesday	42	23	12	7	78	47	1.660	58	Qualification for the Inter-Cities Fairs Cup first round
3	Wolverhampton Wanderers	42	25	7	10	103	75	1.373	57	
4	Burnley	42	22	7	13	102	77	1.325	51	
5	Everton	42	22	6	14	87	69	1.261	50	
6	Leicester City	42	18	9	15	87	70	1.243	45	Qualification for the European Cup Winners' Cup preliminary round (Note: Leicester City qualified for the Cup Winners' Cup preliminary round as the 1960–61 FA Cup runners-up, since the winners, Tottenham Hotspur, had already qualified for the European Cup.)
7	Manchester United	42	18	9	15	88	76	1.158	45	
8	Blackburn Rovers	42	15	13	14	77	76	1.013	43	
9	Aston Villa	42	17	9	16	78	77	1.013	43	
10	West Bromwich Albion	42	18	5	19	67	71	0.944	41	
11	Arsenal	42	15	11	16	77	85	0.906	41	
12	Chelsea	42	15	7	20	98	100	0.980	37	
13	Manchester City	42	13	11	18	79	90	0.878	37	
14	Nottingham Forest	42	14	9	19	62	78	0.795	37	Qualification for the Inter-Cities Fairs Cup first round
15	Cardiff City	42	13	11	18	60	85	0.706	37	
16	West Ham United	42	13	10	19	77	88	0.875	36	
17	Fulham	42	14	8	20	72	95	0.758	36	
18	Bolton Wanderers	42	12	11	19	58	73	0.795	35	
19	Birmingham City	42	14	6	22	62	84	0.738	34	Qualification for the Inter-Cities Fairs Cup second round
20	Blackpool	42	12	9	21	68	73	0.932	33	
21	Newcastle United (R)	42	11	10	21	86	109	0.789	32	Relegation to the Second Division
22	Preston North End (R)	42	10	10	22	43	71	0.606	30	Relegation to the Second Division

Source: World Football
Rules for classification: 1) Points; 2) Goal average; 3) Goals scored
(C) Champions; (R) Relegated

=== Second Division ===
Alf Ramsey's Ipswich side reached the First Division for the first time in their history by winning the Second Division title. The club had been in non-league football 25 years earlier. They were joined in promotion by Sheffield United. Liverpool just missed out on First Division football once again, while Norwich City achieved their best final position yet by finishing fourth.

Lincoln City went down in bottom place and were joined in the Third Division by Portsmouth, league champions just over a decade earlier.

Pos	Team	Pld	W	D	L	GF	GA	GAv	Pts	Qualification or relegation
1	Ipswich Town (C, P)	42	26	7	9	100	55	1.818	59	Promotion to the First Division
2	Sheffield United (P)	42	26	6	10	81	51	1.588	58	Promotion to the First Division
3	Liverpool	42	21	10	11	87	58	1.500	52	
4	Norwich City	42	20	9	13	70	53	1.321	49	
5	Middlesbrough	42	18	12	12	83	74	1.122	48	
6	Sunderland	42	17	13	12	75	60	1.250	47	
7	Swansea Town	42	18	11	13	77	73	1.055	47	Qualification for the European Cup Winners' Cup preliminary round
8	Southampton	42	18	8	16	84	81	1.037	44	
9	Scunthorpe United	42	14	15	13	69	64	1.078	43	
10	Charlton Athletic	42	16	11	15	97	91	1.066	43	
11	Plymouth Argyle	42	17	8	17	81	82	0.988	42	
12	Derby County	42	15	10	17	80	80	1.000	40	
13	Luton Town	42	15	9	18	71	79	0.899	39	
14	Leeds United	42	14	10	18	75	83	0.904	38	
15	Rotherham United	42	12	13	17	65	64	1.016	37	
16	Brighton & Hove Albion	42	14	9	19	61	75	0.813	37	
17	Bristol Rovers	42	15	7	20	73	92	0.793	37	
18	Stoke City	42	12	12	18	51	59	0.864	36	
19	Leyton Orient	42	14	8	20	55	78	0.705	36	
20	Huddersfield Town	42	13	9	20	62	71	0.873	35	
21	Portsmouth (R)	42	11	11	20	64	91	0.703	33	Relegation to the Third Division
22	Lincoln City (R)	42	8	8	26	48	95	0.505	24	Relegation to the Third Division

Rules for classification: 1) Points; 2) Goal average; 3) Goals scored
(C) Champions; (P) Promoted; (R) Relegated

=== Third Division ===
Bury won promotion to the Second Division as champions of the Third Division and were joined in the higher division by runners-up Walsall.

Chesterfield, Colchester United and Tranmere Rovers, who had all spent most or all of their history in nothing higher than the league's third tier, went down to the Fourth Division, but were relegated along with a Bradford City side who had played in the First Division for a number of seasons until 1922 and were FA Cup winners in 1911.

Pos	Team	Pld	W	D	L	GF	GA	GAv	Pts	Promotion or relegation
1	Bury (C, P)	46	30	8	8	108	45	2.400	68	Promotion to the Second Division
2	Walsall (P)	46	28	6	12	98	60	1.633	62	Promotion to the Second Division
3	Queens Park Rangers	46	25	10	11	93	60	1.550	60	
4	Watford	46	20	12	14	85	72	1.181	52	
5	Notts County	46	21	9	16	82	77	1.065	51	
6	Grimsby Town	46	20	10	16	77	69	1.116	50	
7	Port Vale	46	17	15	14	96	79	1.215	49	
8	Barnsley	46	21	7	18	83	80	1.038	49	
9	Halifax Town	46	16	17	13	71	78	0.910	49	
10	Shrewsbury Town	46	15	16	15	83	75	1.107	46	
11	Hull City	46	17	12	17	73	73	1.000	46	
12	Torquay United	46	14	17	15	75	83	0.904	45	
13	Newport County	46	17	11	18	81	90	0.900	45	
14	Bristol City	46	17	10	19	70	68	1.029	44	
15	Coventry City	46	16	12	18	80	83	0.964	44	
16	Swindon Town	46	14	15	17	62	55	1.127	43	
17	Brentford	46	13	17	16	56	70	0.800	43	
18	Reading	46	14	12	20	72	83	0.867	40	
19	Bournemouth & Boscombe Athletic	46	15	10	21	58	76	0.763	40	
20	Southend United	46	14	11	21	60	76	0.789	39	
21	Tranmere Rovers (R)	46	15	8	23	79	115	0.687	38	Relegation to the Fourth Division
22	Bradford City (R)	46	11	14	21	65	87	0.747	36	Relegation to the Fourth Division
23	Colchester United (R)	46	11	11	24	68	101	0.673	33	Relegation to the Fourth Division
24	Chesterfield (R)	46	10	12	24	67	87	0.770	32	Relegation to the Fourth Division

(C) Champions; (P) Promoted; (R) Relegated

=== Fourth Division ===
Peterborough United enjoyed a blistering debut in the Football League, finding the net 134 times (with 52 goals coming from centre-forward Terry Bly) and clinching the Fourth Division title. They were joined in promotion by Crystal Palace, Northampton Town and Bradford Park Avenue.

Pos	Team	Pld	W	D	L	GF	GA	GAv	Pts	Promotion or relegation
1	Peterborough United (C, P)	46	28	10	8	134	65	2.062	66	Promotion to the Third Division
2	Crystal Palace (P)	46	29	6	11	110	69	1.594	64	Promotion to the Third Division
3	Northampton Town (P)	46	25	10	11	90	62	1.452	60	Promotion to the Third Division
4	Bradford (Park Avenue) (P)	46	26	8	12	84	74	1.135	60	Promotion to the Third Division
5	York City	46	21	9	16	80	60	1.333	51	
6	Millwall	46	21	8	17	97	86	1.128	50	
7	Darlington	46	18	13	15	78	70	1.114	49	
8	Workington	46	21	7	18	74	76	0.974	49	
9	Crewe Alexandra	46	20	9	17	61	67	0.910	49	
10	Aldershot	46	18	9	19	79	69	1.145	45	
11	Doncaster Rovers	46	19	7	20	76	78	0.974	45	
12	Oldham Athletic	46	19	7	20	79	88	0.898	45	
13	Stockport County	46	18	9	19	57	66	0.864	45	
14	Southport	46	19	6	21	69	67	1.030	44	
15	Gillingham	46	15	13	18	64	66	0.970	43	
16	Wrexham	46	17	8	21	62	56	1.107	42	
17	Rochdale	46	17	8	21	60	66	0.909	42	
18	Accrington Stanley	46	16	8	22	74	88	0.841	40	
19	Carlisle United	46	13	13	20	61	79	0.772	39	
20	Mansfield Town	46	16	6	24	71	78	0.910	38	
21	Exeter City	46	14	10	22	66	94	0.702	38	Re-elected
22	Barrow	46	13	11	22	52	79	0.658	37	Re-elected
23	Hartlepools United	46	12	8	26	71	103	0.689	32	Re-elected
24	Chester	46	11	9	26	61	104	0.587	31	Re-elected

Source: rsssf.com
(C) Champions; (P) Promoted

=== Top goalscorers ===
First Division

- Jimmy Greaves (Chelsea) – 41 goals

Second Division

- Ray Crawford (Ipswich Town) – 39 goals

Third Division

- Tony Richards (Walsall) – 36 goals

Fourth Division

- Terry Bly (Peterborough United) – 52 goals
