= 1960–61 Football League First Division =

1960–61 season of Football League First Division

First Division
- Season: 1960–61
- Champions: Tottenham Hotspur; 2nd English title
- Relegated: Newcastle United; Preston North End
- European Cup: Tottenham Hotspur
- Cup Winners' Cup: Leicester City
- Inter-Cities Fairs Cup: Sheffield Wednesday; Nottingham Forest; Birmingham City
- Matches: 462
- Goals: 1,724 (3.73 per match)
- Top goalscorer: Jimmy Greaves (41 goals)

Statistics of Football League First Division in the 1960–61 season.

== Overview ==
Tottenham Hotspur won the First Division title for the second time in the club's history, eight points clear of second-placed Sheffield Wednesday. This remains their last league title.

Newcastle United and Preston North End were relegated, to be replaced by Ipswich Town and Sheffield United who finished first and second in the Second Division that season. Notably, this remains Preston's most recent season in the top flight.

== League standings ==
Pos	Team	Pld	W	D	L	GF	GA	GAv	Pts	Qualification or relegation
1	Tottenham Hotspur (C)	42	31	4	7	115	55	2.091	66	Qualification for the European Cup preliminary round
2	Sheffield Wednesday	42	23	12	7	78	47	1.660	58	Qualification for the Inter-Cities Fairs Cup first round
3	Wolverhampton Wanderers	42	25	7	10	103	75	1.373	57	
4	Burnley	42	22	7	13	102	77	1.325	51	
5	Everton	42	22	6	14	87	69	1.261	50	
6	Leicester City	42	18	9	15	87	70	1.243	45	Qualification for the European Cup Winners' Cup preliminary round (Note: Leicester City qualified for the Cup Winners' Cup preliminary round as the 1960–61 FA Cup runners-up, since the winners, Tottenham Hotspur, had already qualified for the European Cup.)
7	Manchester United	42	18	9	15	88	76	1.158	45	
8	Blackburn Rovers	42	15	13	14	77	76	1.013	43	
9	Aston Villa	42	17	9	16	78	77	1.013	43	
10	West Bromwich Albion	42	18	5	19	67	71	0.944	41	
11	Arsenal	42	15	11	16	77	85	0.906	41	
12	Chelsea	42	15	7	20	98	100	0.980	37	
13	Manchester City	42	13	11	18	79	90	0.878	37	
14	Nottingham Forest	42	14	9	19	62	78	0.795	37	Qualification for the Inter-Cities Fairs Cup first round
15	Cardiff City	42	13	11	18	60	85	0.706	37	
16	West Ham United	42	13	10	19	77	88	0.875	36	
17	Fulham	42	14	8	20	72	95	0.758	36	
18	Bolton Wanderers	42	12	11	19	58	73	0.795	35	
19	Birmingham City	42	14	6	22	62	84	0.738	34	Qualification for the Inter-Cities Fairs Cup second round
20	Blackpool	42	12	9	21	68	73	0.932	33	
21	Newcastle United (R)	42	11	10	21	86	109	0.789	32	Relegation to the Second Division
22	Preston North End (R)	42	10	10	22	43	71	0.606	30	Relegation to the Second Division

Source: World Football
Rules for classification: 1) Points; 2) Goal average; 3) Goals scored
(C) Champions; (R) Relegated

== Results ==
Home \ Away	ARS	AST	BIR	BLB	BLP	BOL	BUR	CAR	CHE	EVE	FUL	LEI	MCI	MUN	NEW	NOT	PNE	SHW	TOT	WBA	WHU	WOL
Arsenal		2–1	2–0	0–0	1–0	5–1	2–5	2–3	1–4	3–2	4–2	1–3	5–4	2–1	5–0	3–0	1–0	1–1	2–3	1–0	0–0	1–5
Aston Villa	2–2		6–2	2–2	2–2	4–0	2–0	2–1	3–2	3–2	2–1	1–3	5–1	3–1	2–0	1–2	1–0	4–1	1–2	0–1	2–1	0–2
Birmingham City	2–0	1–1		1–1	0–2	2–2	0–1	2–1	1–0	2–4	1–0	0–2	3–2	3–1	2–1	3–1	1–3	1–1	2–3	3–1	4–2	1–2
Blackburn Rovers	2–4	4–1	2–0		2–0	3–1	1–4	2–2	3–1	1–3	5–1	1–1	4–1	1–2	2–4	4–1	1–0	1–1	1–4	2–1	4–1	2–1
Blackpool	1–1	5–3	1–2	2–0		0–1	0–0	6–1	1–4	1–4	2–5	5–1	3–3	2–0	2–1	4–0	0–1	0–1	1–3	0–1	3–0	5–2
Bolton Wanderers	1–1	3–0	2–2	0–0	3–1		3–5	3–0	4–1	3–4	0–3	2–0	3–1	1–1	2–1	3–1	1–1	0–1	1–2	0–1	3–1	0–2
Burnley	3–2	1–1	2–1	1–1	1–2	2–0		1–2	4–4	1–3	5–0	3–2	1–3	5–3	5–3	4–1	5–0	3–4	4–2	0–1	2–2	5–3
Cardiff City	1–0	1–1	0–2	1–1	0–2	0–1	2–1		2–1	1–1	2–0	2–1	3–3	3–0	3–2	1–3	2–0	0–1	3–2	3–1	1–1	3–2
Chelsea	3–1	2–4	3–2	5–2	2–2	1–1	2–6	6–1		3–3	2–1	1–3	6–3	1–2	4–2	4–3	1–1	0–2	2–3	7–1	3–2	3–3
Everton	4–1	1–2	1–0	2–2	1–0	1–2	0–3	5–1	1–1		1–0	3–1	4–2	4–0	5–0	1–0	0–0	4–2	1–3	1–1	4–1	3–1
Fulham	2–2	1–1	2–1	1–1	4–3	2–2	0–1	2–2	3–2	2–3		4–2	1–0	4–4	4–3	1–0	2–0	1–6	0–0	1–2	1–1	1–3
Leicester City	2–1	3–1	3–2	2–4	1–1	2–0	2–2	3–0	1–3	4–1	1–2		1–2	6–0	5–3	1–1	5–2	2–1	1–2	2–2	5–1	2–0
Manchester City	0–0	4–1	2–1	4–0	1–1	0–0	2–1	4–2	2–1	2–1	3–2	3–1		1–3	3–3	1–2	2–3	1–1	0–1	3–0	1–2	2–4
Manchester United	1–1	1–1	4–1	1–3	2–0	3–1	6–0	3–3	6–0	4–0	3–1	1–1	5–1		3–2	2–1	1–0	0–0	2–0	3–0	6–1	1–3
Newcastle United	3–3	2–1	2–2	3–1	4–3	4–1	0–1	5–0	1–6	0–4	7–2	1–3	1–3	1–1		2–2	0–0	0–1	3–4	3–2	5–5	4–4
Nottingham Forest	3–5	2–0	1–0	1–1	0–0	2–2	3–1	2–1	2–1	1–2	4–2	2–2	2–2	3–2	0–2		2–0	1–2	0–4	1–2	1–1	1–1
Preston North End	2–0	1–1	2–3	2–0	1–0	0–0	2–3	1–1	0–2	1–0	2–0	0–0	1–1	2–4	2–3	0–1		2–2	0–1	2–1	4–0	1–2
Sheffield Wednesday	1–1	1–2	2–0	5–4	4–0	2–0	3–1	2–0	1–0	1–2	2–0	2–2	3–1	5–1	1–1	1–0	5–1		2–1	1–0	1–0	0–0
Tottenham Hotspur	4–2	6–2	6–0	5–2	3–1	3–1	4–4	3–2	4–2	2–0	5–1	2–3	1–1	4–1	1–2	1–0	5–0	2–1		1–2	2–0	1–1
West Bromwich Albion	2–3	0–2	1–2	1–2	3–1	3–2	0–2	1–1	3–0	3–0	2–4	1–0	6–3	1–1	6–0	1–2	3–1	2–2	1–3		1–0	2–1
West Ham United	6–0	5–2	4–3	3–2	3–3	2–1	1–2	2–0	3–1	4–0	1–2	1–0	1–1	2–1	1–1	2–4	5–2	1–1	0–3	1–2		5–0
Wolverhampton Wanderers	5–3	3–2	5–1	0–0	1–0	3–1	2–1	2–2	6–1	4–1	2–4	3–2	1–0	2–1	2–1	5–3	3–0	4–1	0–4	4–2	4–2	

Updated to match(es) played on unknown. Source: Ian Laschke: Rothmans Book of Football League Records 1888–89 to 1978–79. Macdonald and Jane’s, London & Sydney, 1980.
Legend: Blue = home team win; Yellow = draw; Red = away team win.

== Top scorers ==
Rank	Player	Club	Goals
1	Jimmy Greaves	Chelsea	41
2	David Herd	Arsenal	29
=	Gerry Hitchens	Aston Villa	29
3	Bobby Smith	Tottenham Hotspur	28
=	Len White	Newcastle United	28
=	Ted Farmer	Wolverhampton Wanderers	28
4	Ray Charnley	Blackpool	27
5	Jimmy Robson	Burnley	24
