= Bill Nicholson (footballer) =

English footballer & manager (1919–2004)

Bill Nicholson OBE
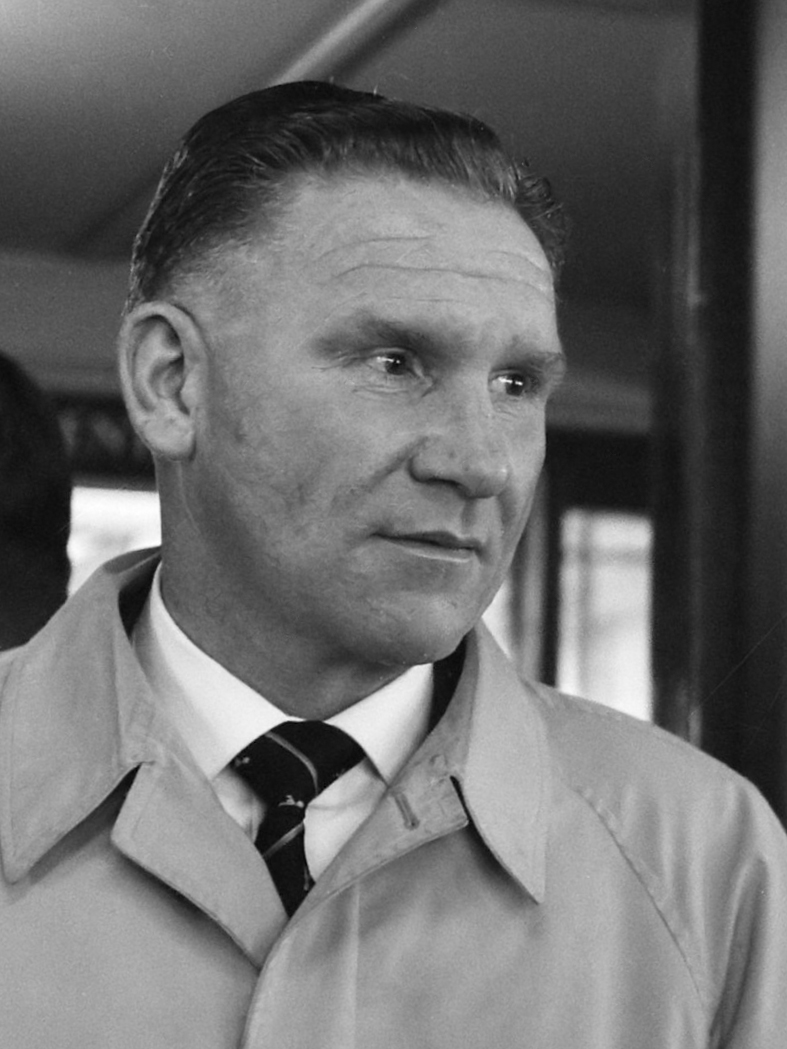
- Bill Nicholson in 1961

Personal information
- Full name: William Edward Nicholson
- Date of birth: 26 January 1919
- Place of birth: Scarborough, North Riding of Yorkshire, England
- Date of death: 23 October 2004 (aged 85)
- Place of death: Hertfordshire, England
- Position: Wing-half

Youth career
- Young Liberals
- Scarborough Working Men's Club
- 1936–1938: Tottenham Hotspur

Senior career*
Years	Team	Apps	(Gls)
1938	Northfleet United		
1938–1955	Tottenham Hotspur	314	(6)

International career
1951	England	1	(1)

Managerial career
- 1958–1974: Tottenham Hotspur
- * Club domestic league appearances and goals

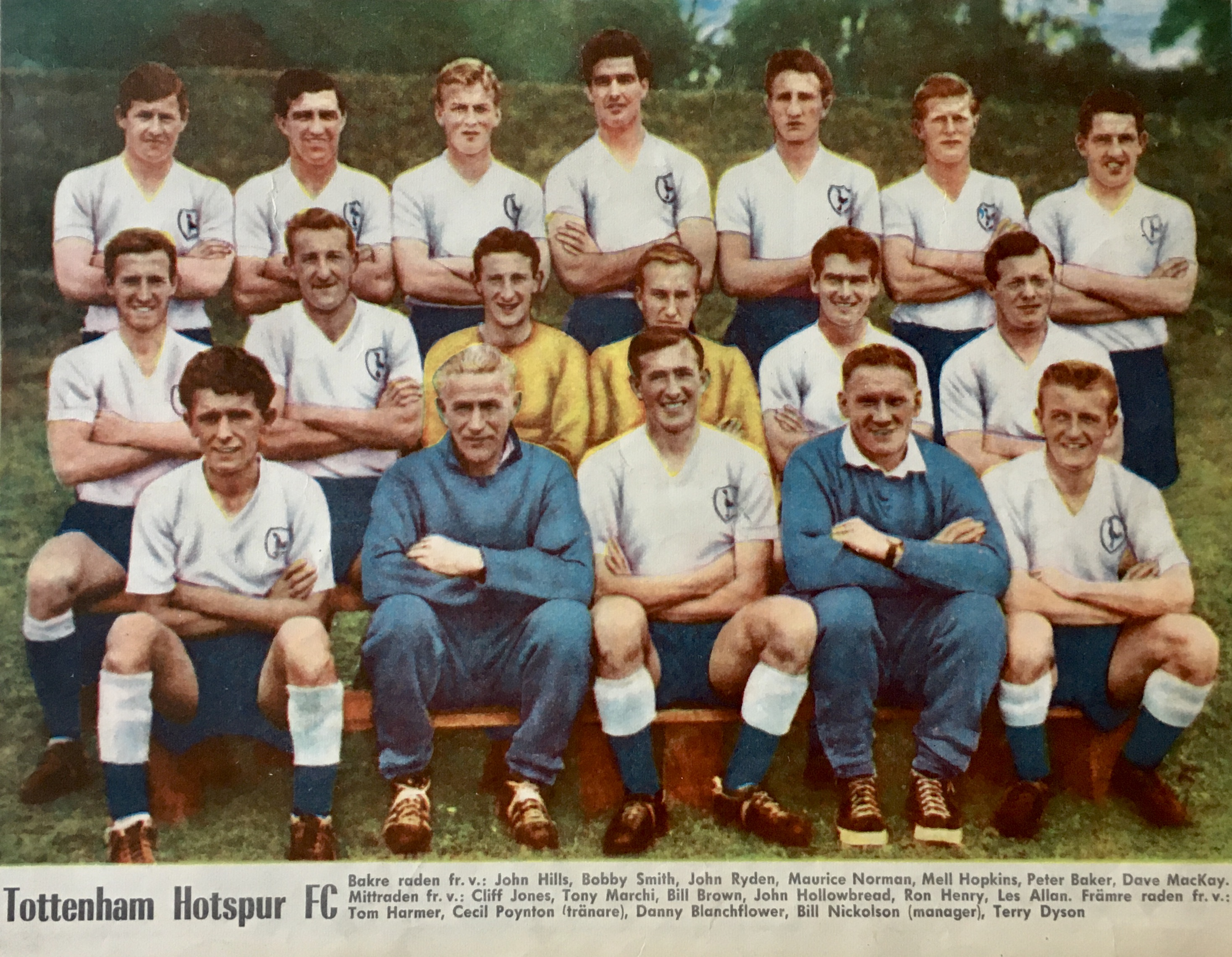
Tottenham Hotspur in 1960 with Bill Brown, John Hollowbread and Danny Blanchflower in the team with Bill Nicholson as manager.

William Edward Nicholson OBE (26 January 1919 – 23 October 2004) was an English football player, coach, manager and scout who had a 55-year association with Tottenham Hotspur. He is considered one of the most important figures in the club's history, winning eight major trophies in his 16-year managerial spell, and most notably guiding the team to their Double-winning season of 1960–61.

== Early life ==
Born in Scarborough, North Riding of Yorkshire, the eighth of nine children, Nicholson was a pupil at the town's Gladstone Road Junior School before attending Scarborough High School for Boys. He worked briefly in a laundry after leaving school, but at the age of 17 he was invited to a trial at Tottenham Hotspur, where he arrived on 16 March 1936 after playing for Young Liberals and Scarborough Working Men's Club in his youth. After a month's trial, he was taken on as a ground-staff boy at £2 a week. He played for Spurs' nursery club Northfleet United and won a Kent Senior Cup winners medal in the final against Dover. He signed as a full professional for Tottenham in August 1938, and played his first Football League game at Ewood Park against Blackburn Rovers on 22 October 1938.

== Playing career ==
Nicholson joined the Durham Light Infantry on the outbreak of World War II in 1939. As a professional footballer he was sent on a Physical Education course and was made a sergeant-instructor, training new intakes of troops throughout the war. During the war he was a guest player for several clubs, including Newcastle United where he played on 19 occasions. Although the war probably cost him half his playing career, he did not regret it as his experiences taught him the man-management skills which were to have such a great effect later in his career.

In 1946, Nicholson returned to the Spurs first team, playing at centre half for two seasons, then moving to right half for a further six years. He was a vital part of the legendary "push and run" Tottenham team which won the league championship in the 1950–51 season.

He made his full international debut for England on 19 May 1951 against Portugal at Goodison Park, Liverpool, and made an immediate impression by scoring with his first touch of the ball after only 19 seconds. This proved to be his only international appearance due to injuries, his habit of putting his club before his country, and the dominance of Billy Wright. Nicholson is quoted as saying "My duty is to get fit for Tottenham. Well, they pay my wages, don't they?". Of his only appearance he said "Stan Pearson nodded it back and I ran on to let go a first time shot which, from the moment I hit it, I knew was going in. But for the next game they brought back Billy Wright and I accepted that because he was the better player". Nicholson is the only player to have scored for England with his first touch in international football and subsequently never play at that level again.

== Managerial career ==
Any player coming to Spurs, whether he's a big signing or just a ground staff boy, must be dedicated to the game and to the club. He must never be satisfied with his last performance, and he must hate losing.

— Bill Nicholson

Nicholson took a Football Association (FA) coaching course and joined the coaching staff at Tottenham upon his retirement as a player. He quickly rose through the ranks of the coaching staff to become first team coach in 1955. He subsequently assisted England manager Walter Winterbottom at the 1958 FIFA World Cup in Sweden.

On 11 October 1958, Nicholson was called to the Tottenham boardroom and appointed manager of the club in succession to Jimmy Anderson. At the time the club was sixth from the bottom of the First Division and there was little indication that the greatest period in the history of the club was about to begin. That afternoon, in the club's first game under Nicholson's management, Tottenham Hotspur beat Everton 10–4 at White Hart Lane. This represented a new club record, surpassed only by their 13–2 (10–1 at half-time) FA Cup replay win over Crewe Alexandra in the 1959–60 season.

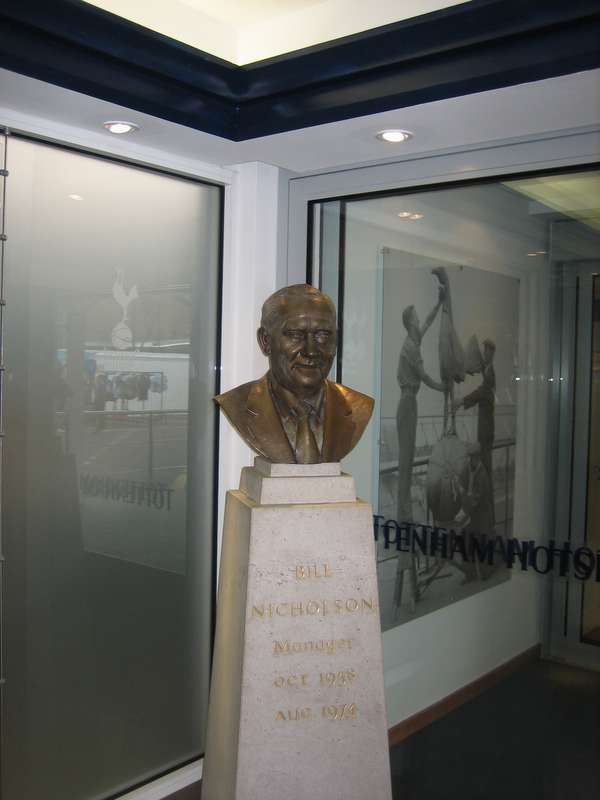
Bust of Nicholson at White Hart Lane

Less than two years later Spurs wrote their place in the history books when they won the Football League championship and the FA Cup in the 1960–61 season, the first "double" of the twentieth century. Spurs dominated the opposition that year, winning their first eleven games and scoring 115 goals in 42 games. The following year they won the FA Cup again, and narrowly missed a place in the 1961–62 European Cup Final, losing to Benfica in the semi-final.

In the 1962–63 season, Nicholson again put Spurs in the history books when they became the first British club to win a major European trophy. In Rotterdam on 15 May 1963, Spurs defeated favourites Atlético Madrid 5–1 to win the European Cup Winners Cup.

In 1966–67 Nicholson's Spurs won their third FA Cup in seven years by beating Chelsea in the first-ever all-London final. This was followed by a string of trophies in the early 1970s – the League Cup was won in 1970–71 and 1972–73, and the UEFA Cup in 1971–72.

As the 1970s wore on, Nicholson became increasingly disillusioned with football, in particular the increased player wages and the endemic hooliganism. He was appalled by the hooliganism he witnessed at the UEFA Cup final that Spurs lost to Feyenoord. Nicholson decided to resign after a poor start to the 1974–75 season and losing 4–0 to Middlesbrough in the League Cup in September 1974. Nicholson later said of his resignation: "The simple truth was that I was burned out, I had no more to offer." His tenure ended in acrimony as Nicholson wished to select for his replacement Danny Blanchflower as manager and Johnny Giles as player-coach, but Spurs chairman Sidney Wale was angered that Nicholson had contacted Giles and Blanchflower without his knowledge. Although Nicholson had intended to stay at the club as an advisor, the club chose to sever all ties with a £10,000 payoff and refused Nicholson a testimonial.

== Post-managerial career ==
After quitting the Spurs manager's job, Nicholson spent a year at West Ham United as an advisor and a scout. When Keith Burkinshaw became Spurs' manager in 1976, one of his first requests was that Nicholson be brought back to White Hart Lane as a consultant. His knowledge and experience were invaluable, and he showed that he still had an eye for players by recommending several to Burkinshaw, including Graham Roberts, Tony Galvin, and Gary Mabbutt. Nicholson continued to work as a consultant until 1991, when he was awarded the title of Club President.

== Recognition ==
Nicholson was appointed an OBE in 1975. In 1999 an approach road to White Hart Lane was named Bill Nicholson Way in his honour. On 8 August 2001, the club played a testimonial match in Nicholson's honour against Italian club ACF Fiorentina, following an initial testimonial against West Ham on 21 August 1983. In 2003 Nicholson was inducted into the English Football Hall of Fame in recognition of his impact as a manager. Spurs fans had also campaigned for many years to have Nicholson knighted in recognition of his outstanding achievements and contribution to football but they were unsuccessful.

Bill Nicholson died on 23 October 2004 after a long illness. His ashes, along with those of his wife, Darkie Nicholson, were buried beneath the pitch at White Hart Lane. During the demolition of the stadium and the construction of Tottenham Hotspur Stadium, their remains were temporarily relocated to a secure location overlooking the site, and were later re-interred following a private ceremony attended by the couple’s immediate family, at a spot where the new pitch overlapped the old.

Bill Nicholson has been credited with saying, 'It is better to fail aiming high than to succeed aiming low. And we of Spurs have set our sights very high, so high in fact that even failure will have in it an echo of glory.' Sports historian, Norman Giller, who has written biographies on both Nicholson and his skipper Danny Blanchflower, traces this quote to Blanchflower. "Bill was a blunt Yorkshireman who just did not use this sort of language," Giller has written in "Danny was the poet of the team and he both said this and wrote it in his newspaper columns when captain of Tottenham. Somehow somebody has put the words into Nicholson's mouth, but it was definitely Danny who said it first."

The main gates to the White Hart Lane stadium became known as the Bill Nicholson Gates after a photograph by Peter Robinson was published in the 1970s and featured Nicholson standing between the wrought iron gates. These were removed for safe-keeping in 2015 before the construction of the Tottenham Hotspur Stadium but were reinstated at the Tottenham Hotspur Stadium in 2025, at the PAXTON17 area between the Ticket Office and the buildings at the north of the stadium.

== Honours ==
=== As a player ===
Tottenham Hotspur

- Football League First Division: 1950–51
- Football League Second Division: 1949–50
- FA Charity Shield: 1951

=== As a manager ===
Tottenham Hotspur

- Football League First Division: 1960–61
- FA Cup: 1960–61, 1961–62, 1966–67
- Football League Cup: 1970–71, 1972–73
- FA Charity Shield: 1961, 1962, 1967 (shared)
- UEFA Cup: 1971–72; runner up: 1973–74
- European Cup Winners' Cup: 1962–63
- Anglo-Italian League Cup: 1971

== See also ==
- List of UEFA Cup winning managers
- Joy Brook
- List of English football championship-winning managers
- List of longest managerial reigns in association football
