= John Hollowbread =

English footballer

Personal information
- Full name: John Frederick Hollowbread
- Date of birth: 2 January 1934
- Place of birth: Ponders End, Middlesex, England
- Date of death: 7 December 2007 (aged 73)
- Place of death: Torrevieja, Spain
- Height: 5 ft 11 in (1.80 m)
- Position: Goalkeeper

Youth career
- Enfield
- 1950–1952: Tottenham Hotspur

Senior career*
Years	Team	Apps	(Gls)
1951	→ Cheshunt (on loan)	0	(0)
1952–1964	Tottenham Hotspur	67	(0)
1964–1966	Southampton	36	(0)
- * Club domestic league appearances and goals

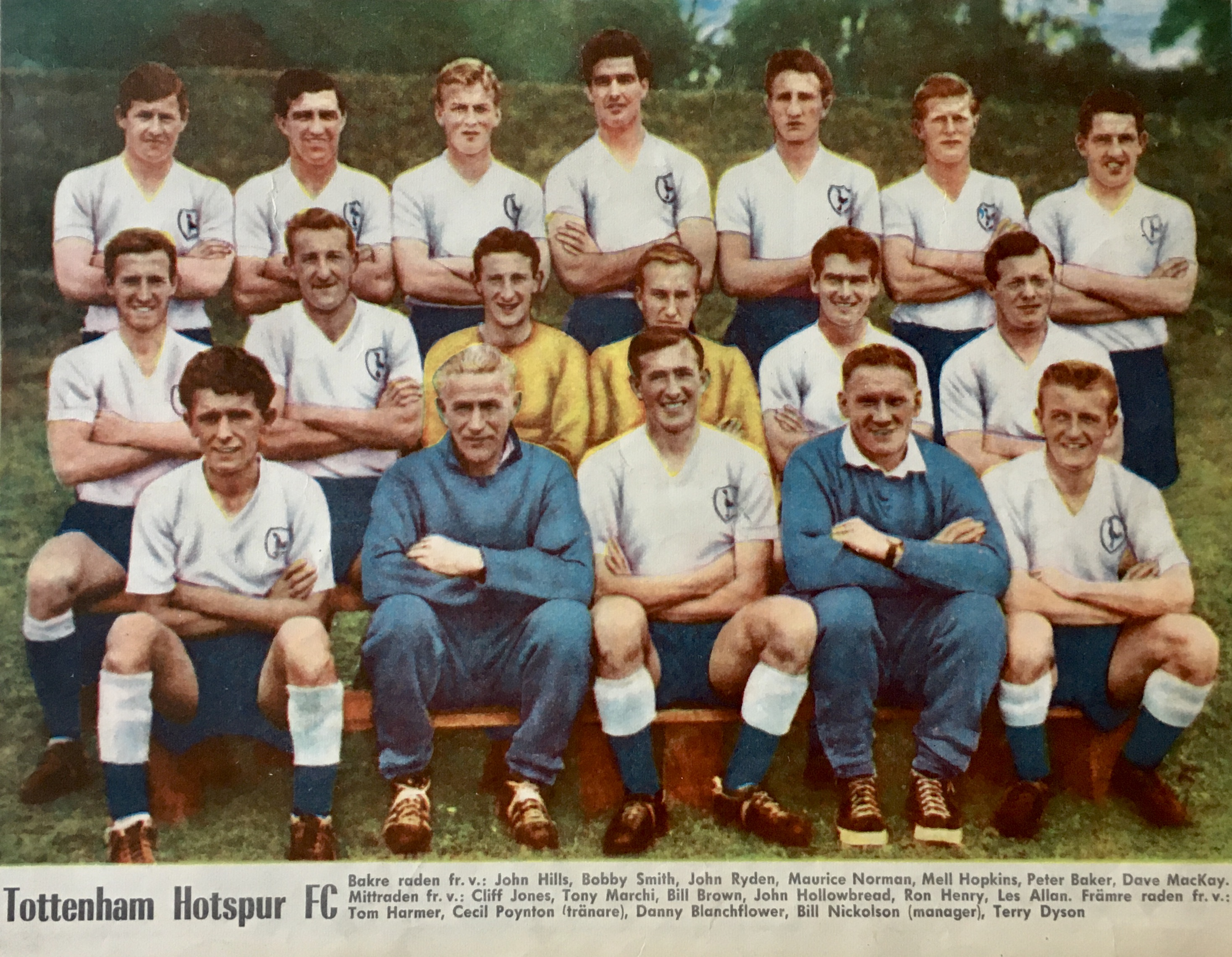
Tottenham Hotspur in 1960 with both goalkeeper, John Hollowbread, Bill Brown and Danny Blanchflower in the team with Bill Nicholson as manager.

John Frederick Hollowbread (2 January 1934 – 7 December 2007) was an English football goalkeeper who played for Tottenham Hotspur and Southampton.

== Playing career ==
He was born at Ponders End and represented Middlesex Schools and played for Enfield prior to signing amateur forms for Tottenham Hotspur in June 1950. He made one appearance on loan to Cheshunt in 1951 in the Herts Charity Cup against Barnet before Tottenham upgraded him to professional status on 21 January 1952, spending most of his early career as understudy to Ted Ditchburn and Ron Reynolds. He eventually made his first team debut in a 5–0 defeat at Blackburn Rovers on 30 August 1958.

In 1958–59 he played 44 games before losing his place to Bill Brown. From then on, he only made occasional appearances, including one in the 1960–61 double season to be one of 17 players used in the Double winning squad. He spent most of his time in the reserves, keeping goal in over 350 competitive games for the second and third teams. He scored a penalty for the reserves in an 8–0 win over Mansfield Town on 17 March 1962. His final senior appearance for Spurs was against Ipswich Town on 4 April 1964.

At the end of the 1963–64 season, he was placed on the transfer list and was snapped up straight away by Southampton's manager Ted Bates for a £3,000 fee. He played 30 consecutive games at the start of the 1964–65 season before losing his place to Tony Godfrey. The following season, he started as first choice for the 'keeper's shirt until sustaining a serious knee injury versus Coventry City on 8 September 1965 which ended his career. He made a total of 40 senior appearances for "the Saints".

He then played for Mullard Sports and was involved in the local football scene around the Southampton area for many years.

== Later career ==
He ran the Manor House Inn at Bursledon from 1966 and later worked as bar manager of the New Forest Golf Club at Bramshaw.

He ran the Sun Inn Public House in Romsey, Hampshire, England up until his migration to Spain with his wife Vera.

In 1994, he retired to Spain — he died following a short illness at Torrevieja, on the Costa Blanca.
