= Danny Blanchflower =

Northern Irish footballer (1926–1993)

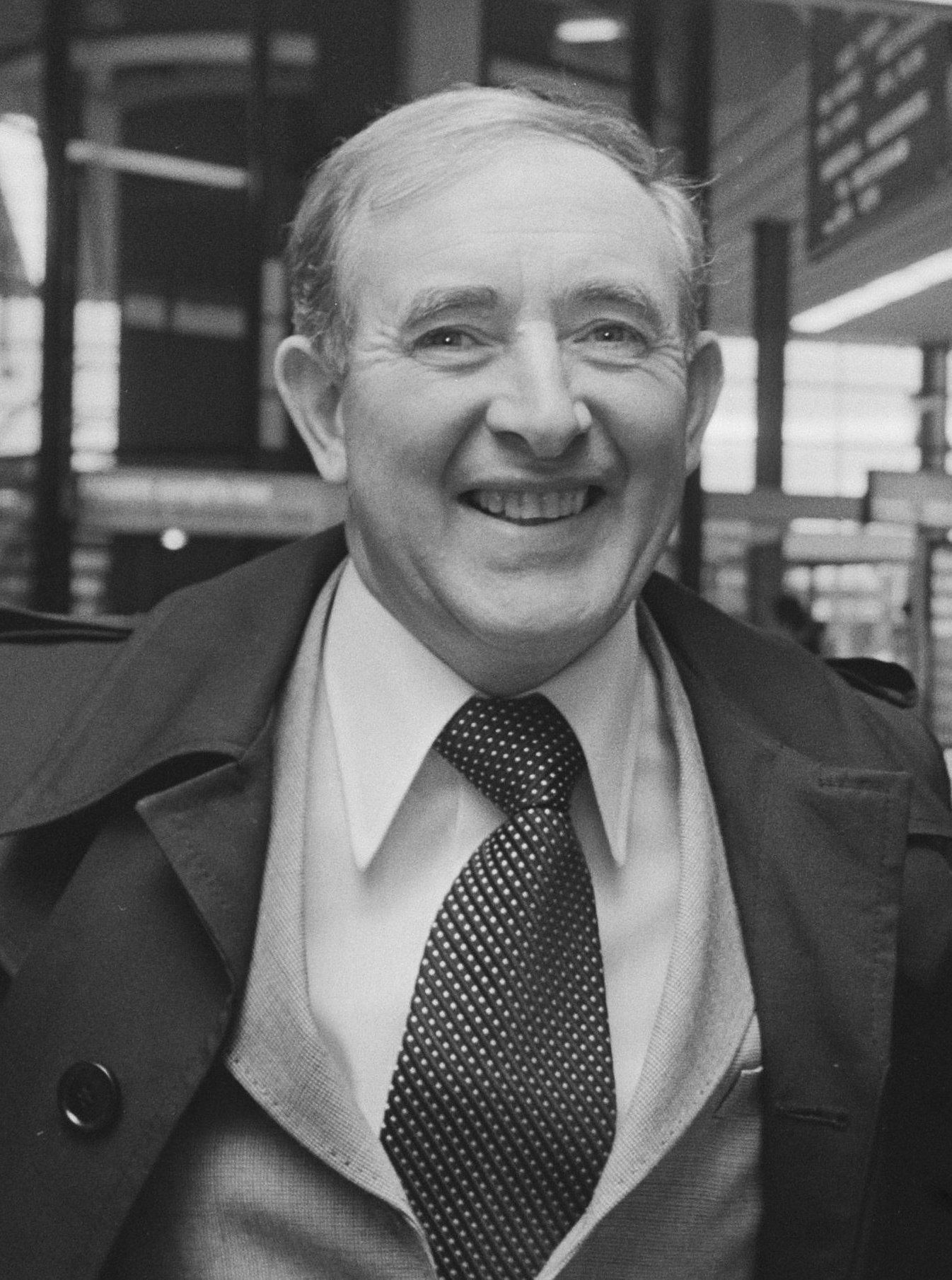
- Blanchflower in 1976

Personal information
- Full name: Robert Dennis Blanchflower
- Date of birth: 10 February 1926
- Place of birth: Belfast, Northern Ireland
- Date of death: 9 December 1993 (aged 67)
- Place of death: Staines, Surrey, England
- Height: 5 ft 9 in (1.75 m)
- Position: Right-half

Youth career
- Glentoran

Senior career*
Years	Team	Apps	(Gls)
1946–1949	Glentoran	124	(7)
1949–1951	Barnsley	68	(2)
1951–1954	Aston Villa	148	(10)
1954–1964	Tottenham Hotspur	337	(15)
1961	→ Toronto City (loan)	12	(3)
1962	→ Boksburg (loan)	4	(1)
1965	Durban City	3	(0)
Total		693	(38)

International career
1949–1963	Northern Ireland	56	(2)
1948–1949	Irish League XI	4	(0)

Managerial career
- 1976–1979: Northern Ireland
- 1978–1979: Chelsea
- * Club domestic league appearances and goals

Robert Dennis Blanchflower (10 February 1926 – 9 December 1993) was a Northern Ireland footballer, football manager and journalist who played for and captained Tottenham Hotspur, including during their double-winning season of 1960–61. He was twice Footballer of the Year and ranked as the greatest player in Spurs history by The Times in 2009. After a lengthy playing career, he retired at the age of 38. He became a respected football journalist and, later, a football manager.

Blanchflower said of football: "The great fallacy is that the game is first and last about winning. It is nothing of the kind. The game is about glory, it is about doing things in style and with a flourish, about going out and beating the other lot, not waiting for them to die of boredom".

== Early years and family ==
Blanchflower was born on 10 February 1926 in the Bloomfield district of Belfast, the first of five children born to John and Selina Blanchflower. His mother had played as a centre-forward on a women's football team. He was educated at Ravenscroft public elementary school and was awarded a scholarship to Belfast College of Technology.

He left early to become an apprentice electrician at Gallaher's cigarette factory in Belfast. He also joined the Air Raid Precautions (ARP) and in 1943 lied about his age to join the RAF. As a trainee navigator he was sent on a course to St Andrews University (where he acquired a lifelong love of golf) and in the spring of 1945 was posted to Canada for further training. By 1946, aged 20, he was back in Belfast, back at Gallaher's, and building a reputation as an outstanding footballer. While at St Andrews Blanchflower played for the University College Dundee football team which was coached by former Celtic, Dundee United and Scotland trainer Jack Qusklay.

His younger brother Jackie (1933–1998) was also a Northern Irish international footballer and played for Manchester United before his playing career was ended by injuries sustained in the Munich air disaster of February 1958.

== Playing career ==
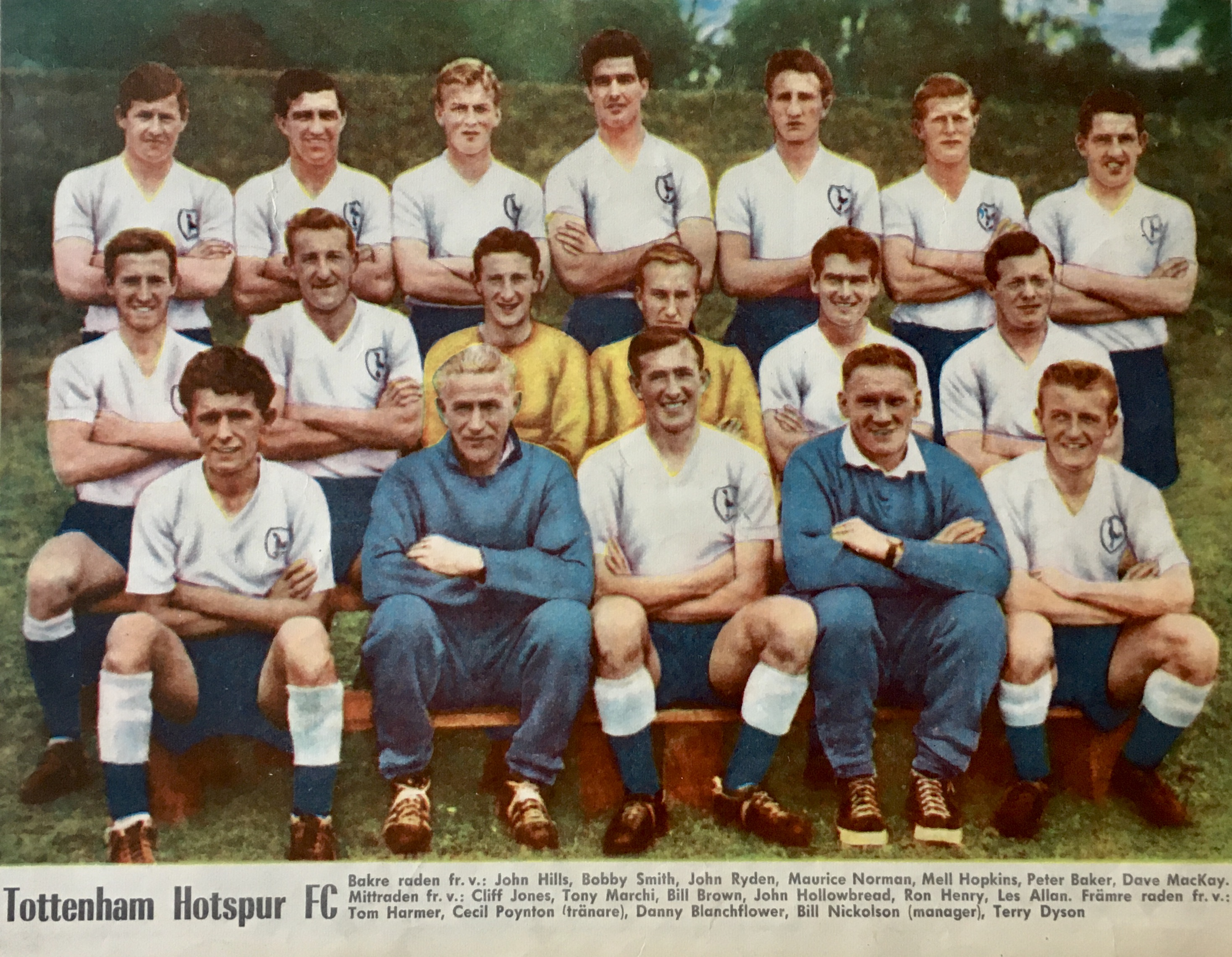
Tottenham Hotspur in 1960 with Danny Blanchflower and both goalkeepers, Bill Brown and John Hollowbread, in the team with Bill Nicholson as manager.

Blanchflower signed for Glentoran in 1946, before crossing the Irish Sea and signing for Barnsley for £6000 in 1949, at the age of 23.

Blanchflower transferred from Barnsley to Aston Villa for a fee of £15,000 in March 1951. That month, with defeat against Arsenal, Villa found themselves second from bottom with 20 points from 31 games. They seemed doomed to be relegated to the Second Division. The addition of a player as good Blanchflower lifted the spirits of the team, and, when he made his debut on 17 March, Villa's 3–2 victory over Burnley ended a run of six-straight defeats. Villa played their last nine games without defeat, eventually finishing six spots above the relegation zone occupied by Sheffield Wednesday and Everton.

Blanchflower made 155 senior appearances for Villa (148 in the League), before being sold during the 1954–55 season.

In 1954 Blanchflower was bought by Tottenham Hotspur for a fee of £30,000, and during his ten years at White Hart Lane he made 337 League appearances, and 382 total appearances (scoring 21 goals). The highlight of his time at Spurs came with the 1960–61 season. With Blanchflower as captain Spurs won their first 11 games, a record for the top flight of English football and eventually won the league by 8 points. They then beat Leicester City in the final of the FA Cup to become the first team in the 20th century to win the League and Cup double, not achieved since Aston Villa in 1897.

Blanchflower was voted FWA Footballer of the Year in 1958 and 1961.

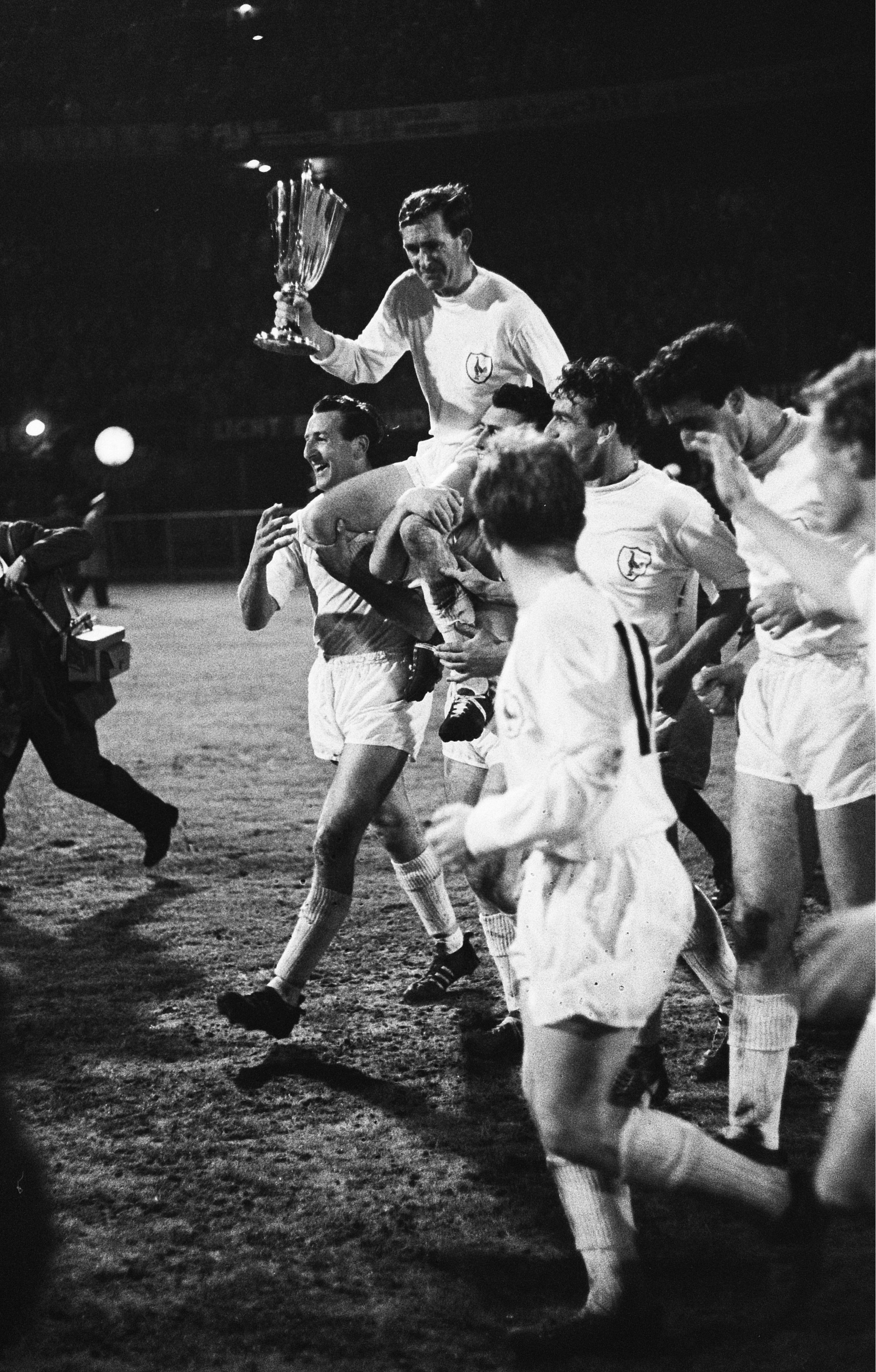
Blanchflower holding the UEFA Cup Winners' Cup trophy in 1963 after beating Atlético Madrid

In 1962 he helped Spurs win the FA Cup, scoring a penalty in the final against Burnley. In 1963 he captained his side to victory over Atlético Madrid in the final of the European Cup Winners' Cup.

During his time with Spurs he also had a short spell with Toronto City, alongside fellow Football League players Stanley Matthews and Johnny Haynes.

Making his debut in 1949, he earned 56 caps for Northern Ireland, and in 1958 captained his country when they reached the quarter-finals of the FIFA World Cup. He was the first Northern Irishman to achieve a half century of caps when he played against Wales in 1962.

On 4 December 1957 he captained the Northern Ireland team against Italy in Belfast, in a bad tempered game that came to be known as the "Battle of Belfast"; Blanchflower attempted to keep the peace as the game turned nasty.

He finally announced his retirement as a player of 5 April 1964 at the age of 38, having played nearly 400 games in all competitions for Spurs and captained them to four major trophies.

In 1965, Blanchflower briefly came out of retirement to play for Durban City. Blanchflower played three times for the club in South Africa's National Football League (NFL).

== Style of play ==
Considered to be the brains of the great Tottenham team of the 1960s, Blanchflower played as a defensive midfielder at right half and was known particularly for his accurate passing, his ability to dictate the tempo of the game and his inspiring leadership.

== Managerial career ==
Following his retirement as a player, Blanchflower coached at Spurs for a number of years, and double-winning manager Bill Nicholson intended for Blanchflower to be his long-term successor. When Nicholson resigned from the club in 1974 however, Blanchflower found himself being passed over in favour of Terry Neill, and subsequently left the club himself. He became manager of Northern Ireland for a spell in 1976, and was then appointed as Chelsea boss. However, he won only five of his 32 games in charge and he left them in September 1979.

== Off the field ==
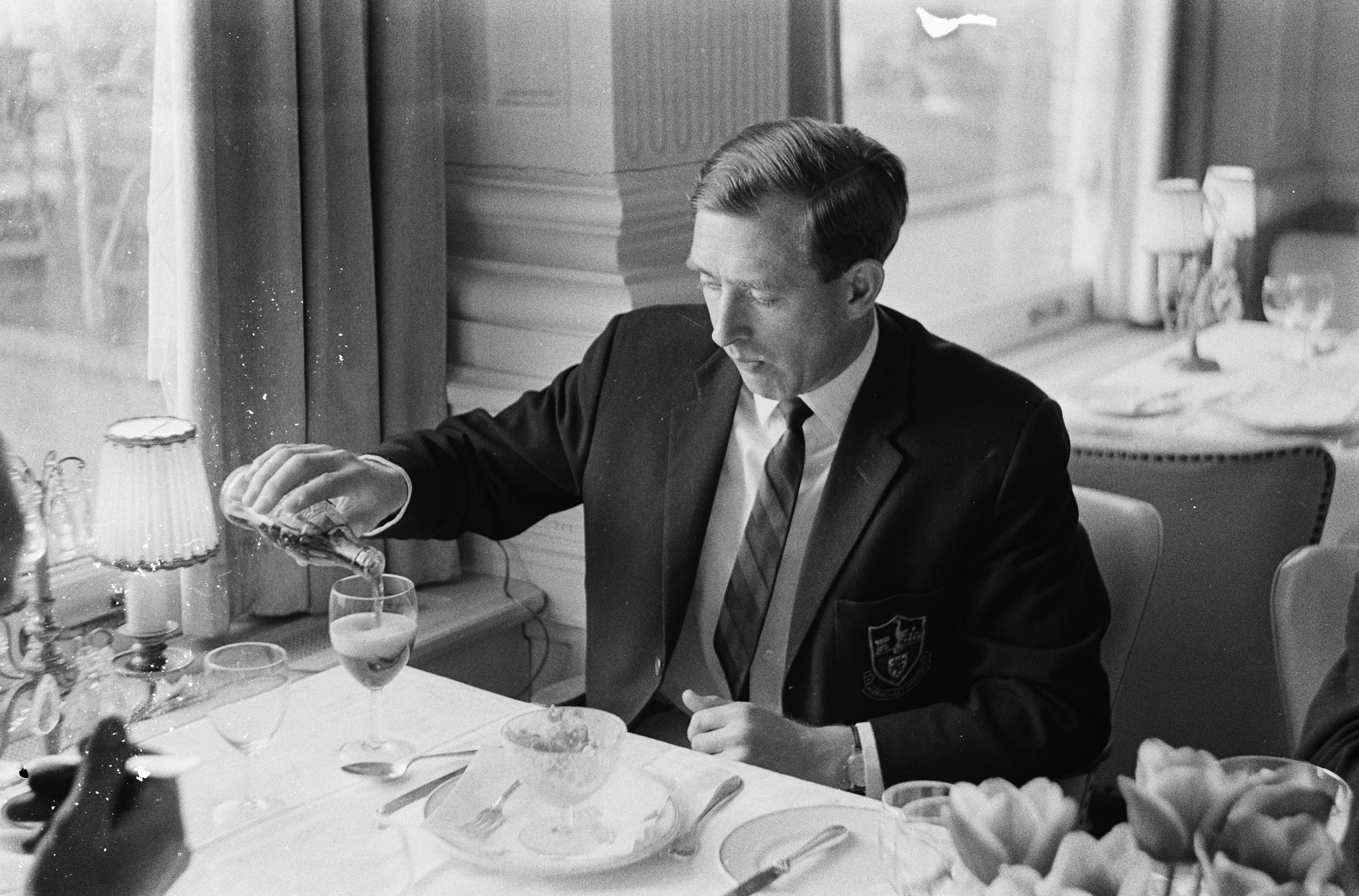
Danny Blanchflower in 1963

Blanchflower was one of only a handful of players to have been awarded the title of FWA Footballer of the Year on two occasions, winning in both 1958 and 1961.

He was one of many signatories in a letter to The Times on 17 July 1958 opposing 'the policy of apartheid' in international sport and defending 'the principle of racial equality which is embodied in the Declaration of the Olympic Games'. On 6 February 1961, he also became the first person to turn down the invitation to appear on This Is Your Life, walking away from host Eamonn Andrews. Contrary to belief, this incident was not broadcast live on air, but was being recorded to be shown at the beginning of the live transmission. "I consider this programme to be an invasion of privacy", he explained. "Nobody is going to press gang me into anything".

Blanchflower commentated on a match for ITV as early as 3 January 1956, for the final of the Southern Junior Floodlit Cup between West Ham and Chelsea. He also hosted editions of the BBC's Junior Sportsview in 1959 and ITV's Junior Criss Cross Quiz in the mid 60s. He was the colour commentator for the CBS television network broadcasts of National Professional Soccer League matches in the United States in 1967. His candour about the fledgling league's shortcomings distressed network executives, as he recounted in a 10 June 1968 Sports Illustrated article he authored. In the 1968–69 season he was the regular commentator for Yorkshire Television.

One of Blanchflower's best-known tongue-in-cheek remarks is: "We aim to equalise before the other team score. We should get our retaliation in first".

== Later life and death ==
Anton Weinberg's 1985 Channel 4 documentary film The Keller Instinct featured an appearance by Blanchflower, who spoke approvingly of his late friend musicologist Hans Keller's advocacy of inventive, tactically creative football. He retired from his position as a writer for the Sunday Express in 1988.

On 1 May 1990, Tottenham held a testimonial match for him at White Hart Lane, but by this stage he was in the first stages of what would later be diagnosed as Alzheimer's disease and Parkinson's disease.

He was eventually placed in Woodlands Nursing Home, Staines. He died there from pneumonia on 9 December 1993, aged 67. He was buried nearby at St. Jude's Cemetery, Englefield Green.

== Legacy ==
Blanchflower was honoured in his home city of Belfast with an Ulster History Circle plaque recognising his outstanding achievements in the world of sport. The blue plaque is located at 49 Grace Avenue, his childhood home.

The Danny Blanchflower Playing Fields in East Belfast, owned by Belfast City Council, was named after him. Plans to redevelop the site date to include more professional football facilities started in the mid-2000s and went through several revisions. By 2020, construction of a new stadium and grounds for Harland & Wolff Welders F.C. was underway in the park, to be followed by nature trails and community projects.

== Honours ==
Tottenham Hotspur

- Football League First Division: 1960–61
- FA Cup: 1960–61, 1961–62
- FA Charity Shield: 1961, 1962
- European Cup Winners' Cup: 1962–63

Individual

- FWA Footballer of the Year: 1958, 1961
- Ballon d'Or nominee: 1957, 1958, 1961
- FIFA World Cup All-Star Team: 1958
- English Football Hall of Fame: 2003
- World XI: 1961

== Filmography ==
- Those Glory Glory Days (1983)

== Bibliography ==
- David Bowler (1997). Danny Blanchflower: The Biography of a Visionary. Orion. ISBN 0-575-06504-4.
- Danny Blanchflower (1975). Football (Learn Through Strips). Imprint unknown.
- Danny Blanchflower (1961). The Double and Before. Nicholas Kaye.
- Danny Blanchflower (1959). Danny Blanchflower's Soccer Book. Frederick Muller.
- Danny Blanchflower (1955). Soccer my way. Vane.
- Brown, Geoff and Hogsbjerg, Christian. Apartheid is not a Game: Remembering the Stop the Seventy Tour campaign. London: Redwords, 2020. ISBN 9781912926589.
