= 2018–19 Borussia Dortmund season =

110th season in existence of Borussia Dortmund

Borussia Dortmund
2018–19 season
- President: Reinhard Rauball
- Chairman: Hans-Joachim Watzke
- Head coach: Lucien Favre
- Stadium: Signal Iduna Park
- Bundesliga: 2nd
- DFB-Pokal: Round of 16
- UEFA Champions League: Round of 16
- Top goalscorer: League: Paco Alcácer (18); All: Marco Reus (21)
- Highest home attendance: 81,365
- Lowest home attendance: 66,099
- Average home league attendance: 80,841
- Biggest win: Dortmund 7–0 Nürnberg
- Biggest defeat: Bayern 5–0 Dortmund
Home colours	Away colours	Third colours

The 2018–19 Borussia Dortmund season was the 110th season in the football club's history and the 43rd consecutive and 52nd overall season in the top flight of German football, the Bundesliga, having been promoted from the 2. Bundesliga Nord in 1976.

In addition to the domestic league, Borussia Dortmund also participated in the season's editions of the domestic cup, the DFB-Pokal, and the first-tier continental cup, the UEFA Champions League. This was the 45th season for Dortmund in the Signal Iduna Park, located in Dortmund, North Rhine-Westphalia, Germany. The season covered a period from 1 July 2018 to 30 June 2019.

The season was the first since 2001–02 without Roman Weidenfeller, who retired after the 2017–18 season.

== Players ==
=== Squad information ===
As of 31 January 2019

Note: Flags indicate national team as defined under FIFA eligibility rules; some limited exceptions apply. Players may hold more than one non-FIFA nationality.

No.	Pos.	Nation	Player
1	GK	SUI	Roman Bürki
2	DF	FRA	Dan-Axel Zagadou
4	DF	FRA	Abdou Diallo
5	DF	MAR	Achraf Hakimi (on loan from Real Madrid)
6	MF	DEN	Thomas Delaney
7	MF	ENG	Jadon Sancho
9	FW	ESP	Paco Alcácer
10	MF	GER	Mario Götze
11	FW	GER	Marco Reus (captain)
13	DF	POR	Raphaël Guerreiro
16	DF	SUI	Manuel Akanji
17	MF	ESP	Sergio Gómez
18	DF	ARG	Leonardo Balerdi
19	MF	GER	Mahmoud Dahoud

No.	Pos.	Nation	Player
20	FW	GER	Maximilian Philipp
22	MF	USA	Christian Pulisic (on loan from Chelsea)
25	GK	GER	Luca Unbehaun
26	DF	POL	Łukasz Piszczek (vice-captain)
27	FW	GER	Marius Wolf
28	MF	BEL	Axel Witsel
29	DF	GER	Marcel Schmelzer
31	MF	GER	Patrick Osterhage
33	MF	GER	Julian Weigl
34	FW	DEN	Jacob Bruun Larsen
35	GK	SUI	Marwin Hitz
36	DF	TUR	Ömer Toprak
37	MF	GER	Tobias Raschl
40	GK	GER	Eric Oelschlägel

== Transfers ==
=== Transfers in ===
#	Position	Player	Transferred from	Fee	Date	Source
35	GK	(Switzerland) Marwin Hitz	(Germany) Augsburg	Free	19 May 2018	
27	FW	(Germany) Marius Wolf	(Germany) Eintracht Frankfurt	Undisclosed	28 May 2018	
6	MF	(Denmark) Thomas Delaney	(Germany) Werder Bremen	Undisclosed	7 June 2018	
40	GK	(Germany) Eric Oelschlägel	(Germany) Werder Bremen	Undisclosed	20 June 2018	
4	DF	(France) Abdou Diallo	(Germany) Mainz	Undisclosed	26 June 2018	
28	MF	(Belgium) Axel Witsel	(China) Tianjin Quanjian	Undisclosed	6 August 2018	
9	FW	(Spain) Paco Alcácer	(Spain) Barcelona	Undisclosed	23 November 2018	
18	DF	(Argentina) Leonardo Balerdi	(Argentina) Boca Juniors	Undisclosed	14 January 2019	

==== Loans in ====
#	Position	Player	Loaned from	Date	Loan expires	Source
5	DF	(Morocco) Achraf Hakimi	(Spain) Real Madrid	11 July 2018	30 June 2020	
9	FW	(Spain) Paco Alcácer	(Spain) Barcelona	28 August 2018	Exercised transfer option on 23 November 2018	
22	MF	(United States) Christian Pulisic	(England) Chelsea	2 January 2019	30 June 2019	

=== Transfers out ===
#	Position	Player	Transferred to	Fee	Date	Source
1	GK	(Germany) Roman Weidenfeller	n/a	Retired	5 May 2018	
35	GK	(Germany) Dominik Reimann	(Germany) Holstein Kiel	Undisclosed	31 May 2018	
27	MF	(Germany) Gonzalo Castro	(Germany) Stuttgart	Undisclosed	29 June 2018	
25	DF	(Greece) Sokratis Papastathopoulos	(England) Arsenal	Undisclosed	2 July 2018	
24	DF	(Germany) Jan-Niklas Beste	(Germany) Werder Bremen	Undisclosed	4 July 2018	
9	FW	(Ukraine) Andriy Yarmolenko	(England) West Ham United	Undisclosed	11 July 2018	
37	DF	(Germany) Erik Durm	(England) Huddersfield Town	Undisclosed	13 July 2018	
8	MF	(Turkey) Nuri Şahin	(Germany) Werder Bremen	Undisclosed	31 August 2018	
22	MF	(United States) Christian Pulisic	(England) Chelsea	€64,000,000	2 January 2019	

==== Loans out ====
#	Position	Player	Loaned to	Date	Loan expires	Source
30	DF	(Germany) Felix Passlack	(England) Norwich City	2 July 2018	30 June 2019	
21	FW	(Germany) André Schürrle	(England) Fulham	25 July 2018	30 June 2020	
18	MF	(Germany) Sebastian Rode	(Germany) Frankfurt	27 December 2018	30 June 2019	
14	FW	(Sweden) Alexander Isak	(Netherlands) Willem II	25 January 2019	30 June 2019	
32	MF	(Germany) Dženis Burnić	(Germany) Dresden	31 January 2019	30 June 2019	
23	MF	(Japan) Shinji Kagawa	(Turkey) Beşiktaş	31 January 2019	30 June 2019	
15	DF	(Germany) Jeremy Toljan	(Scotland) Celtic	31 January 2019	30 June 2019	

== Kits ==
Home (League)	Home alt.1 (League)	Away	Third	Home (Cup+Europe)	Home alt.1 (Cup+Europe)	Goalkeeper 1	Goalkeeper 2

== Friendly matches ==
Win Draw Loss

13 July 2018	Austria Wien	0–1	Borussia Dortmund	Vienna, Austria
19:00 CEST (UTC+2)		Report	Isak 39'	Stadium: Generali Arena; Attendance: 17,000; Referee: Julian Weinberger (Austria)

20 July 2018 2018 ICC	Manchester City	0–1	Borussia Dortmund	Chicago, United States
20:00 CDT (UTC-5); 03:00 CEST (UTC+2)		Report	Götze 27' (pen.)	Stadium: Soldier Field; Attendance: 34,629; Referee: Armando Villarreal (United States)

22 July 2018 2018 ICC	Liverpool	1–3	Borussia Dortmund	Charlotte, United States
16:00 EDT (UTC-4); 22:00 CEST (UTC+2)	Van Dijk 25'	Report	Pulisic 66' (pen.), 89'; Bruun Larsen 90+3'	Stadium: Bank of America Stadium; Attendance: 55,447; Referee: Allen Chapman (United States)

25 July 2018 2018 ICC	Borussia Dortmund	2–2 (3–4 p)	Benfica	Pittsburgh, United States
20:00 EDT (UTC-4); 02:00 CEST (UTC+2)	Philipp 20', 22'	Report	Almeida 51'; Semedo 69'	Stadium: Heinz Field; Attendance: 16,171; Referee: Nima Saghafi (United States)
	Penalties
	Wolf (penalty scored); Gómez (penalty missed); Burnić (penalty scored); Sancho (penalty scored); Isak (penalty missed)		(penalty scored) Lema; (penalty scored) Jonas; (penalty scored) Ferreyra; (penalty missed) Samaris; (penalty scored) Salvio

3 August 2018	Borussia Dortmund	1–1	Rennes	Altach, Austria
19:30 CEST (UTC+2)	Piszczek 2'	Report	Del Castillo 90' (pen.)	Stadium: Cashpoint-Arena; Attendance: 3,940

7 August 2018	Borussia Dortmund	4–3	Zürich	Bad Ragaz, Switzerland
11:00 CEST (UTC+2)	Bruun Larsen 11', 54', 74'; Reus 23'	Report	Schönbächler 9'; Rodríguez 27', 76'	Stadium: Sportplatz Ri-Au

7 August 2018	Borussia Dortmund	1–3	Napoli	St. Gallen, Switzerland
19:30 CEST (UTC+2)	Philipp 65'	Report	Milik 7'; Maksimović 29'; Callejón 90+1'	Stadium: kybunpark Attendance: 13,382; Referee: Nikolaj Hänni (Switzerland)

12 August 2018	Borussia Dortmund	1–0	Lazio	Essen, Germany
17:30 CEST (UTC+2)	Reus 6'	Report		Stadium: Stadion Essen; Referee: Martin Thompsen (Germany)

6 September 2018	VfL Osnabrück	0–6	Borussia Dortmund	Osnabrück, Germany
19:00 CEST (UTC+2)		Report	Bruun Larsen 9', 24', 25', 41'; Gómez 32'; Philipp 78'	Stadium: Stadion an der Bremer Brücke; Attendance: 9,563; Referee: Frank Willenborg (Germany)

15 October 2018	Alemannia Aachen	0–4	Borussia Dortmund	Aachen, Germany
18:30 CEST (UTC+2)		Report	Wanner 9'; Ametov 25'; Götze 67'; Philipp 76'	Stadium: Tivoli; Attendance: 15,800

7 January 2019	Borussia Dortmund	3–2	Fortuna Düsseldorf	San Pedro de Alcántara, Spain
16:00 CET (UTC+1)	Philipp 31', 35'; Schmelzer 90'	Report	Stöger 15'; Kaminski 67'	Stadium: Marbella Football Center

11 January 2019	Borussia Dortmund	3–2	Willem II	San Pedro de Alcántara, Spain
12:00 CET (UTC+1)	Llonch 20' (o.g.); Isak 81'; Hakimi 90'	Report	Özbiliz 16'; Kristinsson 38'	Stadium: Marbella Football Center

11 January 2019	Borussia Dortmund	2–1	Feyenoord	San Pedro de Alcántara, Spain
17:00 CET (UTC+1)	Philipp 52'; Guerreiro 70'	Report	Nieuwkoop 75'	Stadium: Marbella Football Center

== Competitions ==
Win Draw Loss

=== Overview ===
Competition	First match	Last match	Starting round	Final position	Record							
Competition	First match	Last match	Starting round	Final position	Pld	W	D	L	GF	GA	GD	Win %
Bundesliga	26 August 2018	18 May 2019	Matchday 1	2nd	34	23	7	4	81	44	+37	67.65
DFB-Pokal	20 August 2018	5 February 2019	First round	Round of 16	3	2	1	0	8	6	+2	66.67
Champions League	18 September 2018	5 March 2019	Group stage	Round of 16	8	4	1	3	10	6	+4	50.00
Total					45	29	9	7	99	56	+43	64.44

Last updated: 25 May 2019
Source: Competitions

=== Bundesliga ===
==== League table ====
Pos	Team	Pld	W	D	L	GF	GA	GD	Pts	Qualification or relegation
1	Bayern Munich (C)	34	24	6	4	88	32	+56	78	Qualification for the Champions League group stage
2	Borussia Dortmund	34	23	7	4	81	44	+37	76	Qualification for the Champions League group stage
3	RB Leipzig	34	19	9	6	63	29	+34	66	Qualification for the Champions League group stage
4	Bayer Leverkusen	34	18	4	12	69	52	+17	58	Qualification for the Champions League group stage
5	Borussia Mönchengladbach	34	16	7	11	55	42	+13	55	Qualification for the Europa League group stage (Note: Since the winners of the 2018–19 DFB-Pokal, Bayern Munich, qualified for the Champions League based on league position, the Europa League group stage spot was passed to the sixth-placed team, and the Europa League second qualifying round spot was passed to the seventh-placed team.)

Source: DFB
Rules for classification: 1) Points; 2) Goal difference; 3) Goals scored; 4) Head-to-head results; 5) Head-to-head away goals scored; 6) Away goals scored; 7) Play-off
(C) Champions

==== Results summary ====
Overall								Home						Away					
Pld	W	D	L	GF	GA	GD	Pts	W	D	L	GF	GA	GD	W	D	L	GF	GA	GD
34	23	7	4	81	44	+37	76	14	2	1	52	25	+27	9	5	3	29	19	+10

Last updated: 25 May 2019.
Source: Bundesliga

==== Results by round ====
Round	1	2	3	4	5	6	7	8	9	10	11	12	13	14	15	16	17	18	19	20	21	22	23	24	25	26	27	28	29	30	31	32	33	34
Ground	H	A	H	A	H	A	H	A	H	A	H	A	H	A	H	A	H	A	H	A	H	A	H	A	H	A	H	A	H	A	H	A	H	A
Result	W	D	W	D	W	W	W	W	D	W	W	W	W	W	W	L	W	W	W	D	D	D	W	L	W	W	W	L	W	W	L	D	W	W
Position	1	4	2	3	2	1	1	1	1	1	1	1	1	1	1	1	1	1	1	1	1	1	1	1	2	2	1	2	2	2	2	2	2	2

Updated to match(es) played on 25 May 2019. Source: DFB
A = Away; H = Home; W = Win; D = Draw; L = Loss

==== Matches ====
26 August 2018 1	Borussia Dortmund	4–1	RB Leipzig	Dortmund
18:00 CEST (UTC+2)	Dahoud 21'; Sabitzer 40' (o.g.); Witsel 43'; Reus 90+1'	Report	Augustin 1'	Stadium: Signal Iduna Park; Attendance: 80,365; Referee: Deniz Aytekin

31 August 2018 2	Hannover 96	0–0	Borussia Dortmund	Hanover
20:30 CEST (UTC+2)		Report		Stadium: HDI-Arena; Attendance: 49,000; Referee: Felix Zwayer

14 September 2018 3	Borussia Dortmund	3–1	Eintracht Frankfurt	Dortmund
20:30 CEST (UTC+2)	Diallo 36'; Wolf 72'; Alcácer 88'	Report	Haller 68'	Stadium: Signal Iduna Park; Attendance: 81,000; Referee: Benjamin Cortus

22 September 2018 4	1899 Hoffenheim	1–1	Borussia Dortmund	Sinsheim
15:30 CEST (UTC+2)	Joelinton 44'	Report	Pulisic 84'	Stadium: Wirsol Rhein-Neckar-Arena; Attendance: 30,150; Referee: Harm Osmers

26 September 2018 5	Borussia Dortmund	7–0	1. FC Nürnberg	Dortmund
20:30 CEST (UTC+2)	Bruun Larsen 9'; Reus 32', 58'; Hakimi 49'; Akanji 74'; Sancho 85'; Weigl 88'	Report		Stadium: Signal Iduna Park; Attendance: 75,700; Referee: Patrick Ittrich

29 September 2018 6	Bayer Leverkusen	2–4	Borussia Dortmund	Leverkusen
18:30 CEST (UTC+2)	Weiser 9'; Tah 39'	Report	Bruun Larsen 65'; Reus 69'; Alcácer 85', 90+4'	Stadium: BayArena; Attendance: 30,210; Referee: Felix Brych

6 October 2018 7	Borussia Dortmund	4–3	FC Augsburg	Dortmund
15:30 CEST (UTC+2)	Alcácer 62', 80', 90+6'; Götze 84'	Report	Finnbogason 22'; Max 71'; Gregoritsch 87'	Stadium: Signal Iduna Park; Attendance: 81,365; Referee: Markus Schmidt

20 October 2018 8	VfB Stuttgart	0–4	Borussia Dortmund	Stuttgart
15:30 CEST (UTC+2)		Report	Sancho 3'; Reus 23'; Alcácer 25'; Philipp 85'	Stadium: Mercedes-Benz Arena; Attendance: 59,000; Referee: Manuel Gräfe

27 October 2018 9	Borussia Dortmund	2–2	Hertha BSC	Dortmund
15:30 CEST (UTC+2)	Sancho 27', 61'	Report	Kalou 41', 90+1' (pen.)	Stadium: Signal Iduna Park; Attendance: 81,000; Referee: Sascha Stegemann

3 November 2018 10	VfL Wolfsburg	0–1	Borussia Dortmund	Wolfsburg
15:30 CET (UTC+1)		Report	Reus 27'	Stadium: Volkswagen Arena; Attendance: 30,000; Referee: Daniel Siebert

10 November 2018 11	Borussia Dortmund	3–2	Bayern Munich	Dortmund
18:30 CET (UTC+1)	Reus 49' (pen.), 67'; Alcácer 73'	Report	Lewandowski 26', 52'	Stadium: Signal Iduna Park; Attendance: 81,365; Referee: Manuel Gräfe

24 November 2018 12	Mainz 05	1–2	Borussia Dortmund	Mainz
15:30 CET (UTC+1)	Quaison 70'	Report	Alcácer 66'; Piszczek 76'	Stadium: Opel Arena; Attendance: 33,305; Referee: Deniz Aytekin

1 December 2018 13	Borussia Dortmund	2–0	SC Freiburg	Dortmund
15:30 CET (UTC+1)	Reus 40' (pen.); Alcácer 90+1'	Report		Stadium: Signal Iduna Park; Attendance: 81,365; Referee: Frank Willenborg

8 December 2018 14	Schalke 04	1–2	Borussia Dortmund	Gelsenkirchen
15:30 CET (UTC+1)	Caligiuri 61' (pen.)	Report	Delaney 7'; Sancho 74'	Stadium: Veltins-Arena; Attendance: 61,767; Referee: Daniel Siebert

15 December 2018 15	Borussia Dortmund	2–1	Werder Bremen	Dortmund
18:30 CET (UTC+1)	Alcácer 19'; Reus 27'	Report	Kruse 35'	Stadium: Signal Iduna Park; Attendance: 81,365; Referee: Guido Winkmann

18 December 2018 16	Fortuna Düsseldorf	2–1	Borussia Dortmund	Düsseldorf
20:30 CET (UTC+1)	Lukebakio 22'; Zimmer 56'	Report	Alcácer 81'	Stadium: Merkur Spiel-Arena; Attendance: 52,000; Referee: Tobias Welz

21 December 2018 17	Borussia Dortmund	2–1	Borussia Mönchengladbach	Dortmund
20:30 CET (UTC+1)	Sancho 42'; Reus 54'	Report	Kramer 45+1'	Stadium: Signal Iduna Park; Attendance: 81,365; Referee: Felix Zwayer

19 January 2019 18	RB Leipzig	0–1	Borussia Dortmund	Leipzig
18:30 CET (UTC+1)		Report	Witsel 19'	Stadium: Red Bull Arena; Attendance: 41,939; Referee: Deniz Aytekin

26 January 2019 19	Borussia Dortmund	5–1	Hannover 96	Dortmund
15:30 CET (UTC+1)	Hakimi 24'; Reus 60'; Götze 62'; Guerreiro 67'; Witsel 90'	Report	Bakalorz 86'	Stadium: Signal Iduna Park; Attendance: 81,365; Referee: Manuel Gräfe

2 February 2019 20	Eintracht Frankfurt	1–1	Borussia Dortmund	Frankfurt
15:30 CET (UTC+1)	Jović 36'	Report	Reus 22'	Stadium: Commerzbank-Arena; Attendance: 51,500; Referee: Felix Zwayer

9 February 2019 21	Borussia Dortmund	3–3	1899 Hoffenheim	Dortmund
15:30 CET (UTC+1)	Sancho 32'; Götze 43'; Guerreiro 66'	Report	Belfodil 75', 87'; Kadeřábek 83'	Stadium: Signal Iduna Park; Attendance: 81,365; Referee: Marco Fritz

18 February 2019 22	1. FC Nürnberg	0–0	Borussia Dortmund	Nuremberg
20:30 CET (UTC+1)		Report		Stadium: Max-Morlock-Stadion; Attendance: 50,000; Referee: Harm Osmers

24 February 2019 23	Borussia Dortmund	3–2	Bayer Leverkusen	Dortmund
18:00 CET (UTC+1)	Zagadou 30'; Sancho 38'; Götze 60'	Report	Volland 37'; Tah 75'	Stadium: Signal Iduna Park; Attendance: 81,029; Referee: Christian Dingert

1 March 2019 24	FC Augsburg	2–1	Borussia Dortmund	Augsburg
20:30 CET (UTC+1)	Ji 24', 67'	Report	Alcácer 81'	Stadium: WWK Arena; Attendance: 30,660; Referee: Tobias Stieler

9 March 2019 25	Borussia Dortmund	3–1	VfB Stuttgart	Dortmund
15:30 CET (UTC+1)	Reus 62' (pen.); Alcácer 84'; Pulisic 90+2'	Report	Kempf 71'	Stadium: Signal Iduna Park; Attendance: 81,365; Referee: Benjamin Cortus

16 March 2019 26	Hertha BSC	2–3	Borussia Dortmund	Berlin
18:30 CET (UTC+1)	Kalou 4', 35' (pen.)	Report	Delaney 14'; Zagadou 47'; Reus 90+2'	Stadium: Olympiastadion Berlin; Attendance: 74,667; Referee: Tobias Welz

30 March 2019 27	Borussia Dortmund	2–0	VfL Wolfsburg	Dortmund
15:30 CET (UTC+1)	Alcácer 90+1', 90+4'	Report		Stadium: Signal Iduna Park; Attendance: 81,365; Referee: Markus Schmidt

6 April 2019 28	Bayern Munich	5–0	Borussia Dortmund	Munich
18:30 CEST (UTC+2)	Hummels 10'; Lewandowski 17', 89'; Martínez 41'; Gnabry 43'	Report		Stadium: Allianz Arena; Attendance: 75,000; Referee: Manuel Gräfe

13 April 2019 29	Borussia Dortmund	2–1	Mainz 05	Dortmund
18:30 CEST (UTC+2)	Sancho 17', 24'	Report	Quaison 83'	Stadium: Signal Iduna Park; Attendance: 81,365; Referee: Deniz Aytekin

21 April 2019 30	SC Freiburg	0–4	Borussia Dortmund	Freiburg
15:30 CEST (UTC+2)		Report	Sancho 12'; Reus 54'; Götze 79'; Alcácer 87' (pen.)	Stadium: Schwarzwald-Stadion; Attendance: 24,000; Referee: Robert Hartmann

27 April 2019 31	Borussia Dortmund	2–4	Schalke 04	Dortmund
15:30 CEST (UTC+2)	Götze 14'; Witsel 85'	Report	Caligiuri 18' (pen.), 62'; Sané 28'; Embolo 86'	Stadium: Signal Iduna Park; Attendance: 80,196; Referee: Felix Zwayer

4 May 2019 32	Werder Bremen	2–2	Borussia Dortmund	Bremen
18:30 CEST (UTC+2)	Möhwald 70'; Pizarro 75'	Report	Pulisic 6'; Alcácer 41'	Stadium: Weser-Stadion; Attendance: 42,100; Referee: Marco Fritz

11 May 2019 33	Borussia Dortmund	3–2	Fortuna Düsseldorf	Dortmund
15:30 CEST (UTC+2)	Pulisic 41'; Delaney 53'; Götze 90+2'	Report	Fink 47'; Kownacki 90+5'	Stadium: Signal Iduna Park; Attendance: 81,365; Referee: Tobias Stieler

18 May 2019 34	Borussia Mönchengladbach	0–2	Borussia Dortmund	Mönchengladbach
15:30 CEST (UTC+2)		Report	Sancho 45'; Reus 54'	Stadium: Borussia-Park; Attendance: 54,022; Referee: Manuel Gräfe

=== DFB-Pokal ===
20 August 2018 First round	Greuther Fürth	1–2 (a.e.t.)	Borussia Dortmund	Fürth
20:45 CEST (UTC+2)	Ernst 77'	Report	Witsel 90+5'; Reus 120+1'	Stadium: Sportpark Ronhof Thomas Sommer; Attendance: 15,500; Referee: Manuel Gräfe

31 October 2018 Second round	Borussia Dortmund	3–2 (a.e.t.)	Union Berlin	Dortmund
18:30 CET (UTC+1)	Pulisic 40'; Philipp 73'; Reus 120+1' (pen.)	Report	Polter 63', 87'	Stadium: Signal Iduna Park; Attendance: 72,732; Referee: Guido Winkmann

5 February 2019 Round of 16	Borussia Dortmund	3–3 (a.e.t.) (2–4 p)	Werder Bremen	Dortmund
20:45 CET (UTC+1)	Reus 45+3'; Pulisic 105'; Hakimi 113'	Report	Rashica 5'; Pizarro 108'; Harnik 119'	Stadium: Signal Iduna Park; Attendance: 81,365; Referee: Felix Brych
	Penalties
	Alcácer (penalty missed); Philipp (penalty missed); Witsel (penalty scored); Weigl (penalty scored)		(penalty scored) Pizarro; (penalty scored) M. Eggestein; (penalty scored) Klaassen; (penalty scored) Kruse

=== UEFA Champions League ===
==== Group stage ====
Pos	Team	Pld	W	D	L	GF	GA	GD	Pts	Qualification	DOR	ATM	BRU	MON
1	(Germany) Borussia Dortmund	6	4	1	1	10	2	+8	13 (Note: Head-to-head goal difference: Borussia Dortmund +2, Atlético Madrid –2.)	Advance to knockout phase	—	4–0	0–0	3–0
2	(Spain) Atlético Madrid	6	4	1	1	9	6	+3	13	Advance to knockout phase	2–0	—	3–1	2–0
3	(Belgium) Club Brugge	6	1	3	2	6	5	+1	6	Transfer to Europa League	0–1	0–0	—	1–1
4	(France) Monaco	6	0	1	5	2	14	−12	1		0–2	1–2	0–4	—

Source: UEFA
Rules for classification: Group stage tiebreakers
Notes:

18 September 2018 1	Club Brugge (Belgium)	0–1	(Germany) Borussia Dortmund	Bruges, Belgium
21:00 CEST (UTC+2)		Report	Pulisic 85'	Stadium: Jan Breydel Stadium; Attendance: 25,181; Referee: Danny Makkelie (Netherlands)

3 October 2018 2	Borussia Dortmund (Germany)	3–0	(France) Monaco	Dortmund, Germany
21:00 CEST (UTC+2)	Bruun Larsen 51'; Alcácer 72'; Reus 90+2'	Report		Stadium: Signal Iduna Park; Attendance: 66,099; Referee: Aleksei Kulbakov (Belarus)

24 October 2018 3	Borussia Dortmund (Germany)	4–0	(Spain) Atlético Madrid	Dortmund, Germany
21:00 CEST (UTC+2)	Witsel 38'; Guerreiro 73', 89'; Sancho 83'	Report		Stadium: Signal Iduna Park; Attendance: 66,099; Referee: Anthony Taylor (England)

6 November 2018 4	Atlético Madrid (Spain)	2–0	(Germany) Borussia Dortmund	Madrid, Spain
21:00 CET (UTC+1)	Saúl 33'; Griezmann 80'	Report		Stadium: Wanda Metropolitano; Attendance: 61,023; Referee: Daniele Orsato (Italy)

28 November 2018 5	Borussia Dortmund (Germany)	0–0	(Belgium) Club Brugge	Dortmund, Germany
21:00 CET (UTC+1)		Report		Stadium: Signal Iduna Park; Attendance: 66,099; Referee: Gediminas Mažeika (Lithuania)

11 December 2018 6	Monaco (France)	0–2	(Germany) Borussia Dortmund	Fontvieille, Monaco
21:00 CET (UTC+1)		Report	Guerreiro 15', 88'	Stadium: Stade Louis II; Attendance: 8,731; Referee: Craig Pawson (England)

==== Knockout phase ====
===== Round of 16 =====
13 February 2019 First leg	Tottenham Hotspur (England)	3–0	(Germany) Borussia Dortmund	London, England
20:00 GMT (UTC±0); 21:00 CET (UTC+1)	Son 47'; Vertonghen 83'; Llorente 86'	Report		Stadium: Wembley Stadium; Attendance: 71,214; Referee: Antonio Mateu Lahoz (Spain)

5 March 2019 Second leg	Borussia Dortmund (Germany)	0–1 (0–4 agg.)	(England) Tottenham Hotspur	Dortmund, Germany
21:00 CET (UTC+1)		Report	Kane 49'	Stadium: Signal Iduna Park; Attendance: 66,099; Referee: Danny Makkelie (Netherlands)

== Statistics ==
=== Appearances and goals ===
No.	Pos	Nat	Player	Total		Bundesliga		DFB-Pokal		Champions League	
No.	Pos	Nat	Player	Apps	Goals	Apps	Goals	Apps	Goals	Apps	Goals
Goalkeepers
1	GK	(Switzerland) SUI	Roman Bürki	40	0	32	0	1	0	7	0
35	GK	(Switzerland) SUI	Marwin Hitz	4	0	2	0	1	0	1	0
40	GK	(Germany) GER	Eric Oelschlägel	1	0	0	0	1	0	0	0
Defenders
2	DF	(France) FRA	Dan-Axel Zagadou	22	2	15+2	2	1	0	4	0
4	DF	(France) FRA	Abdou Diallo	38	1	27+1	1	3	0	7	0
5	DF	(Morocco) MAR	Achraf Hakimi	28	3	19+2	2	2	1	4+1	0
13	DF	(Portugal) POR	Raphaël Guerreiro	32	6	17+6	2	1+2	0	3+3	4
16	DF	(Switzerland) SUI	Manuel Akanji	31	1	25	1	1	0	5	0
18	DF	(Argentina) ARG	Leonardo Balerdi	0	0	0	0	0	0	0	0
26	DF	(Poland) POL	Łukasz Piszczek	26	1	20	1	1	0	5	0
29	DF	(Germany) GER	Marcel Schmelzer	13	0	6+3	0	1	0	2+1	0
36	DF	(Turkey) TUR	Ömer Toprak	14	0	1+8	0	2	0	3	0
Midfielders
6	MF	(Denmark) DEN	Thomas Delaney	38	3	27+3	3	2	0	4+2	0
7	MF	(England) ENG	Jadon Sancho	43	13	26+8	12	0+2	0	5+2	1
10	MF	(Germany) GER	Mario Götze	34	7	19+7	7	2	0	5+1	0
17	MF	(Spain) ESP	Sergio Gómez	1	0	0	0	0	0	0+1	0
19	MF	(Germany) GER	Mahmoud Dahoud	22	1	7+7	1	2+1	0	3+2	0
22	MF	(United States) USA	Christian Pulisic	30	7	9+11	4	3	2	5+2	1
28	MF	(Belgium) BEL	Axel Witsel	43	6	32+1	4	1+2	1	7	1
33	MF	(Germany) GER	Julian Weigl	24	1	16+2	1	2	0	3+1	0
Forwards
9	FW	(Spain) ESP	Paco Alcácer	32	19	11+15	18	0+1	0	4+1	1
11	FW	(Germany) GER	Marco Reus	36	21	27	17	2+1	3	6	1
20	FW	(Germany) GER	Maximilian Philipp	23	2	9+9	1	1+2	1	1+1	0
27	FW	(Germany) GER	Marius Wolf	22	1	10+6	1	2	0	3+1	0
34	FW	(Denmark) DEN	Jacob Bruun Larsen	30	3	16+8	2	0+1	0	1+4	1
Players transferred out during the season
8	MF	(Turkey) TUR	Nuri Şahin	0	0	0	0	0	0	0	0
14	FW	(Sweden) SWE	Alexander Isak	0	0	0	0	0	0	0	0
15	DF	(Germany) GER	Jeremy Toljan	0	0	0	0	0	0	0	0
18	MF	(Germany) GER	Sebastian Rode	0	0	0	0	0	0	0	0
21	FW	(Germany) GER	André Schürrle	0	0	0	0	0	0	0	0
23	MF	(Japan) JPN	Shinji Kagawa	4	0	1+1	0	1	0	0+1	0
32	MF	(Germany) GER	Dženis Burnić	0	0	0	0	0	0	0	0

Last updated: 18 May 2019
Source: Competitions

=== Goalscorers ===
Rank	Pos	No.	Nat	Name	Bundesliga	DFB-Pokal	UEFA CL	Total
1	FW	11	(Germany)	Marco Reus	17	3	1	21
2	FW	9	(Spain)	Paco Alcácer	18	0	1	19
3	FW	7	(England)	Jadon Sancho	12	0	1	13
4	FW	10	(Germany)	Mario Götze	7	0	0	7
4	MF	22	(United States)	Christian Pulisic	4	2	1	7
6	MF	28	(Belgium)	Axel Witsel	4	1	1	6
6	DF	13	(Portugal)	Raphaël Guerreiro	2	0	4	6
8	DF	5	(Morocco)	Achraf Hakimi	2	1	0	3
8	MF	6	(Denmark)	Thomas Delaney	3	0	0	3
8	FW	34	(Denmark)	Jacob Bruun Larsen	2	0	1	3
11	DF	2	(France)	Dan-Axel Zagadou	2	0	0	2
11	FW	20	(Germany)	Maximilian Philipp	1	1	0	2
13	DF	4	(France)	Abdou Diallo	1	0	0	1
13	DF	16	(Switzerland)	Manuel Akanji	1	0	0	1
13	MF	19	(Germany)	Mahmoud Dahoud	1	0	0	1
13	DF	26	(Poland)	Łukasz Piszczek	1	0	0	1
13	FW	27	(Germany)	Marius Wolf	1	0	0	1
13	MF	33	(Germany)	Julian Weigl	1	0	0	1
Own goals					1	0	0	1
Totals					81	8	10	99

Last updated: 18 May 2019
