= 2018–19 UEFA Champions League group stage =

Football tournament

The 2018–19 UEFA Champions League group stage began on 18 September and ended on 12 December 2018. A total of 32 teams competed in the group stage to decide the 16 places in the knockout phase of the 2018–19 UEFA Champions League.

== Draw ==
The draw for the group stage was held on 30 August 2018, 18:00 CEST, at the Grimaldi Forum in Monaco.

The 32 teams were drawn into eight groups of four, with the restriction that teams from the same association could not be drawn against each other. For the draw, the teams were seeded into four pots based on the following principles (Regulations Article 13.06):

- Pot 1 contained the Champions League title holders, the Europa League title holders, and the champions of the top six associations based on their 2017 UEFA country coefficients. If either the Champions League or Europa League title holders were one of the champions of the top six associations, the champions of the association ranked seventh (and possibly eighth) were also seeded into Pot 1.
- Pot 2, 3 and 4 contained the remaining teams, seeded based on their 2018 UEFA club coefficients.

On 17 July 2014, the UEFA emergency panel ruled that Ukrainian and Russian clubs would not be drawn against each other "until further notice" due to the political unrest between the countries.

Moreover, the draw was controlled for teams from the same association in order to split the teams evenly into the two sets of four groups (A–D, E–H) for maximum television coverage. On each matchday, one set of four groups played their matches on Tuesday, while the other set of four groups played their matches on Wednesday, with the two sets of groups alternating between each matchday. The following pairings were announced by UEFA after the group stage teams were confirmed:

- (Spain) Real Madrid and Barcelona
- (Spain) Atlético Madrid and Valencia
- (Germany) Bayern Munich and Borussia Dortmund
- (Germany) Schalke 04 and TSG Hoffenheim
- (England) Manchester City and Tottenham Hotspur
- (England) Manchester United and Liverpool
- (Italy) Juventus and Inter Milan
- (Italy) Napoli and Roma
- (France) Paris Saint-Germain and Lyon
- (Russia) Lokomotiv Moscow and CSKA Moscow
- (Portugal) Porto and Benfica
- (Netherlands) PSV Eindhoven and Ajax

The fixtures were decided after the draw, using a computer draw not shown to public, with the following match sequence (Regulations Article 16.02):

Group stage schedule
Matchday	Dates	Matches (Note: Positions for scheduling did not use the seeding pots, e.g., Team 1 was not necessarily the team from Pot 1 in the draw.)
Matchday 1	18–19 September 2018	2 v 3, 4 v 1
Matchday 2	2–3 October 2018	1 v 2, 3 v 4
Matchday 3	23–24 October 2018	3 v 1, 2 v 4
Matchday 4	6–7 November 2018	1 v 3, 4 v 2
Matchday 5	27–28 November 2018	3 v 2, 1 v 4
Matchday 6	11–12 December 2018	2 v 1, 4 v 3

There were scheduling restrictions: for example, teams from the same city (e.g. Real Madrid and Atlético Madrid) in general were not scheduled to play at home on the same matchday (to avoid them playing at home on the same day or on consecutive days, due to logistics and crowd control), and teams from "winter countries" (e.g. Russia) were not scheduled to play at home on the last matchday (due to cold weather).

== Teams ==
Below were the participating teams (with their 2018 UEFA club coefficients), grouped by their seeding pot. They included:

- 26 teams which entered in this stage
- 6 winners of the play-off round (4 from Champions Path, 2 from League Path)

Key to colours
Group winners and runners-up advanced to round of 16
Third-placed teams entered Europa League round of 32

Pot 1 (by association rank)
Assoc.	Team	Notes	Coeff.
—	(Spain) Real Madrid		162.000
—	(Spain) Atlético Madrid		140.000
1	(Spain) Barcelona		132.000
2	(Germany) Bayern Munich		135.000
3	(England) Manchester City		100.000
4	(Italy) Juventus		126.000
5	(France) Paris Saint-Germain		109.000
6	(Russia) Lokomotiv Moscow		22.500

Pot 2
Team	Notes	Coeff.
(Germany) Borussia Dortmund		89.000
(Portugal) Porto		86.000
(England) Manchester United		82.000
(Ukraine) Shakhtar Donetsk		81.000
(Portugal) Benfica		80.000
(Italy) Napoli		78.000
(England) Tottenham Hotspur		67.000
(Italy) Roma		64.000

Pot 3
Team	Notes	Coeff.
(England) Liverpool		62.000
(Germany) Schalke 04		62.000
(France) Lyon		59.500
(France) Monaco		57.000
(Netherlands) Ajax		53.500
(Russia) CSKA Moscow		45.000
(Netherlands) PSV Eindhoven		36.000
(Spain) Valencia		36.000

Pot 4
Team	Notes	Coeff.
(Czech Republic) Viktoria Plzeň		33.000
(Belgium) Club Brugge		29.500
(Turkey) Galatasaray		29.500
(Switzerland) Young Boys		20.500
(Italy) Inter Milan		16.000
(Germany) TSG Hoffenheim		14.285
(Serbia) Red Star Belgrade		10.750
(Greece) AEK Athens		10.000

Notes

1. ^{TH} Champions League title holders, automatically placed into Pot 1 as top seed.
2. ^{EL} Europa League title holders, automatically placed into Pot 1 as second top seed.
3. ^{CP} Winners of play-off round (Champions Path).
4. ^{LP} Winners of play-off round (League Path).

== Format ==
In each group, teams played against each other home-and-away in a round-robin format. The group winners and runners-up advanced to the round of 16, while the third-placed teams entered the Europa League round of 32.

=== Tiebreakers ===
Teams were ranked according to points (3 points for a win, 1 point for a draw, 0 points for a loss), and if tied on points, the following tiebreaking criteria were applied, in the order given, to determine the rankings (Regulations Articles 17.01):

1. Points in head-to-head matches among tied teams;
2. Goal difference in head-to-head matches among tied teams;
3. Goals scored in head-to-head matches among tied teams;
4. Away goals scored in head-to-head matches among tied teams;
5. If more than two teams were tied, and after applying all head-to-head criteria above, a subset of teams were still tied, all head-to-head criteria above was reapplied exclusively to this subset of teams;
6. Goal difference in all group matches;
7. Goals scored in all group matches;
8. Away goals scored in all group matches;
9. Wins in all group matches;
10. Away wins in all group matches;
11. Disciplinary points (red card = 3 points, yellow card = 1 point, expulsion for two yellow cards in one match = 3 points);
12. UEFA club coefficient.

== Groups ==
The matchdays were 18–19 September, 2–3 October, 23–24 October, 6–7 November, 27–28 November, and 11–12 December 2018. The scheduled kickoff times were 21:00 CET/CEST, with two matches on each Tuesday and Wednesday scheduled for 18:55 CET/CEST.

Times are CET/CEST, (Note: CEST (UTC+2) for dates up to 27 October 2018 (matchdays 1–3), and CET (UTC+1) for dates thereafter (matchdays 4–6).) as listed by UEFA (local times, if different, are in parentheses).

=== Group A ===
Pos	Team	Pld	W	D	L	GF	GA	GD	Pts	Qualification	DOR	ATM	BRU	MON
1	(Germany) Borussia Dortmund	6	4	1	1	10	2	+8	13 (Note: Head-to-head goal difference: Borussia Dortmund +2, Atlético Madrid –2.)	Advance to knockout phase	—	4–0	0–0	3–0
2	(Spain) Atlético Madrid	6	4	1	1	9	6	+3	13	Advance to knockout phase	2–0	—	3–1	2–0
3	(Belgium) Club Brugge	6	1	3	2	6	5	+1	6	Transfer to Europa League	0–1	0–0	—	1–1
4	(France) Monaco	6	0	1	5	2	14	−12	1		0–2	1–2	0–4	—

Source: UEFA
Rules for classification: Group stage tiebreakers
Notes:
18 September 2018
21:00

Club Brugge (Belgium)	0–1	(Germany) Borussia Dortmund
	Report	Pulisic 85'

Jan Breydel Stadium, Bruges
Attendance: 25,181
Referee: Danny Makkelie (Netherlands)
18 September 2018
21:00

Monaco (France)	1–2	(Spain) Atlético Madrid
Grandsir 18'	Report	Costa 31'; Giménez 45+1'

Stade Louis II, Monaco
Attendance: 10,575
Referee: Willie Collum (Scotland)

3 October 2018
21:00

Atlético Madrid (Spain)	3–1	(Belgium) Club Brugge
Griezmann 28', 67'; Koke 90+4'	Report	Danjuma 39'

Metropolitano Stadium, Madrid
Attendance: 55,742
Referee: Ivan Kružliak (Slovakia)
3 October 2018
21:00

Borussia Dortmund (Germany)	3–0	(France) Monaco
Bruun Larsen 51'; Alcácer 72'; Reus 90+2'	Report

Westfalenstadion, Dortmund
Attendance: 66,099
Referee: Aleksei Kulbakov (Belarus)

24 October 2018
18:55

Club Brugge (Belgium)	1–1	(France) Monaco
Wesley 39'	Report	Sylla 31'

Jan Breydel Stadium, Bruges
Attendance: 23,957
Referee: Michael Oliver (England)
24 October 2018
21:00

Borussia Dortmund (Germany)	4–0	(Spain) Atlético Madrid
Witsel 38'; Guerreiro 73', 89'; Sancho 83'	Report

Westfalenstadion, Dortmund
Attendance: 66,099
Referee: Anthony Taylor (England)

6 November 2018
18:55

Monaco (France)	0–4	(Belgium) Club Brugge
	Report	Vanaken 12', 17' (pen.); Wesley 24'; Vormer 85'

Stade Louis II, Monaco
Attendance: 8,347
Referee: Artur Soares Dias (Portugal)
6 November 2018
21:00

Atlético Madrid (Spain)	2–0	(Germany) Borussia Dortmund
Saúl 33'; Griezmann 80'	Report

Metropolitano Stadium, Madrid
Attendance: 61,023
Referee: Daniele Orsato (Italy)

28 November 2018
18:55

Atlético Madrid (Spain)	2–0	(France) Monaco
Koke 2'; Griezmann 24'	Report

Metropolitano Stadium, Madrid
Attendance: 56,314
Referee: Mattias Gestranius (Finland)
28 November 2018
21:00

Borussia Dortmund (Germany)	0–0	(Belgium) Club Brugge
	Report

Westfalenstadion, Dortmund
Attendance: 66,099
Referee: Gediminas Mažeika (Lithuania)

11 December 2018
21:00

Club Brugge (Belgium)	0–0	(Spain) Atlético Madrid
	Report

Jan Breydel Stadium, Bruges
Attendance: 25,645
Referee: Davide Massa (Italy)
11 December 2018
21:00

Monaco (France)	0–2	(Germany) Borussia Dortmund
	Report	Guerreiro 15', 88'

Stade Louis II, Monaco
Attendance: 8,731
Referee: Craig Pawson (England)

=== Group B ===
Pos	Team	Pld	W	D	L	GF	GA	GD	Pts	Qualification	BAR	TOT	INT	PSV
1	(Spain) Barcelona	6	4	2	0	14	5	+9	14	Advance to knockout phase	—	1–1	2–0	4–0
2	(England) Tottenham Hotspur	6	2	2	2	9	10	−1	8 (Note: Head-to-head away goals: Tottenham Hotspur 1, Inter Milan 0.)	Advance to knockout phase	2–4	—	1–0	2–1
3	(Italy) Inter Milan	6	2	2	2	6	7	−1	8	Transfer to Europa League	1–1	2–1	—	1–1
4	(Netherlands) PSV Eindhoven	6	0	2	4	6	13	−7	2		1–2	2–2	1–2	—

Source: UEFA
Rules for classification: Group stage tiebreakers
Notes:
18 September 2018
18:55

Barcelona (Spain)	4–0	(Netherlands) PSV Eindhoven
Messi 32', 77', 87'; Dembélé 75'	Report

Camp Nou, Barcelona
Attendance: 73,462
Referee: Anastasios Sidiropoulos (Greece)
18 September 2018
18:55

Inter Milan (Italy)	2–1	(England) Tottenham Hotspur
Icardi 86'; Vecino 90+2'	Report	Eriksen 53'

San Siro, Milan
Attendance: 64,123
Referee: Clément Turpin (France)

3 October 2018
21:00 (20:00 UTC+1)

Tottenham Hotspur (England)	2–4	(Spain) Barcelona
Kane 52'; Lamela 66'	Report	Coutinho 2'; Rakitić 28'; Messi 56', 90'

Wembley Stadium, London (Note: Tottenham Hotspur played their home matches at Wembley Stadium, London, due to delays with the construction of their new stadium Tottenham Hotspur Stadium, London.)
Attendance: 82,137
Referee: Felix Zwayer (Germany)
3 October 2018
21:00

PSV Eindhoven (Netherlands)	1–2	(Italy) Inter Milan
Rosario 27'	Report	Nainggolan 44'; Icardi 60'

Philips Stadion, Eindhoven
Attendance: 34,750
Referee: Milorad Mažić (Serbia)

24 October 2018
18:55

PSV Eindhoven (Netherlands)	2–2	(England) Tottenham Hotspur
Lozano 30'; De Jong 87'	Report	Lucas 39'; Kane 55'

Philips Stadion, Eindhoven
Attendance: 35,000
Referee: Slavko Vinčić (Slovenia)
24 October 2018
21:00

Barcelona (Spain)	2–0	(Italy) Inter Milan
Rafinha 32'; Alba 83'	Report

Camp Nou, Barcelona
Attendance: 86,290
Referee: Ovidiu Hațegan (Romania)

6 November 2018
21:00 (20:00 UTC+0)

Tottenham Hotspur (England)	2–1	(Netherlands) PSV Eindhoven
Kane 78', 89'	Report	De Jong 2'

Wembley Stadium, London
Attendance: 46,588
Referee: Ivan Kružliak (Slovakia)
6 November 2018
21:00

Inter Milan (Italy)	1–1	(Spain) Barcelona
Icardi 87'	Report	Malcom 83'

San Siro, Milan
Attendance: 70,915
Referee: Szymon Marciniak (Poland)

28 November 2018
21:00

PSV Eindhoven (Netherlands)	1–2	(Spain) Barcelona
De Jong 83'	Report	Messi 61'; Piqué 70'

Philips Stadion, Eindhoven
Attendance: 34,600
Referee: Pavel Královec (Czech Republic)
28 November 2018
21:00 (20:00 UTC+0)

Tottenham Hotspur (England)	1–0	(Italy) Inter Milan
Eriksen 80'	Report

Wembley Stadium, London
Attendance: 57,132
Referee: Cüneyt Çakır (Turkey)

11 December 2018
21:00

Barcelona (Spain)	1–1	(England) Tottenham Hotspur
Dembélé 7'	Report	Lucas 85'

Camp Nou, Barcelona
Attendance: 69,961
Referee: Milorad Mažić (Serbia)
11 December 2018
21:00

Inter Milan (Italy)	1–1	(Netherlands) PSV Eindhoven
Icardi 73'	Report	Lozano 13'

San Siro, Milan
Attendance: 62,533
Referee: Felix Zwayer (Germany)

=== Group C ===
Pos	Team	Pld	W	D	L	GF	GA	GD	Pts	Qualification	PAR	LIV	NAP	RSB
1	(France) Paris Saint-Germain	6	3	2	1	17	9	+8	11	Advance to knockout phase	—	2–1	2–2	6–1
2	(England) Liverpool	6	3	0	3	9	7	+2	9 (Note: Goals in all group matches: Liverpool 9, Napoli 7.)	Advance to knockout phase	3–2	—	1–0	4–0
3	(Italy) Napoli	6	2	3	1	7	5	+2	9	Transfer to Europa League	1–1	1–0	—	3–1
4	(Serbia) Red Star Belgrade	6	1	1	4	5	17	−12	4		1–4	2–0	0–0	—

Source: UEFA
Rules for classification: Group stage tiebreakers
Notes:
18 September 2018
21:00 (20:00 UTC+1)

Liverpool (England)	3–2	(France) Paris Saint-Germain
Sturridge 30'; Milner 36' (pen.); Firmino 90+2'	Report	Meunier 40'; Mbappé 83'

Anfield, Liverpool
Attendance: 52,478
Referee: Cüneyt Çakır (Turkey)
18 September 2018
21:00

Red Star Belgrade (Serbia)	0–0	(Italy) Napoli
	Report

Red Star Stadium, Belgrade
Attendance: 49,112
Referee: Szymon Marciniak (Poland)

3 October 2018
18:55

Paris Saint-Germain (France)	6–1	(Serbia) Red Star Belgrade
Neymar 20', 22', 81'; Cavani 37'; Di María 42'; Mbappé 70'	Report	Marin 74'

Parc des Princes, Paris
Attendance: 39,979
Referee: Artur Soares Dias (Portugal)
3 October 2018
21:00

Napoli (Italy)	1–0	(England) Liverpool
Insigne 90'	Report

Stadio San Paolo, Naples
Attendance: 37,057
Referee: Viktor Kassai (Hungary)

24 October 2018
21:00

Paris Saint-Germain (France)	2–2	(Italy) Napoli
Mário Rui 61' (o.g.); Di María 90+3'	Report	Insigne 29'; Mertens 77'

Parc des Princes, Paris
Attendance: 46,274
Referee: Felix Zwayer (Germany)
24 October 2018
21:00 (20:00 UTC+1)

Liverpool (England)	4–0	(Serbia) Red Star Belgrade
Firmino 20'; Salah 45', 51' (pen.); Mané 80'	Report

Anfield, Liverpool
Attendance: 53,024
Referee: Daniel Siebert (Germany)

6 November 2018
18:55

Red Star Belgrade (Serbia)	2–0	(England) Liverpool
Pavkov 22', 29'	Report

Red Star Stadium, Belgrade
Attendance: 51,318
Referee: Antonio Mateu Lahoz (Spain)
6 November 2018
21:00

Napoli (Italy)	1–1	(France) Paris Saint-Germain
Insigne 63' (pen.)	Report	Bernat 45+2'

Stadio San Paolo, Naples
Attendance: 55,489
Referee: Björn Kuipers (Netherlands)

28 November 2018
21:00

Paris Saint-Germain (France)	2–1	(England) Liverpool
Bernat 13'; Neymar 37'	Report	Milner 45+1' (pen.)

Parc des Princes, Paris
Attendance: 46,880
Referee: Szymon Marciniak (Poland)
28 November 2018
21:00

Napoli (Italy)	3–1	(Serbia) Red Star Belgrade
Hamšík 11'; Mertens 33', 52'	Report	Ben Nabouhane 57'

Stadio San Paolo, Naples
Attendance: 44,470
Referee: Jesús Gil Manzano (Spain)

11 December 2018
21:00 (20:00 UTC+0)

Liverpool (England)	1–0	(Italy) Napoli
Salah 34'	Report

Anfield, Liverpool
Attendance: 52,015
Referee: Damir Skomina (Slovenia)
11 December 2018
21:00

Red Star Belgrade (Serbia)	1–4	(France) Paris Saint-Germain
Gobeljić 56'	Report	Cavani 10'; Neymar 40'; Marquinhos 74'; Mbappé 90+2'

Red Star Stadium, Belgrade
Attendance: 48,357
Referee: Willie Collum (Scotland)

=== Group D ===
Pos	Team	Pld	W	D	L	GF	GA	GD	Pts	Qualification	POR	SCH	GAL	LMO
1	(Portugal) Porto	6	5	1	0	15	6	+9	16	Advance to knockout phase	—	3–1	1–0	4–1
2	(Germany) Schalke 04	6	3	2	1	6	4	+2	11	Advance to knockout phase	1–1	—	2–0	1–0
3	(Turkey) Galatasaray	6	1	1	4	5	8	−3	4	Transfer to Europa League	2–3	0–0	—	3–0
4	(Russia) Lokomotiv Moscow	6	1	0	5	4	12	−8	3		1–3	0–1	2–0	—

Source: UEFA
Rules for classification: Group stage tiebreakers
18 September 2018
21:00 (22:00 UTC+3)

Galatasaray (Turkey)	3–0	(Russia) Lokomotiv Moscow
Rodrigues 9'; Derdiyok 67'; İnan 90+4' (pen.)	Report

Türk Telekom Stadium, Istanbul
Attendance: 43,542
Referee: Gianluca Rocchi (Italy)
18 September 2018
21:00

Schalke 04 (Germany)	1–1	(Portugal) Porto
Embolo 64'	Report	Otávio 75' (pen.)

Arena AufSchalke, Gelsenkirchen
Attendance: 45,755
Referee: Jesús Gil Manzano (Spain)

3 October 2018
18:55 (19:55 UTC+3)

Lokomotiv Moscow (Russia)	0–1	(Germany) Schalke 04
	Report	McKennie 88'

RZD Arena, Moscow
Attendance: 21,471
Referee: Anthony Taylor (England)
3 October 2018
21:00 (20:00 UTC+1)

Porto (Portugal)	1–0	(Turkey) Galatasaray
Marega 49'	Report

Estádio do Dragão, Porto
Attendance: 42,711
Referee: Michael Oliver (England)

24 October 2018
21:00 (22:00 UTC+3)

Lokomotiv Moscow (Russia)	1–3	(Portugal) Porto
An. Miranchuk 38'	Report	Marega 26' (pen.); Herrera 35'; Corona 47'

RZD Arena, Moscow
Attendance: 16,034
Referee: Bobby Madden (Scotland)
24 October 2018
21:00 (22:00 UTC+3)

Galatasaray (Turkey)	0–0	(Germany) Schalke 04
	Report

Türk Telekom Stadium, Istanbul
Attendance: 46,667
Referee: Benoît Bastien (France)

6 November 2018
21:00 (20:00 UTC+0)

Porto (Portugal)	4–1	(Russia) Lokomotiv Moscow
Herrera 2'; Marega 42'; Corona 67'; Otávio 90+3'	Report	Farfán 59'

Estádio do Dragão, Porto
Attendance: 34,616
Referee: Davide Massa (Italy)
6 November 2018
21:00

Schalke 04 (Germany)	2–0	(Turkey) Galatasaray
Burgstaller 4'; Uth 57'	Report

Arena AufSchalke, Gelsenkirchen
Attendance: 54,740
Referee: Willie Collum (Scotland)

28 November 2018
18:55 (20:55 UTC+3)

Lokomotiv Moscow (Russia)	2–0	(Turkey) Galatasaray
Donk 43' (o.g.); Ignatyev 54'	Report

RZD Arena, Moscow
Attendance: 14,037
Referee: Antonio Mateu Lahoz (Spain)
28 November 2018
21:00 (20:00 UTC+0)

Porto (Portugal)	3–1	(Germany) Schalke 04
Militão 52'; Corona 55'; Marega 90+4'	Report	Bentaleb 89' (pen.)

Estádio do Dragão, Porto
Attendance: 41,603
Referee: Ovidiu Hațegan (Romania)

11 December 2018
18:55 (20:55 UTC+3)

Galatasaray (Turkey)	2–3	(Portugal) Porto
Feghouli 45+1' (pen.); Derdiyok 65'	Report	Felipe 17'; Marega 42' (pen.); Oliveira 57'

Türk Telekom Stadium, Istanbul
Attendance: 33,972
Referee: Aleksei Kulbakov (Belarus)
11 December 2018
18:55

Schalke 04 (Germany)	1–0	(Russia) Lokomotiv Moscow
Schöpf 90+1'	Report

Arena AufSchalke, Gelsenkirchen
Attendance: 48,883
Referee: Anastasios Sidiropoulos (Greece)

=== Group E ===
Pos	Team	Pld	W	D	L	GF	GA	GD	Pts	Qualification	BAY	AJX	BEN	AEK
1	(Germany) Bayern Munich	6	4	2	0	15	5	+10	14	Advance to knockout phase	—	1–1	5–1	2–0
2	(Netherlands) Ajax	6	3	3	0	11	5	+6	12	Advance to knockout phase	3–3	—	1–0	3–0
3	(Portugal) Benfica	6	2	1	3	6	11	−5	7	Transfer to Europa League	0–2	1–1	—	1–0
4	(Greece) AEK Athens	6	0	0	6	2	13	−11	0		0–2	0–2	2–3	—

Source: UEFA
Rules for classification: Group stage tiebreakers
19 September 2018
18:55

Ajax (Netherlands)	3–0	(Greece) AEK Athens
Tagliafico 46', 90'; Van de Beek 77'	Report

Johan Cruyff Arena, Amsterdam
Attendance: 52,285
Referee: Carlos del Cerro Grande (Spain)
19 September 2018
21:00 (20:00 UTC+1)

Benfica (Portugal)	0–2	(Germany) Bayern Munich
	Report	Lewandowski 10'; Sanches 54'

Estádio da Luz, Lisbon
Attendance: 60,274
Referee: Antonio Mateu Lahoz (Spain)

2 October 2018
21:00

Bayern Munich (Germany)	1–1	(Netherlands) Ajax
Hummels 4'	Report	Mazraoui 22'

Allianz Arena, Munich
Attendance: 70,000
Referee: Pavel Královec (Czech Republic)
2 October 2018
21:00 (22:00 UTC+3)

AEK Athens (Greece)	2–3	(Portugal) Benfica
Klonaridis 53', 63'	Report	Seferovic 6'; Grimaldo 15'; Semedo 74'

Olympic Stadium, Athens
Attendance: 31,154
Referee: Orel Grinfeld (Israel)

23 October 2018
18:55 (19:55 UTC+3)

AEK Athens (Greece)	0–2	(Germany) Bayern Munich
	Report	Martínez 61'; Lewandowski 63'

Olympic Stadium, Athens
Attendance: 61,221
Referee: Aleksei Kulbakov (Belarus)
23 October 2018
21:00

Ajax (Netherlands)	1–0	(Portugal) Benfica
Mazraoui 90+2'	Report

Johan Cruyff Arena, Amsterdam
Attendance: 52,489
Referee: Ruddy Buquet (France)

7 November 2018
21:00

Bayern Munich (Germany)	2–0	(Greece) AEK Athens
Lewandowski 31' (pen.), 71'	Report

Allianz Arena, Munich
Attendance: 70,000
Referee: Matej Jug (Slovenia)
7 November 2018
21:00 (20:00 UTC+0)

Benfica (Portugal)	1–1	(Netherlands) Ajax
Jonas 29'	Report	Tadić 61'

Estádio da Luz, Lisbon
Attendance: 51,328
Referee: Gianluca Rocchi (Italy)

27 November 2018
18:55 (19:55 UTC+2)

AEK Athens (Greece)	0–2	(Netherlands) Ajax
	Report	Tadić 68' (pen.), 72'

Olympic Stadium, Athens
Attendance: 25,756
Referee: Michael Oliver (England)
27 November 2018
21:00

Bayern Munich (Germany)	5–1	(Portugal) Benfica
Robben 13', 30'; Lewandowski 36', 51'; Ribéry 76'	Report	Fernandes 46'

Allianz Arena, Munich
Attendance: 70,000
Referee: Daniele Orsato (Italy)

12 December 2018
21:00

Ajax (Netherlands)	3–3	(Germany) Bayern Munich
Tadić 61', 82' (pen.); Tagliafico 90+5'	Report	Lewandowski 13', 87' (pen.); Coman 90'

Johan Cruyff Arena, Amsterdam
Attendance: 52,244
Referee: Clément Turpin (France)
12 December 2018
21:00 (20:00 UTC+0)

Benfica (Portugal)	1–0	(Greece) AEK Athens
Grimaldo 88'	Report

Estádio da Luz, Lisbon
Attendance: 33,633
Referee: Bobby Madden (Scotland)

=== Group F ===
Pos	Team	Pld	W	D	L	GF	GA	GD	Pts	Qualification	MCI	LYO	SHK	HOF
1	(England) Manchester City	6	4	1	1	16	6	+10	13	Advance to knockout phase	—	1–2	6–0	2–1
2	(France) Lyon	6	1	5	0	12	11	+1	8	Advance to knockout phase	2–2	—	2–2	2–2
3	(Ukraine) Shakhtar Donetsk	6	1	3	2	8	16	−8	6	Transfer to Europa League	0–3	1–1	—	2–2
4	(Germany) TSG Hoffenheim	6	0	3	3	11	14	−3	3		1–2	3–3	2–3	—

Source: UEFA
Rules for classification: Group stage tiebreakers
19 September 2018
18:55 (19:55 UTC+3)

Shakhtar Donetsk (Ukraine)	2–2	(Germany) TSG Hoffenheim
Ismaily 27'; Maycon 81'	Report	Grillitsch 6'; Nordtveit 38'

Metalist Stadium, Kharkiv (Note: Shakhtar Donetsk played their first two home matches at Metalist Stadium, Kharkiv, instead of their regular stadium, the Donbas Arena in Donetsk, due to the war in Donbas.)
Attendance: 28,336
Referee: Jakob Kehlet (Denmark)
19 September 2018
21:00 (20:00 UTC+1)

Manchester City (England)	1–2	(France) Lyon
B. Silva 67'	Report	Cornet 26'; Fekir 43'

City of Manchester Stadium, Manchester
Attendance: 40,111
Referee: Daniele Orsato (Italy)

2 October 2018
18:55

TSG Hoffenheim (Germany)	1–2	(England) Manchester City
Belfodil 1'	Report	Agüero 8'; D. Silva 87'

Rhein-Neckar-Arena, Sinsheim
Attendance: 24,851
Referee: Damir Skomina (Slovenia)
2 October 2018
21:00

Lyon (France)	2–2	(Ukraine) Shakhtar Donetsk
Dembélé 70'; Dubois 72'	Report	Júnior Moraes 44', 55'

Parc Olympique Lyonnais, Décines-Charpieu
Attendance: 0 (Note: The Lyon v Shakhtar Donetsk match was played behind closed doors as UEFA punishment for crowd disorder at Lyon matches during the 2017–18 UEFA Europa League.)
Referee: Andris Treimanis (Latvia)

23 October 2018
21:00

TSG Hoffenheim (Germany)	3–3	(France) Lyon
Kramarić 33', 47'; Joelinton 90+2'	Report	Traoré 27'; Ndombele 59'; Depay 67'

Rhein-Neckar-Arena, Sinsheim
Attendance: 24,144
Referee: Alberto Undiano Mallenco (Spain)
23 October 2018
21:00 (22:00 UTC+3)

Shakhtar Donetsk (Ukraine)	0–3	(England) Manchester City
	Report	D. Silva 30'; Laporte 35'; B. Silva 71'

Metalist Stadium, Kharkiv
Attendance: 37,106
Referee: Carlos del Cerro Grande (Spain)

7 November 2018
21:00

Lyon (France)	2–2	(Germany) TSG Hoffenheim
Fekir 19'; Ndombele 28'	Report	Kramarić 65'; Kadeřábek 90+2'

Parc Olympique Lyonnais, Décines-Charpieu
Attendance: 53,850
Referee: Danny Makkelie (Netherlands)
7 November 2018
21:00 (20:00 UTC+0)

Manchester City (England)	6–0	(Ukraine) Shakhtar Donetsk
D. Silva 13'; Gabriel Jesus 24' (pen.), 72' (pen.), 90+2'; Sterling 49'; Mahrez 84'	Report

City of Manchester Stadium, Manchester
Attendance: 52,286
Referee: Viktor Kassai (Hungary)

27 November 2018
21:00

TSG Hoffenheim (Germany)	2–3	(Ukraine) Shakhtar Donetsk
Kramarić 17'; Zuber 40'	Report	Ismaily 14'; Taison 15', 90+2'

Rhein-Neckar-Arena, Sinsheim
Attendance: 22,920
Referee: Ivan Kružliak (Slovakia)
27 November 2018
21:00

Lyon (France)	2–2	(England) Manchester City
Cornet 55', 81'	Report	Laporte 62'; Agüero 83'

Parc Olympique Lyonnais, Décines-Charpieu
Attendance: 56,039
Referee: Gianluca Rocchi (Italy)

12 December 2018
21:00 (22:00 UTC+2)

Shakhtar Donetsk (Ukraine)	1–1	(France) Lyon
Júnior Moraes 22'	Report	Fekir 65'

Olympic Stadium, Kyiv (Note: Shakhtar Donetsk played this match at NSC Olimpiyskiy Stadium, Kyiv, instead of their temporary stadium Metalist Stadium, Kharkiv, due to martial law being declared in parts of Ukraine.)
Attendance: 38,916
Referee: Björn Kuipers (Netherlands)
12 December 2018
21:00 (20:00 UTC+0)

Manchester City (England)	2–1	(Germany) TSG Hoffenheim
Sané 45+1', 61'	Report	Kramarić 16' (pen.)

City of Manchester Stadium, Manchester
Attendance: 50,411
Referee: Andreas Ekberg (Sweden)

=== Group G ===
Pos	Team	Pld	W	D	L	GF	GA	GD	Pts	Qualification	RMA	ROM	PLZ	CSKA
1	(Spain) Real Madrid	6	4	0	2	12	5	+7	12	Advance to knockout phase	—	3–0	2–1	0–3
2	(Italy) Roma	6	3	0	3	11	8	+3	9	Advance to knockout phase	0–2	—	5–0	3–0
3	(Czech Republic) Viktoria Plzeň	6	2	1	3	7	16	−9	7 (Note: Head-to-head points: Viktoria Plzeň 4, CSKA Moscow 1.)	Transfer to Europa League	0–5	2–1	—	2–2
4	(Russia) CSKA Moscow	6	2	1	3	8	9	−1	7		1–0	1–2	1–2	—

Source: UEFA
Rules for classification: Group stage tiebreakers
Notes:
19 September 2018
21:00

Real Madrid (Spain)	3–0	(Italy) Roma
Isco 45'; Bale 58'; Mariano 90+1'	Report

Santiago Bernabéu, Madrid
Attendance: 69,251
Referee: Björn Kuipers (Netherlands)
19 September 2018
21:00

Viktoria Plzeň (Czech Republic)	2–2	(Russia) CSKA Moscow
Krmenčík 29', 41'	Report	Chalov 49'; Vlašić 90+5' (pen.)

Doosan Arena, Plzeň
Attendance: 11,312
Referee: Benoît Bastien (France)

2 October 2018
21:00 (22:00 UTC+3)

CSKA Moscow (Russia)	1–0	(Spain) Real Madrid
Vlašić 2'	Report

Luzhniki Stadium, Moscow (Note: CSKA Moscow played their home matches at Luzhniki Stadium, Moscow, instead of their regular stadium VEB Arena, Moscow.)
Attendance: 71,811
Referee: Ovidiu Hațegan (Romania)
2 October 2018
21:00

Roma (Italy)	5–0	(Czech Republic) Viktoria Plzeň
Džeko 3', 40', 90+2'; Ünder 64'; Kluivert 73'	Report

Stadio Olimpico, Rome
Attendance: 41,243
Referee: Paweł Raczkowski (Poland)

23 October 2018
21:00

Roma (Italy)	3–0	(Russia) CSKA Moscow
Džeko 30', 43'; Ünder 50'	Report

Stadio Olimpico, Rome
Attendance: 46,005
Referee: Anastasios Sidiropoulos (Greece)
23 October 2018
21:00

Real Madrid (Spain)	2–1	(Czech Republic) Viktoria Plzeň
Benzema 11'; Marcelo 55'	Report	Hrošovský 79'

Santiago Bernabéu, Madrid
Attendance: 67,356
Referee: Orel Grinfeld (Israel)

7 November 2018
18:55 (20:55 UTC+3)

CSKA Moscow (Russia)	1–2	(Italy) Roma
Sigurðsson 50'	Report	Manolas 4'; Lo. Pellegrini 59'

Luzhniki Stadium, Moscow
Attendance: 64,454
Referee: Cüneyt Çakır (Turkey)
7 November 2018
21:00

Viktoria Plzeň (Czech Republic)	0–5	(Spain) Real Madrid
	Report	Benzema 21', 37'; Casemiro 23'; Bale 40'; Kroos 67'

Doosan Arena, Plzeň
Attendance: 11,483
Referee: Deniz Aytekin (Germany)

27 November 2018
18:55 (20:55 UTC+3)

CSKA Moscow (Russia)	1–2	(Czech Republic) Viktoria Plzeň
Vlašić 10' (pen.)	Report	Procházka 56'; Hejda 81'

Luzhniki Stadium, Moscow
Attendance: 52,892
Referee: Danny Makkelie (Netherlands)
27 November 2018
21:00

Roma (Italy)	0–2	(Spain) Real Madrid
	Report	Bale 47'; Vázquez 59'

Stadio Olimpico, Rome
Attendance: 59,124
Referee: Clément Turpin (France)

12 December 2018
18:55

Real Madrid (Spain)	0–3	(Russia) CSKA Moscow
	Report	Chalov 37'; Shchennikov 43'; Sigurðsson 73'

Santiago Bernabéu, Madrid
Attendance: 51,636
Referee: Artur Soares Dias (Portugal)
12 December 2018
18:55

Viktoria Plzeň (Czech Republic)	2–1	(Italy) Roma
Kovařík 62'; Chorý 72'	Report	Ünder 68'

Doosan Arena, Plzeň
Attendance: 11,217
Referee: Anthony Taylor (England)

=== Group H ===
Pos	Team	Pld	W	D	L	GF	GA	GD	Pts	Qualification	JUV	MUN	VAL	YB
1	(Italy) Juventus	6	4	0	2	9	4	+5	12	Advance to knockout phase	—	1–2	1–0	3–0
2	(England) Manchester United	6	3	1	2	7	4	+3	10	Advance to knockout phase	0–1	—	0–0	1–0
3	(Spain) Valencia	6	2	2	2	6	6	0	8	Transfer to Europa League	0–2	2–1	—	3–1
4	(Switzerland) Young Boys	6	1	1	4	4	12	−8	4		2–1	0–3	1–1	—

Source: UEFA
Rules for classification: Group stage tiebreakers
19 September 2018
21:00

Young Boys (Switzerland)	0–3	(England) Manchester United
	Report	Pogba 35', 44' (pen.); Martial 66'

Stade de Suisse, Bern
Attendance: 31,120
Referee: Deniz Aytekin (Germany)
19 September 2018
21:00

Valencia (Spain)	0–2	(Italy) Juventus
	Report	Pjanić 45' (pen.), 51' (pen.)

Mestalla, Valencia
Attendance: 46,067
Referee: Felix Brych (Germany)

2 October 2018
18:55

Juventus (Italy)	3–0	(Switzerland) Young Boys
Dybala 5', 33', 69'	Report

Juventus Stadium, Turin
Attendance: 40,961
Referee: Sergei Karasev (Russia)
2 October 2018
21:05 (20:05 UTC+1) (Note: The Manchester United v Valencia match, originally scheduled for 21:00 (20:00 UTC+1), was delayed to 21:05 (20:05 UTC+1) due to late team arrival caused by heavy traffic.)

Manchester United (England)	0–0	(Spain) Valencia
	Report

Old Trafford, Manchester
Attendance: 73,569
Referee: Slavko Vinčić (Slovenia)

23 October 2018
18:55

Young Boys (Switzerland)	1–1	(Spain) Valencia
Hoarau 55' (pen.)	Report	Batshuayi 26'

Stade de Suisse, Bern
Attendance: 31,120
Referee: Andris Treimanis (Latvia)
23 October 2018
21:00 (20:00 UTC+1)

Manchester United (England)	0–1	(Italy) Juventus
	Report	Dybala 17'

Old Trafford, Manchester
Attendance: 73,946
Referee: Milorad Mažić (Serbia)

7 November 2018
18:55

Valencia (Spain)	3–1	(Switzerland) Young Boys
Mina 14', 42'; Soler 56'	Report	Assalé 37'

Mestalla, Valencia
Attendance: 36,480
Referee: István Kovács (Romania)
7 November 2018
21:00

Juventus (Italy)	1–2	(England) Manchester United
Ronaldo 65'	Report	Mata 86'; Bonucci 90' (o.g.)

Juventus Stadium, Turin
Attendance: 41,470
Referee: Ovidiu Hațegan (Romania)

27 November 2018
21:00 (20:00 UTC+0)

Manchester United (England)	1–0	(Switzerland) Young Boys
Fellaini 90+1'	Report

Old Trafford, Manchester
Attendance: 72,876
Referee: Felix Brych (Germany)
27 November 2018
21:00

Juventus (Italy)	1–0	(Spain) Valencia
Mandžukić 59'	Report

Juventus Stadium, Turin
Attendance: 39,070
Referee: Willie Collum (Scotland)

12 December 2018
21:00

Young Boys (Switzerland)	2–1	(Italy) Juventus
Hoarau 30' (pen.), 68'	Report	Dybala 80'

Stade de Suisse, Bern
Attendance: 30,114
Referee: Tobias Stieler (Germany)
12 December 2018
21:00

Valencia (Spain)	2–1	(England) Manchester United
Soler 17'; Jones 47' (o.g.)	Report	Rashford 87'

Mestalla, Valencia
Attendance: 36,544
Referee: Georgi Kabakov (Bulgaria)
