= 2018–19 UEFA Champions League knockout phase =

The 2018–19 UEFA Champions League knockout phase began on 12 February and ended on 1 June 2019 with the final at the Estadio Metropolitano in Madrid, Spain, to decide the champions of the 2018–19 UEFA Champions League. A total of 16 teams competed in the knockout phase.

For the first time, the video assistant referee (VAR) system was used in the Champions League knockout phase.

Times are CET/CEST, (Note: CET (UTC+1) for dates up to 30 March 2019 (round of 16), and CEST (UTC+2) for dates thereafter (quarter-finals, semi-finals and final).) as listed by UEFA (local times, if different, are in parentheses).

== Round and draw dates ==
The schedule was as follows (all draws were held at the UEFA headquarters in Nyon, Switzerland).

Round	Draw date	First leg	Second leg
Round of 16	17 December 2018, 12:00	12–13 & 19–20 February 2019	5–6 & 12–13 March 2019
Quarter-finals	15 March 2019, 12:00	9–10 April 2019	16–17 April 2019
Semi-finals	15 March 2019, 12:00	30 April – 1 May 2019	7–8 May 2019
Final	15 March 2019, 12:00	1 June 2019 at Estadio Metropolitano, Madrid	

== Format ==
Each tie in the knockout phase, apart from the final, was played over two legs, with each team playing one leg at home. The team that scored more goals on aggregate over the two legs advanced to the next round. If the aggregate score was level, the away goals rule was applied, i.e. the team that scored more goals away from home over the two legs advanced. If away goals were also equal, then extra time was played. The away goals rule was again applied after extra time, i.e. if there were goals scored during extra time and the aggregate score was still level, the visiting team advanced under more away goals scored. If no goals were scored during extra time, the winners were decided by a penalty shoot-out. In the final, which was played as a single match, if the score was level at the end of normal time, extra time was played, followed by a penalty shoot-out if the score was still level. The mechanism of the draws for each round was as follows:

- In the draw for the round of 16, the eight group winners were seeded, and the eight group runners-up were unseeded. The seeded teams were drawn against the unseeded teams, with the seeded teams hosting the second leg. Teams from the same group or the same association cannot be drawn against each other.
- In the draws for the quarter-finals onwards, there were no seedings, and teams from the same group or the same association could be drawn against each other. As the draws for the quarter-finals and semi-finals were held together before the quarter-finals were played, the identity of the quarter-final winners was not known at the time of the semi-final draw. A draw was also held to determine which semi-final winner was designated as the "home" team for the final (for administrative purposes as it was played at a neutral venue).

For the quarter-finals and semi-finals, teams from the same city (e.g., Manchester City and Manchester United) were not scheduled to play at home on the same day or consecutive days, due to logistics and crowd control. To avoid such scheduling conflict, if the two teams were drawn to play at home for the same leg, the order of legs of the tie involving the team which was not titleholders of Champions League or Europa League (or lower-tier, if both were continental titleholders), or the team with the lower domestic ranking in the qualifying season (if neither team were continental title holder, e.g. Manchester United for this season) was reversed from the original draw.

== Qualified teams ==
The knockout phase involved the 16 teams which qualified as winners and runners-up of each of the eight groups in the group stage.

Group	Winners (seeded in round of 16 draw)	Runners-up (unseeded in round of 16 draw)
A	(Germany) Borussia Dortmund	(Spain) Atlético Madrid
B	(Spain) Barcelona	(England) Tottenham Hotspur
C	(France) Paris Saint-Germain	(England) Liverpool
D	(Portugal) Porto	(Germany) Schalke 04
E	(Germany) Bayern Munich	(Netherlands) Ajax
F	(England) Manchester City	(France) Lyon
G	(Spain) Real Madrid	(Italy) Roma
H	(Italy) Juventus	(England) Manchester United

== Bracket ==
Round of 16
(England) Tottenham Hotspur	3	1	4
(Germany) Borussia Dortmund	0	0	0
(Germany) Schalke 04	2	0	2
(England) Manchester City	3	7	10
(Netherlands) Ajax	1	4	5
(Spain) Real Madrid	2	1	3
(Spain) Atlético Madrid	2	0	2
(Italy) Juventus	0	3	3
(England) Manchester United (a)	0	3	3
(France) Paris Saint-Germain	2	1	3
(France) Lyon	0	1	1
(Spain) Barcelona	0	5	5
(England) Liverpool	0	3	3
(Germany) Bayern Munich	0	1	1
(Italy) Roma	2	1	3
(Portugal) Porto (a.e.t.)	1	3	4

Quarter-finals
(England) Tottenham Hotspur (a)	1	3	4
(England) Manchester City	0	4	4
(Netherlands) Ajax	1	2	3
(Italy) Juventus	1	1	2
(England) Manchester United	0	0	0
(Spain) Barcelona	1	3	4
(England) Liverpool	2	4	6
(Portugal) Porto	0	1	1

Semi-finals
(England) Tottenham Hotspur (a)	0	3	3
(Netherlands) Ajax	1	2	3
(Spain) Barcelona	3	0	3
(England) Liverpool	0	4	4

Final
1 June – Madrid
(England) Tottenham Hotspur	0
(England) Liverpool	2

== Round of 16 ==
The draw for the round of 16 was held on 17 December 2018, 12:00 CET.

Manchester United became the first team in UEFA Champions League history to advance after losing at home by two goals or more in the first leg. Including the European Cup era, only Ajax managed this feat, winning a play-off match they forced in the 1968–69 European Cup quarter-finals against Benfica after losing 1–3 in the first leg at home and winning 3–1 in the second leg away.

=== Summary ===
The first legs were played on 12, 13, 19 and 20 February, and the second legs were played on 5, 6, 12 and 13 March 2019.

Team 1	Agg.	Team 2	1st leg	2nd leg
Schalke 04 (Germany)	2–10	(England) Manchester City	2–3	0–7
Atlético Madrid (Spain)	2–3	(Italy) Juventus	2–0	0–3
Manchester United (England)	3–3 (a)	(France) Paris Saint-Germain	0–2	3–1
Tottenham Hotspur (England)	4–0	(Germany) Borussia Dortmund	3–0	1–0
Lyon (France)	1–5	(Spain) Barcelona	0–0	1–5
Roma (Italy)	3–4	(Portugal) Porto	2–1	1–3 (a.e.t.)
Ajax (Netherlands)	5–3	(Spain) Real Madrid	1–2	4–1
Liverpool (England)	3–1	(Germany) Bayern Munich	0–0	3–1

=== Matches ===
20 February 2019
21:00

Schalke 04 (Germany)	2–3	(England) Manchester City
Bentaleb 38' (pen.), 45' (pen.)	Report	Agüero 18'; Sané 85'; Sterling 90'

Arena AufSchalke, Gelsenkirchen
Attendance: 54,417
Referee: Carlos del Cerro Grande (Spain)
12 March 2019
21:00 (20:00 UTC+0)

Manchester City (England)	7–0	(Germany) Schalke 04
Agüero 35' (pen.), 38'; Sané 42'; Sterling 56'; B. Silva 71'; Foden 78'; Gabriel Jesus 84'	Report

City of Manchester Stadium, Manchester
Attendance: 51,518
Referee: Clément Turpin (France)

Manchester City won 10–2 on aggregate.

20 February 2019
21:00

Atlético Madrid (Spain)	2–0	(Italy) Juventus
Giménez 78'; Godín 83'	Report

Metropolitano Stadium, Madrid
Attendance: 67,193
Referee: Felix Zwayer (Germany)
12 March 2019
21:00

Juventus (Italy)	3–0	(Spain) Atlético Madrid
Ronaldo 27', 48', 86' (pen.)	Report

Juventus Stadium, Turin
Attendance: 40,884
Referee: Björn Kuipers (Netherlands)

Juventus won 3–2 on aggregate.

12 February 2019
21:00 (20:00 UTC+0)

Manchester United (England)	0–2	(France) Paris Saint-Germain
	Report	Kimpembe 53'; Mbappé 60'

Old Trafford, Manchester
Attendance: 74,054
Referee: Daniele Orsato (Italy)
6 March 2019
21:00

Paris Saint-Germain (France)	1–3	(England) Manchester United
Bernat 12'	Report	Lukaku 2', 30'; Rashford 90+4' (pen.)

Parc des Princes, Paris
Attendance: 47,441
Referee: Damir Skomina (Slovenia)

3–3 on aggregate; Manchester United won on away goals.

13 February 2019
21:00 (20:00 UTC+0)

Tottenham Hotspur (England)	3–0	(Germany) Borussia Dortmund
Son Heung-min 47'; Vertonghen 83'; Llorente 86'	Report

Wembley Stadium, London (Note: Tottenham Hotspur played their round of 16 home match at Wembley Stadium, London, instead of their home Tottenham Hotspur Stadium, London, due to delays with the construction of their new stadium.)
Attendance: 71,214
Referee: Antonio Mateu Lahoz (Spain)
5 March 2019
21:00

Borussia Dortmund (Germany)	0–1	(England) Tottenham Hotspur
	Report	Kane 49'

Westfalenstadion, Dortmund
Attendance: 66,099
Referee: Danny Makkelie (Netherlands)

Tottenham Hotspur won 4–0 on aggregate.

19 February 2019
21:00

Lyon (France)	0–0	(Spain) Barcelona
	Report

Parc Olympique Lyonnais, Décines-Charpieu
Attendance: 57,889
Referee: Cüneyt Çakır (Turkey)
13 March 2019
21:00

Barcelona (Spain)	5–1	(France) Lyon
Messi 18' (pen.), 78'; Coutinho 31'; Piqué 81'; Dembélé 86'	Report	Tousart 58'

Camp Nou, Barcelona
Attendance: 92,346
Referee: Szymon Marciniak (Poland)

Barcelona won 5–1 on aggregate.

12 February 2019
21:00

Roma (Italy)	2–1	(Portugal) Porto
Zaniolo 70', 76'	Report	Adrián 79'

Stadio Olimpico, Rome
Attendance: 51,727
Referee: Danny Makkelie (Netherlands)
6 March 2019
21:00 (20:00 UTC+0)

Porto (Portugal)	3–1 (a.e.t.)	(Italy) Roma
Soares 26'; Marega 52'; Telles 117' (pen.)	Report	De Rossi 37' (pen.)

Estádio do Dragão, Porto
Attendance: 49,029
Referee: Cüneyt Çakır (Turkey)

Porto won 4–3 on aggregate.

13 February 2019
21:00

Ajax (Netherlands)	1–2	(Spain) Real Madrid
Ziyech 75'	Report	Benzema 60'; Asensio 87'

Johan Cruyff Arena, Amsterdam
Attendance: 52,286
Referee: Damir Skomina (Slovenia)
5 March 2019
21:00

Real Madrid (Spain)	1–4	(Netherlands) Ajax
Asensio 70'	Report	Ziyech 7'; Neres 18'; Tadić 62'; Schöne 72'

Santiago Bernabéu, Madrid
Attendance: 77,013
Referee: Felix Brych (Germany)

Ajax won 5–3 on aggregate.

19 February 2019
21:00 (20:00 UTC+0)

Liverpool (England)	0–0	(Germany) Bayern Munich
	Report

Anfield, Liverpool
Attendance: 52,250
Referee: Gianluca Rocchi (Italy)
13 March 2019
21:00

Bayern Munich (Germany)	1–3	(England) Liverpool
Matip 39' (o.g.)	Report	Mané 26', 84'; Van Dijk 69'

Allianz Arena, Munich
Attendance: 68,145
Referee: Daniele Orsato (Italy)

Liverpool won 3–1 on aggregate.

== Quarter-finals ==
The draw for the quarter-finals was held on 15 March 2019, 12:00 CET.

=== Summary ===
The first legs were played on 9 and 10 April, and the second legs were played on 16 and 17 April 2019.

Team 1	Agg.	Team 2	1st leg	2nd leg
Ajax (Netherlands)	3–2	(Italy) Juventus	1–1	2–1
Liverpool (England)	6–1	(Portugal) Porto	2–0	4–1
Tottenham Hotspur (England)	4–4 (a)	(England) Manchester City	1–0	3–4
Manchester United (England)	0–4 (Note: Order of legs reversed after original draw, in order to avoid a scheduling conflict with the Manchester City v Tottenham Hotspur match in the same city.)	(Spain) Barcelona	0–1	0–3

=== Matches ===
10 April 2019
21:00

Ajax (Netherlands)	1–1	(Italy) Juventus
Neres 46'	Report	Ronaldo 45'

Johan Cruyff Arena, Amsterdam
Attendance: 50,390
Referee: Carlos del Cerro Grande (Spain)
16 April 2019
21:00

Juventus (Italy)	1–2	(Netherlands) Ajax
Ronaldo 28'	Report	Van de Beek 34'; De Ligt 67'

Juventus Stadium, Turin
Attendance: 41,445
Referee: Clément Turpin (France)

Ajax won 3–2 on aggregate.

9 April 2019
21:00 (20:00 UTC+1)

Liverpool (England)	2–0	(Portugal) Porto
Keïta 5'; Firmino 26'	Report

Anfield, Liverpool
Attendance: 52,465
Referee: Antonio Mateu Lahoz (Spain)
17 April 2019
21:00 (20:00 UTC+1)

Porto (Portugal)	1–4	(England) Liverpool
Militão 69'	Report	Mané 26'; Salah 65'; Firmino 77'; Van Dijk 84'

Estádio do Dragão, Porto
Attendance: 49,117
Referee: Danny Makkelie (Netherlands)

Liverpool won 6–1 on aggregate.

9 April 2019
21:00 (20:00 UTC+1)

Tottenham Hotspur (England)	1–0	(England) Manchester City
Son Heung-min 78'	Report

Tottenham Hotspur Stadium, London
Attendance: 60,044
Referee: Björn Kuipers (Netherlands)
17 April 2019
21:00 (20:00 UTC+1)

Manchester City (England)	4–3	(England) Tottenham Hotspur
Sterling 4', 21'; B. Silva 11'; Agüero 59'	Report	Son Heung-min 7', 10'; Llorente 73'

City of Manchester Stadium, Manchester
Attendance: 53,348
Referee: Cüneyt Çakır (Turkey)

4–4 on aggregate; Tottenham Hotspur won on away goals.

10 April 2019
21:00 (20:00 UTC+1)

Manchester United (England)	0–1	(Spain) Barcelona
	Report	Shaw 12' (o.g.)

Old Trafford, Manchester
Attendance: 74,093
Referee: Gianluca Rocchi (Italy)
16 April 2019
21:00

Barcelona (Spain)	3–0	(England) Manchester United
Messi 16', 20'; Coutinho 61'	Report

Camp Nou, Barcelona
Attendance: 96,708
Referee: Felix Brych (Germany)

Barcelona won 4–0 on aggregate.

== Semi-finals ==
The draw for the semi-finals was held on 15 March 2019, 12:00 CET (after the quarter-final draw). Both semi-finals are considered to be among the best comebacks in UEFA Champions League history.

=== Summary ===
The first legs were played on 30 April and 1 May, and the second legs were played on 7 and 8 May 2019.

Team 1	Agg.	Team 2	1st leg	2nd leg
Tottenham Hotspur (England)	3–3 (a)	(Netherlands) Ajax	0–1	3–2
Barcelona (Spain)	3–4	(England) Liverpool	3–0	0–4

=== Matches ===
30 April 2019
21:00 (20:00 UTC+1)

Tottenham Hotspur (England)	0–1	(Netherlands) Ajax
	Report	Van de Beek 15'

Tottenham Hotspur Stadium, London
Attendance: 60,243
Referee: Antonio Mateu Lahoz (Spain)
8 May 2019
21:00

Ajax (Netherlands)	2–3	(England) Tottenham Hotspur
De Ligt 5'; Ziyech 35'	Report	Lucas 55', 59', 90+6'

Johan Cruyff Arena, Amsterdam
Attendance: 52,641
Referee: Felix Brych (Germany)

3–3 on aggregate; Tottenham Hotspur won on away goals.

1 May 2019
21:00

Barcelona (Spain)	3–0	(England) Liverpool
Suárez 26'; Messi 75', 82'	Report

Camp Nou, Barcelona
Attendance: 98,299
Referee: Björn Kuipers (Netherlands)
7 May 2019
21:00 (20:00 UTC+1)

Liverpool (England)	4–0	(Spain) Barcelona
Origi 7', 79'; Wijnaldum 54', 56'	Report

Anfield, Liverpool
Attendance: 52,212
Referee: Cüneyt Çakır (Turkey)

Liverpool won 4–3 on aggregate.

== Final ==
The final was played on 1 June 2019 at the Estadio Metropolitano in Madrid. The nominal home team (for administrative purposes) was determined by an additional draw held after the quarter-final and semi-final draws.

1 June 2019
21:00

Tottenham Hotspur (England)	0–2	(England) Liverpool
	Report	Salah 2' (pen.); Origi 87'

Estadio Metropolitano, Madrid
Attendance: 63,272
Referee: Damir Skomina (Slovenia)
