= 1962–63 European Cup Winners' Cup =

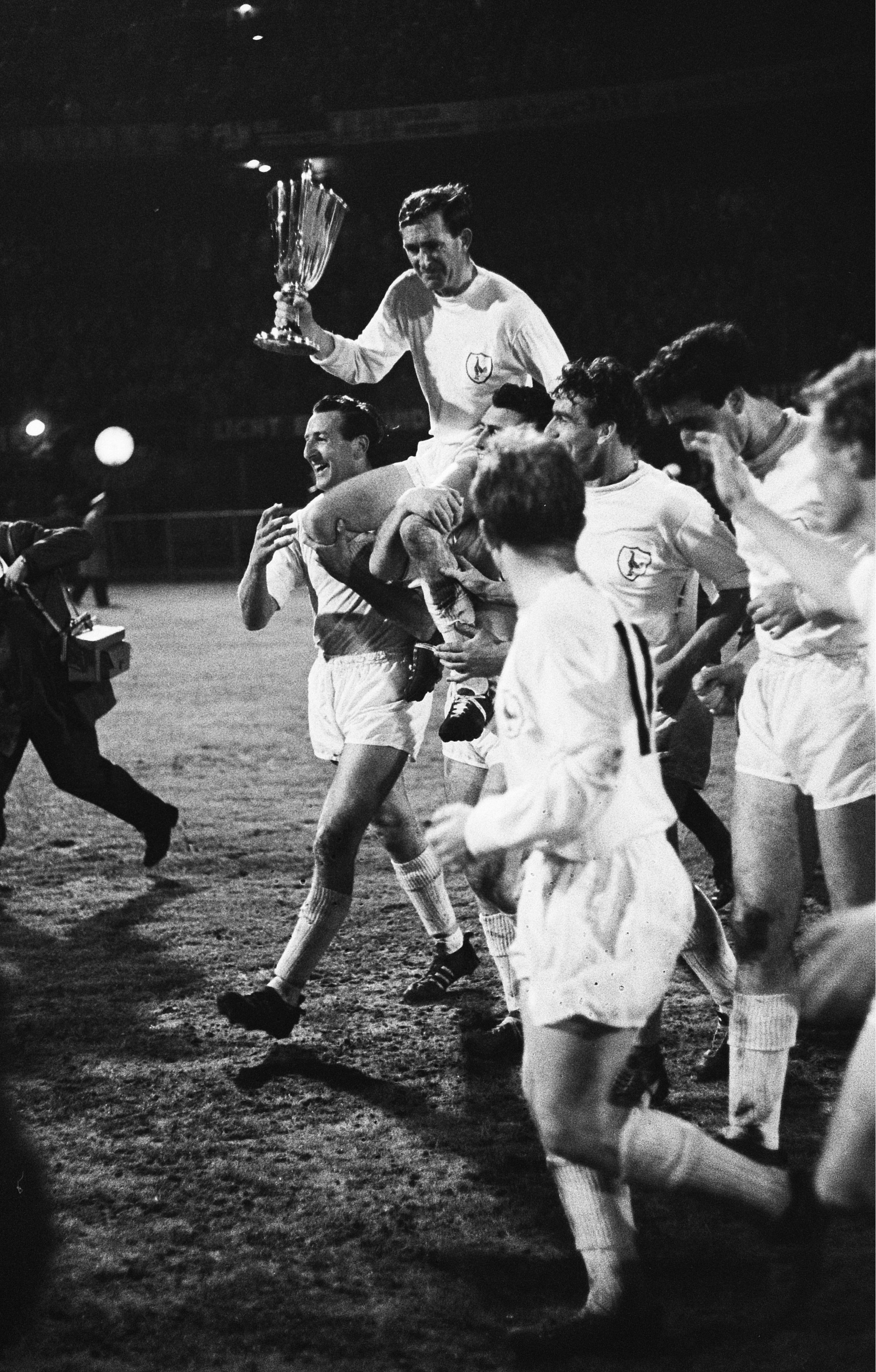
- Spurs captain Danny Blanchflower holding the UEFA Cup Winners' Cup trophy

Final positions
- Champions: (England) Tottenham Hotspur (1st title)
- Runners-up: (Spain) Atlético Madrid

Tournament statistics
- Matches played: 48
- Goals scored: 159 (3.31 per match)
- Top scorer(s): Georgi Asparuhov (Botev Plovdiv); Jimmy Greaves (Tottenham Hotspur); 6 goals each

The 1962–63 season of the European Cup Winners' Cup football club tournament was won by Tottenham Hotspur in a crushing final victory over holders Atlético Madrid. It was the first time a European cup went to an English club. The so-called "winner's curse" continued as Spurs failed to retain the cup in 1964.

== Teams ==
(Austria) GAK (CR)	(Bulgaria) Botev Plovdiv (CW)	(Czechoslovakia) Slovan Bratislava (CW)	(Denmark) B 1909 (CW)
(England) Tottenham Hotspur (CW)	(France) Saint-Étienne (CW)	(East Germany) Chemie Halle-Leuna (CW)	(West Germany) Nürnberg (CW)
(Greece) Olympiacos (2nd)	(Hungary) Újpest (2nd)	(Republic of Ireland) Shamrock Rovers (CW)	(Italy) Napoli (CW)
(Luxembourg) Alliance Dudelange (CW)	(Malta) Hibernians (CW)	(Netherlands) Sparta Rotterdam (CW)	(Northern Ireland) Portadown (CR)
(Poland) Zagłębie Sosnowiec (CW)	(Portugal) Vitória Setúbal (CR)	(Romania) Steaua București (CW)	(Scotland) Rangers (CW)
(Spain) Sevilla (CR)	(Spain) Atlético Madrid (3rd)^{TH}	(Switzerland) Lausanne Sports (CW)	(Wales) Bangor City (CW)
(Socialist Federal Republic of Yugoslavia) OFK Beograd (CW)

== Bracket ==
Preliminary round
(Luxembourg) Alliance Dudelange	1	1	2
(Denmark) B 1909	1	8	9
(France) Saint-Étienne	1	3	4
(Portugal) Vitória Setúbal	1	0	1
(Romania) Steaua București	3	1	4
(Bulgaria) Botev Plovdiv	2	5	7
(Malta) Hibernians	-	-	w
(Greece) Olympiacos	-	-	o
(Socialist Federal Republic of Yugoslavia) OFK Beograd	2	3	5
(East Germany) Chemie Halle-Leuna	0	3	3
(Hungary) Újpest	5	0	5
(Poland) Zagłębie Sosnowiec	0	0	0
(Wales) Bangor City	2	1	3 (1)
(Italy) Napoli	0	3	3 (2)
(Switzerland) Lausanne Sports	3	2	5
(Netherlands) Sparta Rotterdam	0	4	4
(Scotland) Rangers	4	0	4
(Spain) Sevilla	0	2	2

First round
(Austria) GAK	1	3	4
(Denmark) B 1909	1	5	6
(France) Saint-Étienne	0	0	0
(West Germany) Nürnberg	0	3	3
(Republic of Ireland) Shamrock Rovers	0	0	0
(Bulgaria) Botev Plovdiv	4	1	5
(Spain) Atlético Madrid	4	1	5
(Malta) Hibernians	0	0	0
(Socialist Federal Republic of Yugoslavia) OFK Beograd	5	2	7
(Northern Ireland) Portadown	1	3	4
(Hungary) Újpest	1	1	2 (1)
(Italy) Napoli	1	1	2 (3)
(Switzerland) Lausanne Sports	1	0	1
(Czechoslovakia) Slovan Bratislava	1	1	2
(England) Tottenham Hotspur	5	3	8
(Scotland) Rangers	2	2	4

Quarter-finals
(Denmark) B 1909	0	0	0
(West Germany) Nürnberg	1	6	7
(Bulgaria) Botev Plovdiv	1	0	1
(Spain) Atlético Madrid	1	4	5
(Socialist Federal Republic of Yugoslavia) OFK Beograd	2	1	3 (3)
(Italy) Napoli	0	3	3 (1)
(Czechoslovakia) Slovan Bratislava	2	0	2
(England) Tottenham Hotspur	0	6	6

Semi-finals
(West Germany) Nürnberg	2	0	2
(Spain) Atlético Madrid	1	2	3
(Socialist Federal Republic of Yugoslavia) OFK Beograd	1	1	2
(England) Tottenham Hotspur	2	3	5

Final
(Spain) Atlético Madrid	1
(England) Tottenham Hotspur	5

== Preliminary round ==
Team 1	Agg.	Team 2	1st leg	2nd leg
OFK Beograd (Socialist Federal Republic of Yugoslavia)	5–3	(East Germany) Chemie Halle-Leuna	2–0 (Report) (Report 2)	3–3 (Report) (Report 2)
Bangor City (Wales)	3–3^{1}	(Italy) Napoli	2–0 (Report) (Report 2)	1–3 (Report) (Report 2)
Lausanne Sports (Switzerland)	5–4	(Netherlands) Sparta Rotterdam	3–0 (Report) (Report 2)	2–4 (Report) (Report 2)
Rangers (Scotland)	4–2	(Spain) Sevilla	4–0 (Report) (Report 2)	0–2 (Report) (Report 2)
Saint-Étienne (France)	4–1	(Portugal) Vitória Setúbal	1–1 (Report) (Report 2)	3–0 (Report) (Report 2)
Alliance Dudelange (Luxembourg)	2–9	(Denmark) B 1909	1–1 (Report) (Report 2)	1–8 (Report) (Report 2)
Steaua București (Romania)	4–7	(Bulgaria) Botev Plovdiv	3–2 (Report) (Report 2)	1–5 (Report) (Report 2)
Újpest (Hungary)	5–0	(Poland) Zagłębie Sosnowiec	5–0 (Report) (Report 2)	0–0 (Report) (Report 2)
Hibernians (Malta)	(w/o)	(Greece) Olympiacos	–	–

^{1} Won play-off 2–1

=== First leg ===
5 September 1962

OFK Beograd (Socialist Federal Republic of Yugoslavia)	2–0	(East Germany) Chemie Halle-Leuna
Milošev 27'; Antić 55'

Omladinski Stadium, Belgrade
Referee: Lajos Aranyosi (Hungary)

5 September 1962

Bangor City (Wales)	2–0	(Italy) Napoli
Matthews 43'; Birch 52' (pen.)

Farrar Road, Bangor
Referee: Joop Martens (Netherlands)

19 September 1962

Lausanne Sports (Switzerland)	3–0	(Netherlands) Sparta Rotterdam
Vonlanthen 12'; Frigerio 55' ter Horst 64' (o.g.)

Stade Olympique de la Pontaise, Lausanne
Referee: Henri Faucheux (France)

5 September 1962

Rangers (Scotland)	4–0	(Spain) Sevilla
Millar 14', 17', 63'; Brand 64'

Ibrox Stadium, Glasgow
Referee: Tage Sørensen (Denmark)

20 September 1962

Saint-Étienne (France)	1–1	(Portugal) Vitória Setúbal
Mitoraj 72'		Mateus 57' (pen.)

Stade Geoffroy-Guichard, Saint-Étienne
Attendance: 11,983
Referee: Gennaro Marchese (Italy)

5 September 1962

Alliance Dudelange (Luxembourg)	1–1	(Denmark) B 1909
Zambon 55'		Petersen 50'

Stade Émile Mayrisch, Esch-sur-Alzette
Referee: Joseph Hannet (Belgium)

13 September 1962

Steaua București (Romania)	3–2	(Bulgaria) Botev Plovdiv
Voinea 43'; Constantin 67'; Crişan 86'	Report	Asparuhov 33', 48'

Stadionul 23 August, Bucharest
Attendance: 35,000
Referee: Borče Nedelkovski (Yugoslavia)

12 September 1962

Újpest (Hungary)	5–0	(Poland) Zagłębie Sosnowiec
Bene 3'; Göröcs 41', 64'; Solymosi 66'; Sóvári 87'

Megyeri úti Stadium, Budapest
Referee: Josef Stoll (Austria)

=== Second leg ===
19 September 1962

Chemie Halle-Leuna (East Germany)	3–3	(Socialist Federal Republic of Yugoslavia) OFK Beograd
Busch 15', 87' (pen.); Stein 28'		Antić 5'; Hoffmann 17' (o.g.); Skoblar 35'

Kurt-Wabbel-Stadion, Halle
Referee: Stanislav Fencl (Czechoslovakia)

OFK Beograd won 5–3 on aggregate.

26 September 1962

Napoli (Italy)	3–1	(Wales) Bangor City
Mariani 29'; Tacchi 54'; Fanello 84'		McAllister 71'

Stadio San Paolo, Naples
Referee: Daniel Mellet (Switzerland)

Napoli 3–3 Bangor City on aggregate.

3 October 1962

Sparta Rotterdam (Netherlands)	4–2	(Switzerland) Lausanne Sports
Wilson 42', 51', 57' van Miert 87'		Dürr 78' (pen.); Hertig 83'

De Kuip, Rotterdam
Referee: Kevin Howley (England)

Lausanne Sports won 5–4 on aggregate.

26 September 1962

Sevilla (Spain)	2–0	(Scotland) Rangers
Diéguez 16'; Mateos 48'

Ramón Sánchez Pizjuán Stadium, Seville
Referee: Décio Freitas (Portugal)

Rangers won 4–2 on aggregate.

23 September 1962

Vitória Setúbal (Portugal)	0–3	(France) Saint-Étienne
		Faivre 44', 55'; Baulu 72'

Estádio do Bonfim, Setúbal
Attendance: 5,346
Referee: Juan Gardeazabal Garay (Spain)

Saint-Étienne won 4–1 on aggregate.

18 September 1962

B 1909 (Denmark)	8–1	(Luxembourg) Alliance Dudelange
Madsen 10'; Danielsen 43', 71'; Christensen 60'; Hansen 74', 90'; Nielsen 80'; Berg 87'		Zambon 10'

Odense Stadium, Odense
Referee: Gerhard Schulenburg (West Germany)

B 1909 won 9–2 on aggregate.

19 September 1962

Botev Plovdiv (Bulgaria)	5–1	(Romania) Steaua București
Apostolov 7'; Asparuhov 14', 30', 44'; Dermendzhiev 56'	Report	Tătaru 50'

9th September Stadium, Plovdiv
Attendance: 18,614
Referee: Petros Tsouvaras (Greece)

Botev Plovdiv won 7–4 on aggregate.

26 September 1962

Zagłębie Sosnowiec (Poland)	0–0	(Hungary) Újpest

Stadion Ludowy, Sosnowiec
Referee: Walter Meißner (West Germany)

Újpest won 5–0 on aggregate.

=== Play-off ===
10 October 1962

Napoli (Italy)	2–1	(Wales) Bangor City
Rosa 37', 85'	Report; Report 2	McAllister 70'

Highbury, London
Referee: Arthur Holland (England)

Napoli won 2–1 in play-off.

== First round ==
Team 1	Agg.	Team 2	1st leg	2nd leg
OFK Beograd (Socialist Federal Republic of Yugoslavia)	7–4	(Northern Ireland) Portadown	5–1 (Report) (Report 2)	2–3 (Report) (Report 2)
Újpest Dózsa (Hungary)	2–2^{2}	(Italy) Napoli	1–1 (Report) (Report 2)	1–1 (Report) (Report 2)
Lausanne-Sports (Switzerland)	1–2	(Czechoslovakia) Slovan Bratislava	1–1 (Report) (Report 2)	0–1 (Report) (Report 2)
Tottenham Hotspur (England)	8–4	(Scotland) Rangers	5–2 (Report) (Report 2)	3–2 (Report) (Report 2)
Saint-Étienne (France)	0–3	(West Germany) Nürnberg	0–0 (Report) (Report 2)	0–3 (Report) (Report 2)
GAK (Austria)	4–6	(Denmark) Boldklubben 1909	1–1 (Report) (Report 2)	3–5 (Report) (Report 2)
Shamrock Rovers (Republic of Ireland)	0–5	(Bulgaria) Botev Plovdiv	0–4 (Report) (Report 2)	0–1 (Report) (Report 2)
Atlético Madrid (Spain)	5–0	(Malta) Hibernians	4–0 (Report) (Report 2)	1–0 (Report) (Report 2)

^{2} Won play-off 3–1

=== First leg ===
7 November 1962

OFK Beograd (Socialist Federal Republic of Yugoslavia)	5–1	(Northern Ireland) Portadown
Đukić 3'; Skoblar 22', 78'; Gugleta 50'; Čebinac 56'		Clements 58'

Omladinski Stadium, Belgrade
Referee: Lajos Horvath (Hungary)

14 November 1962

Újpest Dózsa (Hungary)	1–1	(Italy) Napoli
Bene 1'		Fraschini 60'

Megyeri úti Stadium, Budapest
Referee: Paul Schiller (Austria)

14 November 1962

Lausanne-Sports (Switzerland)	1–1	(Czechoslovakia) Slovan Bratislava
Hosp 40'		Moravčík 52'

Stade Olympique de la Pontaise, Lausanne
Attendance: 11875
Referee: Alfeo Grignani (Italy)

31 October 1962

Tottenham Hotspur (England)	5–2	(Scotland) Rangers
White 4'; Greaves 23'; Allen 37'; Shearer 43' (o.g.); Norman 78'		Henderson 9'; Millar 44'

White Hart Lane, Tottenham
Referee: Kurt Tschenscher (West Germany)

18 October 1962

Saint-Étienne (France)	0–0	(West Germany) Nürnberg

Stade Geoffroy-Guichard, Saint-Étienne
Referee: Daniel Zariquiegui Izco (Spain)

30 October 1962

GAK (Austria)	1–1	(Denmark) Boldklubben 1909
Jank 89'		Hansen 38'

Liebenauer Stadium, Graz
Referee: Dittmar Huber (Switzerland)

24 October 1962

Shamrock Rovers (Republic of Ireland)	0–4	(Bulgaria) Botev Plovdiv
		Asparuhov 2'; Peshev 47'; Popov 70', 78'

Dalymount Park, Dublin
Referee: Andries van Leeuwen (Netherlands)

24 October 1962

Atlético Madrid (Spain)	4–0	(Malta) Hibernians
Mendonça 12'; Medina 27'; Collar 60' (pen.); Ramiro 74'

Estadio Metropolitano, Madrid
Referee: Abel da Costa (Portugal)

=== Second leg ===
21 November 1962

Portadown (Northern Ireland)	3–2	(Socialist Federal Republic of Yugoslavia) OFK Beograd
Burke 17'; Jones 32'; Cush 88'		Popov 60'; Skoblar 65'

Windsor Park, Belfast
Referee: Einar Poulsen (Denmark)

OFK Beograd won 7–4 on aggregate.

28 November 1962

Napoli (Italy)	1–1	(Hungary) Újpest Dózsa
Tomeazzi 33'		Solymosi 36'

Stadio San Paolo, Naples
Referee: Arthur Lentini (Malta)

Napoli 2–2 Újpest Dózsa on aggregate.

28 November 1962

Slovan Bratislava (Czechoslovakia)	1–0	(Switzerland) Lausanne-Sports
Moravčík 86'

Tehelné pole, Bratislava
Attendance: 5314
Referee: Fritz Seipelt (Austria)

Slovan Bratislava won 2–1 on aggregate.

11 December 1962

Rangers (Scotland)	2–3	(England) Tottenham Hotspur
Brand 47'; Davie Wilson 74'		Greaves 8'; Smith 50', 89'

Ibrox Stadium, Glasgow
Referee: Marcel Bois (France)

Tottenham Hotspur won 8–4 on aggregate.

14 November 1962

Nürnberg (West Germany)	3–0	(France) Saint-Étienne
Strehl 27'; Wild 63'; Haseneder 73'

Städtisches Stadion, Nuremberg
Referee: Karol Galba (Czechoslovakia)

Nürnberg won 3–0 on aggregate.

14 November 1962

Boldklubben 1909 (Denmark)	5–3	(Austria) GAK
Petersen 5', 33', 48', 57'; Berg 75'		Koleznik 28'; Loske 30'; Stessl 43'

Odense Stadium, Odense
Referee: Hugh Phillips (Scotland)

Boldklubben 1909 won 6–4 on aggregate.

14 November 1962

Botev Plovdiv (Bulgaria)	1–0	(Republic of Ireland) Shamrock Rovers
Peshev 2'

Stadion Hristo Botev, Plovdiv
Referee: Aleksandar Škorić (Yugoslavia)

Botev Plovdiv won 5–0 on aggregate.

7 November 1962

Hibernians (Malta)	0–1	(Spain) Atlético Madrid
		Jones 24'

Empire Stadium (Gżira), Gżira
Referee: Cesare Jonni (Italy)

Atlético Madrid won 5–0 on aggregate.

=== Play-off ===
4 December 1962

Napoli (Italy)	3–1	(Hungary) Újpest Dózsa
Fanello 8'; Ronzon 10'; Tacchi 34'	Report; Report 2	Kuharszki 52'

Stade Olympique de la Pontaise, Lausanne
Referee: Daniel Mellet (Switzerland)

Napoli won 3–1 in play-off.

== Quarter-finals ==
Team 1	Agg.	Team 2	1st leg	2nd leg
OFK Beograd (Socialist Federal Republic of Yugoslavia)	3–3^{3}	(Italy) Napoli	2–0 (Report) (Report 2)	1–3 (Report) (Report 2)
Slovan Bratislava (Czechoslovakia)	2–6	(England) Tottenham Hotspur	2–0 (Report) (Report 2)	0–6 (Report) (Report 2)
Boldklubben 1909 (Denmark)	0–7	(West Germany) Nürnberg	0–1 (Report) (Report 2)	0–6 (Report) (Report 2)
Botev Plovdiv (Bulgaria)	1–5	(Spain) Atlético Madrid	1–1 (Report) (Report 2)	0–4 (Report) (Report 2)

^{3} Won play-off 3–1

=== First leg ===
6 February 1963

OFK Beograd (Socialist Federal Republic of Yugoslavia)	2–0	(Italy) Napoli
Samardžić 78'; Popov 88'

Red Star Stadium, Belgrade
Referee: István Zsolt (Hungary)

5 March 1963

Slovan Bratislava (Czechoslovakia)	2–0	(England) Tottenham Hotspur
Cvetler 31'; Moravčík 54'

Tehelné pole, Bratislava
Attendance: 22788
Referee: Ryszard Banasiuk (Poland)

21 March 1963

Boldklubben 1909 (Denmark)	0–1	(West Germany) Nürnberg
		Flachenecker 60' (pen.)

Rosenaustadion, Augsburg
Referee: Jack Taylor (England)

27 February 1963

Botev Plovdiv (Bulgaria)	1–1	(Spain) Atlético Madrid
Peshev 16'		Ramiro 74'

Stadion Hristo Botev, Plovdiv
Referee: Branko Tesanić (Yugoslavia)

=== Second leg ===
20 March 1963

Napoli (Italy)	3–1	(Socialist Federal Republic of Yugoslavia) OFK Beograd
Cané 12'; Fanello 58'; Mariani 67'		Samardžić 42'

Stadio San Paolo, Naples
Referee: Albert Guinnard (Switzerland)

Napoli 3–3 OFK Beograd on aggregate.

14 March 1963

Tottenham Hotspur (England)	6–0	(Czechoslovakia) Slovan Bratislava
Mackay 31'; Greaves 44', 65'; Smith 45'; Jones 75'; White 85'

White Hart Lane, Tottenham
Attendance: 61504
Referee: Leo Horn (Netherlands)

Tottenham Hotspur won 6–2 on aggregate.

24 March 1963

Nürnberg (West Germany)	6–0	(Denmark) Boldklubben 1909
Morlock 34', 40'; Dachlauer 38'; Wild 64'; Engler 84' (pen.); Haseneder 89'

Städtisches Stadion, Nuremberg
Referee: Taki Wlachojanis (Austria)

Nürnberg won 7–0 on aggregate.

13 March 1963

Atlético Madrid (Spain)	4–0	(Bulgaria) Botev Plovdiv
Adelardo Rodríguez 10'; Chuzo 25'; Enrique Collar 65'; Chuzo 85'

Estadio Metropolitano, Madrid
Attendance: 36.523
Referee: Marcel Bois (France)

Atlético Madrid won 5–1 on aggregate.

=== Play-off ===
3 April 1963

OFK Beograd (Socialist Federal Republic of Yugoslavia)	3–1	(Italy) Napoli
Samardžić 19', 83'; Popov 53'	Report; Report 2	Cané 23'

Stade Vélodrome, Marseille
Referee: Joseph Barbéran (France)

OFK Beograd won 3–1 in play-off.

== Semi-finals ==
Team 1	Agg.	Team 2	1st leg	2nd leg
OFK Beograd (Socialist Federal Republic of Yugoslavia)	2–5	(England) Tottenham Hotspur	1–2	1–3
Nürnberg (West Germany)	2–3	(Spain) Atlético Madrid	2–1	0–2

=== First leg ===
24 April 1963

OFK Beograd (Socialist Federal Republic of Yugoslavia)	1–2	(England) Tottenham Hotspur
Popov 36' (pen.)	Report; Report 2	White 27'; Dyson 72'

Omladinski Stadium, Belgrade
Referee: Lajos Aranyosi (Hungary)

10 April 1963
17:00

Nürnberg (West Germany)	2–1	(Spain) Atlético Madrid
Wild 31', 70'	Report; Report 2	Jones 24'

Städtisches Stadion, Nuremberg
Attendance: 44,140
Referee: Clive Kingston (Wales)

=== Second leg ===
1 May 1963

Tottenham Hotspur (England)	3–1	(Socialist Federal Republic of Yugoslavia) OFK Beograd
Mackay 23'; Jones 43'; Smith 49'	Report; Report 2	Skoblar 28'

White Hart Lane, Tottenham
Referee: Tage Sørensen (Denmark)

Tottenham Hotspur won 5–2 on aggregate.

24 April 1963
20:30

Atlético Madrid (Spain)	2–0	(West Germany) Nürnberg
Chuzo 45'; Mendonça 54'	Report; Report 2

Santiago Bernabéu, Madrid
Attendance: 86,130
Referee: Othmar Huber (Switzerland)

Atlético Madrid won 3–2 on aggregate.

== Final ==
15 May 1963
20:15

Atlético Madrid (Spain)	1–5	(England) Tottenham Hotspur
Collar 47' (pen.)	Report; Report 2	Greaves 16', 80'; White 35'; Dyson 67', 85'

Feijenoord Stadion, Rotterdam
Attendance: 49,000
Referee: Andries van Leeuwen (Netherlands)

== Top scorers ==
The top scorers from the 1962–63 European Cup Winners' Cup (including preliminary round) are as follows:

Rank	Name	Team	Goals
1	(Bulgaria) Georgi Asparuhov	(Bulgaria) Botev Plovdiv	6
1	(England) Jimmy Greaves	(England) Tottenham Hotspur	6
3	(Denmark) Jørgen Petersen	(Denmark) B 1909	5
3	(Socialist Federal Republic of Yugoslavia) Josip Skoblar	(Socialist Federal Republic of Yugoslavia) OFK Beograd	5
5	(Scotland) Jimmy Millar	(Scotland) Rangers	4
5	(Socialist Federal Republic of Yugoslavia) Milorad Popov	(Socialist Federal Republic of Yugoslavia) OFK Beograd	4
5	(Socialist Federal Republic of Yugoslavia) Spasoje Samardžić	(Socialist Federal Republic of Yugoslavia) OFK Beograd	4
5	(England) Bobby Smith	(England) Tottenham Hotspur	4
5	(Scotland) John White	(England) Tottenham Hotspur	4
5	(West Germany) Tasso Wild	(West Germany) Nürnberg	4

== See also ==
- 1962–63 European Cup
- 1962–63 Inter-Cities Fairs Cup
