= Zambon (surname) =

Zambon is a surname. Notable people with the surname include:

- Fanny Zambon (born 1996): French racing cyclist
- Francis Zambon, birth name of songwriter Mark James
- Jules Zambon (born 1938), Luxembourgish footballer
- Maria Zambon, British virologist
- Rosanna Zambon (born 1950), Italian singer
