= Bulgarian football clubs in European competitions =

This is a list of Bulgarian football clubs in European competition. Bulgarian clubs have participated since 1956, when CSKA Sofia entered the 1956–57 European Cup.

== Achievements ==
=== Biggest Achievements ===
	European Cup / UEFA Champions League		UEFA Cup / Europa League		UEFA Cup Winners' Cup	
Club	Semi-finalist	Quarter-finalist	Semi-finalist	Quarter-finalist	Semi-finalist	Quarter-finalist
CSKA Sofia	1967, 1982	1957, 1974, 1981, 1990	-	-	1989	-
Levski Sofia	-	-	-	1976, 2006	-	1970, 1977, 1987
Lokomotiv Sofia	-	-	-	1980	-	-
Slavia Sofia	-	-	-	-	1967	1981
Botev Plovdiv	-	-	-	-	-	1963
Beroe Stara Zagora	-	-	-	-	-	1974

== Statistics ==
As of 3 November 2022.

- Most European Cup / Champions League competitions appeared in: 25 – CSKA Sofia
- Most Inter-Cities Fairs Cup / UEFA Cup / Europa League competitions appeared in: 26 – Levski Sofia
- Most UEFA Europa Conference League competitions appeared in: 2 – CSKA Sofia
- Most Cup Winners' Cup competitions appeared in: 11 – Levski Sofia
- Most Intertoto Cup competitions appeared in: 5 – Spartak Varna
- Most competitions appeared in overall: 58 – CSKA Sofia
- First match played: CSKA Sofia 8–1 Dinamo București (1956–57 European Cup R1)
- Most matches played: 258 – CSKA Sofia
- Most match wins: 100 – CSKA Sofia
- Most match draws: 56 – CSKA Sofia
- Most match losses: 102 – CSKA Sofia
- Biggest win (match): 10 goals
  - Levski Sofia 12–2 Lahden Reipas (1976–77 European Cup Winners' Cup R1)
- Biggest win (aggregate): 16 goals
  - Levski Sofia 19–3 Lahden Reipas (1976–77 European Cup Winners' Cup R1)
- Biggest defeat (match): 8 goals
  - Sigma Olomouc 8–0 Velbazhd Kyustendil (2000 UEFA Intertoto Cup R2)
- Biggest defeat (aggregate): 10 goals
  - Slavia Sofia 0–10 Partizan (1988–89 UEFA Cup R1)

=== UEFA coefficient and ranking ===
For the 2020–21 UEFA competitions, the associations will be allocated places according to their 2019 UEFA country coefficients, which will take into account their performance in European competitions from 2014–15 to 2018–19. In the 2019 rankings that will be used for the 2020–21 European competitions, Bulgaria's coefficient points total is 17.500. After earning a score of 4.000 during the 2018–19 European campaign, Bulgaria is ranked by UEFA as the 28th best association in Europe out of 55.

- 26 Azerbaijan 19.000
- 27 Israel 18.625
- 28 Bulgaria 17.500
- 29 Romania 15.950
- 30 Slovakia 15.625
  - Full list

=== UEFA country coefficient history ===
(As of 2 September 2022), Source: Bert Kassies website.

Accumulated	Valid	Rank	Movement	Coefficient	Change
1955–56 to 1959–60	1961–62	16	Steady	10.000	Steady
1956–57 to 1960–61	1962–63	15	▲ +1	13.000	▲ +3.000
1957–58 to 1961–62	1963–64	18	▼ –3	9.000	▼ –4.000
1958–59 to 1962–63	1964–65	17	▲ +1	13.500	▲ +4.500
1959–60 to 1963–64	1965–66	16	▲ +1	14.500	▲ +1.000
1960–61 to 1964–65	1966–67	12	▲ +4	18.500	▲ +4.000
1961–62 to 1965–66	1967–68	11	▲ +1	19.166	▲ +0.666
1962–63 to 1966–67	1968–69	8	▲ +3	26.499	▲ +7.333
1963–64 to 1967–68	1969–70	11	▼ –3	21.332	▼ –5.167
1964–65 to 1968–69	1970–71	13	▼ –2	19.832	▼ –1.500
1965–66 to 1969–70	1971–72	15	▼ –2	19.082	▼ –0.750
1966–67 to 1970–71	1972–73	15	Steady	17.416	▼ –1.666
1967–68 to 1971–72	1973–74	19	▼ –4	11.083	▼ –6.333
1968–69 to 1972–73	1974–75	19	Steady	13.500	▲ +2.417
1969–70 to 1973–74	1975–76	17	▲ +2	17.750	▲ +4.250
1970–71 to 1974–75	1976–77	17	Steady	14.250	▼ –3.500
1971–72 to 1975–76	1977–78	17	Steady	16.500	▲ +2.250
1972–73 to 1976–77	1978–79	15	▲ +2	18.500	▲ +2.000
1973–74 to 1977–78	1979–80	18	▼ –3	16.750	▼ –1.750
1974–75 to 1978–79	1980–81	21	▼ –3	13.200	▼ –3.550
1975–76 to 1979–80	1981–82	20	▲ +1	15.450	▲ +2.250
1976–77 to 1980–81	1982–83	17	▲ +3	16.950	▲ +1.500
1977–78 to 1981–82	1983–84	17	Steady	16.700	▼ –0.250
1978–79 to 1982–83	1984–85	18	▼ –1	16.700	Steady
1979–80 to 1983–84	1985–86	18	Steady	16.750	▲ +0.050
1980–81 to 1984–85	1986–87	17	▲ +1	17.250	▲ +0.500
1981–82 to 1985–86	1987–88	21	▼ –4	13.166	▼ –4.084
1982–83 to 1986–87	1988–89	23	▼ –2	12.666	▼ –0.500
1983–84 to 1987–88	1989–90	23	Steady	11.916	▼ –0.750
1984–85 to 1988–89	1990–91	23	Steady	12.916	▲ +1.000
1985–86 to 1989–90	1991–92	22	▲ +1	12.749	▼ –0.167
1986–87 to 1990–91	1992–93	22	Steady	12.416	▼ –0.333
1987–88 to 1991–92	1993–94	23	▼ –1	10.416	▼ –2.000

Accumulated	Valid	Rank	Movement	Coefficient	Change
1988–89 to 1992–93	1994–95	20	▲ +3	10.666	▲ +0.250
1989–90 to 1993–94	1995–96	20	Steady	9.166	▼ –1.500
1990–91 to 1994–95	1996–97	31	▼ –11	7.583	▼ –1.583
1991–92 to 1995–96	1997–98	32	▼ –1	9.250	▲ +1.667
1992–93 to 1996–97	1998–99	33	▼ –1	10.666	▲ +1.416
1993–94 to 1997–98	1999–00	32	▲ +1	10.499	▼ –0.167
1994–95 to 1998–99	2000–01	32	Steady	7.582	▼ –2.917
1995–96 to 1999–00	2001–02	29	▲ +3	10.540	▲ +2.958
1996–97 to 2000–01	2002–03	28	▲ +1	11.665	▲ +1.125
1997–98 to 2001–02	2003–04	25	▲ +3	15.165	▲ +3.500
1998–99 to 2002–03	2004–05	20	▲ +5	18.665	▲ +3.500
1999–00 to 2003–04	2005–06	20	Steady	19.998	▲ +1.333
2000–01 to 2004–05	2006–07	21	▼ –1	18.540	▼ –1.458
2001–02 to 2005–06	2007–08	17	▲ +4	24.290	▲ +5.750
2002–03 to 2006–07	2008–09	16	▲ +1	24.582	▲ +0.292
2003–04 to 2007–08	2009–10	17	▼ –1	23.166	▼ –1.416
2004–05 to 2008–09	2010–11	17	Steady	21.250	▼ –1.916
2005–06 to 2009–10	2011–12	17	Steady	22.000	▲ +0.750
2006–07 to 2010–11	2012–13	21	▼ –4	17.875	▼ –4.125
2007–08 to 2011–12	2013–14	28	▼ –7	14.250	▼ –3.625
2008–09 to 2012–13	2014–15	28	Steady	12.250	▼ –2.000
2009–10 to 2013–14	2015–16	25	▲ +3	15.625	▲ +3.375
2010–11 to 2014–15	2016–17	25	Steady	16.750	▲ +1.125
2011–12 to 2015–16	2017–18	29	▼ –4	13.125	▼ –3.625
2012–13 to 2016–17	2018–19	27	▲ +2	15.875	▲ +2.750
2013–14 to 2017–18	2019–20	24	▲ +3	19.125	▲ +3.250
2014–15 to 2018–19	2020–21	28	▼ –4	17.500	▼ –1.625
2015–16 to 2019–20	2021–22	27	▲ +1	17.375	▼ –0.175
2016–17 to 2020–21	2022–23	24	▲ +3	20.375	▲ +3.000
2017–18 to 2021–22	2023–24	24	Steady	19.500	▼ –0.875

== Appearances in UEFA competitions ==
As of 3 November 2022

Club	UEFA Champions League (includes European Cup)					UEFA Europa League (includes UEFA Cup)					UEFA Europa Conference League					UEFA Cup Winners' Cup					UEFA Intertoto Cup					Total					First Appearance	Last Appearance
Club	App.	P	W	D	L	App.	P	W	D	L	App.	P	W	D	L	App.	P	W	D	L	App.	P	W	D	L	App.	P	W	D	L	First Appearance	Last Appearance
CSKA Sofia	25	98	41	16	41	25	113	39	34	42	2	18	5	5	8	5	23	13	0	10	1	4	2	1	1	58	258	100	56	102	1956–57 EC	2022–23 UECL
Levski Sofia	15	58	15	14	29	26	112	41	25	46	1	4	1	1	2	11	36	14	5	17	0	0	0	0	0	53	210	71	45	94	1966–66 EC	2022–23 UECL
Ludogorets Razgrad	11	60	22	14	24	8	67	21	20	26	1	1	1	0	0	0	0	0	0	0	0	0	0	0	0	19	128	44	34	50	2012–13 UCL	2022–23 UECL
Litex Lovech	4	16	8	1	7	13	56	23	12	21	0	0	0	0	0	0	0	0	0	0	0	0	0	0	0	17	72	31	13	28	1998–99 UCL	2015–16 UEL
Botev Plovdiv	2	4	1	0	3	10	35	12	11	10	1	2	0	1	1	3	12	6	2	4	0	0	0	0	0	16	53	19	14	18	1962–63 CWC	2022–23 UECL
Slavia Sofia	0	0	0	0	0	10	23	7	3	13	0	0	0	0	0	6	25	9	3	13	0	0	0	0	0	16	47	16	6	26	1963–64 CWC	2020–21 UEL
Lokomotiv Plovdiv	1	2	0	0	2	11	28	8	2	18	1	4	1	1	2	0	0	0	0	0	1	2	0	1	1	14	35	9	4	23	1971–72 UC	2021–22 UECL
Lokomotiv Sofia	2	8	3	1	4	8	34	12	11	11	0	0	0	0	0	3	8	3	0	5	0	0	0	0	0	13	50	18	12	20	1964–65 EC	2011–12 UEL
Beroe Stara Zagora	1	2	0	1	1	6	22	8	6	8	0	0	0	0	0	2	10	5	1	4	0	0	0	0	0	9	34	13	8	13	1972–73 UC	2016–17 UEL
Spartak Varna	0	0	0	0	0	2	6	1	2	3	0	0	0	0	0	0	0	0	0	0	5	16	2	5	9	7	22	3	7	12	1961–62 CWC	2001 UIC
Marek Dupnitsa	0	0	0	0	0	1	4	2	0	2	0	0	0	0	0	1	2	1	0	1	3	14	4	5	5	5	20	7	5	8	1977–78 UC	2004 UIC
Cherno More Varna	0	0	0	0	0	3	12	5	3	4	0	0	0	0	0	0	0	0	0	0	1	4	2	0	2	4	16	7	3	6	2007 UIC	2014–15 UEL
Naftex Burgas	0	0	0	0	0	2	6	2	2	2	0	0	0	0	0	0	0	0	0	0	0	0	0	0	0	2	6	2	2	2	1997–98 UC	2000–01 UC
Akademik Sofia	0	0	0	0	0	2	6	2	0	4	0	0	0	0	0	0	0	0	0	0	0	0	0	0	0	2	6	2	0	4	1976–77 UC	1981–82 UC
Pirin Blagoevgrad	0	0	0	0	0	1	2	0	0	2	0	0	0	0	0	1	4	2	0	2	0	0	0	0	0	2	6	2	0	4	1985–86 UC	1994–95 CWC
Sliven	0	0	0	0	0	1	2	1	0	1	0	0	0	0	0	0	2	0	0	2	0	0	0	0	0	2	4	1	0	3	1984–85 UC	1990–91 CWC
Dunav Ruse	0	0	0	0	0	2	4	1	0	3	0	0	0	0	0	0	0	0	0	0	0	0	0	0	0	2	4	1	0	3	1975–76 UC	2017–18 UEL
Etar Veliko Tarnovo	1	2	0	1	1	1	2	0	1	1	0	0	0	0	0	0	0	0	0	0	0	0	0	0	0	2	4	0	2	2	1974–75 UC	1991–92 EC
Velbazhd Kyustendil	0	0	0	0	0	0	0	0	0	0	0	0	0	0	0	0	0	0	0	0	1	4	1	2	1	1	4	1	2	1	2000 UIC	2000 UIC
Spartak Plovdiv	1	4	1	1	2	0	0	0	0	0	0	0	0	0	0	0	0	0	0	0	0	0	0	0	0	1	4	1	1	2	1963–64 EC	1963–64 EC
PSFC Chernomorets	0	0	0	0	0	0	0	0	0	0	0	0	0	0	0	0	0	0	0	0	1	4	1	1	2	1	4	1	1	2	2008 UIC	2008 UIC
FC Chernomorets	0	0	0	0	0	0	0	0	0	0	0	0	0	0	0	1	2	1	0	1	0	0	0	0	0	1	2	1	0	1	1989–90 UC	1989–90 UC
Botev Vratsa	0	0	0	0	0	1	2	0	0	2	0	0	0	0	0	0	0	0	0	0	0	0	0	0	0	1	2	0	0	2	1971–72 UC	1971–72 UC
Shumen	0	0	0	0	0	1	2	0	0	2	0	0	0	0	0	0	0	0	0	0	0	0	0	0	0	1	2	0	0	2	1994–95 UC	1994–95 UC
Arda	0	0	0	0	0	0	0	0	0	0	1	2	0	0	2	0	0	0	0	0	0	0	0	0	0	1	2	0	0	2	2022–23 UECL	2022–23 UECL
Total (25)	—	254	91	49	114	—	537	183	133	220	-	31	9	8	14	—	124	54	11	59	—	48	12	15	21	—	993	348	216	427		

App. = Appearances; P = Matches played; W = Matches won; D = Matches drawn; L = Matches lost; EC = European Cup; UCL = UEFA Champions League; UC = UEFA Cup; UEL = UEFA Europa League; CWC = UEFA Cup Winners' Cup; UIC = UEFA Intertoto Cup.

== Active competitions ==
=== European Cup / UEFA Champions League ===
Season	Club	Round	Opponent	Home	Away	Aggregate
European Cup
1956–57	CSKA Sofia	1R	(Romania) Dinamo București	8–1	2–3	10–4
1956–57	CSKA Sofia	QF	(Socialist Federal Republic of Yugoslavia) Red Star Belgrade	2–1	1–3	3–4
1957–58	CSKA Sofia	PR	(Hungary) Vasas	2–1	1–6	3–7
1958–59	CSKA Sofia	1R	(Spain) Atlético Madrid	1–0	1–2	2–2 (1–3 Play-off)
1959–60	CSKA Sofia	PR	(Spain) Barcelona	2–2	2–6	4–8
1960–61	CSKA Sofia	PR	(Italy) Juventus	4–1	0–2	4–3
1960–61	CSKA Sofia	1R	(Sweden) IFK Malmö	1–1	0–1	1–2
1961–62	CSKA Sofia	PR	(Czechoslovakia) Dukla Prague	4–4	1–2	5–6
1962–63	CSKA Sofia	PR	(Socialist Federal Republic of Yugoslavia) Partizan	2–1	4–1	6–2
1962–63	CSKA Sofia	1R	(Belgium) Anderlecht	2–2	0–2	2–4
1963–64	Spartak Plovdiv	PR	(Albania) Partizani Tirana	3–1	0–1	3–2
1963–64	Spartak Plovdiv	1R	(Netherlands) PSV Eindhoven	0–1	0–0	0–1
1964–65	Lokomotiv Sofia	PR	(Sweden) Malmö	8–3	0–2	8–5
1964–65	Lokomotiv Sofia	1R	(Hungary) Vasas ETO Györ	4–3	3–5	7–8
1965–66	Levski Sofia	PR	(Sweden) Djurgården	6–0	1–2	7–2
1965–66	Levski Sofia	1R	(Portugal) Benfica	2–2	2–3	4–5
1966–67	CSKA Sofia	PR	(Malta) Sliema Wanderers	4–0	2–1	6–1
1966–67	CSKA Sofia	1R	(Greece) Olympiacos	3–1	0–1	3–2
1966–67	CSKA Sofia	2R	(Poland) Górnik Zabrze	4–0	0–3	4–3
1966–67	CSKA Sofia	QF	(Northern Ireland) Linfield	1–0	2–2	3–2
1966–67	CSKA Sofia	SF	(Italy) Inter Milan	1–1	1–1	2–2 (0–1 Play-off)
1967–68	Botev Plovdiv	1R	(Romania) Rapid București	2–0	0–3	2–3 (a.e.t.)
1968–69	Levski Sofia	Withdraw from the competition^{1}				
1969–70	CSKA Sofia	1R	(Hungary) Ferencváros	2–1	1–4	3–5
1970–71	Levski Sofia	PR	Austria Wien	3–1	0–3	3–4
1971–72	CSKA Sofia	1R	(Albania) Partizani Tirana	3–0	1–0	4–0
1971–72	CSKA Sofia	2R	(Portugal) Benfica	0–0	1–2	1–2
1972–73	CSKA Sofia	1R	(Greece) Panathinaikos	2–1	2–0	4–1
1972–73	CSKA Sofia	2R	(Netherlands) Ajax	1–3	0–3	1–6
1973–74	CSKA Sofia	1R	(Austria) Wacker Innsbruck	3–0	1–0	4–0
1973–74	CSKA Sofia	2R	(Netherlands) Ajax	2–0	0–1	2–1
1973–74	CSKA Sofia	QF	(West Germany) Bayern Munich	2–1	1–4	3–5
1974–75	Levski Sofia	1R	(Hungary) Újpesti Dózsa	0–3	1–4	1–7
1975–76	CSKA Sofia	1R	(Italy) Juventus	2–1	0–2	2–3
1976–77	CSKA Sofia	1R	(France) Saint-Étienne	0–0	0–1	0–1
1977–78	Levski Sofia	1R	(Poland) Śląsk Wrocław	3–0	2–2	5–2
1977–78	Levski Sofia	2R	(Netherlands) Ajax	1–2	1–2	2–4
1978–79	Lokomotiv Sofia	1R	(Denmark) Odense	2–1	2–2	4–3
1978–79	Lokomotiv Sofia	2R	(West Germany) Köln	0–1	0–4	0–5
1979–80	Levski Sofia	1R	(Spain) Real Madrid	0–1	0–2	0–3
1980–81	CSKA Sofia	1R	(England) Nottingham Forest	1–0	1–0	2–0
1980–81	CSKA Sofia	2R	(Poland) Szombierki Bytom	4–0	1–0	5–0
1980–81	CSKA Sofia	QF	(England) Liverpool	0–1	1–5	1–6
1981–82	CSKA Sofia	1R	(Spain) Real Sociedad	1–0	0–0	1–0
1981–82	CSKA Sofia	2R	(Northern Ireland) Glentoran	2–0	1–2	3–2
1981–82	CSKA Sofia	QF	(England) Liverpool	2–0	0–1	2–1
1981–82	CSKA Sofia	SF	(West Germany) Bayern Munich	4–3	0–4	4–7
1982–83	CSKA Sofia	1R	(France) Monaco	2–0	0–0	2–0
1982–83	CSKA Sofia	2R	(Portugal) Sporting CP	2–2	0–0	2–2 (a)
1983–84	CSKA Sofia	1R	(Cyprus) Omonia	3–0	1–4	4–4 (a)
1983–84	CSKA Sofia	2R	(Italy) Roma	0–1	0–1	0–2
1984–85	Levski Sofia	1R	(West Germany) Stuttgart	1–1	2–2	3–3 (a)
1984–85	Levski Sofia	2R	(Soviet Union) Dnipro	3–1	0–2	3–3 (a)
1985–86	Botev Plovdiv^{2}	1R	(Sweden) IFK Göteborg	1–2	2–3	3–5
1986–87	Beroe Stara Zagora	1R	(Soviet Union) Dynamo Kyiv	1–1	0–2	1–3
1987–88	CSKA Sofia	1R	(West Germany) Bayern Munich	0–1	0–4	0–5
1988–89	Levski Sofia	1R	(Italy) Milan	0–2	2–5	2–7
1989–90	CSKA Sofia	1R	(Poland) Ruch Chorzów	5–1	1–1	6–2
1989–90	CSKA Sofia	2R	(Czechoslovakia) Sparta Prague	3–0	2–2	5–2
1989–90	CSKA Sofia	QF	(France) Marseille	0–1	1–3	1–4
1990–91	CSKA Sofia	1R	(Iceland) KA Akureyri	3–0	0–1	3–1
1990–91	CSKA Sofia	2R	(West Germany) Bayern Munich	0–3	0–4	0–7
1991–92	Etar Veliko Tarnovo	1R	(Germany) Kaiserslautern	1–1	0–2	1–3
UEFA Champions League
1992–93	CSKA Sofia	1R	Austria Wien	3–2	1–3	4–5
1993–94	Levski Sofia	1R	(Scotland) Rangers	2–1	2–3	4–4 (a)
1993–94	Levski Sofia	2R	(Germany) Werder Bremen	2–2	0–1	2–3
1994–95	Did not participate^{3}					
1995–96	Did not participate^{3}					
1996–97	Did not participate^{3}					
1997–98	CSKA Sofia	1Q	(Romania) Steaua București	0–2	3–3	3–5
1998–99	Litex Lovech	1Q	(Sweden) Halmstad	2–0	1–2	3–2
1998–99	Litex Lovech	2Q	(Russia) Spartak Moscow	0–5	2–6	2–11
1999–00	Litex Lovech	1Q	(Northern Ireland) Glentoran	3–0	2–0	5–0
1999–00	Litex Lovech	2Q	(Poland) Widzew Łódź	4–1	1–4	5–5 (2–3 p.)
2000–01	Levski Sofia	1Q	(Luxembourg) F91 Dudelange	2–0	4–0	6–0
2000–01	Levski Sofia	2Q	(Turkey) Beşiktaş	1–1	0–1	1–2
2001–02	Levski Sofia	1Q	(Bosnia and Herzegovina) Željezničar	4–0	0–0	4–0
2001–02	Levski Sofia	2Q	(Norway) Brann	0–0	1–1	1–1 (a)
2001–02	Levski Sofia	3Q	(Turkey) Galatasaray	1–1	1–2	2–3
2002–03	Levski Sofia	2Q	(Latvia) Skonto	2–0	0–0	2–0
2002–03	Levski Sofia	3Q	(Ukraine) Dynamo Kyiv	0–1	0–1	0–2
2003–04	CSKA Sofia	2Q	(Armenia) Pyunik	1–0	2–0	3–0
2003–04	CSKA Sofia	3Q	(Turkey) Galatasaray	0–3	0–3	0–6
2004–05	Lokomotiv Plovdiv	2Q	(Belgium) Club Brugge	0–4	0–2	0–6
2005–06	CSKA Sofia	2Q	(Albania) KF Tirana	2–0	2–0	4–0
2005–06	CSKA Sofia	3Q	(England) Liverpool	1–3	1–0	2–3
2006–07	Levski Sofia	2Q	(Georgia (country)) Sioni Bolnisi	2–0	2–0	4–0
2006–07	Levski Sofia	3Q	(Italy) Chievo	2–0	2–2	4–2
2006–07	Levski Sofia	Group A	(Spain) Barcelona	0–2	0–5	4th
2006–07	Levski Sofia	Group A	(England) Chelsea	1–3	0–2	4th
2006–07	Levski Sofia	Group A	(Germany) Werder Bremen	0–3	0–2	4th
2007–08	Levski Sofia	2Q	(Finland) Tampere United	0–1	0–1	0–2
2008–09	Levski Sofia	3Q	(Belarus) BATE Borisov	0–1	1–1	1–2
2009–10	Levski Sofia	2Q	(Andorra) Sant Julià	4–0	5–0	9–0
2009–10	Levski Sofia	3Q	(Azerbaijan) Baku	2–0	0–0	2–0
2009–10	Levski Sofia	PO	(Hungary) Debrecen	1–2	0–2	1–4
2010–11	Litex Lovech	2Q	(Montenegro) Rudar Pljevlja	1–0	4–0	5–0
2010–11	Litex Lovech	3Q	(Slovakia) Žilina	1–1	1–3	2–4
2011–12	Litex Lovech	2Q	(Montenegro) Mogren	3–0	2–1	5–1
2011–12	Litex Lovech	3Q	(Poland) Wisła Kraków	1–2	1–3	2–5
2012–13	Ludogorets Razgrad	2Q	(Croatia) Dinamo Zagreb	1–1	2–3	3–4
2013–14	Ludogorets Razgrad	2Q	(Slovakia) Slovan Bratislava	3–0	1–2	4–2
2013–14	Ludogorets Razgrad	3Q	(Serbia) Partizan	2–1	1–0	3–1
2013–14	Ludogorets Razgrad	PO	(Switzerland) Basel	2–4	0–2	2–6
2014–15	Ludogorets Razgrad	2Q	(Luxembourg) F91 Dudelange	4–0	1–1	5–1
2014–15	Ludogorets Razgrad	3Q	(Serbia) Partizan	0–0	2–2	2–2 (a)
2014–15	Ludogorets Razgrad	PO	(Romania) Steaua București	1–0	0–1	1–1 (6–5 p.)
2014–15	Ludogorets Razgrad	Group B	(Spain) Real Madrid	1–2	0–4	4th
2014–15	Ludogorets Razgrad	Group B	(Switzerland) Basel	1–0	0–4	4th
2014–15	Ludogorets Razgrad	Group B	(England) Liverpool	2–2	1–2	4th
2015–16	Ludogorets Razgrad	2Q	(Moldova) Milsami Orhei	0–1	1–2	1–3
2016–17	Ludogorets Razgrad	2Q	(Montenegro) Mladost Podgorica	2–0	3–0	5–0
2016–17	Ludogorets Razgrad	3Q	(Serbia) Red Star Belgrade	2–2	4–2	6–4 (a.e.t.)
2016–17	Ludogorets Razgrad	PO	(Czech Republic) Viktoria Plzeň	2–0	2–2	4–2
2016–17	Ludogorets Razgrad	Group A	(France) Paris Saint-Germain	1–3	2–2	3rd
2016–17	Ludogorets Razgrad	Group A	(England) Arsenal	2–3	0–6	3rd
2016–17	Ludogorets Razgrad	Group A	(Switzerland) Basel	0–0	1–1	3rd
2017–18	Ludogorets Razgrad	2Q	(Lithuania) Žalgiris	4–1	1–2	5–3
2017–18	Ludogorets Razgrad	3Q	(Israel) Hapoel Be'er Sheva	3–1	0–2	3–3 (a)
2018–19	Ludogorets Razgrad	1Q	(Northern Ireland) Crusaders	7–0	2–0	9–0
2018–19	Ludogorets Razgrad	2Q	(Hungary) MOL Vidi	0–0	0–1	0–1
2019–20	Ludogorets Razgrad	1Q	(Hungary) Ferencváros	2−3	1−2	3−5
2020–21	Ludogorets Razgrad	1Q	(Montenegro) Budućnost Podgorica	—N/a	3−1	—N/a
2020–21	Ludogorets Razgrad	2Q	(Denmark) Midtjylland	0−1	—N/a	—N/a
2021–22	Ludogorets Razgrad	1Q	(Belarus) Shakhtyor Soligorsk	1−0	1−0	2−0
2021–22	Ludogorets Razgrad	2Q	(Slovenia) Mura	3−1	0−0	3−1
2021–22	Ludogorets Razgrad	3Q	(Greece) Olympiacos	2−2	1−1	3–3 (4–1 p.)
2021–22	Ludogorets Razgrad	PO	(Sweden) Malmö	2−1	0−2	2–3
2022–23	Ludogorets Razgrad	1Q	(Montenegro) Sutjeska Nikšić	2−0	1−0	3−0
2022–23	Ludogorets Razgrad	2Q	(Republic of Ireland) Shamrock Rovers	3−0	1−2	4–2
2022–23	Ludogorets Razgrad	3Q	(Croatia) Dinamo Zagreb	1−2	2−4	3–6
2023–24	Ludogorets Razgrad	1Q	(Kosovo) Ballkani	4−0	0−2	4–2
2023–24	Ludogorets Razgrad	2Q	(Slovenia) Olimpija Ljubljana	1–1	1–2	2-3
2024–25	Ludogorets Razgrad	1Q	(Georgia (country)) Dinamo Batumi	3–1	0–1	3–2
2024–25	Ludogorets Razgrad	2Q	(Belarus) Dinamo Minsk	2–0	0–1	2–1
2024–25	Ludogorets Razgrad	3Q	(Azerbaijan) Qarabağ	2–7	2–1	4–8 (a.e.t.)
2025–26	Ludogorets Razgrad	1Q	(Belarus) Dinamo Minsk	1–0	2–2	3–2 (a.e.t.)
2025–26	Ludogorets Razgrad	2Q	(Croatia) Rijeka	0–0	3–1	3–1 (a.e.t.)
2025–26	Ludogorets Razgrad	3Q	(Hungary) Ferencváros	0–0	0–3	0–3
2026–27	Levski Sofia	1Q	(Bosnia and Herzegovina) Borac Banja Luka	4–0	1–1	5–1
2026–27	Levski Sofia	2Q	(Romania) Universitatea Craiova	1–0	2–2	3–2
2026–27	Levski Sofia	3Q	(Kazakhstan) Kairat	1–0	1-0	2-0
2026–27	Levski Sofia	PO	(Greece) AEK Athens	0-0	0-4	0-4

Notes

- Note 1: A number of Eastern European clubs withdrew from the first two rounds when UEFA paired up all of the Eastern European clubs against one another due to the Warsaw Pact invasion of Czechoslovakia.
- Note 2: Botev Plovdiv took the place of Levski Sofia as, following riots during the Bulgarian Cup final, the Sofia club was barred from entering European competitions.
- Note 3: Bulgarian clubs did not enter the Champions League during these seasons due to the restructuring of the competition by UEFA, with entry limited to Europe's top 24 countries. The Bulgarian league champions entered the UEFA Cup instead.

=== UEFA Cup / Europa League ===
Season	Club	Round	Opponent	Home	Away	Aggregate
UEFA Cup
1971–72	Botev Vratsa	1R	(Socialist Federal Republic of Yugoslavia) Dinamo Zagreb	1–2	1–6	2–8
1971–72	Lokomotiv Plovdiv	1R	(East Germany) Carl Zeiss Jena	3–1	0–3	3–4
1972–73	Beroe Stara Zagora	1R	Austria Wien	7–0	3–1	10–1
1972–73	Beroe Stara Zagora	2R	(Hungary) Budapest Honvéd	3–0	0–1	3–1
1972–73	Beroe Stara Zagora	3R	(Socialist Federal Republic of Yugoslavia) OFK Beograd	0–0	1–3	1–3
1972–73	Levski Sofia	1R	(Romania) Universitatea Cluj	5–1	1–4	6–5
1972–73	Levski Sofia	2R	(East Germany) BFC Dynamo	2–0	0–3	2–3
1973–74	Lokomotiv Plovdiv	1R	(Malta) Sliema Wanderers	1–0	2–0	3–0
1973–74	Lokomotiv Plovdiv	2R	(Hungary) Budapest Honvéd	3–4	2–3	5–7
1973–74	Slavia Sofia	1R	(Soviet Union) Dinamo Tbilisi	2–0	1–4	3–4
1974–75	Etar Veliko Tarnovo	1R	(Italy) Inter Milan	0–0	0–3	0–3
1974–75	Lokomotiv Plovdiv	1R	(Hungary) Győri ETO	3–1	1–3	4–4 (4–5 p.)
1975–76	Dunav Ruse	1R	(Italy) Roma	1–0	0–2	1–2
1975–76	Levski Sofia	1R	(Turkey) Eskişehirspor	3–0	4–1	7–1
1975–76	Levski Sofia	2R	(West Germany) MSV Duisburg	2–1	2–3	4–4 (a)
1975–76	Levski Sofia	3R	(Netherlands) Ajax Amsterdam	2–1	1–2	3–3 (5–3 p.)
1975–76	Levski Sofia	QF	(Spain) Barcelona	5–4	0–4	5–8
1976–77	Akademik Sofia	1R	(Czech Republic) Slavia Prague	3–0	0–2	3–2
1976–77	Akademik Sofia	2R	(Italy) Milan	4–3	0–2	4–5
1976–77	Lokomotiv Plovdiv	1R	(Socialist Federal Republic of Yugoslavia) Red Star Belgrade	2–1	1–4	3–5
1977–78	CSKA Sofia	1R	(Switzerland) Zürich	1–1	0–1	1–2 (a.e.t.)
1977–78	Marek Dupnitsa	1R	(Hungary) Ferencváros	3–0	0–2	3–2
1977–78	Marek Dupnitsa	2R	(Germany) Bayern Munich	2–0	0–3	2–3
1978–79	Botev Plovdiv	1R	(Germany) Hertha Berlin	1–2	0–0	1–2
1978–79	CSKA Sofia	1R	(Spain) Valencia	2–1	1–4	3–5
1978–79	Levski Sofia	1R	(Greece) Olympiacos	3–1	1–2	4–3 (a.e.t.)
1978–79	Levski Sofia	2R	(Italy) Milan	1–1	0–3	1–4
1979–80	CSKA Sofia	1R	(Soviet Union) Dynamo Kyiv	1–1	1–2	2–3
1979–80	Lokomotiv Sofia	1R	(Hungary) Ferencváros	3–0	0–2	3–2
1979–80	Lokomotiv Sofia	2R	(France) Monaco	4–2	1–2	5–4
1979–80	Lokomotiv Sofia	3R	(Soviet Union) Dynamo Kyiv	1–0	1–2	2–2 (a)
1979–80	Lokomotiv Sofia	QF	(West Germany) Stuttgart	0–1	1–3	1–4
1980–81	Beroe Stara Zagora	1R	(Turkey) Fenerbahçe	1–0	2–1	3–1
1980–81	Beroe Stara Zagora	2R	(Socialist Federal Republic of Yugoslavia) Radnički Niš	0–1	1–2	1–3
1980–81	Levski Sofia	1R	(Soviet Union) Dynamo Kyiv	0–0	1–1	1–1 (a)
1980–81	Levski Sofia	2R	(Netherlands) AZ Alkmaar	1–1	0–5	1–6
1981–82	Akademik Sofia	1R	(Germany) Kaiserslautern	0–1	1–2	1–3
1981–82	Levski Sofia	1R	(Romania) Dinamo Bucureşti	2–1	0–3	2–4
1982–83	Levski Sofia	1R	(Spain) Sevilla	0–3	1–3	1–6
1982–83	Slavia Sofia	1R	(Socialist Federal Republic of Yugoslavia) Sarajevo	2–2	2–4	4–6
1983–84	Levski Sofia	1R	(West Germany) Stuttgart	1–0	1–1	2–1
1983–84	Levski Sofia	2R	(England) Watford	1–3	1–1	2–4 (a.e.t.)
1983–84	Lokomotiv Plovdiv	1R	(Greece) PAOK	1–2	1–3	2–5
1984–85	CSKA Sofia	1R	(France) Monaco	2–1	2–2	4–3
1984–85	CSKA Sofia	2R	(West Germany) Hamburg	1–2	0–4	1–6
1984–85	Sliven	1R	(Socialist Federal Republic of Yugoslavia) Željezničar	1–0	1–5	2–5
1985–86	Lokomotiv Sofia	1R	(Cyprus) APOEL	4–2	2–2	6–4 (a.e.t.)
1985–86	Lokomotiv Sofia	2R	(Switzerland) Neuchâtel Xamax	1–1	0–0	1–1 (a)
1985–86	Pirin Blagoevgrad	1R	(Sweden) Hammarby	1–3	0–4	1–7
1986–87	CSKA Sofia	1R	(Austria) Swarovski Tirol	2–0	0–3	2–3
1986–87	Trakia Plovdiv	1R	(Malta) Hibernians	8–0	2–0	10–0
1986–87	Trakia Plovdiv	2R	(Socialist Federal Republic of Yugoslavia) Hajduk Split	2–2	1–3	3–5
1987–88	Lokomotiv Sofia	1R	(Soviet Union) Dinamo Tbilisi	3–1	0–3	3–4
1987–88	Trakia Plovdiv	1R	(Socialist Federal Republic of Yugoslavia) Red Star Belgrade	2–2	0–3	2–5
1988–89	Slavia Sofia	1R	(Socialist Federal Republic of Yugoslavia) Partizan	0–5	0–5	0–10
1988–89	Trakia Plovdiv	1R	(Soviet Union) Dinamo Minsk	1–2	0–0	1–2
1989–90	Levski Sofia	1R	(Belgium) Antwerp	0–0	3–4	3–4
1990–91	Slavia Sofia	1R	(Cyprus) Omonia	2–1	2–4	4–5 (a.e.t.)
1991–92	CSKA Sofia	1R	(Italy) Parma	0–0	1–1	1–1 (a)
1991–92	CSKA Sofia	2R	(Germany) Hamburg	1–4	0–2	1–6
1991–92	Slavia Sofia	1R	(Spain) Osasuna	1–0	0–4	1–4
1992–93	Botev Plovdiv	1R	(Turkey) Fenerbahçe	2–2	1–3	3–5
1992–93	Lokomotiv Plovdiv	1R	(France) Auxerre	2–2	1–7	3–9
1993–94	Botev Plovdiv	1R	(Greece) Olympiacos	2–3	1–5	3–8
1993–94	Lokomotiv Plovdiv	1R	(Italy) Lazio	0–2	0–2	0–4
1994–95	CSKA Sofia	PR	(Armenia) Ararat Yerevan	3–0	0–0	3–0
1994–95	CSKA Sofia	1R	(Italy) Juventus	3–2	1–5	4–7
1994–95	Levski Sofia	PR	(Slovenia) Olimpija Ljubljana	1–2	2–3	3–5
1994–95	Shumen	PR	(Cyprus) Anorthosis Famagusta	1–2	0–2	1–4
1995–96	Botev Plovdiv	PR	(Georgia (country)) Dinamo Tbilisi	1–0	1–0	2–0
1995–96	Botev Plovdiv	1R	(Spain) Sevilla	1–1	0–2	1–3
1995–96	Levski Sofia	PR	(Romania) Dinamo Bucureşti	1–1	1–0	2–1 (a.e.t.)
1995–96	Levski Sofia	1R	(Belgium) Eendracht Aalst	1–2	0–1	1–3
1995–96	Slavia Sofia	PR	(Greece) Olympiacos	0–2	0–1	0–3
1996–97	Lokomotiv Sofia	PR	(Azerbaijan) Neftchi Baku	6–0	1–2	7–2
1996–97	Lokomotiv Sofia	QR	(Romania) Rapid București	0–1	0–1	0–2
1996–97	Slavia Sofia	PR	(Lithuania) Inkaras Kaunas	4–3	1–1	5–4
1996–97	Slavia Sofia	QR	(Austria) Tirol Innsbruck	1–1	1–4	2–5
1997–98	Naftex Burgas	1Q	(Norway) Brann	3–2	1–2	4–4 (a)
1998–99	CSKA Sofia	1Q	(Belarus) Belshina Bobruisk	3–1	0–0	3–1
1998–99	CSKA Sofia	2Q	(Norway) Molde	2–0	0–0	2–0
1998–99	CSKA Sofia	1R	(Switzerland) Servette	1–0	1–2	2–2 (a)
1998–99	CSKA Sofia	2R	(Spain) Atlético Madrid	2–4	0–1	2–5
1998–99	Litex Lovech	1R	(Austria) Grazer AK	1–1	0–2	1–3
1999–00	CSKA Sofia	QR	(Northern Ireland) Portadown	5–0	3–0	8–0
1999–00	CSKA Sofia	1R	(England) Newcastle United	0–2	2–2	2–4
1999–00	Levski Sofia	QR	(Cyprus) APOEL	2–0	0–0	2–0
1999–00	Levski Sofia	1R	(Croatia) Hajduk Split	3–0	0–0	3–0
1999–00	Levski Sofia	2R	(Italy) Juventus	1–3	1–1	2–4
2000–01	CSKA Sofia	QR	(Moldova) Constructorul Chișinău	8–0	3–2	11–2
2000–01	CSKA Sofia	1R	(Hungary) MTK Hungária	1–2	1–0	2–2 (a)
2000–01	Naftex Burgas	QR	(Cyprus) Omonia	2–1	0–0	2–1
2000–01	Naftex Burgas	1R	(Russia) Lokomotiv Moscow	2–4	0–0	2–4
2001–02	CSKA Sofia	QR	(Belarus) Shakhtyor Soligorsk	3–1	2–1	5–2
2001–02	CSKA Sofia	1R	(Ukraine) Shakhtar Donetsk	3–0	1–2	4–2
2001–02	CSKA Sofia	2R	(Italy) Milan	0–1	0–2	0–3
2001–02	Levski Sofia	1R	(England) Chelsea	0–2	0–3	0–5
2001–02	Litex Lovech	QR	(Republic of Ireland) Longford Town	2–0	1–1	3–1
2001–02	Litex Lovech	1R	(Slovakia) Inter Bratislava	3–0	0–1	3–1
2001–02	Litex Lovech	2R	(Germany) Union Berlin	0–0	2–0	2–0
2001–02	Litex Lovech	3R	(Greece) AEK Athens	1–1	2–3	3–4
2002–03	CSKA Sofia	QR	(Belarus) Dinamo Minsk	1–0	4–1	5–1
2002–03	CSKA Sofia	1R	(England) Blackburn Rovers	3–3	1–1	4–4 (a)
2002–03	Levski Sofia	1R	(Denmark) Brøndby	4–1	1–1	5–2
2002–03	Levski Sofia	2R	(Austria) Sturm Graz	1–0	0–1	1–1 (7–8 p.)
2002–03	Litex Lovech	QR	(Lithuania) Atlantas	5–0	3–1	8–1
2002–03	Litex Lovech	1R	(Greece) Panathinaikos	0–1	1–2	1–3 (a.e.t.)
2003–04	CSKA Sofia	1R	(Russia) Torpedo Moscow	1–1	1–1	2–2 (2–3 p.)
2003–04	Levski Sofia	QR	(Kazakhstan) Atyrau	2–0	4–1	6–1
2003–04	Levski Sofia	1R	(Israel) Hapoel Ramat Gan	4–0	1–0	5–0
2003–04	Levski Sofia	2R	(Czech Republic) Slavia Prague	0–0	2–2	2–2 (a)
2003–04	Levski Sofia	3R	(England) Liverpool	2–4	0–2	2–6
2003–04	Litex Lovech	QR	(Moldova) Zimbru Chişinău	0–0	0–2	0–2
2004–05	CSKA Sofia	2Q	(Cyprus) Omonia	3–1	1–1	4–2 (a.e.t.)
2004–05	CSKA Sofia	1R	(Romania) Steaua București	2–2	1–2	3–4
2004–05	Levski Sofia	2Q	(Bosnia and Herzegovina) Modriča	5–0	3–0	8–0
2004–05	Levski Sofia	1R	(Belgium) Beveren	1–1	0–1	1–2
2004–05	Litex Lovech	2Q	(Bosnia and Herzegovina) Željezničar	7–0	2–1	9–1
2004–05	Litex Lovech	1R	(Austria) Grazer AK	1–0	0–5	1–5
2005–06	CSKA Sofia	1R	(Germany) Bayer Leverkusen	1–0	1–0	2–0
2005–06	CSKA Sofia	Group A	(Germany) Hamburg	0–1	—N/a	5th
2005–06	CSKA Sofia	Group A	(Czech Republic) Slavia Prague	—N/a	2–4	5th
2005–06	CSKA Sofia	Group A	(Norway) Viking	2–0	—N/a	5th
2005–06	CSKA Sofia	Group A	(France) Monaco	—N/a	1–2	5th
2005–06	Levski Sofia	2Q	(Slovenia) Publikum	3–0	0–1	3–1
2005–06	Levski Sofia	1R	(France) Auxerre	1–0	1–2	2–2 (a)
2005–06	Levski Sofia	Group F	(Romania) Dinamo Bucureşti	1–0	—N/a	2nd
2005–06	Levski Sofia	Group F	(Russia) CSKA Moscow	—N/a	1–2	2nd
2005–06	Levski Sofia	Group F	(France) Marseille	1–0	—N/a	2nd
2005–06	Levski Sofia	Group F	(Netherlands) Heerenveen	—N/a	1–2	2nd
2005–06	Levski Sofia	R32	(Slovakia) Artmedia Bratislava	2–0	1–0	3–0
2005–06	Levski Sofia	R16	(Italy) Udinese	2–1	0–0	2–1
2005–06	Levski Sofia	QF	(Germany) Schalke 04	1–3	1–1	2–4
2005–06	Litex Lovech	2Q	(Croatia) Rijeka	1–0	1–2	2–2 (a)
2005–06	Litex Lovech	1R	(Belgium) Genk	2–2	1–0	3–2
2005–06	Litex Lovech	Group D	(Switzerland) Grasshopper	2–1	—N/a	3rd
2005–06	Litex Lovech	Group D	(Ukraine) Dnipro	—N/a	2–0	3rd
2005–06	Litex Lovech	Group D	(Netherlands) AZ	0–2	—N/a	3rd
2005–06	Litex Lovech	Group D	(England) Middlesbrough	—N/a	0–2	3rd
2005–06	Litex Lovech	R32	(France) Strasbourg	0–2	0–0	0–2
2005–06	Lokomotiv Plovdiv	2Q	(Serbia and Montenegro) OFK Beograd	1−0	1−2	2−2 (a)
2005–06	Lokomotiv Plovdiv	1R	(England) Bolton Wanderers	1–2	1–2	2–4
2006–07	CSKA Sofia	1Q	(Albania) Dinamo Tirana	4–1	1–0	5–1
2006–07	CSKA Sofia	2Q	(Serbia) Hajduk Kula	0–0	1–1	1–1 (a)
2006–07	CSKA Sofia	1R	(Turkey) Beşiktaş	2–2	0–2	2–4 (a.e.t.)
2006–07	Litex Lovech	1Q	(Slovenia) Koper	5–0	1–0	6–0
2006–07	Litex Lovech	2Q	(Cyprus) Omonia	2–1	0–0	2–1
2006–07	Litex Lovech	1R	(Israel) Maccabi Haifa	1–3	1–1	2–4
2006–07	Lokomotiv Sofia	1Q	(North Macedonia) Makedonija GP	2–0	1–1	3–1
2006–07	Lokomotiv Sofia	2Q	(Israel) Bnei Yehuda	4–0	2–0	6–0
2006–07	Lokomotiv Sofia	1R	(Netherlands) Feyenoord	2–2	0–0	2–2 (a)
2007–08	CSKA Sofia	2Q	(Cyprus) Omonia	2–1	1–1	3–2
2007–08	CSKA Sofia	1R	(France) Toulouse	1–1	0–0	1–1 (a)
2007–08	Litex Lovech	1Q	(Malta) Sliema Wanderers	4–0	3–0	7–0
2007–08	Litex Lovech	2Q	(Albania) Besa Kavajë	3–0	3–0	6–0
2007–08	Litex Lovech	1R	(Germany) Hamburg	0–1	1–3	1–4
2007–08	Lokomotiv Sofia	2Q	(Romania) Oţelul Galaţi	3–1	0–0	3–1
2007–08	Lokomotiv Sofia	1R	(France) Rennes	1–3	2–1	3–4
2008–09	Cherno More Varna	1Q	(Andorra) Sant Julià	4–0	5–0	9–0
2008–09	Cherno More Varna	2Q	(Israel) Maccabi Netanya	2–0	1–1	3–1
2008–09	Cherno More Varna	1R	(Germany) Stuttgart	1–2	2–2	3–4
2008–09	Levski Sofia	1R	(Slovakia) Žilina	0–1	1–1	1–2
2008–09	Litex Lovech	2Q	(Israel) Ironi Kiryat Shmona	0–0	2–1	2–1
2008–09	Litex Lovech	1R	(England) Aston Villa	1–3	1–1	2–4
2008–09	Lokomotiv Sofia	2Q	(Serbia) Borac Čačak	1–1	0–1	1–2
UEFA Europa League
2009–10	Cherno More Varna	2Q	(Moldova) Iskra-Stal Rîbnița	1–0	3–0	4–0
2009–10	Cherno More Varna	3Q	(Netherlands) PSV Eindhoven	0–1	0–1	0–2
2009–10	CSKA Sofia	3Q	(Republic of Ireland) Derry City	1–0	1–1	2–1
2009–10	CSKA Sofia	PO	(Russia) Dynamo Moscow	0–0	2–1	2–1
2009–10	CSKA Sofia	Group E	(England) Fulham	1–1	0–1	4th
2009–10	CSKA Sofia	Group E	(Italy) Roma	0–3	0–2	4th
2009–10	CSKA Sofia	Group E	(Switzerland) Basel	0–2	1–3	4th
2009–10	Levski Sofia	Group G	(Spain) Villarreal	0–2	0–1	4th
2009–10	Levski Sofia	Group G	(Italy) Lazio	0–4	1–0	4th
2009–10	Levski Sofia	Group G	(Austria) Red Bull Salzburg	0–1	0–1	4th
2009–10	Litex Lovech	PO	(Belarus) BATE Borisov	0–4	1–0	1–4
2010–11	Beroe Stara Zagora	3Q	(Austria) Rapid Wien	1–1	0–3	1–4
2010–11	CSKA Sofia	3Q	(Northern Ireland) Cliftonville	3–0	2–1	5–1
2010–11	CSKA Sofia	PO	(Wales) The New Saints	3–0	2–2	5–2
2010–11	CSKA Sofia	Group L	(Turkey) Beşiktaş	1–2	0–1	4th
2010–11	CSKA Sofia	Group L	(Portugal) Porto	0–1	1–3	4th
2010–11	CSKA Sofia	Group L	(Austria) Rapid Wien	0–2	2–1	4th
2010–11	Levski Sofia	2Q	(Republic of Ireland) Dundalk	6–0	2–0	8–0
2010–11	Levski Sofia	3Q	(Sweden) Kalmar FF	5–2	1–1	6–3
2010–11	Levski Sofia	PO	(Sweden) AIK	2–1	0–0	2–1
2010–11	Levski Sofia	Group C	(Belgium) Gent	3–2	0–1	4th
2010–11	Levski Sofia	Group C	(Portugal) Sporting CP	1–0	0–5	4th
2010–11	Levski Sofia	Group C	(France) Lille	2–2	0–1	4th
2010–11	Litex Lovech	PO	(Hungary) Debrecen	1–2	0–2	1–4
2011–12	CSKA Sofia	PO	(Romania) Steaua București	1–1	0–2	1–3
2011–12	Levski Sofia	3Q	(Slovakia) Spartak Trnava	2–1	1–2	3–3 (4–5 p.)
2011–12	Litex Lovech	PO	(Ukraine) Dynamo Kyiv	1–2	0–1	1–3
2011–12	Lokomotiv Sofia	2Q	(North Macedonia) Metalurg Skopje	3–2	0–0	3–2
2011–12	Lokomotiv Sofia	3Q	(Poland) Śląsk Wrocław	0–0	0–0	0–0 (3–4 p.)
2012–13	CSKA Sofia	2Q	(Slovenia) Mura 05	1–1	0–0	1–1 (a)
2012–13	Levski Sofia	2Q	(Bosnia and Herzegovina) Sarajevo	1–0	1–3	2–3
2012–13	Lokomotiv Plovdiv	2Q	(Netherlands) Vitesse	4–4	1–3	5–7
2013–14	Beroe Stara Zagora	2Q	(Israel) Hapoel Tel Aviv	1–4	2–2	3–6
2013–14	Botev Plovdiv	1Q	(Kazakhstan) Astana	5–0	1–0	6–0
2013–14	Botev Plovdiv	2Q	(Bosnia and Herzegovina) Zrinjski Mostar	2–0	1–1	3–1
2013–14	Botev Plovdiv	3Q	(Germany) Stuttgart	1–1	0–0	1–1 (a)
2013–14	Levski Sofia	1Q	(Kazakhstan) Irtysh Pavlodar	0–0	0–2	0–2
2013–14	Ludogorets Razgrad	Group B	(Netherlands) PSV	2–0	2–0	1st
2013–14	Ludogorets Razgrad	Group B	(Croatia) Dinamo Zagreb	3–0	2–1	1st
2013–14	Ludogorets Razgrad	Group B	(Ukraine) Chornomorets Odesa	1–1	1–0	1st
2013–14	Ludogorets Razgrad	R32	(Italy) Lazio	3–3	1–0	4–3
2013–14	Ludogorets Razgrad	R16	(Spain) Valencia	0–3	0–1	0–4
2014–15	Botev Plovdiv	1Q	(San Marino) Libertas	4–0	2–0	6–0
2014–15	Botev Plovdiv	2Q	(Austria) St. Pölten	2–1	0–2	2–3
2014–15	CSKA Sofia	2Q	(Moldova) Zimbru Chișinău	1–1	0–0	1–1 (a)
2014–15	Litex Lovech	1Q	(Moldova) Veris Chișinău	3–0	0–0	3–0
2014–15	Litex Lovech	2Q	(Hungary) Diósgyőr	0–2	2–1	2–3
2015–16	Beroe Stara Zagora	1Q	(Lithuania) Atlantas	3–1	2–0	5–1
2015–16	Beroe Stara Zagora	2Q	(Denmark) Brøndby	0–1	0–0	0–1
2015–16	Cherno More Varna	2Q	(Belarus) Dinamo Minsk	1–1	0–4	1–5
2015–16	Litex Lovech	1Q	(Latvia) Jelgava	2–2	1–1	3–3 (a)
2016–17	Beroe Stara Zagora	1Q	(Bosnia and Herzegovina) Radnik Bijeljina	0–0	2–0	2–0
2016–17	Beroe Stara Zagora	2Q	(Finland) HJK	1–1	0–1	1–2
2016–17	Levski Sofia	2Q	(Slovenia) Maribor	1–1	0–0	1–1 (a)
2016–17	Ludogorets Razgrad	R32	(Denmark) Copenhagen	1–2	0–0	1–2
2016–17	Slavia Sofia	1Q	(Poland) Zagłębie Lubin	1–0	0–3	1–3
2017–18	Botev Plovdiv	1Q	(Albania) Partizani Tirana	1–0	3–1	4–1
2017–18	Botev Plovdiv	2Q	(Israel) Beitar Jerusalem	4–0	1–1	5–1
2017–18	Botev Plovdiv	3Q	(Portugal) Marítimo	0–0	0–2	0–2
2017–18	Dunav Ruse	1Q	(Kazakhstan) Irtysh Pavlodar	0–2	0–1	0–3
2017–18	Levski Sofia	1Q	(Montenegro) Sutjeska Nikšić	3–1	0–0	3–1
2017–18	Levski Sofia	2Q	(Croatia) Hajduk Split	1–2	0–1	1–3
2017–18	Ludogorets Razgrad	PO	(Lithuania) Sūduva Marijampolė	2–0	0–0	2–0
2017–18	Ludogorets Razgrad	Group C	(Portugal) Braga	1–1	2–0	2nd
2017–18	Ludogorets Razgrad	Group C	(Germany) 1899 Hoffenheim	2–1	1–1	2nd
2017–18	Ludogorets Razgrad	Group C	(Turkey) Istanbul Başakşehir	1–2	0–0	2nd
2017–18	Ludogorets Razgrad	R32	(Italy) Milan	0–3	0–1	0–4
2018–19	CSKA Sofia	1Q	(Latvia) Riga FC	1–0	0–1	1–1 (5–3 p.)
2018–19	CSKA Sofia	2Q	(Austria) Admira Wacker	3–0	3–1	6–1
2018–19	CSKA Sofia	3Q	(Denmark) Copenhagen	1–2	1–2	2–4
2018–19	Levski Sofia	1Q	(Liechtenstein) Vaduz	3–2	0–1	3–3 (a)
2018–19	Ludogorets Razgrad	3Q	(Bosnia and Herzegovina) Zrinjski Mostar	1–0	1–1	2–1
2018–19	Ludogorets Razgrad	PO	(Georgia (country)) Torpedo Kutaisi	4–0	1–0	5–0
2018–19	Ludogorets Razgrad	Group A	(Germany) Bayer Leverkusen	2–3	1–1	4th
2018–19	Ludogorets Razgrad	Group A	(Switzerland) Zürich	1–1	0–1	4th
2018–19	Ludogorets Razgrad	Group A	(Cyprus) AEK Larnaca	0–0	1–1	4th
2018–19	Slavia Sofia	1Q	(Finland) Ilves	2–1	1–0	3–1
2018–19	Slavia Sofia	2Q	(Croatia) Hajduk Split	2–3	0–1	2–4
2019–20	CSKA Sofia	1Q	(Montenegro) OFK Titograd	4−0	0−0	4−0
2019–20	CSKA Sofia	2Q	(Croatia) Osijek	1−0	0−1	1–1 (4–3 p.)
2019–20	CSKA Sofia	3Q	(Ukraine) Zorya Luhansk	1−1	0−1	1–2
2019–20	Levski Sofia	1Q	(Slovakia) Ružomberok	2–0	2–0	4–0
2019–20	Levski Sofia	2Q	(Cyprus) AEK Larnaca	0–4	0–3	0–7
2019–20	Lokomotiv Plovdiv	2Q	(Slovakia) Spartak Trnava	2−0	1–3	3–3 (a)
2019–20	Lokomotiv Plovdiv	3Q	(France) Strasbourg	0–1	0–1	0–2
2019–20	Ludogorets Razgrad	2Q	(Iceland) Valur	4–0	1–1	5–1
2019–20	Ludogorets Razgrad	3Q	(Wales) The New Saints	5–0	4–0	9–0
2019–20	Ludogorets Razgrad	PO	(Slovenia) Maribor	0–0	2–2	2–2 (a)
2019–20	Ludogorets Razgrad	Group H	(Russia) CSKA Moscow	5–1	1–1	2nd
2019–20	Ludogorets Razgrad	Group H	(Hungary) Ferencváros	1–1	3–0	2nd
2019–20	Ludogorets Razgrad	Group H	(Spain) Espanyol	0–1	0–6	2nd
2019–20	Ludogorets Razgrad	R32	(Italy) Inter Milan	0–2	1–2	1–4
2020–21	CSKA Sofia	1Q	(Malta) Sirens	2–1	—N/a	—N/a
2020–21	CSKA Sofia	2Q	(Belarus) BATE Borisov	2–0	—N/a	—N/a
2020–21	CSKA Sofia	3Q	(Faroe Islands) B36 Tórshavn	2–0	—N/a	—N/a
2020–21	CSKA Sofia	PO	(Switzerland) Basel	—N/a	3–1	—N/a
2020–21	CSKA Sofia	Group A	(Romania) CFR Cluj	0–2	0–0	4th
2020–21	CSKA Sofia	Group A	(Italy) Roma	3–1	0–0	4th
2020–21	CSKA Sofia	Group A	(Switzerland) Young Boys	0–1	0–3	4th
2020–21	Lokomotiv Plovdiv	1Q	(Montenegro) Iskra	—N/a	1–0	—N/a
2020–21	Lokomotiv Plovdiv	2Q	(England) Tottenham Hotspur	1–2	—N/a	—N/a
2020–21	Ludogorets Razgrad	3Q	Bye	—N/a	—N/a	—N/a
2020–21	Ludogorets Razgrad	PO	(Belarus) Dynamo Brest	—N/a	2–0	—N/a
2020–21	Ludogorets Razgrad	Group J	(Belgium) Royal Antwerp	1–2	1–3	4th
2020–21	Ludogorets Razgrad	Group J	(Austria) LASK	1–3	3–4	4th
2020–21	Ludogorets Razgrad	Group J	(England) Tottenham Hotspur	1–3	0–4	4th
2020–21	Slavia Sofia	1Q	(Albania) Kukësi	—N/a	1–2	—N/a
2021–22	Ludogorets Razgrad	Group F	(Serbia) Red Star Belgrade	0–1	0–1	4th
2021–22	Ludogorets Razgrad	Group F	(Portugal) Braga	0–1	2–4	4th
2021–22	Ludogorets Razgrad	Group F	(Denmark) Midtjylland	0–0	1–1	4th
2022–23	Ludogorets Razgrad	PO	(Lithuania) Žalgiris	1–0	3–3	4–3 (a.e.t.)
2022–23	Ludogorets Razgrad	Group C	(Italy) Roma	2–1	1–3	3rd
2022–23	Ludogorets Razgrad	Group C	(Spain) Real Betis	0–1	2–3	3rd
2022–23	Ludogorets Razgrad	Group C	(Finland) HJK	2–0	1–1	3rd
2023–24	Ludogorets Razgrad	Q3	(Kazakhstan) Astana	5–1	1–2	6–3
2023–24	Ludogorets Razgrad	PO	(Netherlands) Ajax	1–4	1–0	2–4
2024–25	Botev Plovdiv	Q1	(Slovenia) Maribor	2–1	2–2	4-3
2024–25	Botev Plovdiv	Q2	(Greece) Panathinaikos	0–4	1–2	1-6
2024–25	Ludogorets Razgrad	PO	(Moldova) Petrocub	4–0	2–1	6-1
2024–25	Ludogorets Razgrad	League Phase	(Czech Republic) Slavia Prague	0–2	—N/a	33rd
2024–25	Ludogorets Razgrad	League Phase	(Czech Republic) Viktoria Plzeň	—N/a	0–0	33rd
2024–25	Ludogorets Razgrad	League Phase	(Belgium) Anderlecht	—N/a	0–2	33rd
2024–25	Ludogorets Razgrad	League Phase	(Spain) Athletic Bilbao	1–2	—N/a	33rd
2024–25	Ludogorets Razgrad	League Phase	(Italy) Lazio	—N/a	0-0	33rd
2024–25	Ludogorets Razgrad	League Phase	(Netherlands) AZ Alkmaar	2–2	—N/a	33rd
2024–25	Ludogorets Razgrad	League Phase	(Denmark) Midtjylland	0–2	—N/a	33rd
2024–25	Ludogorets Razgrad	League Phase	(France) Olympique Lyon	—N/a	1-1	33rd
2025–26	Levski Sofia	Q1	(Israel) Hapoel Be'er Sheva	0–0	1–1	1–1 (3–1 p.)
2025–26	Levski Sofia	Q2	(Portugal) Braga	0–0	0–1	0–1 (a.e.t.)
2025–26	Ludogorets Razgrad	PO	(North Macedonia) Shkëndija	4–1	1–2	5–3 (a.e.t.)
2025–26	Ludogorets Razgrad	League Phase	(Sweden) Malmö FF	—N/a	2-1	22nd
2025–26	Ludogorets Razgrad	League Phase	(Spain) Real Betis	0–2	—N/a	22nd
2025–26	Ludogorets Razgrad	League Phase	(Switzerland) Young Boys	—N/a	2–3	22nd
2025–26	Ludogorets Razgrad	League Phase	(Hungary) Ferencváros	—N/a	1–3	22nd
2025–26	Ludogorets Razgrad	League Phase	(Spain) Celta Vigo	3–2	—N/a	22nd
2025–26	Ludogorets Razgrad	League Phase	(Greece) PAOK	3–3	—N/a	22nd
2025–26	Ludogorets Razgrad	League Phase	(Scotland) Rangers	—N/a	0–1	22nd
2025–26	Ludogorets Razgrad	League Phase	(France) Nice	1–0	—N/a	22nd
2025–26	Ludogorets Razgrad	KP PO	(Hungary) Ferencvárosi	2-1	0-2	2-3
2026–27	CSKA Sofia	Q1	(Republic of Ireland) Derry City	3–2	2–1	5–3
2026–27	CSKA Sofia	Q2	(Azerbaijan) Qarabağ	0-0	0–0	0-0 (5-4 p.)
2026–27	CSKA Sofia	Q3	(Israel) Maccabi Tel Aviv	1-3	3-0	4-3
2026–27	CSKA Sofia	PO	(Greece) OFI	0-2	0-3	0-5
2026–27	Levski Sofia	League Phase	(Austria) Red Bull Salzburg	0-1	—N/a	-
2026–27	Levski Sofia	League Phase	(Netherlands) NEC	—N/a	1-1	-
2026–27	Levski Sofia	League Phase	(Czech Republic) Viktoria Plzeň	—N/a	2-1	-
2026–27	Levski Sofia	League Phase	(Poland) Jagiellonia Białystok	1-0	—N/a	-
2026–27	Levski Sofia	League Phase	(France) Marseille	—N/a	–	-
2026–27	Levski Sofia	League Phase	(Norway) Lillestrøm	–	—N/a	-
2026–27	Levski Sofia	League Phase	(Italy) Milan	–	—N/a	-
2026–27	Levski Sofia	League Phase	(England) Sunderland	—N/a	–	-

=== UEFA Conference League ===
Season	Club	Round	Opponent	Home	Away	Aggregate
UEFA Europa Conference League
2021–22	Arda Kardzhali	2Q	(Israel) Hapoel Be'er Sheva	0–2	0–4	0–6
2021–22	CSKA Sofia	2Q	(Latvia) Liepāja	0–0	0–0	0–0 (3–1 p.)
2021–22	CSKA Sofia	3Q	(Croatia) Osijek	4–2	1–1	5–3
2021–22	CSKA Sofia	PO	(Czech Republic) Viktoria Plzeň	3–0	0–2	3–2 (a.e.t.)
2021–22	CSKA Sofia	Group C	(Italy) Roma	2–3	1–5	4th
2021–22	CSKA Sofia	Group C	(Norway) Bodø/Glimt	0–0	0–2	4th
2021–22	CSKA Sofia	Group C	(Ukraine) Zorya Luhansk	0–1	0–2	4th
2021–22	Lokomotiv Plovdiv	2Q	(Czech Republic) Slovácko	1−0	0–1	1–1 (3–2 p.)
2021–22	Lokomotiv Plovdiv	3Q	(Denmark) Copenhagen	1–1	2–4	3–5
2022–23	Botev Plovdiv	2Q	(Cyprus) APOEL	0–0	0–2	0–2
2022–23	CSKA Sofia	2Q	(North Macedonia) Makedonija GP	4−0	0–0	4–0
2022–23	CSKA Sofia	3Q	(Republic of Ireland) St Patrick's Athletic	0–1	2–0	2–1
2022–23	CSKA Sofia	PO	(Switzerland) Basel	1−0	0–2	1–2
2022–23	Levski Sofia	2Q	(Greece) PAOK	2−0	1–1	3–1
2022–23	Levski Sofia	3Q	(Malta) Ħamrun Spartans	1–2	1−0	2–2 (1–4 p.)
2022–23	Ludogorets Razgrad	KPO	(Belgium) Anderlecht	1−0	1–2	2–2 (0–3 p.)
2023–24	CSKA 1948	2Q	(Romania) FCSB	0–1	2–3	2-4
2023–24	CSKA Sofia	2Q	(Romania) Sepsi OSK	0–4	0–2	0–6
2023–24	Levski Sofia	2Q	(North Macedonia) Shkupi	1−0	2–0	3–0
2023–24	Levski Sofia	3Q	(Israel) Hapoel Be'er Sheva	2–1	0–0	2–1
2023–24	Levski Sofia	PO	(Germany) Eintracht Frankfurt	1−1	0–2	1–3
2023–24	Ludogorets Razgrad	Group H	(Denmark) Nordsjælland	1–7	1–0	2nd
2023–24	Ludogorets Razgrad	Group H	(Turkey) Fenerbahçe	1–3	2–0	2nd
2023–24	Ludogorets Razgrad	Group H	(Slovakia) Spartak Trnava	4–0	2–1	2nd
2023–24	Ludogorets Razgrad	KPO	(Switzerland) Servette	0–1	0−0	0–1
2024–25	Cherno More	2Q	(Israel) Hapoel Be'er Sheva	1–2	0−0	1–2
2024–25	CSKA 1948	2Q	(Montenegro) Buducnost	1–0	1−1	2–1
2024–25	CSKA 1948	3Q	(Cyprus) Pafos	2–1	0–4	2–5 (a.e.t.)
2024–25	Botev Plovdiv	3Q	(Bosnia and Herzegovina) Zrinjski Mostar	2–1	0–2	2–3
2025–26	Arda Kardzhali	2Q	(Finland) HJK	0−0	2−2	2–2 (4–3 p.)
2025–26	Arda Kardzhali	3Q	(Lithuania) Kauno Žalgiris	2–0	1–0	3–0
2025–26	Arda Kardzhali	PO	(Poland) Raków Częstochowa	1–2	0–1	1–3
2025–26	Cherno More	2Q	(Turkey) Istanbul Başakşehir	0–1	0–4	0–5
2025–26	Levski Sofia	3Q	(Azerbaijan) Sabah Baku	1–0	2–0	3–0
2025–26	Levski Sofia	PO	(Netherlands) AZ Alkmaar	0–2	1–4	1–6
2026–27	CSKA 1948	2Q	(Slovakia) Spartak Trnava	0-0	0–0	0-0 (5-3 p.)
2026–27	CSKA 1948	3Q	(Greece) Panathinaikos	1-2	1-1	2-3 (a.e.t.)
2026–27	CSKA Sofia	League Phase	(France) Monaco	1-2	—N/a	-
2026–27	CSKA Sofia	League Phase	(Denmark) Nordsjælland	—N/a	2-2	-
2026–27	CSKA Sofia	League Phase	(Greece) Panathinaikos	—N/a	1-2	-
2026–27	CSKA Sofia	League Phase	(Turkey) Trabzonspor	–	—N/a	-
2026–27	CSKA Sofia	League Phase	(Finland) KuPS	—N/a	–	-
2026–27	CSKA Sofia	League Phase	(Switzerland) Thun	–	—N/a	-
2026–27	Ludogorets Razgrad	2Q	(Israel) Hapoel Tel Aviv	2-2	0–2	2-4

== Defunct competitions ==
=== Cup Winners' Cup ===
Season	Club	Round	Opponent	Home	Away	Aggregate
1961–62	Spartak Varna	PR	(Austria) Rapid Wien	2–5	0–0	2–5
1962–63	Botev Plovdiv	PR	(Romania) Steaua București	5–1	2–3	7–4
1962–63	Botev Plovdiv	1R	(Republic of Ireland) Shamrock Rovers	1–0	4–0	5–0
1962–63	Botev Plovdiv	QF	(Spain) Atlético Madrid	1–1	0–4	1–5
1963–64	Slavia Sofia	1R	(Hungary) MTK Budapest	1–1	0–1	1–2
1964–65	Slavia Sofia	1R	(Republic of Ireland) Cork Celtic	1–1	2–0	3–1
1964–65	Slavia Sofia	2R	(Switzerland) Lausanne-Sports	1–0	1–2	2–2 (2–3 Play-off)
1965–66	CSKA Sofia	1R	(Republic of Ireland) Limerick	2–0	2–1	4–1
1965–66	CSKA Sofia	2R	(West Germany) Borussia Dortmund	4–2	0–3	4–5
1966–67	Slavia Sofia	1R	(Wales) Swansea Town	4–0	1–1	5–1
1966–67	Slavia Sofia	2R	(France) Strasbourg	2–0	0–1	2–1
1966–67	Slavia Sofia	QF	(Switzerland) Servette	3–0	0–1	3–1
1966–67	Slavia Sofia	SF	(Scotland) Rangers	0–1	0–1	0–2
1967–68	Levski Sofia	1R	(Italy) Milan	1–1	1–5	2–6
1968–69	Spartak Sofia	Withdraw from the competition^{1}				
1969–70	Levski Sofia	1R	(Iceland) ÍBV	4–0	4–0	8–0
1969–70	Levski Sofia	2R	(Switzerland) St. Gallen	4–0	0–0	4–0
1969–70	Levski Sofia	QF	(Poland) Górnik Zabrze	3–2	1–2	4–4 (a)
1970–71	CSKA Sofia	1R	(Finland) Haka	9–0	2–1	11–1
1970–71	CSKA Sofia	2R	(England) Chelsea	0–1	0–1	0–2
1971–72	Levski Sofia	1R	(Netherlands) Sparta Rotterdam	1–1	0–2	1–3
1972–73	Slavia Sofia	1R	(West Germany) Schalke 04	1–3	1–2	2–5
1973–74	Beroe Stara Zagora	1R	(Luxembourg) Fola Esch	7–0	4–1	11–1
1973–74	Beroe Stara Zagora	2R	(Spain) Athletic Bilbao	3–0	0–1	3–1
1973–74	Beroe Stara Zagora	QF	(East Germany) 1. FC Magdeburg	0–2	1–1	1–3
1974–75	CSKA Sofia	1R	(Soviet Union) Dynamo Kyiv	0–1	0–1	0–2
1975–76	Slavia Sofia	1R	(Austria) Sturm Graz	1–0	1–3	2–3
1976–77	Levski Sofia	1R	(Finland) Lahden Reipas	12–2	7–1	19–3
1976–77	Levski Sofia	2R	(Portugal) Boavista	2–0	1–3	3–3 (a)
1976–77	Levski Sofia	QF	(Spain) Atlético Madrid	2–1	0–2	2–3
1977–78	FC Lokomotiv 1929 Sofia	1R	(Belgium) Anderlecht	1–6	0–2	1–8
1978–79	Marek Dupnitsa	1R	(Scotland) Aberdeen	3–2	0–3	3–5
1979–80	Beroe Stara Zagora	1R	(Poland) Arka Gdynia	2–3	2–0	4–3
1979–80	Beroe Stara Zagora	2R	(Italy) Juventus	1–0	0–3	1–3 (a.e.t.)
1980–81	Slavia Sofia	1R	(Poland) Legia Warsaw	3–1	0–1	3–2
1980–81	Slavia Sofia	2R	(Czechoslovakia) Sparta Prague	3–0	0–2	3–2
1980–81	Slavia Sofia	QF	(Netherlands) Feyenoord	3–2	0–4	3–6
1981–82	Botev Plovdiv	1R	(Spain) Barcelona	1–0	1–4	2–4
1982–83	Lokomotiv Sofia	1R	(France) Paris Saint-Germain	1–0	1–5	2–5
1983–84	Spartak Varna	1R	(Turkey) Mersin İY	1–0	0–0	1–0
1983–84	Spartak Varna	2R	(England) Manchester United	1–2	0–2	1–4
1984–85	Botev Plovdiv	1R	Union Luxembourg	4–0	1–1	5–1
1984–85	Botev Plovdiv	2R	(West Germany) Bayern Munich	2–0	1–4	3–4
1985–86	CSKA Sofia	Excluded from the competition^{2}				
1986–87	Levski Sofia	1R	(Denmark) B 1903	2–0	0–1	2–1
1986–87	Levski Sofia	2R	(Socialist Federal Republic of Yugoslavia) Velež Mostar	2–0	3–4	5–4
1986–87	Levski Sofia	QF	(Spain) Real Zaragoza	0–2	0–2	0–4
1987–88	Levski Sofia	1R	(Greece) OFI Crete	1–0	1–3	2–3
1988–89	CSKA Sofia	1R	(Czechoslovakia) Internacional Bratislava	5–0	3–2	8–2
1988–89	CSKA Sofia	2R	(Greece) Panathinaikos	2–0	1–0	3–0
1988–89	CSKA Sofia	QF	(Netherlands) Roda JC	2–1	1–2	3–3 (4–3 p.)
1988–89	CSKA Sofia	SF	(Spain) Barcelona	1–2	2–4	3–6
1989–90	FC Chernomorets	QR	(Albania) Dinamo Tirana	3–1	0–4	3–5
1990–91	Sliven	1R	(Italy) Juventus	0–2	1–6	1–8
1991–92	Levski Sofia	1R	(Hungary) Ferencváros	2–3	1–4	3–7
1992–93	Levski Sofia	1R	(Switzerland) Luzern	2–1	0–1	2–2 (a)
1993–94	CSKA Sofia	1R	(Liechtenstein) Balzers	8–0	3–1	11–1
1993–94	CSKA Sofia	2R	(Portugal) Benfica	1–3	1–3	2–6
1994–95	Pirin Blagoevgrad	QR	(Liechtenstein) Schaan	3–0	1–0	4–0
1994–95	Pirin Blagoevgrad	1R	(Greece) Panathinaikos	0–2	1–6	1–8
1995–96	Lokomotiv Sofia	QR	(Republic of Ireland) Derry City	2–0	0–1	2–1
1995–96	Lokomotiv Sofia	1R	(Sweden) Halmstad	3–1	0–2	3–3 (a)
1996–97	Levski Sofia	QR	(Slovenia) Olimpija Ljubljana	1–0	0–1	1–1 (3–4 p.)
1997–98	Levski Sofia	QR	(Slovakia) Slovan Bratislava	1–1	1–2	2–3
1998–99	Levski Sofia	QR	(Belarus) Lokomotiv-96 Vitebsk	8–1	1–1	9–2
1998–99	Levski Sofia	1R	(Denmark) Copenhagen	0–2	1–4	1–6

Notes

- Note 1: A number of Eastern European clubs withdrew following UEFA's decision to separate western and Eastern countries due to troubles in Czechoslovakia.
- Note 2: CSKA Sofia were barred from entering the European competitions after the riots during the Bulgarian Cup final.

=== UEFA Intertoto Cup ===
Season	Club	Round	Opponent	Home	Away	Aggregate
1995	Etar Veliko Tarnovo	Group 9	(Romania) Ceahlăul Piatra Neamț	—N/a	0–2	5th
1995	Etar Veliko Tarnovo	Group 9	(Czech Republic) Boby Brno	3–1	—N/a	5th
1995	Etar Veliko Tarnovo	Group 9	(Netherlands) Groningen	—N/a	0–3	5th
1995	Etar Veliko Tarnovo	Group 9	(Belgium) Beveren	1–2	—N/a	5th
1996	CSKA Sofia	Group 11	(Turkey) Kocaelispor	—N/a	3–1	2nd
1996	CSKA Sofia	Group 11	(Malta) Hibernians	4–1	—N/a	2nd
1996	CSKA Sofia	Group 11	(Russia) Uralmash	—N/a	1–2	2nd
1996	CSKA Sofia	Group 11	(France) Strasbourg	0–0	—N/a	2nd
1996	Spartak Varna	Group 8	(Germany) 1860 München	2–1	—N/a	4th
1996	Spartak Varna	Group 8	(Poland) ŁKS Łódź	—N/a	1–1	4th
1996	Spartak Varna	Group 8	(Czech Republic) Kaučuk Opava	0–1	—N/a	4th
1996	Spartak Varna	Group 8	(Russia) KAMAZ Naberezhnye Chelny	—N/a	2–2	4th
1997	Spartak Varna	Group 10	(Netherlands) Groningen	0–2	—N/a	5th
1997	Spartak Varna	Group 10	(Romania) Gloria Bistrita	—N/a	1–2	5th
1997	Spartak Varna	Group 10	(France) Montpellier	1–1	—N/a	5th
1997	Spartak Varna	Group 10	(Federal Republic of Yugoslavia) Čukarički	—N/a	0–3	5th
1998	Spartak Varna	1R	(Russia) Baltika Kaliningrad	1–1	0–4	1–5
1999	Spartak Varna	1R	(Belgium) Sint-Truidense	1–2	0–6	1–8
2000	Velbazhd Kyustendil	1R	(Republic of Ireland) UCD	0–0	3–3	3–3 (a)
2000	Velbazhd Kyustendil	2R	(Czech Republic) Sigma Olomouc	2–0	0–8	2–8
2001	Spartak Varna	1R	(Poland) Dyskobolia Grodzisk	4–0	0–1	4–1
2001	Spartak Varna	2R	(Ukraine) Tavriya Simferopol	0–3	2–2	2–5
2002	Marek Dupnitsa	1R	(Wales) Caersws	2–0	1–1	3–1
2002	Marek Dupnitsa	2R	(Israel) Ashdod	1–0	1–1	2–1
2002	Marek Dupnitsa	3R	(Croatia) Slaven Belupo	0–3	1–3	1–6
2003	Marek Dupnitsa	1R	(Hungary) Videoton	1–1	2–2	3–3 (a)
2003	Marek Dupnitsa	2R	(Germany) Wolfsburg	1–1	0–2	1–3
2004	Marek Dupnitsa	1R	(Georgia (country)) Dila Gori	0–0	2–0	2–0
2004	Marek Dupnitsa	2R	(Belgium) Genk	0–0	1–2	1–2
2005	Did not participated^{1}					
2006	Lokomotiv Plovdiv	2R	(Romania) Farul Constanța	1−1	1−2	2−3
2007	Cherno More Varna	2R	(North Macedonia) Makedonija GP	4−0	3−0	7−0
2007	Cherno More Varna	3R	(Italy) Sampdoria	0−1	0−1	0−2
2008	PSFC Chernomorets	2R	(Slovenia) Gorica	1–1	2–0	3–1
2008	PSFC Chernomorets	3R	(Switzerland) Grasshopper	0–1	0–3	0–4

Notes

- Note 1: No club was elected by Bulgarian Football Union for the participation in the tournament in that season.
