= Wolfgang Rosenfeldt =

German footballer (1935–2016)

Personal information
- Date of birth: 12 October 1935
- Date of death: 11 February 2016 (aged 80)
- Position: Forward

Senior career*
Years	Team	Apps	(Gls)
1954–1960	Wacker 04 Berlin		
1960–1966	Tasmania Berlin		
1966–1968	Wacker 04 Berlin		
- * Club domestic league appearances and goals

Wolfgang Rosenfeldt (12 October 1935 – 11 February 2016) was a West German football striker.

His 20 Bundesliga appearances and 2 goals came in the 1965–66 SC Tasmania 1900 Berlin season, known as the worst season of any team in the Bundesliga.
