= 1965–66 SC Tasmania 1900 Berlin season =

SC Tasmania 1900 Berlin
1965–66 season
- Manager: Franz Linken (until November 1965); Heinz-Ludwig Schmidt (from November 1965)
- Stadium: Olympiastadion
- Bundesliga: 18th (relegated)
- DFB-Pokal: First round
- Highest home attendance: 81,524 vs Karlsruher SC, 14 August 1965
- Lowest home attendance: 827 vs Borussia Mönchengladbach, 15 January 1966

The 1965–66 season was SC Tasmania 1900 Berlin's first and only season in the Bundesliga, the top tier of German football. They finished 18th in the Bundesliga and were relegated to the Regionalliga Berlin, having set multiple Bundesliga records such as least points, fewest goals, most goals conceded and fewest wins. They were eliminated from the DFB-Pokal in the first round by 1. FC Köln.

== Season summary ==
Tasmania Berlin were added to the league just two weeks before the start of the season after city rivals Hertha BSC had been thrown out on financial irregularities. They were not even first choice for a replacement as the Berlin representative, as they had only finished in third place in Regionalliga Berlin. But when champions Tennis Borussia were considered too weak after failing in the promotion play-off rounds and therefore were not asked, and runners-up Spandauer SV declined their interest in a Bundesliga spot as well, Tasmania gladly accepted the invitation by the German FA.

The decision turned out to be a fatal one for the club. Tasmania's team was never capable of competing in the Bundesliga. They set up a various number of records, including, among others, lowest point total (8), fewest wins (2), most losses (28), fewest goals scored (15), most goals against (108) and lowest match attendance for a Bundesliga game (827 against Borussia Mönchengladbach on 15 January 1966). Most of the records are still intact.

== Competitions ==
=== Bundesliga ===
==== League table ====
Pos	Team	Pld	W	D	L	GF	GA	GR	Pts	Qualification or relegation
14	Schalke 04	34	10	7	17	33	55	0.600	27	
15	1. FC Kaiserslautern	34	8	10	16	42	65	0.646	26	
16	Karlsruher SC	34	9	6	19	35	71	0.493	24	
17	Borussia Neunkirchen (R)	34	9	4	21	32	82	0.390	22	Relegation to Regionalliga
18	Tasmania Berlin (R)	34	2	4	28	15	108	0.139	8	Relegation to Regionalliga

Rules for classification: 1) points; 2) goal ratio.
(R) Relegated

==== Matches ====
Win	Draw	Loss

Match	Date	Opponent	Venue	Result (Note: Tasmania Berlin's score written first)	Scorers	Attendance	Ref.
1	14 August 1965 – 16:00	Karlsruher SC	Home	2–0	Usbeck 65', 77'	81,524	
2	21 August 1965 – 16:00	Borussia Mönchengladbach	Away	0–5	—	33,000	
3	28 August 1965 – 16:00	Borussia Dortmund	Home	0–2	—	70,000	
4	4 September 1965 – 16:00	Hamburger SV	Away	1–5	Engler 65'	25,000	
5	11 September 1965 – 16:00	Bayern Munich	Home	0–2	—	40,000	
6	18 September 1965 – 16:00	1. FC Nürnberg	Away	2–7	Neumann 27', Usbeck 43'	14,000	
7	2 October 1965 – 15:00	Hannover 96	Home	1–5	Zeh 7'	25,000	
8	16 October 1965 – 16:00	1. FC Kaiserslautern	Away	0–0	—	16,000	
9	20 October 1965 – 15:45	VfB Stuttgart	Home	0–2	—	15,000	
10	23 October 1965 – 16:00	Meidericher SV	Away	0–3	—	13,000	
11	30 October 1965 – 15:00	1. FC Köln	Home	0–6	—	20,000	
12	6 November 1965 – 15:00	Werder Bremen	Away	0–5	—	15,000	
13	20 November 1965 – 14:30	TSV 1860 Munich	Home	0–5	—	10,000	
14	27 November 1965 – 15:00	Eintracht Frankfurt	Away	0–4	—	8,000	
16	11 December 1965 – 14:00	Borussia Neunkirchen	Away	1–3	Zeh 28'	13,000	
17	18 December 1965 – 14:00	Schalke 04	Home	1–2	Szymaniak 82'	4,000	
15	31 December 1965 – 14:00	Eintracht Braunschweig	Home	0–2	—	3,000	
18	8 January 1966 – 15:00	Karlsruher SC	Away	0–3	—	25,000	
19	15 January 1966 – 14:15	Borussia Mönchengladbach	Home	0–0	—	827	
20	29 January 1966 – 15:00	Borussia Dortmund	Away	1–3	Rosenfeldt 38'	15,000	
21	5 February 1966 – 14:30	Hamburger SV	Home	0–4	—	7,000	
22	12 February 1966 – 15:00	Bayern Munich	Away	1–2	Rosenfeldt 60'	18,000	
23	26 February 1966 – 15:00	1. FC Nürnberg	Home	0–1	—	4,000	
24	5 March 1966 – 16:00	Hannover 96	Away	0–5	—	12,000	
25	12 March 1966 – 16:00	1. FC Kaiserslautern	Home	1–1	Usbeck 62'	3,000	
26	19 March 1966 – 16:00	VfB Stuttgart	Away	0–2	—	10,000	
27	26 March 1966 – 16:00	Meidericher SV	Home	0–9	—	1,500	
28	2 April 1966 – 16:00	1. FC Köln	Away	0–4	—	8,036	
29	16 April 1966 – 16:00	Werder Bremen	Home	1–1	Engler 31'	1,200	
30	23 April 1966 – 16:00	TSV 1860 Munich	Away	0–4	—	23,000	
31	30 April 1966 – 16:00	Eintracht Frankfurt	Home	0–3	—	4,000	
32	14 May 1966 – 16:00	Eintracht Braunschweig	Away	1–3	Konieczka 55'	6,000	
33	21 May 1966 – 16:00	Borussia Neunkirchen	Home	2–1	Zeh 22', Neumann 83'	2,000	
34	28 May 1966 – 16:00	Schalke 04	Away	0–4	—	8,000	

=== DFB-Pokal ===
Win	Draw	Loss

Round	Date	Opponent	Venue	Result	Attendance	Ref.
First round	22 January 1966 – 15:00	1. FC Köln	Away	1–1 (a.e.t.)	4,756	
First round replay	19 February 1966 – 16:00	1. FC Köln	Home	0–2	3,000	
