= 1961–62 Austrian Cup =

Tournament details
- Country: Austria

Final positions
- Champions: Austria Wien
- Runners-up: Grazer AK

The 1961–62 Austrian Cup (German: ÖFB-Cup) was the 28th season of Austria's nationwide football cup competition. The final was held at the Praterstadion, Vienna on 30 May 1962.

The competition was won by Austria Wien after beating Grazer AK 4–1.

== First round ==
Team 1	Score	Team 2
9 September 1961
SK Bischofshofen	1–2	FC Lustenau
SV Austria Salzburg	4–3	FC Wacker Innsbruck
SV Wattens	7–0	FC Dornbirn
Voith St. Pölten	4–2	ASV Neufeld
ASV Siegendorf	2–0 (a.e.t.)	FS Elektra Wien
SC Ortmann	1–0	Wacker Wien
ASV Hohenau	1–2 (a.e.t.)	SV Wienerberg
FC ÖMV Stadlau	1–0	Slovan-Olympia Wien
SK Sturm Graz	6–1	SK Vorwärts Steyr
WSV ATSV Ranshofen	1–2	SK Austria Klagenfurt
WSG Ferndorf	1–2	Welser SC
10 September 1961
Grazer SC	1–2	SK VÖEST Linz
10 October 1961
WSV Donawitz	0–3	ESV Austria Graz

== Second round ==
Team 1	Score	Team 2
7 October 1961
FC ÖMV Stadlau	0–2	SC Schwaz
1 November 1961
Badener AC	1–3	Voith St. Pölten
SC Kufstein	2–2 (a.e.t.)	Landstraßer AC
SK Austria Klagenfurt	0–1	Rot-Weiß Rankweil
WSV Eisenerz	2–1	Kremser SC
Amateure Steyr	1–2	WSG Radenthein
SC Pinkafeld	4–2	Klagenfurter AC
SV Mattersburg	2–3	Post-Admira Linz
19 November 1961
SK VÖEST Linz	4–3	WSV Fohnsdorf
SC Ortmann	1–0	SV Wienerberg
Nussdorfer AC	1–1 (a.e.t.)	ASK Gloggnitz
8 December 1961
SK Sturm Graz	4–0	Innsbrucker AC
ESV Austria Graz	0–3	SK Bürmoos
SV Wattens	5–0	Blau-Weiß Feldkirch
ASK Köflach	1–0	ASV Siegendorf
10 December 1961
FC Lustenau	5–1	SC Hallein
21 January 1962
SV Austria Salzburg	1–0	Schwarz-Weiß Bregenz
4 February 1962
Welser SC	2–1 (a.e.t.)	SC Austria Lustenau
Replay: 8 December 1961
Landstraßer AC	1–0	SC Kufstein
Replay: 14 January 1962
ASK Gloggnitz	1–2	Nussdorfer AC

== Round of 32 ==
Team 1	Score	Team 2
16 December 1961
Post-Admira Linz	1–2	1. Wiener Neustädter SC
17 December 1961
SK Sturm Graz	4–3	First Vienna FC
Wiener AC	5–1	WSV Eisenerz
Wiener Sport-Club	7–1	ASK Köflach
SC Schwaz	1–2	FC Lustenau
SK Bürmoos	1–5	Grazer AK
23 December 1961
Kapfenberger SV	5–1	SC Pinkafeld
26 December 1961
SVS Linz	4–5	SK Rapid Wien
Admira-Energie Wien	7–0	SK VÖEST Linz
6 January 1962
Salzburger AK 1914	3–3 (a.e.t.)	Rot-Weiß Rankweil
21 January 1962
WSG Radenthein	1–0 (a.e.t.)	SC Ortmann
27 January 1962
FK Austria Wien	6–0	SV Wattens
28 January 1962
1. Schwechater SC	7–1	Landstraßer AC
Nussdorfer AC	0–1	1. Simmeringer SC
4 February 1962
Linzer ASK	2–0	SV Austria Salzburg
18 February 1962
Voith St. Pölten	1–0	Welser SC
Replay: 28 January 1962
Rot-Weiß Rankweil	3–4	Salzburger AK 1914

== Round of 16 ==
Team 1	Score	Team 2
24 February 1962
Admira-Energie Wien	0–1	FK Austria Wien
25 February 1962
1. Wiener Neustädter SC	2–4	1. Schwechater SC
Salzburger AK 1914	1–0	Wiener AC
Grazer AK	2–0	Wiener Sport-Club
Voith St. Pölten	3–6	Linzer ASK
FC Lustenau	7–6 (a.e.t.)	Kapfenberger SV
WSG Radenthein	1–3	SC Simmering
11 April 1962
SK Rapid Wien	2–1	SK Sturm Graz

== Quarter-finals ==
Team 1	Score	Team 2
22 April 1962
FC Lustenau	0–8	1. Schwechater SC
25 April 1962
Grazer AK	3–1	SK Rapid Wien
Salzburger AK 1914	1–3	Linzer ASK
FK Austria Wien	4–1	1. Simmeringer SC

== Semi-finals ==
Team 1	Score	Team 2
15 May 1962
Linzer ASK	1–2	Grazer AK
FK Austria Wien	5–1	1. Schwechater SC

== Final ==
30 May 1962
19:30

FK Austria Wien	4–1	Grazer AK
Nemec 25', 72'; Ocwirk 68'; Vargo 83'	Report	Schursch 66'

Praterstadion, Vienna
Attendance: 8,600
Referee: Friedrich Mayer
