= Klaus Konieczka =

German footballer

Personal information
- Date of birth: 9 February 1944 (age 82)
- Position: Midfielder

Senior career*
Years	Team	Apps	(Gls)
1962–1966	Tasmania Berlin		
1966–1968	Eintracht Trier		
1968–1971	TeBe Berlin		
1971–1973	1. FC Neukölln		
- * Club domestic league appearances and goals

Klaus Konieczka (born 9 February 1944) is a retired West German football midfielder.

His 30 Bundesliga appearances and 1 goal came in the 1965–66 SC Tasmania 1900 Berlin season, known as the worst season of any team in the Bundesliga.
