= Peter Engler =

German footballer

Personal information
- Date of birth: 3 September 1936 (age 90)
- Position: Midfielder

Senior career*
Years	Team	Apps	(Gls)
1955–1957	VfB Hermsdorf		
1957–1959	SC Tasmania 1900 Berlin		
1959–1961	Hertha BSC		
1961–1962	SC Tasmania 1900 Berlin		
1962–1963	1. FC Nürnberg		
1963–1964	Lausanne-Sport		
1964–1967	SC Tasmania 1900 Berlin		
1967–1969	1. FC Neukölln		

Managerial career
- 1969–1970: BFC Viktoria 1889
- 1975–1976: BFC Viktoria 1889
- * Club domestic league appearances and goals

Peter Engler (born 3 September 1936) is a German former football player and manager who played as a midfielder. His 26 Bundesliga appearances and two goals came in the 1965–66 SC Tasmania 1900 Berlin season, known as the worst season of any team in the Bundesliga.
