= Peter Vargo =

Austrian footballer (1941–2017)

Personal information
- Date of birth: 1 October 1941
- Date of death: 14 March 2017 (aged 75)
- Position: Defender

Senior career*
Years	Team	Apps	(Gls)
1959–1965	Austria Wien		
1966–1967	Sportclub Wacker Vienna		

International career
1963	Austria	2	(0)
- * Club domestic league appearances and goals

Peter Vargo (1 October 1941 – 14 March 2017) was an Austrian footballer who played as a defender for Austria Wien and Wacker Wien. He made two appearances for the Austria national team in 1963.
