= 1961–62 Irish Cup =

Tournament details
- Country: Northern Ireland
- Teams: 16

Final positions
- Champions: Linfield (28th win)
- Runners-up: Portadown

Tournament statistics
- Matches played: 17
- Goals scored: 63 (3.71 per match)

The 1961–62 Irish Cup was the 82nd edition of the Irish Cup, the premier knock-out cup competition in Northern Irish football.

Linfield won the cup for the 28th time, defeating Portadown 4–0 in the final at The Oval.

The holders Glenavon were defeated by Portadown in the semi-finals.

== Results ==
=== First round ===
Team 1	Score	Team 2
Ards	1–2	Coleraine
Ballymena United	2–3	Crusaders
Banbridge Town	2–1	Bangor
Cliftonville	2–1	Glentoran II
Derry City	2–2	Glenavon
Distillery	2–4	Glentoran
Linfield	3–0	Ballyclare Comrades
Portadown	3–0	Dundela

==== Replay ====
Team 1	Score	Team 2
Glenavon	2–1	Derry City

=== Quarter-finals ===
Team 1	Score	Team 2
Bangor	1–0	Glentoran
Cliftonville	2–4	Linfield
Crusaders	3–3	Portadown
Glenavon	2–1	Coleraine

==== Replay ====
Team 1	Score	Team 2
Portadown	2–0	Crusaders

=== Semi-finals ===
Team 1	Score	Team 2
Linfield	3–1	Bangor
Portadown	3–1	Glenavon

=== Final ===
14 April 1962

Linfield	4–0	Portadown
Barr 22'; Braithwaite 38'; Dickson 39', 68'	Report

The Oval, Belfast
Attendance: 23,000
