= Spasoje Samardžić =

Serbian retired soccer player and manager (born 1942)

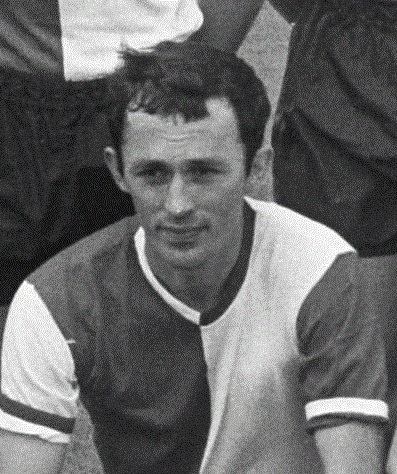
- Samardžić with Feyenoord in August 1967

Personal information
- Full name: Spasoje Samardžić
- Date of birth: 20 May 1942 (age 84)
- Place of birth: Kraljica, Kingdom of Albania
- Height: 1.72 m (5 ft 8 in)
- Position: Winger

Youth career
- 1957–1958: Novi Beograd
- 1958–1960: OFK Beograd

Senior career*
Years	Team	Apps	(Gls)
1960–1966	OFK Beograd	143	(51)
1966–1967	Twente	17	(7)
1967–1969	Feijenoord	39	(12)
1969–1971	Saint-Étienne	33	(6)
Total		232	(76)

International career
1959	Yugoslavia U20	3	(0)
1963	Yugoslavia U21	1	(0)
1962–1966	Yugoslavia	26	(3)

Managerial career
- Srem Jakovo
- Beograd
- * Club domestic league appearances and goals

Spasoje "Paja" Samardžić (Serbian Cyrillic: Спасоје Паја Самарџић; born 20 May 1942) is a Serbian retired football winger and manager.

== Playing career ==
=== Club ===
Paja Samardžić joined Dutch club Twente from OFK Beograd in 1966 and later controversially moved to fellow Eredivisie side Feijenoord. He finished his career at French top-tier outfit Saint-Étienne.

=== International ===
With two games for the young team (1959) and one for the Under-21 team (1963), he capped 26 games for the best selection of Yugoslavia, scoring three goals. He debuted against East Germany (1–2) in Leipzig on 16 September 1962, then he played in the Olympic tournament in Japan. He played his last national team game on 19 October 1966 against Czechoslovakia (0–3) in Belgrade.

== Coaching career ==
Following his playing career, Samardžić worked as a coach for Srem Jakovo and FK Beograd. He also served as director of OFK Beograd.

== Honours ==
OFK Beograd

- Yugoslav First League: Runner-up 1963–64
- Yugoslav Cup: 1961–62, 1965–66

Feyenoord

- Eredivisie: 1968–69
- KNVB Cup: 1968–69
- UEFA Intertoto Cup: 1967, 1968

Saint-Étienne

- Ligue 1: 1969–70
- Coupe de France: 1969–70
