= Chuzo (footballer) =

Spanish footballer (1940–2025)

Personal information
- Full name: Antonio González Álvarez
- Date of birth: 28 January 1940
- Place of birth: Antequera, Spain
- Date of death: 11 December 2025 (aged 85)
- Height: 1.74 m (5 ft 9 in)
- Position: Defender

Youth career
- Antequerano
- Atlético Madrid

Senior career*
Years	Team	Apps	(Gls)
1957–1963	Atlético Madrid	103	(13)
1963–1971	Málaga	128	(18)
Total		231	(31)

International career
1957–1958	Spain U18	9	(13)
1960	Spain B	1	(0)
1960	Spain	1	(0)
- * Club domestic league appearances and goals

Antonio González Álvarez (28 January 1940 – 11 December 2025), commonly known as Chuzo, was a Spanish footballer who played as a defender.

== Club career ==
Born in Antequera, Málaga, Chuzo made his professional debut with Atlético Madrid, first appearing in La Liga at the age of just 17. Even though he never played one full schedule during his six-year spell with the capital club, he started in all but one of the games he appeared in.

In the 1962–63 season, after having helped the Colchoneros to back-to-back Copa del Rey trophies and the 1962 UEFA Cup Winners' Cup (he played in the first match of the final against ACF Fiorentina, in Glasgow) Chuzo scored an astonishing nine goals in only 14 matches, with Atlético finishing in second position in the league behind neighbouring Real Madrid.

After winning the European accolade, Chuzo signed for local CD Málaga, playing with the Andalusians during eight years, suffering top flight relegation twice and appearing rarely in his final years. Over the course of ten professional seasons he appeared in 146 games, netting 14 goals.

== International career ==
On 30 October 1960, Chuzo played his first and only game for the Spain national team, appearing in a 3–0 friendly loss to Austria in Vienna.

== Personal life and death ==
Chuzo's hometown of Antequera has named a street after him.

His granddaughter is the professional padel player Beatriz González Fernández.

He died on 11 December 2025, at the age of 85.

== Honours ==
Atlético Madrid

- UEFA Cup Winners' Cup: 1961–62
- Copa del Generalísimo: 1959–60, 1960–61

Spain U18

- UEFA European Under-18 Championship runner-up: 1957
