= Johannes Jank =

Austrian footballer

Personal information
- Date of birth: 21 July 1936 (age 90)

International career
Years	Team	Apps	(Gls)
1963	Austria	1	(0)

Johannes Jank (born 21 July 1936) is an Austrian footballer. He played in one match for the Austria national football team in 1963.
