= Jules Zambon =

Luxembourgish footballer

Personal information
- Date of birth: 3 August 1938 (age 88)

International career
Years	Team	Apps	(Gls)
1961–1965	Luxembourg	13	(0)

Jules Zambon (born 3 August 1938) is a Luxembourgish footballer. He played in 13 matches for the Luxembourg national football team from 1961 to 1965.
