= 1932–33 Mansfield Town F.C. season =

Mansfield Town
1932–33 season
- Manager: Jack Hickling, Henry Martin
- Stadium: Field Mill
- Third Division North: 16th
- FA Cup: Third Round
Home colours

The 1932–33 season was Mansfield Town's second season in the Football League and first in the Third Division North after being transferred from the Third Division South. The Stags finished the campaign in 16th position with 35 points. During the season Mansfield recorded their record victory, a 9–2 win against Rotherham United on 27 December 1932 and their record defeat, an 8–1 loss to Walsall.

== Final league table ==
Pos	Team	Pld	W	D	L	GF	GA	GAv	Pts
14	Hartlepools United	42	16	7	19	87	116	0.750	39
15	Halifax Town	42	15	8	19	71	90	0.789	38
16	Mansfield Town	42	14	7	21	84	100	0.840	35
17	Rotherham United	42	14	6	22	60	84	0.714	34
18	Rochdale	42	13	7	22	58	80	0.725	33

Source: rsssf.com

== Results ==
=== Football League Third Division North ===
Match	Date	Opponent	Venue	Result	Attendance	Scorers
1	27 August 1932	Chester	H	1–0	8,009	Hoyland
2	31 August 1932	New Brighton	A	0–1	3,331	
3	3 September 1932	Barrow	A	0–1	4,657	
4	5 September 1932	New Brighton	H	5–0	4,636	Hoyland, Johnson (4)
5	10 September 1932	Carlisle United	H	3–1	7,573	Johnson (2), Bowater
6	17 September 1932	York City	A	3–4	4,313	Johnson, Bowater, Raynor
7	24 September 1932	Crewe Alexandra	H	4–0	7,856	Johnson (2), Hoyland, Robinson
8	1 October 1932	Rochdale	A	1–2	5,945	Johnson
9	8 October 1932	Stockport County	H	4–0	5,827	Bowater (2), Hoyland, Johnson
10	15 October 1932	Barnsley	A	2–6	5,145	Johnson (2)
11	22 October 1932	Hull City	H	2–1	8,436	Johnson, Fisher
12	29 October 1932	Doncaster Rovers	A	2–2	5,767	Johnson, Anthoney
13	5 November 1932	Darlington	H	3–3	7,346	Johnson (3)
14	12 November 1932	Stockport County	A	2–2	5,498	Bowater (2)
15	19 November 1932	Gateshead	H	1–2	6,823	Cropper
16	3 December 1932	Wrexham	H	0–0	5,557	
17	10 December 1932	Rochdale	H	4–1	4,441	Bowater, Readman, Prior
18	17 December 1932	Halifax Town	H	2–2	4,688	Johnson, Broome
19	24 December 1932	Hartlepools United	A	3–6	3,872	Johnson, Prior, Bowater
20	26 December 1932	Rotherham United	A	0–3	5,580	
21	27 December 1932	Rotherham United	H	9–2	7,192	Readman (3), Hoyland (3), Bowater (3)
22	31 December 1932	Chester	A	2–5	6,618	Hoyland, Anthoney
23	2 January 1933	Accrington Stanley	A	0–6	2,47	
24	7 January 1933	Barrow	H	2–1	4,633	Readman, Bowater
25	19 January 1933	Walsall	A	1–8	3,068	Bowater
26	21 January 1933	Carlisle United	A	1–3	4,328	Johnson
27	28 January 1933	York City	H	2–0	4,127	Johnson, Hoyland
28	4 February 1933	Crewe Alexandra	A	0–7	3,771	
29	18 February 1933	Southport	A	2–5	2,307	Johnson (2)
30	4 March 1933	Hull City	A	1–4	8,630	Prior
31	11 March 1933	Doncaster Rovers	H	2–2	4,651	Readman, Bowater
32	18 March 1933	Darlington	A	3–1	2,678	Johnson (2), Prior
33	25 March 1933	Stockport County	H	1–2	5,070	Prior
34	1 April 1933	Gateshead	A	2–3	2,413	Johnson, Bowater
35	8 April 1933	Walsall	H	2–0	4,023	Bowater, Fisher
36	10 April 1933	Tranmere Rovers	A	0–3	1,737	
37	14 April 1933	Barnsley	H	0–1	5,994	
38	15 April 1933	Wrexham	A	1–1	7,775	Readman
39	17 April 1933	Accrington Stanley	H	1–3	3,869	Prior
40	22 April 1933	Tranmere Rovers	H	2–0	2,859	Fisher (2)
41	29 April 1933	Halifax Town	A	1–5	2,305	Johnson
42	6 May 1933	Hartlepools United	H	7–1	2,381	Johnson (2), Bowater (2), Fisher, Wonnacott (2)

=== FA Cup ===
Round	Date	Opponent	Venue	Result	Attendance	Scorers
R1	26 November 1932	Walsall	A	1–4	9,838	Johnson

== Squad statistics ==
- Squad list sourced from 1932–33 Mansfield Town F.C. season at the English National Football Archive (subscription required)

Pos.	Name	League		FA Cup		Total	
Pos.	Name	Apps	Goals	Apps	Goals	Apps	Goals
GK	(England) Jack Clough	30	0	0	0	30	0
GK	(England) Jimmy Wilson	12	0	1	0	13	0
DF	(England) Charles Anthoney	39	2	1	0	40	2
DF	(England) Leslie Butler	14	0	0	0	14	0
DF	(England) Bernard Chambers	1	0	0	0	1	0
DF	Ernie England	29	0	1	0	30	0
DF	(England) Charlie Lloyd	4	0	0	0	4	0
DF	(England) Albert Robinson	11	0	0	0	11	0
DF	(England) Sam Robinson	33	1	1	0	34	1
MF	(England) Reg Davies	18	0	0	0	18	0
MF	(England) Clifford Herring	2	0	0	0	2	0
MF	(England) Eli Sivister	1	0	0	0	1	0
MF	(England) Bill Slack	25	0	0	0	25	0
MF	(England) Arthur Weightman	17	0	1	0	18	0
FW	(England) George Bowater	38	18	1	0	39	18
FW	(England) Harry Broome	14	1	0	0	14	1
FW	(England) Reg Cropper	6	1	1	0	7	1
FW	(England) Billy Cupit	2	0	0	0	2	0
FW	(England) Fred Fisher	9	5	0	0	9	5
FW	(England) William Foster	2	0	0	0	2	0
FW	(England) Walter Hoyland	25	9	1	0	26	9
FW	(England) Harry Johnson	38	30	1	1	39	31
FW	(England) Jacob Parsons	2	0	0	0	2	0
FW	(England) Jack Prior	32	7	0	0	32	7
FW	(England) George Raynor	9	1	1	0	10	1
FW	(England) Joe Readman	34	7	1	0	35	7
FW	(England) Ben Wonnacott	15	2	0	0	15	2
