= 1931–32 Mansfield Town F.C. season =

Mansfield Town
1931–32 season
- Manager: Jack Hickling
- Stadium: Field Mill
- Football League Third Division South: 20th
- FA Cup: Third Round
Home colours

The 1931–32 season was Mansfield Town's first season in the Football League where they competed in the Football League Third Division South. They finished their maiden season in 20th position with 32 points.

== Final league table ==
Pos	Team	Pld	W	D	L	GF	GA	GAv	Pts	Promotion or relegation
18	Bristol Rovers	42	13	8	21	65	92	0.707	34	
19	Torquay United	42	12	9	21	72	106	0.679	33	
20	Mansfield Town	42	11	10	21	75	108	0.694	32	Transferred to the Third Division North
21	Gillingham	42	10	8	24	40	82	0.488	28	Re-elected
22	Thames	42	7	9	26	53	109	0.486	23	Resigned from the league and folded (Note: Thames decided not to seek re-election and subsequently folded.)

== Results ==
=== Football League Third Division South ===
Match	Date	Opponent	Venue	Result	Attendance	Scorers
1	29 August 1931	Swindon Town	H	3–2	12,232	Broome (2), Readman
2	31 August 1931	Norwich City	A	1–1	13,913	Davis
3	5 September 1931	Leyton Orient	A	0–4	8,138	
4	7 September 1931	Watford	H	3–2	8,662	Broome, Readman, Gilhespy
5	12 September 1931	Torquay United	H	2–4	8,499	Johnson (2)
6	16 September 1931	Watford	A	1–4	7,309	Johnson
7	19 September 1931	Bristol Rovers	A	1–1	10,770	England
8	26 September 1931	Queens Park Rangers	H	2–2	8,461	Johnson (2)
9	3 October 1931	Bournemouth & Boscombe Athletic	A	2–3	7,674	Baxter, Johnson
10	10 October 1931	Crystal Palace	H	1–1	10,849	Gilhespy
11	17 October 1931	Cardiff City	A	0–2	7,688	
12	24 October 1931	Northampton Town	H	2–0	7,015	Johnson (2)
13	31 October 1931	Reading	A	1–4	8,083	Gilhespy
14	7 November 1931	Southend United	H	4–4	8,833	Broome, Johnson (2), Readman
15	14 November 1931	Fulham	A	1–2	16,977	Johnson
16	21 November 1931	Thames	H	4–0	7,644	Johnson, Staniforth, England, Death
17	5 December 1931	Exeter City	H	3–1	6,602	Johnson (2), Featherby
18	12 December 1931	Coventry City	A	1–5	11,046	Readman
19	19 December 1931	Gillingham	H	3–1	5,400	Johnson, Bowater (2)
20	25 December 1931	Brighton & Hove Albion	H	3–3	10,848	Featherby, Readman (2)
21	26 December 1931	Brighton & Hove Albion	A	0–4	16,516	
22	2 January 1932	Swindon Town	A	2–5	4,481	Johnson (2)
23	9 January 1932	Crystal Palace	A	1–2	10,817	Featherby
24	13 January 1932	Brentford	A	1–1	4,902	Johnson
25	16 January 1932	Clapton Orient	H	4–3	6,719	Bowater, Johnson (2), Weightman
26	23 January 1932	Torquay United	A	2–2	3,370	Broome, Death
27	30 January 1932	Bristol Rovers	H	0–3	7,118	
28	6 February 1932	Queens Park Rangers	A	1–1	12,079	Bowater
29	13 February 1932	Bournemouth & Boscombe Athletic	H	2–1	5,476	Broome, Bowater
30	27 February 1932	Cardiff City	H	1–2	8,316	Johnson
31	5 March 1932	Northampton Town	A	0–3	5,777	
32	12 March 1932	Reading	H	1–7	6,228	Johnson
33	19 March 1932	Southend United	A	2–5	6,710	Johnson, Fisher
34	25 March 1932	Luton Town	A	1–3	7,621	Johnson
35	26 March 1932	Fulham	H	1–2	5,910	Storer
36	28 March 1932	Luton Town	H	5–2	5,588	Bowater (2), Johnson (3)
37	2 April 1932	Thames	A	3–6	1,070	Johnson, Featherby
38	9 April 1932	Brentford	H	2–0	4,932	Broome (2)
39	16 April 1932	Exeter City	A	0–3	5,478	
40	23 April 1932	Coventry City	H	3–3	4,492	Johnson (2), Staniforth
41	30 April 1932	Gillingham	A	0–2	2,936	
42	7 May 1932	Norwich City	H	5–2	4,107	Bowater (2), Johnson (2), Gilhespy

=== FA Cup ===
Round	Date	Opponent	Venue	Result	Attendance	Scorers
R1	28 November 1931	Hull City	A	1–4	10,000	Death

== Squad statistics ==
Pos.	Name	League		FA Cup		Total	
Pos.	Name	Apps	Goals	Apps	Goals	Apps	Goals
GK	(England) Arthur Staples	13	0	0	0	13	0
GK	(England) Jimmy Wilson	29	0	1	0	30	0
DF	(England) Bernard Chambers	9	0	0	0	9	0
DF	(England) George Clifford	39	0	1	0	40	0
DF	(England) Charlie Davis	5	1	0	0	5	1
DF	Ernie England	42	2	1	0	43	2
DF	(England) Charlie Lloyd	1	0	0	0	1	0
DF	(England) Albert Robinson	1	0	0	0	1	0
DF	(England) Sam Robinson	28	0	1	0	29	0
DF	(England) Claude White	1	0	0	0	1	0
MF	(England) George Blackburn	14	0	0	0	14	0
MF	(England) Horace Burrows	0	0	0	0	0	0
MF	(England) Arthur Phoenix	3	0	0	0	3	0
MF	(England) Harry Wake	20	0	1	0	21	0
MF	(England) Arthur Weightman	28	1	1	0	29	1
FW	(England) Thomas Baxter	14	1	0	0	14	1
FW	(England) George Bowater	22	10	0	0	22	10
FW	(England) Harry Broome	34	8	1	0	35	8
FW	(England) Billy Death	14	2	1	1	15	3
FW	(England) Len Featherby	22	5	0	0	22	5
FW	(England) Fred Fisher	1	1	0	0	1	1
FW	(England) Cyril Gilhespy	19	4	1	0	20	4
FW	(England) Jimmy Jepson	1	0	0	0	1	0
FW	(England) Harry Johnson	40	32	1	0	41	32
FW	(England) Joe Readman	39	5	1	0	40	5
FW	(England) Thomas Small	2	0	0	0	2	0
FW	(England) Chris Staniforth	8	2	0	0	8	2
FW	(England) Jackie Storer	13	1	0	0	13	1
