= 1933–34 Mansfield Town F.C. season =

Mansfield Town
1933–34 season
- Manager: Henry Martin
- Stadium: Field Mill
- Third Division North: 17th
- FA Cup: Third Round
- Third Division North Cup: Semi-final
Home colours

The 1933–34 season was Mansfield Town's third season in the Football League and second in the Third Division North. The Stags finished the campaign in 17th position with 34 points.

== Final league table ==
Pos	Team	Pld	W	D	L	GF	GA	GAv	Pts
15	New Brighton	42	14	8	20	62	87	0.713	36
16	Darlington	42	13	9	20	70	101	0.693	35
17	Mansfield Town	42	11	12	19	81	88	0.920	34
18	Southport	42	8	17	17	63	90	0.700	33
19	Gateshead	42	12	9	21	76	110	0.691	33

Source: rsssf.com

== Results ==
=== Football League Third Division North ===
Match	Date	Opponent	Venue	Result	Attendance	Scorers
1	26 August 1933	Hartlepools United	H	1–1	7,101	Munnings
2	28 August 1933	Tranmere Rovers	H	0–0	5,121	
3	2 September 1933	Wrexham	A	0–5	6,320	
4	4 September 1933	Tranmere Rovers	A	2–3	6,877	Johnson, Rayner
5	9 September 1933	Southport	H	2–2	5,101	Butler (2)
6	16 September 1933	Darlington	A	4–1	4,158	Butler, Munnings (2), Johnson
7	23 September 1933	Gateshead	H	1–1	5,057	Rayner
8	30 September 1933	Accrington Stanley	A	1–1	4,271	Hill
9	7 October 1933	Chesterfield	H	0–3	14,148	
10	14 October 1933	Rochdale	A	2–2	5,334	Butler, Methven
11	21 October 1933	York City	A	0–1	5,261	
12	28 October 1933	Chester	H	2–1	4,007	Johnson (2)
13	4 November 1933	Doncaster Rovers	A	0–1	5,786	
14	11 November 1933	Barrow	H	0–5	4,824	
15	18 November 1933	Carlisle United	A	2–3	3,335	Foster, Batey (o.g.)
16	2 December 1933	Halifax Town	A	2–4	5,781	Johnson, Rayner
17	9 December 1933	Crewe Alexandra	H	4–1	2,465	Johnson, Butler, Foster, Rayner
18	16 December 1933	New Brighton	A	1–5	2,101	Munnings
19	23 December 1933	Rotherham United	H	3–0	3,818	Johnson, Kilcar
20	25 December 1933	Walsall	H	1–2	7,657	Prentice
21	26 December 1933	Walsall	A	0–0	10,251	
22	30 December 1933	Hartlepools United	A	1–3	2,759	Johnson
23	6 January 1934	Wrexham	H	1–1	3,523	Johnson
24	13 January 1934	Stockport County	H	1–1	5,191	Kilcar
25	20 January 1934	Southport	A	3–3	2,316	Kilcar, Johnson, Livingstone
26	27 January 1934	Darlington	H	4–0	4,439	Slack, Rayner, Bytheway, Kirk
27	3 February 1934	Gateshead	A	3–5	2,482	England, Rayner, Butler
28	10 February 1934	Accrington Stanley	H	5–0	4,441	Kilcar, Johnson (2), Bytheway, Munnings
29	17 February 1934	Chesterfield	A	2–3	12,298	Johnson, Clayton
30	24 February 1934	Rochdale	H	5–0	4,502	Johnson (2), Bytheway (2), Munnings
31	3 March 1934	York City	H	0–2	4,843	
32	10 March 1934	Chester	A	1–1	3,728	Johnson
33	17 March 1934	Doncaster Rovers	H	1–1	4,524	Bytheway
34	24 March 1934	Barrow	A	3–6	3,453	Johnson (2), Kilcar
35	30 March 1934	Barnsley	H	1–5	8,422	Methven
36	31 March 1934	Carlisle United	H	6–0	3,301	Methven (3), Hill, Kilcar, Munnings
37	2 April 1934	Barnsley	A	1–6	10,814	Methven
38	7 April 1934	Stockport County	A	1–3	8,879	Kilcar
39	14 April 1934	Halifax Town	H	6–1	3,286	Methven (2), Kilcar (2), Hill (2)
40	21 April 1934	Crewe Alexandra	A	1–2	2,467	Kilcar
41	28 April 1934	New Brighton	H	5–2	2,742	Rayner, Kilcar, Bytheway (2), Goodacre
42	5 May 1934	Rotherham United	A	2–1	1,324	Methven, Hill

=== FA Cup ===
Round	Date	Opponent	Venue	Result	Attendance	Scorers
R1	25 November 1933	New Brighton	A	0–0	4,289	
R1 Replay	29 November 1933	New Brighton	H	3–4	6,300	Johnson (2), Rayner

=== Football League Third Division North Cup ===
Round	Date	Opponent	Venue	Result	Attendance	Scorers
R2	29 January 1934	Walsall	A	2–1	1,500	Foster, Methven
R3	21 March 1934	Chesterfield	H	4–1	3,500	Johnson (2), Prentice, England
SF	16 April 1934	Stockport County	A	0–4	3,419	

== Squad statistics ==
- Squad list sourced from 1933–34 Mansfield Town F.C. season at the English National Football Archive (subscription required)

Pos.	Name	League		FA Cup		Third Division Cup		Total	
Pos.	Name	Apps	Goals	Apps	Goals	Apps	Goals	Apps	Goals
GK	(England) Joe Edwards	20	0	0	0	2	0	22	0
GK	(England) Charles Williams	22	0	2	0	2	0	26	0
DF	(England) Jack Ashley	30	0	2	0	3	0	35	0
DF	(England) Leslie Butler	32	5	0	0	1	0	33	5
DF	Ernie England	36	1	2	0	1	1	39	2
DF	(England) Reg Goodacre	18	1	0	0	1	0	19	1
DF	(England) Tom Maddison	0	0	1	0	1	0	2	0
DF	(England) Sam Robinson	0	0	1	0	0	0	1	0
MF	(England) John Clayton	15	1	2	0	2	0	19	1
MF	(England) Frank Rayner	17	8	2	1	1	0	20	9
MF	(England) Eli Sivister	1	0	0	0	0	0	1	0
MF	(England) Bill Slack	42	1	2	0	3	0	47	1
MF	(England) William Wood	5	0	0	0	1	0	6	0
FW	(England) George Bytheway	24	7	0	0	2	0	26	7
FW	(England) William Foster	8	2	2	0	1	1	11	3
FW	(England) Harold Hill	22	5	2	0	1	0	25	5
FW	(England) Harry Johnson	32	18	2	2	1	2	35	22
FW	(England) Harry Keeling	8	0	0	0	0	0	8	0
FW	(Scotland) Steve Kilcar	21	12	0	0	3	0	24	12
FW	(England) William Kirk	7	1	0	0	1	0	8	1
FW	(Scotland) Alan Livingstone	33	1	0	0	1	0	34	1
FW	(England) Georgie Mee	11	0	0	0	0	0	11	0
FW	(England) Harold Methven	10	9	0	0	2	0	12	9
FW	(England) Eddie Munnings	29	7	2	0	1	0	32	7
FW	(Scotland) David Prentice	19	1	0	0	2	2	21	3
–	Own goals	–	1	–	0	–	0	–	1
