= James Wilson =

James Wilson may refer to:

== Politicians and government officials ==
=== Canada ===
- James Wilson (Upper Canada politician) (1770–1847), English-born farmer and political figure in Upper Canada
- James Crocket Wilson (1841–1899), Canadian MP from Quebec
- James Robert Wilson (1866–1941), mayor of Saskatoon and member of the Parliament of Canada
- James Wilson (Ontario MPP) (1810–1891), Canadian politician
- James Frederick Wilson, Ontario MPP

=== Oceania ===
- James Wilson (New South Wales politician, born 1862) (1862–1925), English-born Australian politician
- James Wilson (New South Wales politician, born 1865) (1865–1927), New Zealand-born Australian politician
- Sir James Wilson (New Zealand politician, born 1849) (1849–1929), New Zealand politician and farmer
- James Wilson (New Zealand politician, born 1814) (1814–1898)
- Sir James Milne Wilson (1812–1880), Australian politician in Tasmania
- James Phillips Wilson (c. 1852–1925), South Australian Labor politician

=== United Kingdom ===
- James Wilson (MP for York) between 1826 and 1830
- James Wilson (Labour politician) (1879–1943), British MP for Dudley and Oldham
- James Harold Wilson (1916–1995), Prime Minister of the United Kingdom, 1964–1970 and 1974–1976
- James Wilson (businessman) (1805–1860), UK member of parliament and founder of The Economist magazine
- James Wilson (Orangeman) (fl. 1793–94), North Irish politician, founder of the Orange Institution

=== United States ===
- James Wilson (Founding Father) (1742–1798), Founding Father of the United States
- James Wilson (Colorado politician), former member of the Colorado House of Representatives
- James Wilson (Indiana politician) (1825–1867), US representative
- James Wilson I (New Hampshire politician) (1766–1839), US representative
- James Wilson II (1797–1881), US representative, son of James Wilson I
- James Wilson (Pennsylvania politician) (1779–1868), US representative
- James Wilson (Secretary of Agriculture) (1835–1920), US secretary of agriculture and US representative from Iowa
- James Charles Wilson (1816–1861), American politician in Texas
- James Clifton Wilson (1874–1951), US representative from Texas
- James F. Wilson (1828–1895), US senator and representative from Iowa
- James J. Wilson (1775–1824), US senator from New Jersey
- James M. Wilson Jr. (1918–2009), assistant secretary of state
- James Wilson (journalist) (1787–1850), Irish-American journalist, politician, and judge

== Military and revolutionary figures ==
- James Wilson (British Army officer) (1921–2004), British general
- James Wilson (explorer) (1760–1814), brought the first British missionaries to Tahiti
- James Wilson (Irish nationalist) (1836–1921), Irish republican convicted of desertion
- James Wilson (revolutionary) (1760–1820), Scottish leader of the Radical War
- James H. Wilson (1837–1925), general in the United States Army

== Sportsmen ==
- James Wilson (athlete) (1891–1973), British athlete
- James Wilson (Australian rules footballer) (c. 1855–1935), for Geelong
- James Wilson (basketball), American basketball player
- James Wilson (cricketer) (born 1978), South African cricketer
- James Wilson (darts player) (born 1972), English darts player
- James Wilson (footballer, born 1866) (c. 1866–1900), Scottish footballer
- James Wilson (footballer, born 1882), Scottish footballer (St Mirren, Preston NE)
- James Wilson (footballer, born 1884) (1884–1934), Australian rules footballer for Essendon
- James Wilson (footballer, born 1890) (1890–1917), Scottish footballer (Queen's Park)
- James Wilson (1910s footballer), English footballer
- James Wilson (footballer, born 1989), Welsh professional footballer for Bristol Rovers
- James Wilson (footballer, born 1995), English professional footballer
- James Wilson (footballer, born 2007), Scottish footballer
- James Wilson (rugby union, born 1983), New Zealand rugby player
- James Wilson (rugby union, born 1909) (1909–1994), Royal Air Force officer and Scottish rugby union player
- James Wilson (trainer) (1828–1917), founder of St. Albans Stud, Victoria, Australia
- James B. Wilson (1896–1986), American football player and coach
- James H. Wilson (American football) (1940–2013), coach

== Science and medicine ==
- James Wilson (anatomist) (1765–1821), Scottish anatomist
- James Wilson (scientist), American gene therapist
- James Wilson (zoologist) (1795–1856), Scottish zoologist
- James Wilson (mathematician) (1774?–1829), Irish mathematician
- James A. Wilson (21st century), American mathematician
- James Arthur Wilson (1795–1882), English physician
- James G. Wilson (1915–1987), embryologist and anatomist
- James George Wilson (1830–1881), Scottish surgeon and professor of midwifery
- James Ricker Wilson (1922–2007), American theoretical physicist
- James Thomas Wilson (1861–1945), British professor of anatomy

== Arts and craftspersons ==
- James Wilson (architect) (1816–1900), British architect in Bath
- James Wilson (author) (1779–1846), British author of Biography of the Blind
- James Wilson (cinematographer) (active 1927–1963), British cinematographer
- James Wilson (composer) (1922–2005), Irish composer
- James Wilson (producer) (born 1965), British film producer
- James Wilson (globe maker) (1763–1855), American globe maker
- James Wilson (songwriter), 18th-century English songwriter
- James Daniel Wilson (born 1977), English actor
- James Keys Wilson (1828–1894), American architect in Ohio
- Mark Wilson (magician) or James Wilson (1929–2021), American magician
- James Perry Wilson (1889–1976), American painter, designer, and architect

== Academics ==
- James Kinnier Wilson (1921–2022), British Assyriologist
- James Q. Wilson (1931–2012), American professor of public policy
- James Southall Wilson (1880–1963), American author, professor, and founder of the Virginia Quarterly Review
- James Wilson (philosopher), British philosopher

== Clergy ==
- James Wilson (Archdeacon of Manchester) (1836–1931), British theologian and science teacher
- James Wilson (bishop) (died 1857), Irish bishop of Cork
- James Wilson (Dean of Elphin and Ardagh), Irish Anglican clergyman
- James Wilson (Dean of Tuam), Irish Anglican clergyman
- James Hood Wilson (1829–1903), moderator of the General Assembly of the Free Church of Scotland in 1895

== Other ==
- James Wilson (civil servant) (1853–1926), British civil servant in British India
- James Wilson (unionist) (1876–1945), American labor union leader
- James Wilson (House), a character on medical drama House
- James Grant Wilson (1832–1914), American soldier, editor, and author
- James Wilson (motorcyclist) (c. 1901–1995), long-distance motorcyclist and author
- James William Wilson, Jr. (born 1969), American murderer and perpetrator of the Oakland Elementary School shooting
- James Wilson (died 1828), nicknamed "Daft Jamie", victim of Burke and Hare

== See also ==
- Jim Wilson (disambiguation)
