= Charles Williams =

Charles, Charlie, Charley, Chuck, or Chuckie Williams may refer to:

== Actors ==
- Charles Williams (English actor) (1693–1731), at Theatre Royal, Drury Lane
- Charles Williams (American actor) (1898–1958), screenwriter
- Charlie Williams (comedian) (1927–2006), English Yorkshire stand-up, former footballer

== Artists ==
- Charles Williams (caricaturist) (before 1775—1830), British illustrator
- Charles Insco Williams (1853–1923), American artist and architect in Dayton, Ohio
- Charles David Williams (1875–1954), American book and magazine illustrator (Cross burning)
- Charles Williams (artist) (born 1965), American-English Stuckist movement painter
- Charles T. Williams (1918–1966), American sculptor

== Music and dance ==
- Charles Holston Williams (1886–1978), American founder of dance company
- Charles Williams (composer) (1893–1978), English film music
- Charles Williams (musician) (born 1932), American jazz saxophonist
  - Charles Williams (album), 1971 release by saxophonist
- Charles "Hungry" Williams (1935–1986), American R&B drummer from New Orleans

== Politics ==
- Charles Williams (of Llangibby) (1591–1641), English MP in 1621
- Charles Hanbury Williams (1708–1759), Welsh MP and satirist
- Charles K. Williams (1782–1853), American governor of Vermont
- Charles Williams (before 1825–after 1865), American mayor of Rockford, Illinois, 1859–64
- Watkin Williams (Liberal politician) (Charles James Watkin Williams, 1828–1884), Welsh MP for Caernarvonshire, 1880
- Charles G. Williams (1829–1892), American congressman from Wisconsin
- Charles Henry Williams (1834–1908), English MP for Barnstaple, 1868–1874
- Charles Williams (Wisconsin state legislator) (1844–1922), American politician frmo Wisconsin
- Morgan Williams (politician) (Charles Morgan Williams, 1878–1970), New Zealand politician
- Charles Williams (Torquay MP) (1886–1955), English politician
- Charles Cromwell Williams (1896–1975), Canadian member of Legislative Assembly of Saskatchewan
- Charles Williams (Australian politician) (1890–1952), Labor member of Western Australian Legislative Council, 1928–1948
- Charles Williams, Baron Williams of Elvel (1933–2019), English MP, cricketer, businessman
- Charles A. Williams (born 1950), Assistant Secretary of the Navy (Energy, Installations and Environment), 2020-2021
- Charles Williams (Florida politician) (born 1939), American politician from Florida

== Sports ==
=== American football ===
- Charles M. Williams (coach), football and basketball at Temple University, 1894–99
- Chuck Williams (American football) (1934–2020), coach
- Monk Williams (Charles Lee Williams, 1945–2003), American football player
- Charles Williams (gridiron football) (born 1953), Canadian defensive back
- Charlie Williams (American football) (born 1972), NFL safety for Dallas Cowboys

=== Association football ===
- Charlie Williams (footballer, born 1873) (1873–1952), English goalkeeper and manager
- Charles Williams (footballer, born 1912) (1912–after 1934), English footballer
- Charlie Williams (footballer, born 1944) (1944–2026), Maltese midfielder
- Charlie Williams (comedian) (1927–2006), English centre-half, later performer

=== Baseball ===
- Charles Williams (baseball) (1894–1952), American pitcher in Negro leagues
- Charlie Williams (shortstop) (1897–1931), American shortstop in Negro leagues
- Charlie Williams (umpire) (1943–2005), first African American behind home plate in World Series
- Charlie Williams (pitcher) (1947–2015), American with Mets and Giants

=== Basketball ===
- Charlie Williams (basketball) (born 1943), American point guard
- Chuck Williams (basketball) (born 1946), American point guard
- Chuckie Williams (born 1953), American shooting guard
- Chaz Williams (born 1991), American point guard in Macedonian First League
- Charles Williams (basketball) (born 1996), American shooting guard
- Buck Williams (Charles Linwood Williams, born 1960), American basketball player

=== Combat sports ===
- Charley Williams (1928–2009), American boxer
- Charles Williams (boxer) (born 1962), American light heavyweight
- Rockin' Rebel (Charles Williams, 1966–2018), American professional wrestler

=== Other sports ===
- Charles Williams (cricketer, born 1800) (1800–1830), English underarm bowler with Marylebone
- Charles Williams (Australian footballer) (1881–1969), with Richmond in VFL
- Charles Williams (athlete) (1887–1971), English 1908 Olympian in track and field
- Charles Williams (rackets) (1888–1935), English world champion and Titanic survivor
- Charlie Williams (motorcyclist) (born 1950), English motorcyclist
- Charles Williams (rugby union) South African player, 1976–1980
- Charlie Williams (pool player) (born 1977), Korean-born American
- Charles Williams (ice hockey) (born 1992), American goaltender

== Writers ==
=== Fiction ===
- Charles Williams (British writer) (1886–1945), English novelist, member of Inklings
- Charles Williams (American author) (1909–1975), American author of suspense novels (Dead Calm, Hotspot,...)
- C. K. Williams (Charles Kenneth Williams, 1936–2015), American poet
- Charlie Williams (British writer) (born 1971), English author of The Mangel Trilogy
- Charles Williams (film director) (born 1982), Australian screenwriter-director

=== Non-fiction ===
- Charles Greville Williams (1829–1910), English scientist and analytical chemist
- Charles Frederick Williams (1838–1904), Irish-Scottish newspaper editor and war correspondent
- Charles Theodore Williams (1838–1912), English physician
- Charles Tudor Williams (1839–1914), American businessman and educator
- Charles D. Williams (1860–1923), American Episcopal bishop and theologian
- C. Dickerman Williams (1900–1998), American lawyer and freedom-of-speech advocate
- Charles Williams (priest) (1906–1961), Welsh Anglican theologian and chaplain of Merton College
- Chuck Williams (author) (1915–2015), American cookbook writer, founder of Williams-Sonoma
- Charles M. Williams (academic) (1917–2011), American professor at Harvard Business School

== Other ==
- Charles Williams (academic) (1807–1877), English principal of Jesus College, Oxford
- Charles Williams (brewer) (1850–1936), Australian pioneer in Adelaide
- Charles Williams (Royal Navy officer) (1925–2015), South African-born rear admiral
- Charles James Blasius Williams (1805–1889), English physician
- Charles Q. Williams (1933–1982), American Army major, Medal of Honor recipient
- Charles Storrow Williams (1827–1890), American civil engineer
- Charles Andrew Williams (born 1986), perpetrator of the Santana High School shooting

== See also ==
- William Charles (disambiguation)
