= Jim Wilson =

Jim, Jimmy, or Jimmie Wilson may refer to:

== Entertainment ==
- Jimmy Wilson (blues musician) (1918–1966), West Coast blues singer of the 1950s
- Jim Wilson (guitarist), guitar player for rock band Mother Superior and Rollins Band
- Jim Wilson (pianist), American pianist and songwriter
- Jimmie Wilson (singer) (born 1981), American singer
- Jim Wilson (producer), American movie producer
- Jim Wilson (comics), fictional character, friend of the Incredible Hulk and Rick Jones who later dies of AIDS
- Jimmy Wilson, fictional skateboarder from the 2003 sports comedy film Grind

== Politics ==
- Jim Wilson (California politician) (1872–1956), banker and City Council member
- Jimmie Wilson Jr., Michigan state representative
- Jim Wilson (New Brunswick politician) (1937–2005), member of the Legislative Assembly of New Brunswick
- Jim Wilson (Northern Ireland politician) (born 1941), former member of the Northern Ireland Assembly
- Jim Wilson (Oklahoma politician) (1947–2018), Oklahoma state senator
- Jim Wilson (Ontario politician) (born 1963), politician in Ontario, Canada

== Sports ==
=== Baseball ===
- Jim Wilson (pitcher) (1922–1986), American pitcher in Major League Baseball, 1945–1958
- Jim Wilson (first baseman) (born 1960), American Major League Baseball player
- Jimmie Wilson (baseball) (1900–1947), American baseball player and manager and professional soccer player
- Jimmy Wilson (Negro leagues) (1920–1997), American baseball player

=== Football ===
- James B. Wilson (1896–1986), known as Jimmie, American football player and coach
- Jim Wilson (Australian footballer) (1930–2021), Australian rules footballer for Melbourne
- Jim Wilson (footballer, born 1945) (born 1945), Scottish footballer
- Jimmy Wilson (American football) (born 1986), American football cornerback
- Jimmy Wilson (footballer, born 1909) (1909–?), British footballer
- Jimmy Wilson (footballer, born 1916) (1916–after 1939), English football inside forward who played for Lincoln City in the 1930s
- Jimmy Wilson (footballer, born 1924) (1924–1987), also known as Tug Wilson, English footballer who played for Watford in the 1950s
- Jimmy Wilson (footballer, born 1942), Scottish footballer
- Jim Wilson (soccer) (fl. 1924), Canadian international soccer player
- Jim Wilson (winger), Scottish footballer for Bolton Wanderers
- Jimmy Wilson (footballer, born 1929) (1929–2017), Scottish footballer for Mansfield Town

=== Other sports ===
- Jim Wilson (wrestler) (1942–2009), American football player, professional wrestler
- Jim Wilson (basketball) (born 1948), American professional basketball player
- Jim Wilson (curler), Canadian curler

== Other ==
- Jim Wilson (broadcaster) (born 1968), Australian television and radio presenter
- Jim Wilson (librarian) (1915–2001), deputy national librarian in New Zealand
- Jim Richard Wilson (1953–2014), director of the Opalka Gallery
- Jimmy Wilson (robber) (1904 – after 1973), African-American farmhand who was convicted of robbery and sentenced to death for stealing $1.95

== See also ==
- James Wilson (disambiguation)
