= Harry Keeling =

Harry Keeling may refer to:

- Harry Keeling (cricketer)
- Harry Keeling (footballer)
