= Featherby =

Featherby is a surname. Notable people with the surname include:

- Clive Featherby (1933–2019), British motorcycle speedway rider
- Len Featherby (1905–1972), English footballer
- Peter Featherby (born 1951), Australian rules footballer
- John Robert Featherby (1848–1922), English brick manufacturer, businessman, and civic leader
- William Featherby (1888–1958), English cricketer

== Fictional characters ==
Mrs. Featherby, character on the TV show DuckTales
