= J. H. Wilson =

James Harold Wilson (1916–1995) was Prime Minister of the United Kingdom from 1964 to 1970 and from 1974 to 1976.

J. H. Wilson may also refer to:

- James H. Wilson (American football) (1940–2013), American college football coach
- James H. Wilson (1837–1925), American topographic engineer, a Union Army Major General in the American Civil War and later wars, a railroad executive, and author
- John Hardie Wilson (1858–1920), Scottish botanist and photographer
