= Hall Garth =

Building in Goodmanham, East Riding of Yorkshire, England

Coordinates: 53°52′32″N 0°38′50″W

Hall Garth is a historic building in Goodmanham, a village in the East Riding of Yorkshire, in England.

The house was built between 1823 and 1824, to a Regency design by Charles Mountain. It was originally the rectory of All Hallows' Church, Goodmanham, and was commissioned by William Blow, the long-serving rector. In the late 1950s, the house was restored by Francis Johnson, for Waechter de Grimston. Johnson also designed a Summer house in the grounds, in the Doric order, with a pediment. The house was grade II* listed in 1967. It has extensive grounds, with mature trees.

The house is built of pale grey brick on a plinth, with stone dressings, a moulded timber eaves cornice, and a hipped slate roof. It has two storeys and is five bays wide. On the centre is a Roman Doric tetrastyle portico, with a triglyph frieze, a mutule cornice and a blocking course, and the doorway has pilasters. The ground floor windows are cross-mullion casements under cambered gauged brick arches. On the upper floor is a tripartite casement window with pilasters and a cornice, flanked by sash windows with segmental gauged brick heads. On the garden front is a full-height bow window, and there is a fine interior. This includes much original plasterwork and woodwork. Original fireplaces include one designed by Henry Cheere in the mid-18th century, and brought from Kilnwick Hall.

== See also ==
- Grade II* listed buildings in the East Riding of Yorkshire
- Listed buildings in Goodmanham
