= Mary Andross =

Scottish food chemist

Mary Ann Andross
- Born: 15 March 1893; Irvine, North Ayrshire, Scotland
- Died: 22 February 1968 (aged 74)
- Education: University of Glasgow

Mary Andross (1893–1968) was a Scottish food chemist and one of the leading pioneers of dietetics.

== Early life ==
Andross was born on 15 March 1893 in Irvine, Scotland. Her father, Henry Andross, was a cashier. He built a home for his family on Bank Street in 1901 where Andross lived for most of her life.

She was an athletic child, but a car accident during her early years meant she lost much of the use of her legs. However, she continued to live an active life and enjoyed fishing on Harris.

== Academic career ==
Andross enrolled in the University of Glasgow in 1912. She studied various scientific subjects, including anatomy, organic chemistry, zoology, natural philosophy and physiology. She graduated in 1916 with a BSc in Science and Engineering.

After graduation she undertook postgraduate work at the Technical College and then at the University of Glasgow. She taught at Irvine Royal Academy between 1916 and 1917, then worked at the Ministry of Munitions Inspections Department on poison gases from 1917 to 1919. Afterwards, she returned to the University of Glasgow to work as a Chemistry Assistant until 1923.

She eventually became the Head of the Science Department of the Glasgow and West of Scotland College of Domestic Science, where she remained for 40 years until she retired in 1965.

Andross became a Fellow of the Royal Institute of Chemistry in 1951, of the Institute of Food Science and Technology in 1964, and was a member of the Nutrition Society and the Society of Chemical Industry.

== World War II efforts ==
During World War II, Andross made three major contributions to the field of dietetics:

1. Carried out research on the sources of vitamin C, in particular rose hips. In order to encourage increased vitamin C intake among the general public, Andross developed recipes that could easily be prepared at home.
2. Helped to organise a canteen for servicemen in St Enoch Station.
3. Promoted the idea of preserving fruits and vegetables and helped to establish a service providing preserved foods to the general public. Andross herself canned, bottled and pickled foods, while also leading a team of staff who used their holiday time to deliver services in rural areas.

== Death ==
Andross died on 22 February 1968.
