= Leslie Butler =

Leslie Butler may refer to:

- Leslie Butler (cricketer), New Zealand cricketer
- Leslie B. Butler, American politician
- Leslie Butler (athlete), English athlete
- Leslie Butler (footballer), English footballer
