= Albert Robinson =

Albert Robinson may refer to:

- Albert Alonzo Robinson (1844–1918), American civil engineer
- Albert H. Robinson (1881–1956), Canadian artist
- Albert Robinson (sprinter) (born 1964), American Olympic sprinter
- Albert Robinson (Australian politician) (1877–1943), Australian Senator and member of the South Australian House of Assembly
- Albert Robinson (Kentucky politician) (1938–2024), American politician
- Albert Robinson (footballer, born 1948) (1948–1995), footballer for Chester City
- Albert Robinson (footballer, born 1913) (1913–?), English footballer for Mansfield Town
- Albert Robinson (priest) (1863–1948), British Anglican priest
- Al Robinson (1947–1974), American boxer
