= Alexander MacAra =

Scottish public health physician (1932–2012)

Sir Alexander MacAra FRCP FRCGP
- Born: Alexander Wiseman MacAra; 4 May 1932; Irvine, North Ayrshire, Scotland
- Died: 21 June 2012 (aged 80)
- Citizenship: British
- Education: London School of Hygiene & Tropical Medicine
- Scientific career
- Workplaces: Bristol University; British Medical Association

Alexander Wiseman MacAra FRCP FRCGP (4 May 1932 – 21 June 2012), also known as Sandy MacAra, was a Scottish professor of epidemiology at Bristol University and chairman of British Medical Association (BMA) from 1993 to 1998.

== Early life ==
Alexander Wiseman MacAra was born on 4 May 1932 in Irvine, North Ayrshire, Scotland. Both his father and grandfather were Church of Scotland Ministers. Marion, his mother, was a civil servant. When he was six years old, MacAra was treated for paratyphoid fever, acute appendicitis and whooping cough.

MacAra was educated at Irvine Royal Academy. He studied at the Glasgow Medical School, Glasgow University, graduating with a medical degree in 1958. He went on to gain a DPH from the London School of Hygiene & Tropical Medicine in 1960.

== Early career ==
- 1963 – 1997 Lecturer in Public Health, and later Consultant Senior Lecturer in Public Health, Bristol University
- 1960s Founding member and subsequently Head of Department of Epidemiology and Public Health Medicine, Bristol University

== Career ==
From 1993 to 1998 MacAra was the chair of the ruling council of British Medical Association (BMA). He was consultant to the World Health Organisation (for over 20 years ), and he was president of the National Heart Forum. He was a member of the Council of the General Medical Council (GMC)

== Campaigning ==
MacAra played a key role in smoking ban in public places which was introduced in 2007. In 2009 he called for the MMR vaccine to be made compulsory following an unfounded health scare which resulted in a fall in the take up rate of the vaccine within the UK.

== Honours ==
MacAra was a Fellow of the Royal College of Physicians (FRCP). In 1992 he received an honorary degree- Honorary Doctor of Public Health, Athens. He was created a Knight Bachelor in the 1998 Birthday Honours for services to the medical profession and was elected an inaugural Fellow of the Academy of Medical Sciences in the same year.

== Personal life ==
MacAra was married to Sylvia and they had two children, a daughter, Alexandra, and a son, James. He died on 21 June 2012.

== Obituaries ==
- British Medical Association (BMA) Link 1 Link 2
- BBC Link
- Scottish Herald Link
- The Telegraph
- The Guardian Link
- Bristol University Link
- Royal College of Physicians of Edinburgh (RCPE)
- Perspectives in Public Health (journal) Link

Academic offices
Preceded by Jeremy Lee-Potter	Chairman of the British Medical Association; 1993–1998	Succeeded by Ian Bogle
