= Claude White (footballer) =

English footballer

Personal information
- Full name: Claude White
- Date of birth: 12 January 1904
- Place of birth: Mansfield, England
- Date of death: 1981 (aged 76–77)
- Position: Defender

Senior career*
Years	Team	Apps	(Gls)
1928	Hillstown Welfare		
1929	Shirebrook Miners Welfare		
1930	Wombwell Town		
1931–1932	Mansfield Town	1	(0)
- * Club domestic league appearances and goals

Claude White (12 January 1904 – 1981) was an English footballer who played for Mansfield Town.
