= Tom Maddison =

English footballer

Personal information
- Full name: Thomas Maddison
- Date of birth: 16 December 1910
- Place of birth: Sutton-in-Ashfield, England
- Position: Defender

Senior career*
Years	Team	Apps	(Gls)
1933–1934	Mansfield Town	0	(0)
1934	SC Nîmes		
- * Club domestic league appearances and goals

Thomas Maddison (16 December 1910 – unknown) was an English footballer who played for Mansfield Town. Maddison played twice for Mansfield in the 1933–34 season, both matches coming in cup competitions, against New Brighton in the FA Cup and Walsall in the Football League Third Division North Cup.

In December 1934, he joined SC Nîmes, who played in the French Division 1.
