= Listed buildings in Goodmanham =

Goodmanham is a civil parish in the county of the East Riding of Yorkshire, England. It contains six listed buildings that are recorded in the National Heritage List for England. Of these, one is listed at Grade I, the highest of the three grades, one is at Grade II*, the middle grade, and the others are at Grade II, the lowest grade. The parish contains the village of Goodmanham and the surrounding countryside. The listed buildings consist of a church, houses, a former rectory and a milestone.

== Key ==
Grade	Criteria
I	Buildings of exceptional interest, sometimes considered to be internationally important
II*	Particularly important buildings of more than special interest
II	Buildings of national importance and special interest

== Buildings ==
Name and location	Photograph	Date	Notes	Grade
All Hallows' Church; 53.87685°N 0.64790°W		12th century	The church has been altered and extended through the centuries, including restorations and alterations by Temple Moore from 1894. It is built in stone with lead roofs, and consists of a nave with a clerestory, a north aisle, a south porch, a chancel and a west tower. The tower has two stages, buttresses, a chamfered string course, two-light square-headed bell openings with four-centred arched heads and hood moulds, and an embattled parapet with gargoyles and grotesques. The porch is gabled and has an entrance with a pointed head, and the inner doorway is Norman, with an ornamented round arch.	I
The Old Hall; 53.87714°N 0.64777°W		1686	The house, later divided, is in limestone and red brick on a plinth, and has a pantile roof with tumbled-in brick to the raised gables. There are two storeys and attics, and three bays. On the front are two doorways in recessed porches, on the centre of the upper floor is an oriel window, the other windows are horizontally sliding sashes, and there is a central roof dormer.	II
Southwold Farmhouse; 53.88482°N 0.59774°W	—	Mid-18th century	The farmhouse, which was later extended, is in red brick, with a floor band, a dentilled brick eaves cornice and a pantile roof. There are two storeys and three bays, and to the right is a later taller extension with two storeys and one bay. On the centre of the main range is a porch flanked by sash windows in architraves with flat brick arches, and the upper floor contains horizontally sliding sashes. On the extension, the sash windows have cambered heads.	II
All Hallows House; 53.87640°N 0.64881°W		Late 18th century	A terrace of houses and a former chapel combined into one house, it is in orange brick with a pantile roof. The former terrace on the right has two storeys and seven bays, the right four bays lower. The doorway has an architrave and a decorative fanlight, and the windows are sashes under segmental arches. On the upper floor are two oculi. The chapel has one storey and three bays. Steps lead up to the central round-arched doorway, above it is an oculus, and the outer bays contain pointed sash windows.	II
Hall Garth; 53.87564°N 0.64734°W	—	1823–24	A rectory, later a private house, in pale grey brick on a plinth, with stone dressings, a moulded timber eaves cornice, and a hipped slate roof. There are two storeys and five bays. On the centre is a Roman Doric tetrastyle portico, with a triglyph frieze, a mutule cornice and a blocking course, and the doorway has pilasters. The ground floor windows are cross-mullion casements under cambered gauged brick arches. On the upper floor is a tripartite casement window with pilasters and a cornice, flanked by sash windows with segmental gauged brick heads. On the garden front is a full-height bow window, and there is a fine interior.	II*
Milestone; 53.87703°N 0.64590°W		Early 19th century (probable)	The milestone is on the north side of Main Street, and consists of a sandstone slab with a rounded top. It is inscribed with the distances to Driffield and Market Weighton.	II
