= Chris Staniforth =

English footballer

Personal information
- Full name: Archer Christopher Staniforth
- Date of birth: 26 September 1895
- Place of birth: Carrington, England
- Date of death: 1954 (aged 58–59)
- Height: 5 ft 9 in (1.75 m)
- Position: Winger

Senior career*
Years	Team	Apps	(Gls)
1919	Creswell Athletic		
1920	Creswell Colliery		
1921	Mansfield Town		
1922–1923	Oldham Athletic	35	(7)
1923	Mansfield Town		
1924–1925	Notts County	39	(8)
1926	Mansfield Town		
1927–1928	Notts County	27	(14)
1928	Mansfield Town		
1929	Shirebrook		
1930	Grantham		
1931–1932	Mansfield Town	8	(2)
1932	Sutton Town		
1933	Worksop Town		
1934	Creswell Colliery		
- * Club domestic league appearances and goals

Archer Christopher Staniforth (26 September 1895 – 1954) was an English footballer who played for Mansfield Town, Notts County and Oldham Athletic.
