= Tom McKillop =

Scottish chemist

Sir Thomas Fulton Wilson McKillop (born 19 March 1943) is a Scottish chemist, who was CEO of AstraZeneca PLC from 1999 until 2006 and chairman of the RBS Group from 2006 until 2008.

== Early life ==
McKillop was born in Dreghorn, a small village in North Ayrshire. He was educated at Irvine Royal Academy and then Glasgow University, where he took a BSc (Hons) and PhD in chemistry. He joined the ICI Petrochemical & Polymer Laboratory (later renamed the ICI Corporate Laboratory) at Runcorn in 1969 after post-doctoral research work in Paris. He moved to ICI Pharmaceuticals Division in 1975 and, having held a number of positions in research, in 1989 he was appointed technical director of ICI with international responsibilities for research, development and production.

== Zeneca ==
In 1993, ICI Pharmaceuticals demerged to become Zeneca, and in 1994 he was appointed chief executive officer of the new company. In April 1999, Zeneca merged with Astra to form AstraZeneca PLC. McKillop led the merger and became chief executive officer (CEO) of the merged company, which became one of the leading pharmaceutical companies in the world. He retired from AstraZeneca on 1 January 2006, when David Brennan took over as AstraZeneca's CEO. McKillop became the chairman of the Royal Bank of Scotland (RBS). His brother, Alexander McKillop, was professor of organic chemistry at the University of East Anglia from 1970 to 1996.

== RBS ==
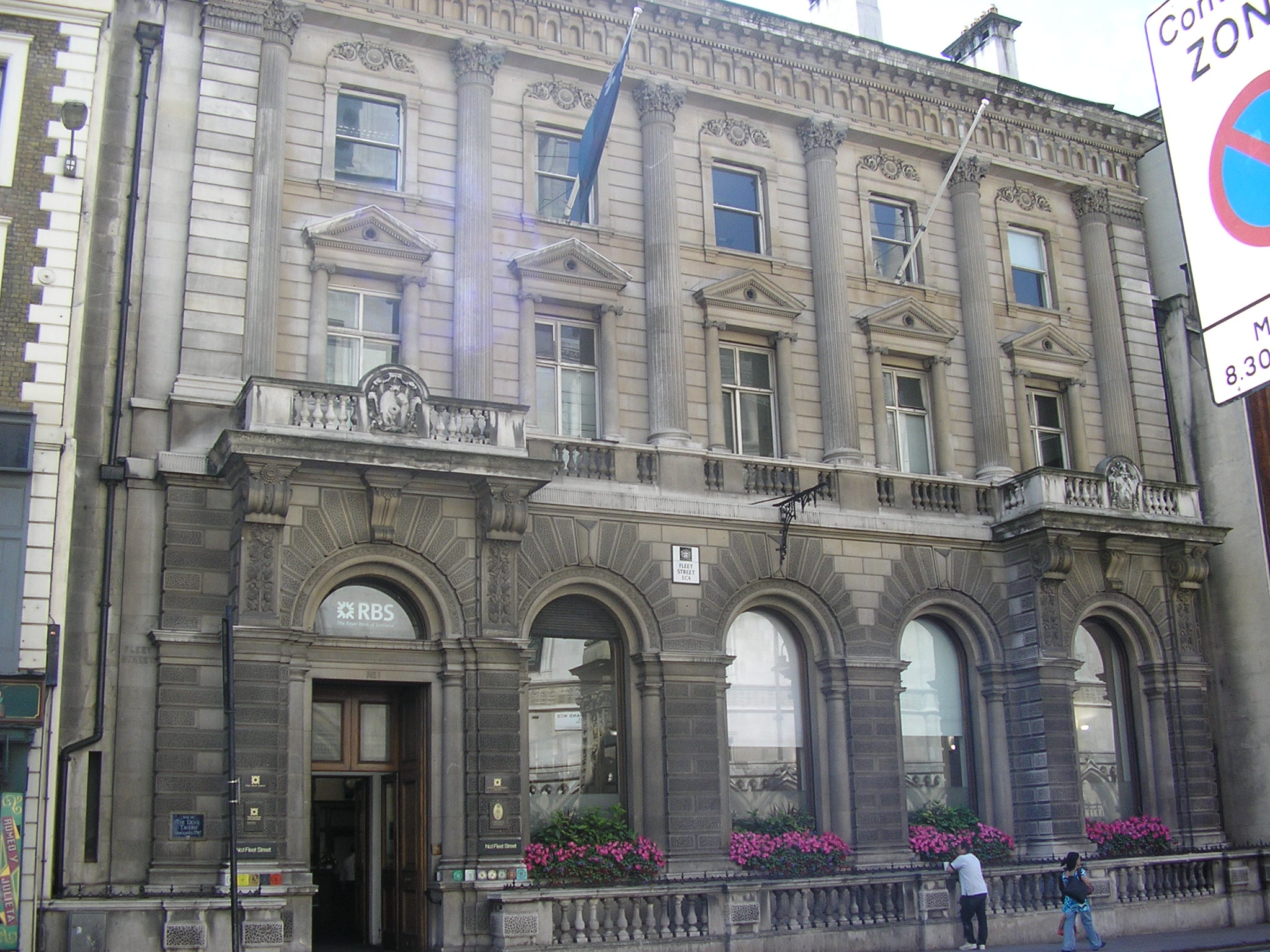
Royal Bank of Scotland's office in Fleet Street, London

McKillop then changed from chemistry to banking in 2006. He was chairman RBS from when it accrued a debt of £45 billion, working with CEO Fred Goodwin, who promoted aggressive expansion of the bank by acquiring other banks.

On 13 October 2008, British Prime Minister Gordon Brown announced a UK government bailout of £45 billion of new capital into Royal Bank of Scotland. RBS has accrued a further debt of £58 billion since 2008.

By 2008 RBS was the fifth-largest bank in the world by market capitalisation. It rose while aggressively pursuing leveraged buyouts which include debt transferral of acquired companies; for example RBS acquired ABN Amro for €71 billion, while ABN transpired to be worth only half of that.

From the time that Goodwin took over as chief executive until 2007, RBS's assets quadrupled, its cost-to-income ratio improved markedly, and its profits soared. In 2006 pre-tax profits climbed 16% to £9.2 billion with most of the growth coming from its investment banking business.

However, following a shareholder crisis meeting in the midst of a $12bn rights issue, McKillop was criticized for "re-arranging the cosy deck-chairs on the sinking titanic", and Goodwin was criticised by RBS shareholders for selling shares at half the price of the shareholder's given value. Having nearly trebled between February 2000 and May 2002 the share price halved from 2006 to 2008. It had lost 95% of its value by 2009.

However, in early 2007, the Dutch bank ABN AMRO was under pressure from hedge funds, including Chris Hohn of the hedge fund TCI, to break itself up to maximise shareholder value. ABN chief executive Rijkman Groenink suspected RBS of acting in concert with the hedge fund Tosca, which was chaired by former RBS chairman Mathewson and recommended the takeover bid of an RBS consortium for €71 billion, against the proposed merger with Barclays Bank for €61 billion. Goodwin arranged a consortium of RBS, Fortis and former RBS shareholders Grupo Santander, to purchase the assets of ABN AMRO and break them up in a three-way split. According to the proposed deal, RBS would take over ABN's Chicago operations, LaSalle Bank, and ABN's wholesale operations; while Santander would take the Brazilian operations and Fortis would take the Dutch operations. In a manoeuvre "labelled in all quarters as a poison pill" ABN AMRO agreed to sell key RBS target LaSalle to Bank of America for $21bn, but in July 2007 the consortium offered the same $98bn for ABN's remaining assets, with a higher cash component (93%).

The deal was struck in October 2007, just before the 2008 financial crisis, with Barclays withdrawing its €61 billion bid and ABN's shareholders endorsing the €71 billion RBS takeover. Coming after the nationalisation of Northern Rock due to the freezing of the wholesale money markets, the deal proved the final straw for RBS, as it severely weakened its balance sheet not only through the size of the acquisition but due to ABN AMRO's substantial exposure to the US subprime mortgage crisis.

While at RBS, the value of the bank's shares fell below a quarter of their level in early 2007. Following criticism from the press for the takeover of ABN AMRO and the UK government having to bail out the bank, McKillop announced his early retirement as chairman of the Royal Bank of Scotland on 13 October 2008. At a meeting of the Treasury Select Committee of the House of Commons on 10 February 2009, he admitted to having no qualifications in banking. Like the other retired bankers present, he apologised for the bankruptcy for RBS.

== Family ==
Thomas married Elizabeth Kettle in 1966 with whom he has three children and 8 grandchildren.

== Awards ==
- 2002 Knighted in the 2002 Queen's Birthday honour's list for services to the pharmaceuticals industry.
- 2002 Elected Fellow of the Academy of Medical Sciences
- 2003 Elected Fellow of the Royal Society of Edinburgh
- June 2004 – awarded an honorary doctor of Sciences by the University of St Andrews
- 2005 Elected Fellow of the Royal Society
- 2005 Annual Centenary Medal, Society of Chemical Industry
- 2006 Honorary Doctorate from Heriot-Watt University
- 2007 Royal Medal of the Royal Society of Edinburgh
- Honorary Fellow of the Royal Society of Chemistry
- Honorary Fellow of the Institution of Chemical Engineers
- Recipient of 14 Honorary Degrees (Manchester, Huddersfield, Glasgow, Leicester, Middlesex, Nottingham, Dundee, Central Lancashire, Salford, St Andrews, Manchester, Paisley, Heriot-Watt, Lancaster)

== Other positions ==
- Non-executive director of BP (2005–2009)
- Non-executive Director Lloyds TSB (1999–2004)
- Chairman of the British Pharma Group
- Pro-chancellor of the University of Leicester
- President of the European Federation of Pharmaceutical Industries and Associations
- Chairman of the North West Science Council.
- President of the Science Council (2007–2011)
- Chairman of Evolva Holding AG (2012–2016)
- Director of Almirall SA (2007–2024)
- Non-executive Director of Alere Inc (2013–2017)
- Non-executive Director of UCB S A (2009–2016)
- Non-executive Director of Amersham International
- President of Society of Chemical Industry (2003–2004)

== See also ==
- The Royal Bank of Scotland
