= All Hallows' Church, Goodmanham =

Church in Goodmanham, East Riding of Yorkshire, England

Coordinates: 53°52′37″N 0°38′53″W

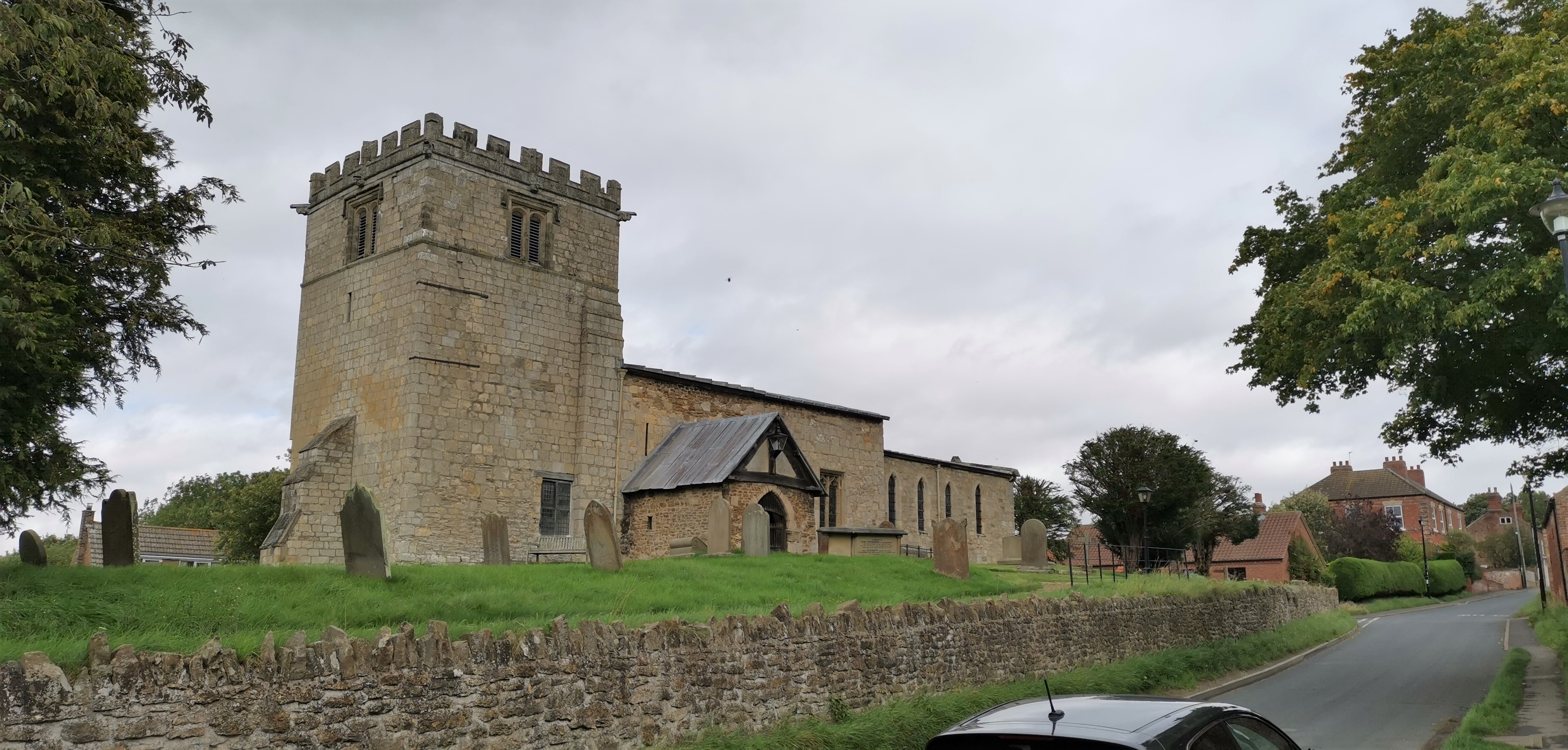
The church, in 2020

All Hallows' Church, also known as All Saints' Church, is the parish church of Goodmanham, a village in the East Riding of Yorkshire, in England.

A church was built in Goodmanham in 627, after Coifi, the chief priest of Edwin of Northumbria, converted to Christianity. The oldest part of the current building is the early-12th century nave. A north aisle was added in the 1190s, and the lower parts of the tower are of similar date. The chancel was added in the 13th century, and a porch in the 14th century. The roof was replaced, probably in the early 16th century, and restored in 1923. The church was altered by Temple Moore between 1894 and 1920 and was grade I listed in 1986.

The church is built of stone with lead roofs, and consists of a nave with a clerestory, a north aisle, a south porch, a chancel and a west tower. The tower has two stages, buttresses, a chamfered string course, two-light square-headed bell openings with four-centred arched heads and hood moulds, and an embattled parapet with gargoyles and grotesques. The porch is gabled and has an entrance with a pointed head, and the inner doorway is Norman, with an ornamented round arch. Inside, there are two fonts, one perhaps 12th century, is hexagonal and was retrieved from a nearby farmyard in 1850. The other, from 1530, is octagonal and heavily ornamented.

== See also ==
- Grade I listed buildings in the East Riding of Yorkshire
- Listed buildings in Goodmanham
