= Goodmanham =

Village and civil parish in the East Riding of Yorkshire, England

Coordinates: 53°52′35″N 0°38′57″W

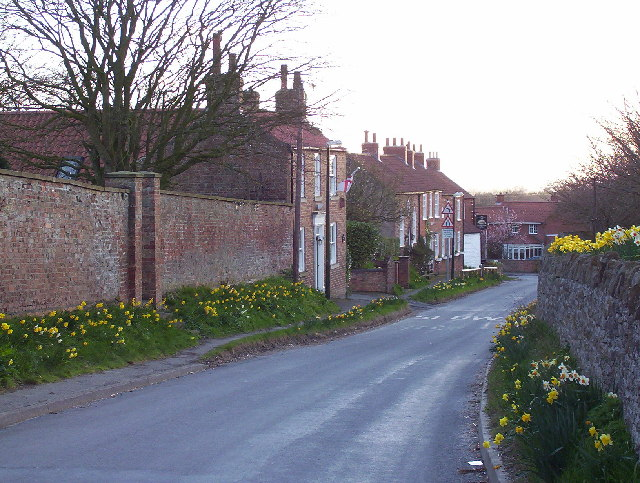
- Goodmanham village centre by the church

- Location within the East Riding of Yorkshire
- Population: 244 (2011 census)
- OS grid reference: SE889431
  - London: 165 mi (266 km) S
- Civil parish: Goodmanham
- Unitary authority: East Riding of Yorkshire
- Ceremonial county: East Riding of Yorkshire
- Region: Yorkshire and the Humber
- Country: England
- Sovereign state: United Kingdom
- Post town: YORK
- Postcode district: YO43
- Dialling code: 01430
- Police: Humberside
- Fire: Humberside
- Ambulance: Yorkshire
- UK Parliament: Bridlington and The Wolds

Goodmanham (historically Godmundingaham, the home of the people of Godmund) is a small village and civil parish in the East Riding of Yorkshire, England. It is situated approximately 2 miles (3 km) to the north-east of Market Weighton. The village is situated on the Yorkshire Wolds Way National Trail, a long-distance footpath. According to the 2011 UK Census, Goodmanham parish had a population of 244, an increase on the 2001 UK Census figure of 218.

The village is built on a south-facing slope of the Yorkshire Wolds between two streams. The area features a natural water supply from multiple springs alongside deposits of limestone, which has historically been used as a local building material. The surrounding land is noted for its agricultural fertility and archaeological evidence indicates human habitation dating back to prehistoric times.

== History ==
=== Prehistory to Roman occupation ===
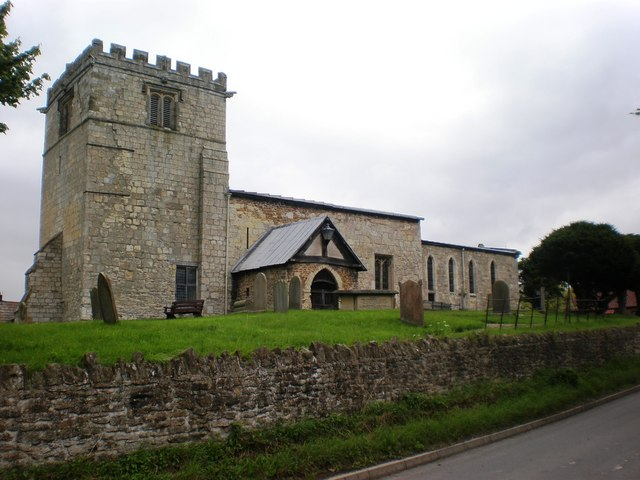
All Hallows’ Church, Goodmanham

The earliest traces of settlement are from the Stone Age. There are many ancient burial sites. The boundaries of the village lie along the lines of ancient earthworks and these are evidence that it was a prehistoric place of worship. Near the western boundary of the village lies one of the most ancient roads of Britain, later adopted by the Romans. Settlement at this time is indicated by finds of Samian ware and coins of the period.

=== Middle Ages ===
In the Anglo-Saxon period, after the recall of the Roman legions, the village reached a position of great importance and fame.

According to Bede in the Ecclesiastical History of the English People, Goodmanham was the site of a heathen temple. His account begins with Eadwine of Deira calling a meeting of his wise men regarding whether or not to adopt Christianity in 627 CE. He describes how the primus pontificum ("high priest") Coifi gave speech about the uselessness of worshipping the traditional gods and supported adopting Christianity. After breaking taboos such as mounting a stallion and bearing arms, both of which were provided by the king, he rides to the temple at Goodmanham and orders it to be torn down and burnt by his companions. Some aspects of this narrative are historically accurate such as the name of Goodmanham and likely the name Coifi. The general description of the temple is also consistent with evidence of religious buildings from English and other closely related cultural groups such as the temple at Uppsala. Despite this, the overall narrative and Coifi's role in is generally regarded as ahistorical by scholars, being drawn principally from other Christian texts. It is believed that narrative is broadly an invention with Bede having been focused on biblical exegesis and reflecting on the concept of Redemption rather than accurately recording what happened.

Although Goodmanham is very near to York, the capital of Viking England, we have no information about Goodmanham from that period. It is next found as a listing in the Domesday Book of 1086, produced under William the Conqueror at the time of the Norman Conquest. A few names of resident farmers are given: Colgri, Orm, Norman, William de Coleville. These names show the presence of Normans now occupying the land.

All Hallows' Church, Goodmanham stands on or near the site of the original pagan temple. This church dates from around 1130 AD and replaces an earlier one of wooden construction built in the Saxon period. The church was designated a Grade I listed building in 1986 and is now recorded in the National Heritage List for England, maintained by Historic England. Its former rectory is now Hall Garth.

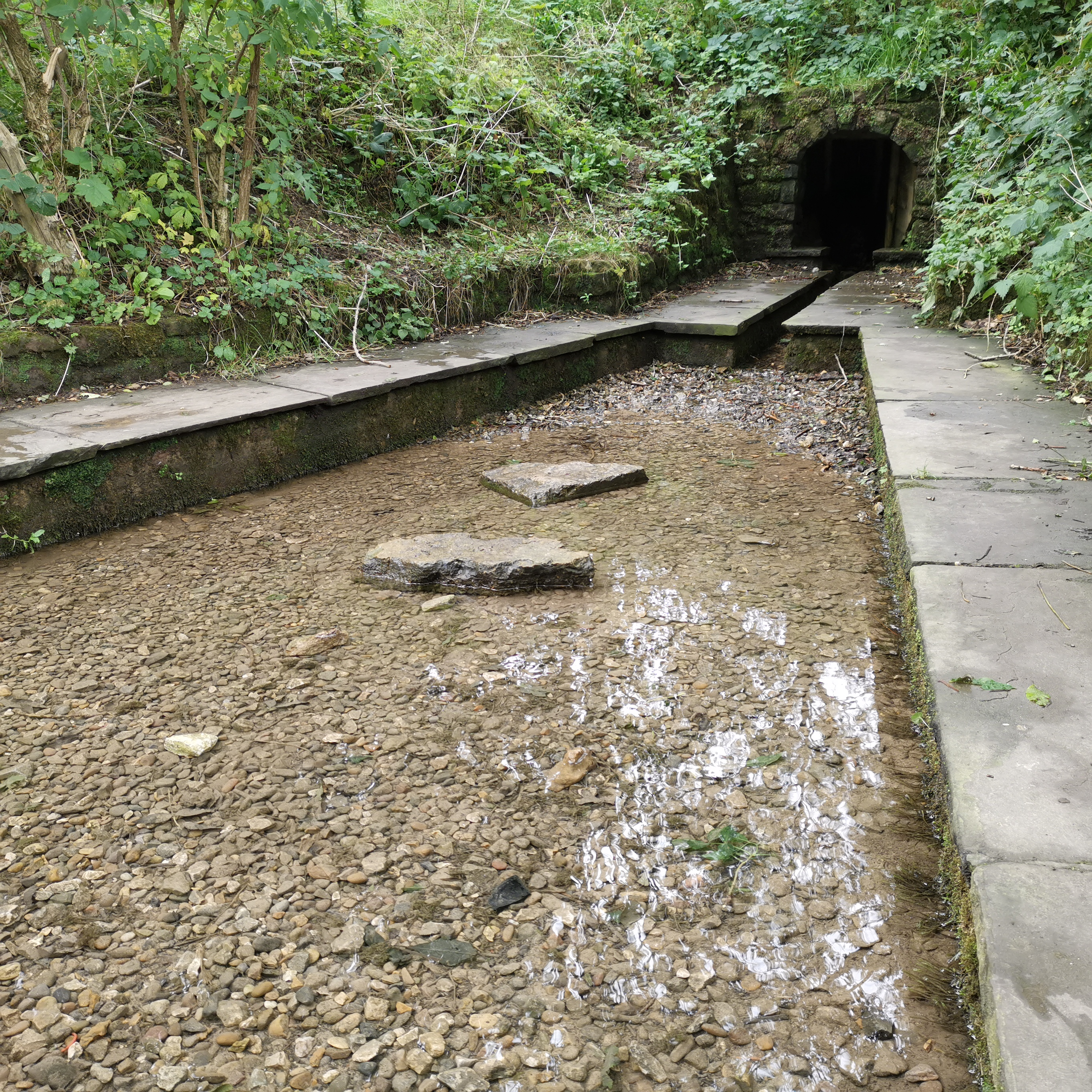
St Helena's Well

=== Other notable features ===
A tumulus, located to the south-west of the village, is also supposed to contain ruins.

The village is home to two holy wells: a well dedicated to St Helena, and a spring that is known as the "Lady Well", which was once used for baptisms.

In 1823 Baines' History, Directory and Gazetteer of the County of York gave an alternative Goodmanham name of "Godmundin Graham". The village was a parish in the Wapentake of Harthill, and partly in the Liberty of St Peter. Population at the time was 220, with occupations including fifteen farmers, a boot & shoe maker, a corn miller, a shoemaker, a wheelwright, a blacksmith who was also the parish clerk, and the licensed victualler of The Star public house. A carrier operated between the village and Market Weighton and Beverley once a week.

== Notable people ==
- Richard Foster (20 August 1856 – 5 January 1932). He emigrated to South Australia in 1880. Held various posts including Commissioner for Public Works, Minister for Industry, Minister for Works and Railways.
- William Featherby (18 August 1888 – 20 November 1958), county cricketer for Yorkshire, lived and worked locally to Goodmanham all his life. He is buried in the churchyard.

== See also ==
- Listed buildings in Goodmanham
