= Jimmy Wilson (footballer, born 1916) =

English footballer

Personal information
- Full name: James Wilson
- Date of birth: 1916
- Place of birth: Seaham Harbour, County Durham, England
- Position: Inside right

Senior career*
Years	Team	Apps	(Gls)
–	Seaham Colliery		
1937–1939	Lincoln City	36	(8)
1939–19??	Derby County	0	(0)
–	Linfield		
- * Club domestic league appearances and goals

James Wilson (1916 – after 1939) was a footballer who scored 8 goals from 36 appearances in the Football League playing for Lincoln City as an inside right. He joined Derby County in the 1939 close season, and played one First Division match before the league was suspended for the duration of the Second World War. He later played for Northern Ireland club Linfield.
