= James Wilson (New Zealand politician, born 1814) =

New Zealand politician and farmer (1814–1898)

James Wilson (1814–1898) was a New Zealand farmer and politician. He was born in Prestwick, Ayrshire, Scotland in 1814. He was a member of the Southland Provincial Council representing the Waihopai electorate from 1861 to 1867 and again from 1869 to 1870, and the Waianiwa electorate from 1867 to 1869. He served on the council's executive from 1869 to 1870 and was the council's speaker from 1864 to 1869, and was briefly Deputy Superintendent from July to September 1870.
