= Billy Cupit =

English footballer

Personal information
- Full name: William Cupit
- Date of birth: 25 January 1908
- Place of birth: Huthwaite, England
- Date of death: 1992 (aged 83–84)
- Position: Winger

Senior career*
Years	Team	Apps	(Gls)
1930	Sutton Junction		
1931–1932	Luton Town	8	(1)
1932–1933	Mansfield Town	2	(0)
1933	Sutton Town		
- * Club domestic league appearances and goals

William Cupit (25 January 1908 – 1992) was an English professional footballer who played in the Football League for Luton Town and Mansfield Town.
