= Charles Williams (basketball) =

American basketball player

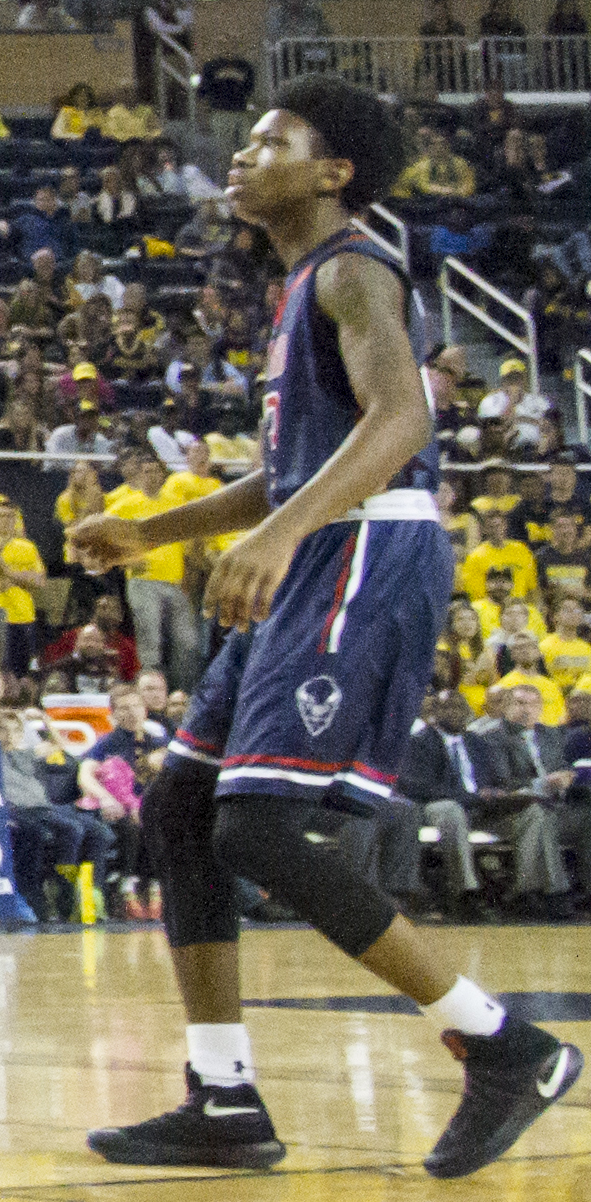
- Williams with the Howard Bison in 2016

B.B.C. Etzella
- Position: Shooting guard
- League: Total League

Personal information
- Born: September 11, 1996 (age 30)
- Listed height: 6 ft 6 in (1.98 m)
- Listed weight: 180 lb (82 kg)

Career information
- High school: Evangel Christian School (Dale City, Virginia); Millwood School (Midlothian, Virginia)
- College: Howard (2016–2020)
- NBA draft: 2020: undrafted

Career history
- 2021–present: B.B.C. Etzella

Career highlights
- 2× First-team All-MEAC (2018, 2019); Second-team All-MEAC (2020); Third-team All-MEAC (2017); MEAC Rookie of the Year (2017); MEAC All-Rookie Team (2017)

Charles Williams Jr. (born September 11, 1996) is an American professional basketball player. He played college basketball for the Howard Bison between 2016 and 2020 where he became the Mid-Eastern Athletic Conference's all-time leading scorer. As of 2021–22 he plays for B.B.C. Etzella in Luxembourg.

== Early life ==
Williams started playing basketball at age four and grew up playing in a local recreational league in Petersburg, Virginia. He drew inspiration from Kobe Bryant and was nicknamed "Bean" after Bryant's middle name. Williams attended Evangel Christian School in Dale City, Virginia before moving to Millwood School in Midlothian, Virginia for his sophomore season. In his first year, he was a member of Millwood's inaugural varsity basketball team. In the same season, Williams helped his team win the Virginia Independent Schools Athletic Association Division III state championship, scoring 28 points in the title game. As a senior, he was a first-team all-league selection. Williams committed to play college basketball for Howard in part because of his father's relationship with head coach Kevin Nickelberry.

== College career ==
In his freshman season at Howard, Williams was named Mid-Eastern Athletic Conference (MEAC) Rookie of the Week seven times and scored a career-high 37 points in a 73–70 loss to Savannah State on January 28, 2017. He averaged 15.7 points per game and was named MEAC Rookie of the Year and Third Team All-MEAC. As a sophomore, he was joined in Howard's back court by R. J. Cole. Williams averaged 20.4 points per game, which ranked second in the MEAC behind Cole, and became the second fastest player to reach 1,000 career points in program history. He was named to the First Team All-MEAC. In his junior season, he averaged 17.9 points per game, finishing second in the MEAC behind Cole, and earned First Team All-MEAC honors for his second time. He declared for the 2019 NBA draft before deciding to return to Howard. On November 30, 2019, as a senior, he became Howard's all-time leading scorer after posting 13 points in a loss to Mount St. Mary's. Williams scored a season-high 34 points on January 14, 2020, in a 101–95 overtime loss to South Carolina State. On February 22, he became the all-time leading scorer in the MEAC, surpassing Delaware State's Tom Davis, who played from 1987 to 1991. In his senior season, he averaged 18.5 points and 4.3 rebounds per game and was a Second Team All-MEAC selection.

== Professional career ==
After going undrafted in the 2020 NBA draft, Williams eventually signed with B.B.C. Etzella in 2021, a team in Luxembourg's Total League, the highest men's basketball league in that country.

== Career statistics ==
Legend
GP	Games played	GS	Games started	MPG	Minutes per game
FG%	Field goal percentage	3P%	3-point field goal percentage	FT%	Free throw percentage
RPG	Rebounds per game	APG	Assists per game	SPG	Steals per game
BPG	Blocks per game	PPG	Points per game	**Bold**	Career high

=== College ===
Year	Team	GP	GS	MPG	FG%	3P%	FT%	RPG	APG	SPG	BPG	PPG
2016–17	Howard	**34**	25	30.0	.396	.342	.759	2.6	.6	.6	.4	15.6
2017–18	Howard	33	**33**	**35.5**	**.446**	**.409**	.782	3.4	.6	**.8**	.3	**20.4**
2018–19	Howard	33	**33**	31.1	**.446**	.373	**.855**	2.7	.7	.7	.3	17.9
2019–20	Howard	33	31	34.2	.414	.300	.702	**4.3**	**1.2**	.7	**.5**	18.5
Career		133	122	32.7	.426	.357	.766	3.2	.8	.7	.4	18.1

== Personal life ==
Williams' father, Charles Sr., played college basketball for Virginia State. In September 2018, his mother, Michelle Watts, was diagnosed with Stage 2 breast cancer, before eventually recovering.

== See also ==
- List of NCAA Division I men's basketball career scoring leaders
