= Eddie Munnings =

English footballer

Personal information
- Full name: Charles Edward Munnings
- Date of birth: 6 July 1906
- Place of birth: Boston, Lincolnshire, England
- Date of death: March 1995 (aged 88)
- Position: Winger

Senior career*
Years	Team	Apps	(Gls)
1924	Trinity (Boston)		
1925	New Park Rangers		
1926	Boston Town		
1927–1930	Grimsby Town	0	(0)
1930–1931	Swindon Town	14	(3)
1931–1932	Hull City	31	(7)
1932–1933	Swindon Town	31	(10)
1933–1934	Mansfield Town	29	(7)
1934–1939	Boston United		
1939	Redbourn Sports		
- * Club domestic league appearances and goals

Charles Edward Munnings (6 July 1906 – March 1995) was an English professional footballer who played in the Football League for Hull City, Mansfield Town and Swindon Town.
