= Steve Kilcar =

Scottish footballer

Personal information
- Place of birth: Bo'ness, Scotland
- Height: 5 ft 8 3/4 in (1.75 m)
- Position: Inside forward

Senior career*
| Years | Team | Apps | (Gls) |
- Linlithgow Rose
| | East Stirlingshire | 61 | (26) |
| 1929–1932 | Bradford Park Avenue | 27 | (9) |
| 1932–1933 | Coventry City | 4 | (0) |
| 1933–1935 | Mansfield Town | 31 | (14) |
| 1935 | Chester | 3 | (4) |
| 1935–1937 | Burnley | 24 | (7) |
| 1937 | Bournemouth & Boscombe | 6 | (0) |
| 1937 | Watford | 0 | (0) |
- * Club domestic league appearances and goals

Stephen P. Kilcar was a Scottish professional footballer who played as an inside forward. He played for several teams in the Football League during the 1930s, including Coventry City.
