= John Clayton (footballer, born 1907) =

English footballer

Personal information
- Full name: John Clayton
- Date of birth: 23 April 1907
- Place of birth: Mansfield, England
- Position: Wing half

Senior career*
Years	Team	Apps	(Gls)
1928–1929	Loughborough Corinthians		
1929–1930	Chesterfield	5	(0)
1930–1932	Wrexham	51	(1)
1932–1933	Carlisle United	24	(0)
1933–1934	Mansfield Town	15	(1)
1934	Grantham		
1935	Gainsborough Trinity		
- * Club domestic league appearances and goals

John Clayton (23 April 1907–unknown) was an English professional footballer who played in the Football League for Carlisle United, Chesterfield, Mansfield Town and Wrexham.
