= James Wilson (footballer, born 1884) =

Australian rules footballer

Personal information
- Full name: James Henry Wilson
- Born: 29 February 1884; Fitzroy, Victoria
- Died: 1 July 1934 (aged 50); Caulfield, Victoria
- Original team: Essendon District

Playing career^{1}
Years	Club	Games (Goals)
1906	Essendon	1 (0)
- ^{1} Playing statistics correct to the end of 1906.

James Henry Wilson (29 February 1884 – 1 July 1934) was an Australian rules footballer who played with Essendon in the Victorian Football League (VFL).
