= Jim Wilson (footballer, born 1945) =

Scottish footballer

Personal information
- Full name: James Wilson
- Date of birth: 6 August 1945 (age 81)
- Place of birth: Scotland
- Position: Full back

Senior career*
Years	Team	Apps	(Gls)
- Baillieston Juniors
1972–1973	Albion Rovers	18	(1)
1973	Queen's Park	2	(0)

International career
1973	Scotland Amateurs	4	(0)
- * Club domestic league appearances and goals

James Wilson (born 6 August 1945) is a Scottish retired amateur footballer who played as a full back in the Scottish League for Albion Rovers and Queen's Park. He was capped by Scotland at amateur level.
