= Charlie Williams (British writer) =

English writer (born 1971)

Charlie Williams (born 1971) is an English writer.

== Early life and education ==
Charlie Williams was born in 1971 in Worcester, England.

He attended Swansea University in Swansea, Wales.

== Books ==
Five of Williams' novels comprise The Mangel Series, published between 2004 and 2013. The protagonist is nightclub doorman Royston Blake and the novels are set in the fictional town of Mangel, which is based loosely on Worcester itself. Deadfolk was published in 2004, Fags and Lager in 2005, King of the Road in 2006, One Dead Hen in 2011 and Made of Stone in 2013. Comic, rural noir in the style of writers such as Jim Thompson, they use a colloquial first-person narrative throughout, in dialect, with Royston Blake as narrator. Thematically the novels explore dysfunctional masculinity and the decline and alienation of provincial Britain, and are littered with references to popular cultural icons of the seventies and eighties (Blake's, and Williams', formative period).

Previous to the success of the Mangel trilogy, Williams had attempted for some years to break into the horror genre.

Other notable works are the novel Stairway to Hell (2009), the novella Graven Image (2011), and the screenplay for the short film Ark.
