= Billy Death =

English footballer

William George Death (13 November 1900 – 3 July 1984) was an English professional footballer of the 1930s. Born in Rotherham, he joined Gillingham from Exeter City in 1930 and went on to make 27 appearances for the club in The Football League, scoring six goals. He left to join Mansfield Town in 1931.
