= James Wilson (footballer, born 1890) =

Scottish footballer

Personal information
- Full name: James Gilmour Wilson
- Date of birth: 19 November 1890
- Place of birth: Kilwinning, Scotland
- Date of death: 15 December 1917 (aged 27)
- Place of death: Flanders, Belgium
- Position: Left back

Senior career*
Years	Team	Apps	(Gls)
- Kilwinning Rangers
1914–1917	Queen's Park	42	(0)
- * Club domestic league appearances and goals

James Gilmour Wilson (19 November 1890 – 15 December 1917) was a Scottish amateur footballer who played as a left back in the Scottish League for Queen's Park.

== Personal life ==
Wilson attended Kilwinning Higher Grade School and Irvine Royal Academy and later worked as an accountant in Charing Cross. In September 1915, just over a year after Britain's entry into the First World War, Wilson enlisted in the Argyll and Sutherland Highlanders. He transferred to the Black Watch in September 1915 and saw action with the battalion on the Somme. In 1917, Wilson was commissioned as a second lieutenant in the Royal Scots Fusiliers and was killed by a sniper in Flanders on 15 December 1917. He is commemorated on the Menin Gate.

== Career statistics ==
Appearances and goals by club, season and competition
Club	Season	League			Other		Total	
Club	Season	Division	Apps	Goals	Apps	Goals	Apps	Goals
Queen's Park	1914–15	Scottish First Division	29	0	4 (Note: 2 appearances in Glasgow Cup, 1 appearance in Glasgow Merchants Charity Cup, 1 appearance in War Fund Shield)	0	33	0
Queen's Park	1915–16	Scottish First Division	12	0	1 (Note: Appearance in Glasgow Cup)	0	13	0
Queen's Park	1916–17	Scottish First Division	1	0	0	0	1	0
Career total			42	0	5	0	47	0
