= William Charles =

William Charles may refer to:

- William Charles (cartoonist) (1776–1820), Scottish-born engraver who immigrated to the United States
- William B. Charles (1861–1950), U.S. Representative from New York
- William Charles (fur trader) (1831–1903), Scottish-born fur trader who immigrated to Canada
- William Charles (wrestler) (born 1993), British professional wrestler
- William Charles (judge) (born 1948), judge of the High Court of England and Wales
