= Thomas Small =

English footballer

Personal information
- Full name: Thomas Small
- Date of birth: 2 September 1907
- Place of birth: Scarborough, England
- Date of death: 1993 (aged 85–86)
- Position: Winger

Senior career*
Years	Team	Apps	(Gls)
1929	Scarborough		
1930–1931	Aston Villa	0	(0)
1931–1932	Mansfield Town	2	(0)
1933	Scarborough		
Total		2	(0)
- * Club domestic league appearances and goals

Thomas Small (2 September 1907 – 1993) was an English professional footballer who played in the Football League for Mansfield Town.
