= Clifford Herring =

English footballer

Personal information
- Full name: Clifford Herring
- Date of birth: 13 October 1913
- Place of birth: Chesterfield, England
- Date of death: 1997 (aged 83–84)
- Position: Wing half

Senior career*
Years	Team	Apps	(Gls)
1932–1933	Mansfield Town	2	(0)
1933	Ollerton Colliery		
- * Club domestic league appearances and goals

Clifford Herring (13 October 1913 – 1997) was an English footballer who played in the Football League for Mansfield Town.
