= Harry Keeling (cricketer) =

English cricketer

Harry Walter Keeling (8 November 1873 – 19 February 1898) was an English cricketer. He played two first-class cricket matches for Kent County Cricket Club in 1893.

Keeling was the son of a curate and was born at Hove in Sussex, one of eight children. He was educated at Hurstpierpoint College. He played cricket for his school and club cricket for Plaistow and Bickley Park Cricket Clubs. Both of his first-class matches were against Gloucestershire in the 1893 County Championship.

Keeling worked as a stockbroker in London. He died from lung cancer at Marylebone in London in February 1898 aged 24.

== Bibliography ==
- Carlaw, Derek (2020). Kent County Cricketers, A to Z: Part One (1806–1914) (PDF). Cardiff: ACS.
