= James Arthur Wilson =

British physician

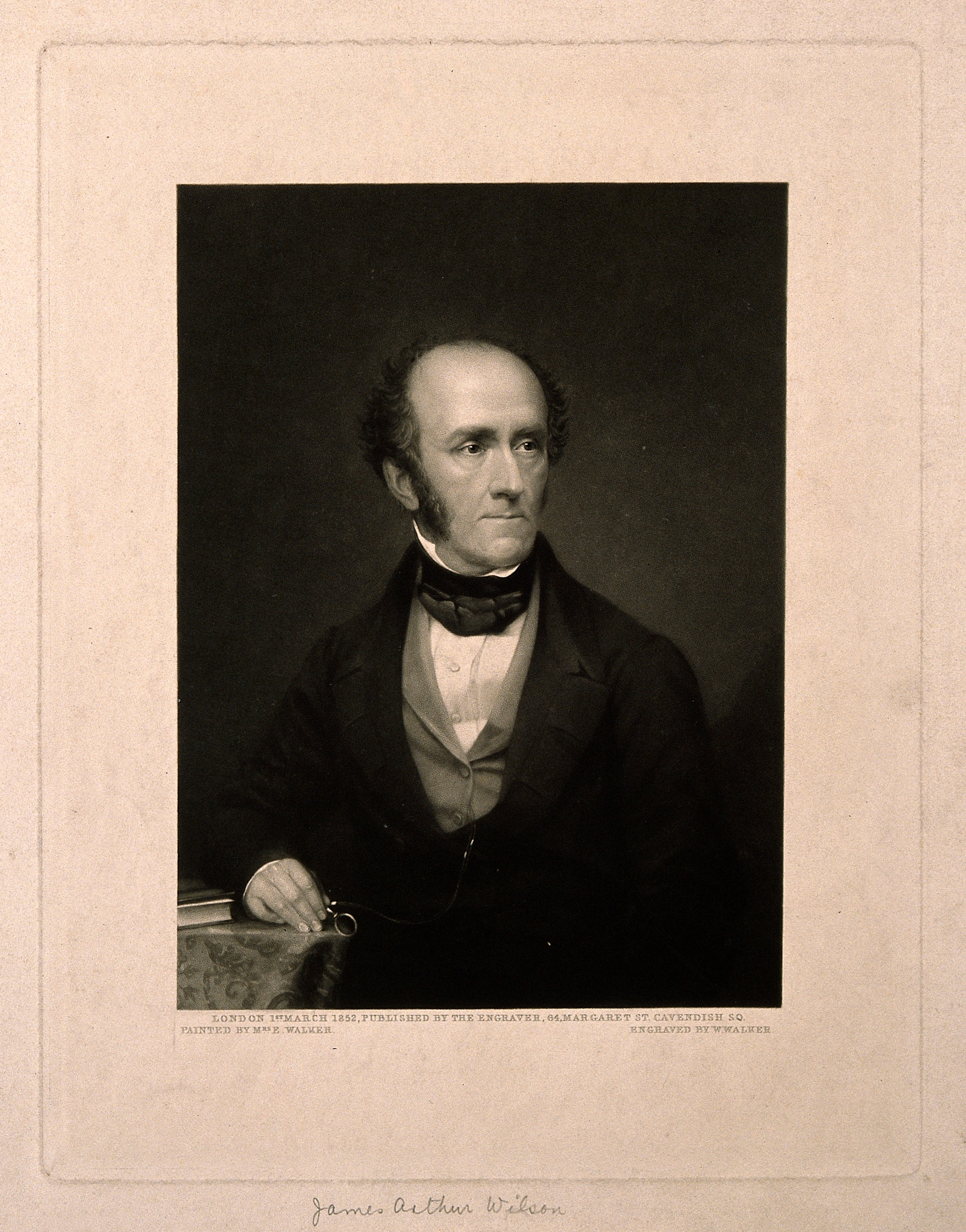
Mezzotint portrait. Wellcome library.

Dr James Arthur Wilson FRCP (1795 – 29 December 1882) was a British physician.

He was born in Lincoln's Inn Fields, London, the son of James Wilson, the surgeon and teacher of anatomy at the Hunterian School of Medicine in Great Windmill Street, London. He was educated at Westminster School from 1808, and entered Christ Church, Oxford on 9 May 1812, from where he graduated with a BA in 1815. He left Oxford temporarily and entered his father's school in Great Windmill Street and the University of Edinburgh in the winter of 1817. He was awarded an MA from Oxford in 1818, an MB in 1819 and an MD in 1823.

He was elected a Radcliffe travelling fellow in June 1821 and spent the next five years in Europe in compliance with the requirements of the fellowship.

He became a Fellow of the College of Physicians in 1825, and was censor in 1828 and 1851. He delivered the Materia Medica Lectures at the College from 1829 to 1832, the Lumleian Lectures in 1847 and 1848 ‘on Pain,’ and the Harveian Oration in 1850. He was elected physician to St George's Hospital on 29 May 1829, and held the office until 1857, when he was appointed consulting physician.

Wilson died in Holmwood, Surrey, in 1882.

== Published works ==
- On Spasm, Languor, Palsy, and other disorders termed Nervous, of the Muscular System. 8vo. Lond. 1843.
- Oratio Harveiana in Ædibus Collegii Medicorum habita die Junii xxix, mdcccl. 8vo. Lond. 1850.
