= Alan Livingstone =

Scottish footballer

Personal information
- Full name: Alan McKenzie Livingstone
- Date of birth: 2 December 1899
- Place of birth: Alexandria, West Dunbartonshire, Scotland
- Date of death: 1970 (aged 70–71)
- Height: 5 ft 7 in (1.70 m)
- Position: Inside forward

Senior career*
Years	Team	Apps	(Gls)
1919	Vale United		
1920–1921	Everton	0	(0)
1921	Dumbarton Harp		
1922–1923	Hull City	1	(0)
1923	Scunthorpe & Lindsey United		
1924–1925	Hartlepools United	3	(1)
1925–1926	Crewe Alexandra	0	(0)
1926	New Brighton	6	(1)
1926–1927	Clapton Orient	1	(0)
1927–1928	Merthyr Town	27	(3)
1928–1929	Swansea Town	0	(0)
1929	Ayr United		
1930–1931	Chelsea		
1930	Armadale		
1931	East Fife		
1931	Walsall	1	(0)
1931	Oswestry Town		
1931	Colwyn Bay United		
1932	Chester		
1932	Colwyn Bay United		
1932	Dumbarton		
1932	Ayr United		
1933–1934	Mansfield Town	43	(1)
1934–1935	Stockport County	0	(0)
- * Club domestic league appearances and goals

Alan McKenzie Livingstone (2 September 1907 – 1970) was a Scottish professional footballer who played in the Football League for Clapton Orient, Hartlepools United, Hull City, Mansfield Town, Merthyr Town, New Brighton and Walsall.
