= James Wilson (anatomist) =

British anatomist

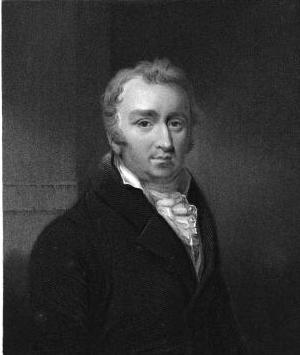
James Wilson, engraving from Thomas Joseph Pettigrew, Medical Portrait Gallery (1838).

Dr James Wilson (1765–1821) was a British anatomist. A pupil of John Hunter, he took over Hunter's position teaching anatomy at the Great Windmill Street School in London, and was elected a Fellow of the Royal Society. He is eponym of Wilson's muscle in the constrictor urethræ. His anatomical collection was donated to the Surgeon's Hall in Edinburgh and it is now known as the James Wilson Collection.

== Life ==
He was born in Beith, Ayrshire.

His family moved to London in his youth, and he then became assistant to Dr William Cumberland Cruikshank: he made dissections for Cruikshank and John Hunter. He also studied under William Hunter and Matthew Baillie. He then became a demonstrator and lecturer on anatomy; and was licensed to teach classes in surgery; he attracted naval and military men, and James McGrigor was among his pupils. His private lectures were then taken over by Benjamin Brodie, and Wilson concentrated on the Great Windmill Street School.

== Family ==
Wilson married the sister of John Clarke. The physician James Arthur Wilson was their son.

== See also ==
Truncus arteriosus
