= William Featherby =

English cricketer

William Dixon Featherby (18 August 1888 – 20 November 1958) was an English first-class cricketer, who played two matches for Yorkshire County Cricket Club in 1920.

Yorkshire beat Derbyshire by an innings in his first match, in which he bowled four overs of off breaks, conceding 12 runs. He did not bat or bowl in the subsequent innings victory over Worcestershire. This concluded his first-class career, although he was invited to play for Yorkshire again against Middlesex, but declined due to work on his family's farm at Goodmanham, East Riding of Yorkshire, where he was born.

It was a decision he regretted all his life, as he was never selected for Yorkshire again. He did, however, represent Yorkshire in a number of other games, including a match against a York sixteen in which he and Wilfred Rhodes opened the batting, and also games against Dinnington and District and York and District in 1920, scoring 24 and 7 respectively.

In 1919, he had appeared for the 'East Riding' against the Yorkshire Second XI, scoring seven runs batting at number 3. He had started his club cricket career with Londesborough Park in 1909, and in 1911 joined Beverley Town Cricket Club, which remained his main club for the rest of his career. In his first season with Beverley, he took 16 wickets for 115 runs in three matches.

He captained Beverley Town all through the 1930s, and played occasional games in his late 60s while also coaching at Pocklington School.

Featherby died at Goodmanham Lodge, in November 1958. His distinctive gravestone, with its rifle and cricket bat, is at All Saints Church, Goodmanham.
