= Charles Williams (footballer, born 1912) =

English footballer

Personal information
- Full name: Charles Williams
- Date of birth: 1910
- Place of birth: Clowne, England
- Position: Goalkeeper

Senior career*
Years	Team	Apps	(Gls)
1931–1932	Clowne Miners Welfare		
1932–1933	Shirebrook		
1933–1934	Mansfield Town	22	(0)
1934	Rhyl Athletic		
- * Club domestic league appearances and goals

Charles Williams (1912 – after 1933) was an English professional footballer who played in the Football League for Mansfield Town.
