= Jim Richard Wilson =

American art curator (1953–2014)

- Born: February 18, 1953; United States
- Died: July 13, 2014; Albany, New York, U.S.
- Occupations: Artist, history lecturer, gallery director

Jim Richard Wilson (February 18, 1953 – July 13, 2014) was an American art curator who was the founding director of the Opalka Gallery. He served as gallery director and art history lecturer for The Sage Colleges for over 20 years (1992–2013). Previously, he was with the State University of New York as assistant director of university-wide Programs in the Arts (1989–1992). He has been consultant to and lectured for numerous arts organizations and museums and was Director of the Peter S. Loonam Gallery in Bridgehampton, New York, for ten years (1976–1986) prior to relocating to the Capital District of New York State. Wilson has been curating shows and writing on art since 1975. He has earned and maintained a reputation for mounting museum quality shows.

Wilson was an artist whose art work has appeared in more than a hundred exhibitions nationwide, including over a dozen solo and small group (2–4 artists) shows. His work is in numerous collections including: The State University at Stony Brook, PepsiCo, International Specialties Inc., Mariposa Luminosa, and ArtPool, Budapest.

The most recent article discussing Wilson's exhibition history appeared on April 20, 2014, in the Sunday edition of the Daily Gazette. He died of cancer on July 13, 2014.

== Exhibitions ==
Wilson is best known for his work on post World War II American Art and Jewish history. Among the exhibitions for which he has been responsible are:

- Dona Ann McAdams: Some Women (2009) the first career overview of the work of this street photographer who has been the recipient of the Dorothea Lange/Paul Taylor Award from the Center for Documentary Studies at Duke University, Bessie and Obie Awards. Her work on performance art was the subject of an Aperture monograph, Caught in the Act. The exhibition included over three dozen works, 35 of which were reproduced in the catalogue. Among the texts in the catalog were essays by Eleanor Heartney, Fabienne Waring, and Wilson.
- New York School: Another View (2005) a re-examination of Abstract Expressionism displaying the diversity and asserting the importance of the community out of which this seminal American art movement emerged. Thirty-eight artworks by as many artists were borrowed from 19 public and private collections for the exhibition. The catalogue for the exhibit included essays by Terence Diggory, Ann Eden Gibson, Esther Tornai Thyssen, as well as Wilson. The following artists works were represented in this show: Peter Agostini, Charles Alston, Nell Blaine, Norman Bluhm, Seymour Boardman, Ernest Briggs, James Brooks, Herman Cherry, Nassos Daphnis, Dorothy Dehner, Beauford Delaney, Jimmy Ernst, Herbert Ferber, John Ferren, Perle Fine, Helen Frankenthaler, Michael Goldberg, Raoul Hague, Grace Hartigan, Lee Krasner, Buffie Johnson, Ibram Lassaw, Helen Levitt, Norman Lewis, Conrad Marca-Relli, Mercedes Matter, Joan Mitchell, Louise Nevelson, Ray Parker, Robert Richenburg, Judith Rothschild, Jack Tworkov, Yvonne Thomas, Charmion von Wiegand and Wilfrid Zogbaum. This group included three African-American artists, Alston, Delaney and Lewis, who were excluded from early shows of the New York School painters and sculptors through the early 1960s due to segregationist attitudes.
- An American Shtetl: Jewish History and Community in Troy, New York (2001) an in-depth multifaceted exploration and narrative of a particularly significant Jewish community from the mid-19th into the 21st centuries. This was the first attempt to organize and make available and document the history and centrality of the Jewish community to the prosperity of Troy, a which played a crucial role in the industrial and educational development of the United States.
- A Place by the Sea (1999), including the work of 4 African American abstract artists associated with the Eastville community in Sag Harbor, New York. The exhibit included work by Nanette Carter, Gregory Coates, Alvin Loving, and Frank Wimberley. First mounted at The Sage Colleges in Albany, New York, the exhibit traveled to Christiane Nienaber Contemporary Art in NYC and Arlene Bujese Gallery in East Hampton, New York.
- Llave: A Key to the Secret (1996) on Sephardic history and experience in the New World. This project on the history and culture of Spanish Jews in the Western Hemisphere built on years of research and included presentations by Nan Rubin, project director of The Hidden Jews of New Mexico, Flory Jagoda, noted Sephardic songwriter and singer, Isabelle Medina Sandoval, poet, Robert Michael Esformes, cantor and musician, among others. The publication created for this project was requested by the Library of Congress. The information gathered by Llave served as a resource for University of Almeiria's Sephardic Studies Center among others.
- Val Telberg & Anaïs Nin: House of Incest (1994) which was first mounted at The Sage Colleges in Albany, New York, and traveled to Southampton College of Long Island University as a centerpiece of the first scholarly conference on Anaïs Nin in 1994. The exhibit was later installed at and then traveled nationally by Visual Studies Workshop in Rochester, New York.

== Published writing ==
Among his writings on art and culture are:

- Dona Ann McAdams: Some Women
- George Hofmann: Inner Life Articulated
- Cool Katz, Chronogram (Delmar, New York) July 2007 issue
- New York School: Another View
- Frank Wimberly: Wimberley's Mode
- Bridging the Gaps; The Nature and Responsibility of Visual Arts Writing
- A Place by the Sea: Major African-American Artists from the East End
- "Cuneiform Currency" (included in Toward A Second Dimension: A Sociology Reader, ed. McGuire & Purtusati, Kendal/Hunt Publishers, Dubuque, Iowa, 1998).
- Willie Marlowe: A Survey 1977–2010

Jim Richard Wilson's knowledge has been noted and appreciated by fellow arts professionals outside of the above journals.
