= David Prentice (footballer) =

Scottish footballer

Personal information
- Full name: David Prentice
- Date of birth: 29 July 1908
- Place of birth: Alloa, Scotland
- Date of death: 10 November 1984
- Position: Inside forward

Senior career*
Years	Team	Apps	(Gls)
1927–1928	Alva Albion Rangers		
1928–1930	Celtic	6	(1)
1928	→ Stranraer (loan)		
1929	→ Ayr United (loan)		
1929	→ Nithsdale Wanderers (loan)		
1930–1931	Plymouth Argyle	0	(0)
1931–1932	Walsall	23	(4)
1932–1933	Bournemouth and Boscombe Athletic	0	(0)
1933	Raith Rovers		
1933–1934	Mansfield Town	19	(1)
1934	Bath City		
1935	Trowbridge Town		
- * Club domestic league appearances and goals

David Prentice (29 July 1908 – 10 November 1984) was a Scottish professional footballer who played in the Football League for Mansfield Town and Walsall.
