= Walter Hoyland =

English footballer

Personal information
- Full name: Walter Hoyland
- Date of birth: 14 August 1901
- Place of birth: Sheffield, England
- Date of death: 1985 (aged 83–84)
- Height: 5 ft 9 in (1.75 m)
- Position: Inside forward

Senior career*
Years	Team	Apps	(Gls)
1921–1926	Sheffield United	24	(4)
1926–1928	Fulham	22	(4)
1928–1930	Boston Town		
1930–1931	Loughborough Corinthians		
1931–1932	Peterborough & Fletton United		
1932–1933	Mansfield Town	25	(9)
1933	Spalding United		
1934	Seymour Cobley		
- * Club domestic league appearances and goals

Walter Hoyland (14 August 1901 – 1985) was an English professional footballer who played in the Football League for Fulham, Mansfield Town and Sheffield United.
