= Harold Methven =

English footballer

Personal information
- Full name: Harold Methven
- Date of birth: 9 October 1908
- Place of birth: Derby, England
- Date of death: 1987 (aged 78–79)
- Position: Centre forward

Senior career*
Years	Team	Apps	(Gls)
1928	Derby Municipal		
1929	Gresley Rovers		
1930–1931	Portsmouth	2	(0)
1931	Sheffield United	0	(0)
1931	Scunthorpe & Lindsey United		
1932	Loughborough Corinthians		
1933–1934	Mansfield Town	10	(9)
1934	Tunbridge Wells Rangers		
- * Club domestic league appearances and goals

Harold Methven (9 October 1908 – 1987) was an English professional footballer who played in the Football League for Mansfield Town and Portsmouth.
