= Frank Rayner =

English footballer

Personal information
- Full name: Frank Walter Rayner
- Place of birth: Goldthorpe, England
- Height: 5 ft 7 1/2 in (1.71 m)
- Position: Wing half

Senior career*
Years	Team	Apps	(Gls)
1930–1931	Charlton Athletic	0	(0)
1931–1932	Barnsley	0	(0)
1932–1933	Rotherham United	0	(0)
1933–1934	Mansfield Town	17	(8)
1934–1939	Burnley	79	(7)
1939	Notts County	2	(0)
- * Club domestic league appearances and goals

Frank Walter Rayner was an English professional footballer who played as a wing half. He played almost 100 games in the Football League before his career was cut short by the Second World War.
