= Jack Prior =

English footballer

Personal information
- Date of birth: 2 July 1904
- Place of birth: Choppington, England
- Date of death: 1982 (aged 77–78)
- Place of death: Newton Abbot, Devon
- Height: 5 ft 9 in (1.75 m)
- Position: Winger

Senior career*
Years	Team	Apps	(Gls)
1921–1922	Choppington Colliery		
1922–1923	Blyth Spartans		
1923–1927	Sunderland	67	(10)
1927–1932	Grimsby Town	160	(34)
1932	Ashington		
1932–1933	Mansfield Town	32	(7)
1933–1934	Stalybridge Celtic		
1934–193?	Pressed Steel		
- * Club domestic league appearances and goals

Jack Prior (2 July 1904 – 1982) was an English professional footballer who played as a winger.
