= George Bowater =

English footballer (1911–1966)

Personal information
- Full name: George Albert Bowater
- Date of birth: 26 October 1911
- Place of birth: Shirebrook, Derbyshire, England
- Date of death: 1966 (aged 54 or 55)
- Height: 5 ft 8 in (1.73 m)
- Position: Outside forward

Senior career*
Years	Team	Apps	(Gls)
1929–1931	Shirebrook		
1931–1933	Mansfield Town	60	(28)
1933–1934	Bradford Park Avenue	6	(1)
1934–1935	York City	30	(11)
1935–	Burton Town		
- Frickley Colliery
1937-1939	Peterborough United	79	(24)
Total		96	(40)
- * Club domestic league appearances and goals

George Albert Bowater (26 October 1911 – 1966) was an English professional footballer who played as an outside forward in the Football League for Mansfield Town, Bradford Park Avenue and York City and in non-League football for Shirebrook, Burton Town, Frickley Colliery and Peterborough United.
