= Arthur Staples =

English cricketer

Personal information
- Full name: Arthur Staples
- Date of birth: 4 February 1899
- Place of birth: Newstead, Nottinghamshire, England
- Date of death: 9 September 1965
- Place of death: Redhill, Nottinghamshire, England
- Position: Goalkeeper

Senior career*
Years	Team	Apps	(Gls)
- Newstead
1927	Notts County	0	(0)
- Newark Town
- Mansfield Town
1930	Bournemouth	0	(0)
1931–1932	Mansfield Town	13	(0)
- Ilkeston Town
- * Club domestic league appearances and goals

Arthur Staples (4 February 1899 – 9 September 1965) was an English first-class cricketer active 1924–38 who played for Nottinghamshire. He was born in Newstead, Nottinghamshire and died in Redhill, Nottinghamshire. He played in 358 first-class matches as a right-handed batsman, scoring 12,762 runs with a highest score of 153*; and as a right-arm medium pace bowler, taking 635 wickets with a best performance of seven for 20. He was awarded his county cap in 1926 and a benefit season in 1937. Staples played football in the Football League as a goalkeeper for Mansfield Town and Notts County.
