= Eli Sivister =

English footballer (1911–1993)

Personal information
- Full name: Elijah Sivister
- Date of birth: 11 December 1911
- Place of birth: Clowne, England
- Date of death: 1993 (aged 81–82)
- Position: Wing half

Senior career*
Years	Team	Apps	(Gls)
1930	Langwith Colliery		
1931	Shirebrook		
1932–1934	Mansfield Town	2	(0)
1934	Ollerton Colliery		
1935	Ripley Town		
1936	Ilkeston United		
1937	Sutton Town		
1938	Creswell Colliery		
- * Club domestic league appearances and goals

Elijah Sivister (11 December 1911 – 1993) was an English professional footballer who played in the Football League for Mansfield Town.
