= Jimmy Jepson =

English footballer

Personal information
- Full name: John James Jepson
- Date of birth: 19 August 1899
- Place of birth: Heaton Norris, England
- Date of death: 1987 (aged 87–88)
- Position: Forward

Senior career*
Years	Team	Apps	(Gls)
1924–1925	Notts County	0	(0)
1925–1927	Accrington Stanley	56	(41)
1927–1928	Carlisle United		
1928–1930	Accrington Stanley	51	(41)
1930–1931	Wigan Borough	35	(28)
1931–1932	Mansfield Town	1	(0)
- * Club domestic league appearances and goals

John James Jepson (born 19 August 1899; died 1987) was an English footballer who played as a forward for Notts County, Accrington Stanley, Carlisle United, Wigan Borough and Mansfield Town.
