= Reg Cropper =

English footballer

Personal information
- Full name: Reginald Cropper
- Date of birth: 21 January 1902
- Place of birth: Brimington, England
- Date of death: 1942 (aged 39–40)
- Position: Inside forward

Senior career*
Years	Team	Apps	(Gls)
1924	Staveley Town		
1924–1925	Watford	0	(0)
1925–1926	Notts County	0	(0)
1926–1928	Norwich City	49	(16)
1928–1929	Guildford City		
1929–1930	Tranmere Rovers	18	(4)
1930–1931	FC Sochaux-Montbéliard	15	(14)
1930–1931	Guildford City		
1931–1932	Crystal Palace	3	(1)
1932–1933	Mansfield Town	6	(1)
1933	Hollingwood Rangers		
- * Club domestic league appearances and goals

Reginald Cropper (21 January 1902 – 1942) was an English professional footballer who played in the Football League for Crystal Palace, Mansfield Town, Norwich City and Tranmere Rovers.
