= Bernard Chambers =

English footballer (1903–1936)

Personal information
- Date of birth: 1903
- Place of birth: Bramcote, England
- Date of death: 1936 (aged 32–33)
- Position: Defender

Senior career*
Years	Team	Apps	(Gls)
- Langwith Athletic
- New Stubbin Colliery
- Worksop Colliery
1924	Nottingham Forest	0	(0)
1925	Shirebrook		
1926–1927	Rotherham United	34	(0)
1928–1931	Boston Town		
1931–1932	Mansfield Town	10	(0)
- * Club domestic league appearances and goals

Bernard Chambers (1903–1936) was an English footballer who played in the Football League for Mansfield Town and Rotherham United.
