= James Wilson (philosopher) =

British philosopher

Education
- Education: University of Bristol (BA), University of London (PhD)

Philosophical work
- Era: 21st-century philosophy
- Region: Western philosophy
- Institutions: University College London
- Main interests: applied ethics

James G.S. Wilson is a British philosopher and Professor of Philosophy at University College London. He is known for his works on public health ethics. He is an associate editor of the journal Mind.

== Books ==
- Philosophy for Public Health & Policy: Beyond the Neglectful State. Oxford University Press 2021
