= Coifi =

7th century Northumbrian priest

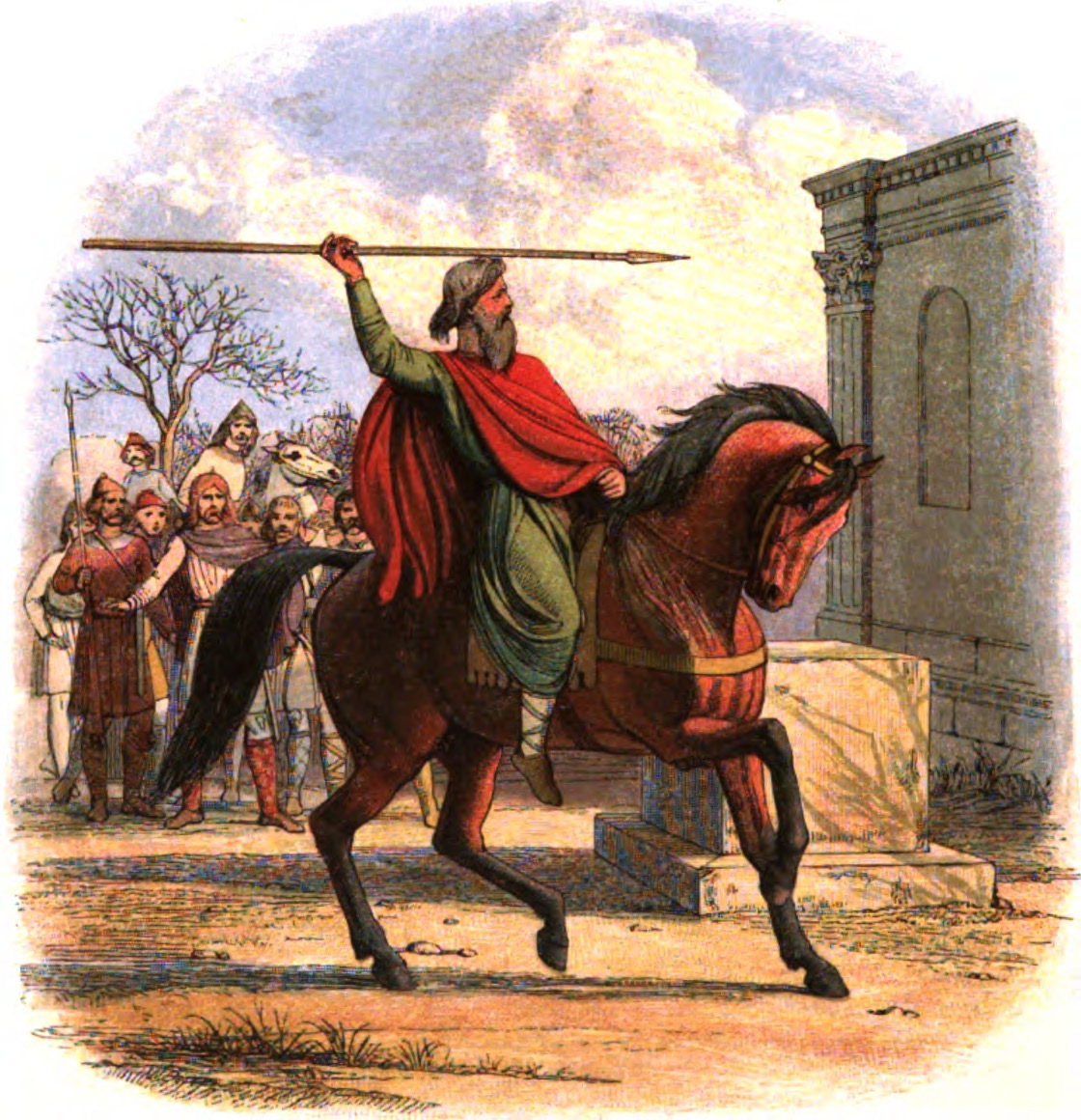
"The High Priest Coifi Profanes the Temple of the Idols", from James William Edmund Doyle's A Chronicle of England (1864).

Coifi is a priest recorded by Bede in the Ecclesiastical History of the English People as having presided over the temple at Goodmanham in the Northumbria in 627. He occurs in a story relating to the conversion of the Northumbrian elites in the court of Eadwine of Deira, in which he renounces Anglo-Saxon paganism in favour of Christianity, before leading a group to destroy and burn down the temple over which he had presided.

The historical reliablility of the account has been doubted by scholars, who have noted that while some imagery does show similarities with motifs from Germanic religion and mythology, Bede's description likely draws heavily from existing Christian tradition and likely does not accurately represent how the events transpired.

== Overview of Bede's account ==
In the Ecclesiastical History of the English People Bede describes the circumstances around the conversion of King Eadwine of Deira. Before agreeing to be baptised, Bede records that the king discussed the matter with his leading men, including the primus pontificum ("chief priest") Coifi. Coifi explains in a speech that he believes that worshipping the gods of the traditional religion is pointless, basing this on the fact that while he worships them more than anyone, others receive more gifts and honours than him. He explains that if the gods had power, they would help him and he urges the group present to convert as soon as possible.

Following this first speech, another man present supports Coifi, using the metaphor that life is like a sparrow flying through a warm hall in winter, having a brief respite before travelling out again into the storm outside again. He argues that Christianity provides more certainty of before and after one's life and should thus be followed. The Christian god then spurs the others there to speak in agreement.

Coifi then speaks again asking to learn more of Christianity from Paulinus, which leads him expressing his lack of belief in the heathen gods. admitting that he has felt this way for a long time. The priest then advises the king that they ban and burn down the temples and altars that he had hallowed without receiving any benefit. Bede writes that he then broke the religious taboos of his priesthood by arming himself and getting up on a male horse that Eadwine provided him before riding to the temple at Goodmanham. Both the weapons and the horse were provided by the king. The crowd who saw him riding there thought he was mad and as soon as he gets there, God inspires him to desecrate the temple. He does by casting a spear at it, and has it torn down and set fire to by his companions while Coifi rejoices in the knowledge that he is now worshipping the true god. In Alcuin's retelling of the story, he writes that Eadwine ordered Coifi to profane the shrine.

== Name ==
The name Coifi is very rare in Anglo-Saxon sources, occurring only in the Ecclesiastical History of the English People in the narrative about the Northumbrian priest and in accounts derived from it such as Alcuin's retelling, in which the form Coefi is used, and the Old English version of the Ecclesiastical History of the English People, in which the form Cefi is used. Furthermore, the name Ceefi is recorded in a list of monks in the early 9th century core of the Durham Liber Vitae which is probably related to Coifi, however the origins of all of these names are unclear.

It has been suggested that Bede could have either exploited an existing tradition, or actively chosen the name, so as to draw links with the name Caiaphas, referred to in the Vulgate version of the Gospel of John as a pontifex, the same term Bede uses for Coifi.

== Historicity and interpretation ==
The historicity of Bede's account has been questioned by scholars with it being noted that the account closely resembles other Christian works such as the Prose Life of Cuthbert, with it being argued that the account is not an accurate depiction of the events surrounding the Christianisation of Northumbria, but instead a work of literary inversion and biblical exegesis reflecting on the Redemption.

One description that it closely parallels is that of Clovis I's baptism in the writings of Gregory of Tours. Whilst this account has no high priest, Clovis' wife Clothildis is given very similar words to speak by Gregory as Coifi is given by Bede; she insists to the king that he is to stop worshipping worthless gods made of materials such as stone and wood. Clovis realises the pointlessness of his former practices and promises to convert when he is losing a battle against the Alamans if God gives him victory. After winning, he speaks with his people who spontaneously reject their gods that Gregory labels as mortal and agreed to be baptised by St Remigius who urged them to burn what they had formerly worshipped as he baptised them.

It has been suggested that whilst Coifi's speech sounds like Bede's own words put into the priest's mouth, he could have heard the tale directly from someone who witnessed it. The probability of this has been doubted, however, with it being suggested that it is more likely that Bede was using a well-known topos that may have been borrowed from Gregory of Tours. It has been suggested that Bede was trying to put forward a likely turn of events given that Eadwine did convert and assuming that a high priest was present.

Based on comparisons with Old Nordic religion, the existence of a heathen priesthood has been doubted, leading to further questioning of the accuracy of the account. Coifi's role in the narrative closely resembles that of priests in Northumbria after the adoption of Christianity and while taboos against the carrying of weapons and the riding of stallions are attested in Germanic contexts in certain situations, the two taboos also were applied to Christian priests. It has thus been argued that the role of Coifi in the tale is very unlikely to reflect the reality of the situation or the wider institutional structure of Anglo-Saxon paganism.

The account further closely resembles Biblical traditions, with the speech made by one of Eadwine's companions about the sparrow flying through the hall echoing Psalm 84, which was one of Bede's favourite Psalms. The usage of the word lancea ("spear") for the weapon Coifi throws at the shrine, instead of the more common word hasta, may have been in reference to the Vulgate version of the Gospel of John, in which the word lancea is used for the spear that pierces Christ's side. Bede may thus have depicted Coifi piercing the heathen shrine as an inversion of the piercing of the temple that is Christ's body, leading to an outflowing of the blood of the eucharist and the water of baptism. Coifi's actions could have been presented to symbolise opening the Northumbrians up to the possibility of conversion to Christianity and salvation.

Some elements of the account are likely historically accurate, however, such as the names of Goodmanham and Coifi. The description of the temple at Goodmanham as consisting of temples and altars surrounded by fences or hedges has also been considered as possible evidence regarding heathen religious enclosures. The temple has also been examined in light of excavations of possible religious structures such as that at Yeavering and in Scandinavia, and written accounts such as that of the temple at Uppsala, with common shared features being identified including them being made of wood, containing altars and being nearby enclosures.

A further theory put forward by Richard North is that Paulinus disguised as Woden acted under the alias of Coifi and profaned the shrine in a desperate effort to stop Eadwine celebrating fertility rites during Lent that would have led him to break his fast.

== Sources ==
Bede's account on Eadwine's conversion has been proposed to have been principally based on two sources: a tradition from Whitby where Eadwine was buried that is found in the Earliest Life of Gregory the Great, and a tradition based in Canterbury that possibly originated from Paulinus who fled there after the death of Eadwine at the hands of Cadwallon ap Cadfan and Penda in 633.

== See also ==
- Christianity in Anglo-Saxon England
- Christianisation of the Germanic peoples
- Christianisation of Scandinavia
- Olaf Tryggvason, a king who led the destruction of heathen holy places in Norway
- Religion in the United Kingdom

== Bibliography ==
=== Primary ===
- Sellar (1907). Bede's Ecclesiastical History of England - Christian Classics Ethereal Library. London: George Bell and Sons.

=== Secondary ===
- Barrow, Julia (October 2011). "How Coifi Pierced Christ's Side: A Re-Examination of Bede's Ecclesiastical History, II, Chapter 13". The Journal of Ecclesiastical History. 62 (4): 693–706. doi:10.1017/S0022046911001631. ISSN 1469-7637.
- Church, S. D. (April 2008). "Paganism in Conversion-Age Anglo-Saxon England: The Evidence of Bede's Ecclesiastical History Reconsidered". History. 93 (310): 162–180. doi:10.1111/j.1468-229X.2008.00420.x.
- Orton, Peter (2005). "'Burning Idols, Burning Bridges: Bede, Conversion and Beowulf" (PDF). Leeds Studies in English. 5 (46).
- Reed, Michael (1997). "Norwegian Stave Churches and their Pagan Antecedents". RACAR: Revue d'art canadienne / Canadian Art Review. 24 (2): 3–13. doi:10.7202/1071663ar. ISSN 0315-9906.
- Semple, Sarah (2010). "Chapter 2, In the Open Air". Signals of Belief in Early England: Anglo-Saxon Paganism Revisited. Oxbow Books. ISBN 978-1-84217-395-4. JSTOR j.ctt1cd0nf9.8.
