= Charles Anthoney =

English footballer

Personal information
- Full name: Charles Anthoney
- Date of birth: 15 April 1902
- Place of birth: Mansfield, England
- Date of death: 1982 (aged 79–80)
- Position: Defender

Senior career*
Years	Team	Apps	(Gls)
1928–1929	Mansfield Town		
1929–1932	Northampton Town	81	(0)
1932–1933	Mansfield Town	39	(2)
- * Club domestic league appearances and goals

Charles Anthoney (15 April 1902 – 1982) was an English professional footballer who played Football League for Mansfield Town and Northampton Town.
