= James Wilson (Dean of Tuam) =

James Wilson was an Irish Anglican clergyman.

Wilson was vicar general of the Diocese of Elphin and also its archdeacon from 1665 until 1688. He was provost of Tuam from 1667 to 1669, when he was appointed dean of its cathedral.
