= Ben Wonnacott =

English footballer

Personal information
- Full name: Clarence Benjamin Wonnacott
- Date of birth: 31 December 1909
- Place of birth: Clowne, England
- Date of death: 1993 (aged 88–89)
- Position: Inside forward

Senior career*
Years	Team	Apps	(Gls)
1928–1929	Clipstone Colliery Welfare		
1929–1930	Mansfield Town		
1930–1931	Northampton Town	13	(4)
1931–1932	Shelbourne		
1932–1933	Mansfield Town	15	(2)
1934	Calais Racing Union Football Club		
1934	Kidderminster Harriers		

International career
1932	League of Ireland XI	1	(1)
- * Club domestic league appearances and goals

Clarence Benjamin Wonnacott (31 December 1909 – 1989) was an English professional footballer who played in the Football League for Mansfield Town and Northampton Town.
