= James Wilson (1910s footballer) =

English footballer

Personal information
- Full name: James Henry Wilson
- Place of birth: Newcastle upon Tyne, England
- Height: 5 ft 9 in (1.75 m)
- Position: Goalkeeper

Senior career*
Years	Team	Apps	(Gls)
- Newcastle Bentonians
1911–1914	Newcastle United	3	(0)
- North Shields Athletic
- * Club domestic league appearances and goals

James Henry Wilson was an English professional footballer who played in the Football League for Newcastle United as a goalkeeper.

== Personal life ==
Wilson served as a gunner in the Royal Garrison Artillery during the First World War.

== Career statistics ==
Appearances and goals by club, season and competition
Club	Season	League			FA Cup		Total	
Club	Season	Division	Apps	Goals	Apps	Goals	Apps	Goals
Newcastle United	1912–13	First Division	2	0	0	0	2	0
Newcastle United	1913–14	First Division	1	0	1	0	2	0
Career total			3	0	1	0	4	0
