= Joe Edwards (footballer, born 1907) =

English footballer

Personal information
- Full name: Joseph Arthur Edwards
- Date of birth: 2 September 1907
- Place of birth: Scarcliffe, England
- Date of death: 1997 (aged 89–90)
- Position: Goalkeeper

Senior career*
Years	Team	Apps	(Gls)
1928–1929	Bolsover Town		
1929–1930	Staveley Town		
1930–1931	Chesterfield	0	(0)
1931–1932	Derby County	0	(0)
1932–1933	Bolsover Colliery		
1933–1934	Mansfield Town	20	(0)
1934	Ollerton Colliery		
- * Club domestic league appearances and goals

Joseph Arthur Edwards (5 March 1907 – 1997) was an English professional footballer who played in the Football League for Mansfield Town.
