= Harold Hill (footballer) =

English footballer

Personal information
- Full name: Harold Hill
- Date of birth: 24 September 1899
- Place of birth: Blackwell, Bolsover, England
- Date of death: 1969 (aged 69–70)
- Height: 5 ft 5 in (1.65 m)
- Position: Inside forward

Senior career*
Years	Team	Apps	(Gls)
1914–1918	Birdholme Rovers		
1918–1919	New Hucknall Colliery		
1919–1925	Notts County	151	(50)
1924–1929	The Wednesday	91	(37)
1929–1932	Scarborough		
1932–1933	Chesterfield	11	(2)
1933–1934	Mansfield Town	22	(5)
1934	Sutton Town		
1935	Blackwell Colliery		
Total		275	(94)
- * Club domestic league appearances and goals

Harold Hill (24 September 1899 – 1969) was an English professional footballer who played in the Football League for Chesterfield, Mansfield Town, Notts County and The Wednesday.
