= Irvine Royal Academy =

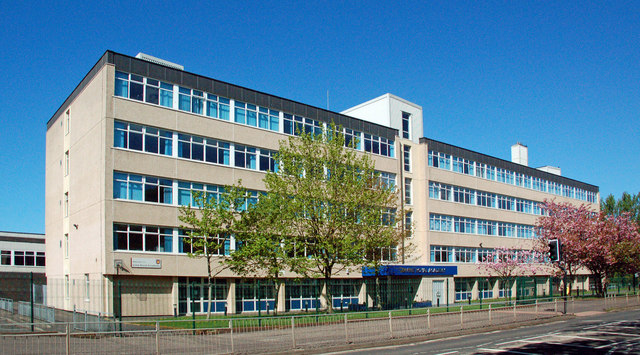

Location
- Irvine, KA12 8SJ; Scotland; 55.632308°N 4.676828°W

Information
- Motto: et in fine causa triumphi
- Denomination: Non-denominational
- Established: 1572; 454 years ago
- School district: North Ayrshire
- Local authority: North Ayrshire
- School code: 8215138
- Head teacher: Linzie Sloan
- Grades: S1–S6
- Age range: 11–18
- Enrollment: 855
- Colour: Blue
- Sports: Football, rugby
- Rival: Greenwood Academy
- Feeder schools: Annick Primary School; Castlepark Primary School; Loudoun-Montgomery Primary School; Woodlands Primary School
- Website: http://www.irvineroyal.co.uk/

Irvine Royal Academy is a six-year non-denominational secondary school in Kilwinning Road, Irvine, North Ayrshire, Scotland.

== History ==
In 1572, King James VI provided funds to found the King's School of Irvine at Kirkgatehead. A new building was erected in 1816 and a Royal Charter granted in 1818 for the directorship of Irvine Royal Academy, which included the Earl of Eglinton, 11 councillors and all who subscribed £50 or more.

The school was taken over by a school board in 1872 as a result of the Education Act and a new building was erected. It opened on 27 December 1901. After fees for secondary pupils were abolished in 1927, the school roll rose and it became necessary to build an annexe on Kilwinning Road, on the academy's sports field, in 1932. The school's primary department was closed in 1952.

A replacement building, which became Ravenspark Academy, opened in August 1969. The old buildings remained open to serve pupils from Dreghorn and Kilwinning. In August 1992, the two academies were amalgamated into Irvine Royal Academy and in June 1993 the old school and its annexe were closed. The new Irvine Royal Academy was officially opened by Councillor Elliot Gray JP on 22 March 1994.

== Modern Day ==
In recent years Irvine Royal has been known for being a partner school of the Glasgow University.

== Notable former pupils ==
- Sir Hilary Rudolph Robert Blood CMG, Governor of Mauritius from 1949–54
- Brian Donohoe, Labour MP since 2005 for South Ayrshire
- Alan Gemmell OBE, director of the British Council in India
- Julie Graham, actress
- Sir Sandy MacAra, epidemiologist and former chairman of the BMA
- Alastair McHarg, former Scotland Rugby Union internationalist (1968–79) 44 caps
- Sir Thomas McKillop, former chairman of RBS, and chief executive from 1999-2006 of AstraZeneca
- Eric Potts
- Brigadier James Wilson CBE, chief executive from 1977-87 of the Livingston Development Corporation
- James Wilson (1895–1917), accountant and footballer

== See also ==
- Irvine RFC
