= Jackie Storer =

English footballer (1908–c.1932)

Personal information
- Full name: John Arthur Storer
- Date of birth: 3 February 1908
- Place of birth: Mexborough, England
- Position: Forward

Senior career*
| Years | Team | Apps | (Gls) |
- Mexborough Athletic
| 1928–1930 | Barnsley | 22 | (6) |
| 1931 | Bristol Rovers | 1 | (0) |
| 1931–1932 | Mansfield Town | 13 | (1) |
- * Club domestic league appearances and goals

John Arthur Storer (3 February 1908 – after 1932) was an English footballer who played in the Football League for Barnsley, Bristol Rovers and Mansfield Town.
