= Charles Williams (Australian footballer) =

Australian rules footballer

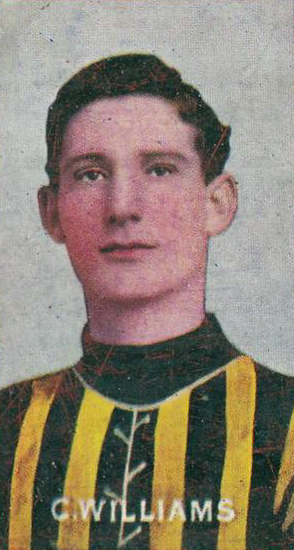
- Cigarette card on Williams in 1908

Personal information
- Full name: Charles Samuel Williams
- Born: 22 January 1881; Richmond, Victoria
- Died: 14 November 1969 (aged 88); Caulfield, Victoria
- Original team: Richmond (VFA)

Playing career^{1}
Years	Club	Games (Goals)
1902–07	Richmond (VFA)	103 (2)
1908	Richmond	3 (0)
1908	Preston (VFA)	1 (0)
- ^{1} Playing statistics correct to the end of 1908.

Charles Samuel Williams (22 January 1881 – 14 November 1969) was an Australian rules footballer who played with Richmond in the Victorian Football League (VFL).
