= William Kirk (footballer) =

English footballer

Personal information
- Full name: William Henry Kirk
- Date of birth: 11 October 1912
- Place of birth: Grantham, England
- Date of death: 1991 (aged 78–79)
- Position: Winger

Senior career*
Years	Team	Apps	(Gls)
1932–1933	Grantham		
1933–1934	Mansfield Town	7	(1)
1934–1935	Gainsborough Trinity		
1935–1936	West Ham United	0	(0)
1936	Yeovil & Petters United		
1937	Worcester City		
1938	Gainsborough Trinity		
- * Club domestic league appearances and goals

William Henry Kirk (11 October 1912 – 1991) was an English professional footballer who played in the Football League for Mansfield Town.
