= James H. Wilson (American football) =

American football coach

Biographical details
- Born: March 6, 1940; Texas, U.S.
- Died: March 27, 2013 (aged 73); Hampton, Virginia, U.S.

Coaching career (HC unless noted)
- 1971–1974: Apprentice

Head coaching record
- Overall: 13–20

James H. Wilson (March 6, 1940 – March 27, 2013) was an American football coach. He was the 25th head football coach at The Apprentice School in Newport News, Virginia and he held that position for four seasons, from 1971 until 1974. His coaching record at Apprentice was 13–20.

== Death ==
Wilson died on March 29, 2013, in Hampton, Virginia.
