= Harry Broome (footballer) =

English footballer

Personal information
- Full name: William Henry Broome
- Date of birth: 16 April 1904
- Place of birth: Chorlton-cum-Hardy, England
- Date of death: 1961 (aged 56–57)
- Position: Forward

Senior career*
Years	Team	Apps	(Gls)
1925	Altrincham		
1926–1927	Bury	0	(0)
1927	Colwyn Bay		
1928	Bangor City		
1928	Caernarvon Athletic		
1929–1930	Crewe Alexandra	30	(5)
1930–1931	Accrington Stanley	33	(9)
1931–1933	Mansfield Town	48	(9)
- * Club domestic league appearances and goals

Harry Broome (16 April 1904 – 1961) was an English footballer who played for Accrington Stanley, Crewe Alexandra and Mansfield Town.
