= Fred Fisher (footballer, born January 1910) =

English footballer

Personal information
- Full name: Frederick Fisher
- Date of birth: 29 January 1910
- Place of birth: Hucknall, England
- Date of death: 1955 (aged 44–45)
- Height: 5 ft 11 in (1.80 m)
- Position: Inside forward

Youth career
- 1927–1928: Hucknall YMCA

Senior career*
Years	Team	Apps	(Gls)
1928	Staveley Town		
1928–1929	Newark Town		
1929–1930	Notts County	3	(1)
1930–1931	Torquay United	7	(1)
1931–1933	Mansfield Town	10	(6)
1933–1935	Swindon Town	46	(16)
1935–1936	Gillingham	17	(6)
1936–1937	Clapton Orient	2	(0)
- Dudley Town
- Bestwood Colliery
- Newport (IOW)
Total		85	(30)
- * Club domestic league appearances and goals

Frederick Fisher (29 January 1910 – 1955) was an English professional footballer who played as an inside forward in the Football League for Clapton Orient, Gillingham, Mansfield Town, Notts County, Swindon Town and Torquay United.

== Career statistics ==
Appearances and goals by club, season and competition
Club	Season	League			FA Cup		Other		Total	
Club	Season	Division	Apps	Goals	Apps	Goals	Apps	Goals	Apps	Goals
Swindon Town	1933–34	Third Division South	30	13	3	1	1 (Note: Appearance in Third Division South Cup)	1	34	15
Swindon Town	1934–35	Third Division South	16	3	0	0	1	0	17	3
Swindon Town	Total		46	16	3	1	2	1	51	18
Gillingham	1935–36	Third Division South	17	6	0	0	1	0	18	6
Career total			63	22	3	1	3	1	69	24
