= Harry Keeling (footballer) =

English footballer

Personal information
- Full name: Harold Keeling
- Date of birth: 10 February 1906
- Place of birth: Huthwaite, England
- Date of death: 1988 (aged 81–82)
- Position: Inside forward

Senior career*
Years	Team	Apps	(Gls)
1922	Huthwaite CWS		
1923	Sutton Town		
1924	Mansfield Town		
1924–1925	Nottingham Forest	0	(0)
1925–1926	Grantham		
1926–1927	Luton Town	0	(0)
1927–1928	Wolverhampton Wanderers	0	(0)
1928–1929	Notts County	0	(0)
1929–1931	Torquay United	26	(10)
1931–1932	Swindon Town	24	(7)
1932–1933	Norwich City	5	(1)
1933–1934	Mansfield Town	8	(0)
1934	Bath City		
1935	Sutton Town		
1936	Hereford United		
1937	Tamworth		
1938	Brierley Hill Alliance		
1938	Hereford United		
- * Club domestic league appearances and goals

Harold Keeling (10 February 1906 – 1988) was an English professional footballer who played in the Football League for Mansfield Town, Norwich City, Swindon Town and Torquay United.
