= Len Featherby =

English footballer

Personal information
- Full name: Walter Leonard Featherby
- Date of birth: 28 July 1905
- Place of birth: King's Lynn, England
- Date of death: 1972 (aged 66–67)
- Position: Inside forward

Senior career*
Years	Team	Apps	(Gls)
1921	Whitefriars		
1922	South Lynn Wednesday		
1923	Lynn Town		
1924–1926	Norwich City	26	(3)
1927	Northfleet United		
1927	Millwall	0	(0)
1927	Peterborough & Fletton United		
1928–1929	Merthyr Town	8	(2)
1929–1930	Wolverhampton Wanderers	21	(6)
1930–1931	Reading	25	(3)
1931	Queens Park Rangers	0	(0)
1931–1932	Mansfield Town	22	(5)
1932–1933	Crewe Alexandra	16	(1)
1933	Merthyr Town		
1933–1935	Plymouth Argyle	8	(1)
1935–1936	Notts County	3	(0)
1936	Scarborough		
1937	King's Lynn		
- * Club domestic league appearances and goals

Walter Leonard Featherby (28 July 1905 – 1972) was an English footballer who played as an inside forward. Featherby had a nomadic career playing for over 16 different clubs.
