= William Foster (footballer) =

English footballer

Personal information
- Full name: William Foster
- Date of birth: 1913
- Place of birth: Hucknall, England
- Position: Winger

Senior career*
Years	Team	Apps	(Gls)
1931	Newstead Colliery		
1932–1934	Mansfield Town	10	(2)
1934	Newstead Colliery		
- * Club domestic league appearances and goals

William Foster (1913 – after 1933) was an English professional footballer who played in the Football League for Mansfield Town.
