= Ernie England =

English footballer (1901–1982)

Personal information
- Date of birth: 3 February 1901
- Place of birth: Shirebrook, Derbyshire, England
- Date of death: 1982 (aged 80–81)
- Height: 5 ft 7 1/2 in (1.71 m)
- Position: Defender

Senior career*
Years	Team	Apps	(Gls)
- Shirebrook
1919–1929	Sunderland	355	(0)
1930–1931	West Ham United	5	(0)
1931–1934	Mansfield Town	130	(3)
- Frickley
Total		490	(3)
- * Club domestic league appearances and goals

Ernie England (3 February 1901 – 22 February 1982) was an English footballer who played for Sunderland as a full back. He made his debut for Sunderland on 27 December 1919 against Manchester City in a 1–0 defeat at Hyde Road. Overall, at his time at Sunderland he made 335 league appearances scoring no goals, though he scored 3 own goals, before joining West Ham United in 1931. He made his West Ham debut on 3 January 1931 in a 5–5 against Aston Villa. Making only five appearances for West Ham he left to join Mansfield Town, for whom he made over 150 appearances. In 1936 he joined Frickley and became club captain.
