= Arthur Weightman =

English footballer

Personal information
- Full name: Arthur William Weightman
- Date of birth: 1 May 1910
- Place of birth: Newark-on-Trent, England
- Date of death: 1979 (aged 68–69)
- Position: Midfielder

Senior career*
Years	Team	Apps	(Gls)
1929–1930	Newark Town		
1930–1931	Torquay United	4	(0)
1931–1933	Mansfield Town	45	(1)
1933–1934	Newark Town		
1934	Tunbridge Wells Rangers		
- * Club domestic league appearances and goals

Arthur William Weightman (1 May 1910 – 1979) was an English footballer who played for Mansfield Town and Torquay United.
