= Jimmy Wilson (footballer, born 1909) =

English footballer

Personal information
- Date of birth: 1 January 1909
- Place of birth: Garforth, England
- Height: 6 ft 0 in (1.83 m)
- Position: Goalkeeper

Senior career*
Years	Team	Apps	(Gls)
- Rothwell Amateurs
1928	Leeds United	3	(0)
1929	Halifax Town	8	(0)
- Shrewsbury Town
- Shirebrook
1931–1932	Mansfield Town	41	(0)
- Sutton Town
1933	Bradford Park Avenue	1	(0)
1934–1937	Bristol City	67	(0)
1938	Bristol Rovers	0	(0)
- * Club domestic league appearances and goals

James E. Wilson (1 January 1909 – after 1937) was an English footballer who played in the Football League for Bradford Park Avenue, Bristol City, Halifax Town, Leeds United and Mansfield Town.
