= Joe Readman =

English footballer

Personal information
- Full name: Joseph Andrew Readman
- Date of birth: 20 November 1901
- Place of birth: West Hartlepool, England
- Date of death: 1973 (aged 71–72)
- Position: Forward

Senior career*
Years	Team	Apps	(Gls)
1921–1922	Wheatley Hill Alliance		
1923–1924	Bolton Wanderers	0	(0)
1924–1927	Bournemouth & Boscombe Athletic	48	(20)
1927–1928	Brighton & Hove Albion	6	(0)
1928–1930	Millwall	56	(20)
1931–1933	Mansfield Town	73	(12)
1933	Ramsgate		
1934	Ramsgate Press Wanderers		
- * Club domestic league appearances and goals

Joseph Andrew Readman (20 November 1901 – 18 January 1973) was an English footballer who played for Bournemouth & Boscombe Athletic, Brighton & Hove Albion, Millwall and Mansfield Town.
