= Sam Robinson (footballer) =

English footballer

Personal information
- Full name: Samuel Henry Robinson
- Date of birth: 26 July 1910
- Place of birth: Hucknall, England
- Date of death: 1995 (aged 84–85)
- Position: Defender

Senior career*
Years	Team	Apps	(Gls)
1928–1929	Luton Town	0	(0)
1929–1930	Bournemouth and Boscombe Athletic	11	(1)
1930–1931	Derby County	0	(0)
1931–1934	Mansfield Town	61	(1)
1933–1934	Clapton Orient	2	(0)
1934	Guildford		
- * Club domestic league appearances and goals

Samuel Henry Robinson (26 July 1910 – 1995) was an English footballer who played for Bournemouth and Boscombe Athleticv, Clapton Orient, Luton Town and Mansfield Town.
