= Albert Robinson (footballer, born 1913) =

English footballer

Personal information
- Full name: Albert Robinson
- Date of birth: 1913
- Place of birth: South Normanton, England
- Date of death: unknown
- Position: Defender

Senior career*
Years	Team	Apps	(Gls)
1930–1931	South Normanton Miners Welfare		
1931–1933	Mansfield Town	12	(0)
1933–1934	Derby County	0	(0)
1934	Sutton Town		
- * Club domestic league appearances and goals

Albert Robinson (born 1913, date of death unknown) was an English footballer who played for Mansfield Town.
