= Leslie Butler (footballer) =

English footballer

Personal information
- Full name: Edward Leslie Butler
- Date of birth: 25 February 1908
- Place of birth: Pinxton, England
- Date of death: 1985 (aged 76–77)
- Position: Defender

Senior career*
Years	Team	Apps	(Gls)
1930–1931	Derby County	0	(0)
1931–1932	Southend United	0	(0)
1932–1934	Mansfield Town	46	(5)
1934	Ollerton Colliery		
- * Club domestic league appearances and goals

Edward Leslie Butler (25 February 1908 – 1985) was an English professional footballer who played in the Football League for Mansfield Town.
