= Harry Johnson (footballer, born 1899) =

English footballer

Personal information
- Date of birth: 4 January 1899
- Place of birth: Ecclesfield, Sheffield, England
- Date of death: May 1981 (aged 82)
- Height: 5 ft 9 in (1.75 m)
- Position: Striker

Youth career
- Ecclesfield

Senior career*
Years	Team	Apps	(Gls)
1916–1931	Sheffield United	313	(201)
1932–1935	Mansfield Town	163	(104)
Total		476	(305)
- * Club domestic league appearances and goals

Harry Johnson (4 January 1899 – May 1981) was an English footballer who played as a striker for Sheffield United and Mansfield Town.

== Career ==
=== Sheffield United ===
Johnson played for Sheffield United between 1916 and 1931. He is Sheffield United's all-time top goalscorer with 201 goals. He played his first match in United colours for a Reserve side at Heckmondwike, and upset the home fans who "displayed a certain amount of animosity," and one irate man even waved an unloaded gun at him. Johnson was an FA Cup winner with The Blades when they beat Cardiff City in 1925 and also represented The Football League

=== Mansfield Town ===
He played for Mansfield Town between 1932 and 1935, for which he is also all-time top goalscorer with 114 goals in all competitions.

== Personal life ==
His father, also known as Harry (although his birth forename was William), also played for Sheffield United and gained six caps for England as well as appearing in three FA Cup Finals, winning two Winners medals, a League Championship Winners medal in 1898 whilst also representing the Football League. His younger brother Tom also played for the Blades, appearing in the 1936 FA Cup Final v Arsenal and also captaining the team to promotion in 1939.

== Honours ==
Sheffield United

- FA Cup: 1924–25
