= Shirebrook Miners Welfare F.C. =

Shirebrook Miners Welfare
- Full name: Shirebrook Miners Welfare Football Club

Shirebrook Miners Welfare F.C. was an English football club based in Shirebrook, Derbyshire.

== History ==
Formed as Shirebrook, they joined the Notts & Derbyshire League in 1911, finishing third in their first season and winning the subsidiary competition. They subsequently joined the Central Alliance in 1912, the year in which they first entered the FA Cup. The following season they won the Central Alliance, and went on to finish as runners-up in 1914–15.

They rejoined the Central Alliance after World War I, finishing as runners-up in 1920–21. They left the league in 1924, and joined the Midland League in 1925, and reached the 1st round of the FA Cup in 1927 and 1928, losing to Tranmere Rovers and Mansfield Town in respective years.

In 1953 they changed their name to Shirebrook Miners Welfare, and last entered the FA Cup in 1961.

== Honours ==
- Central Alliance
  - Champions 1913–14
- Notts & Derbyshire League
  - Subsidiary Competition winners 1910–11

== Records ==
- Highest league finish
  - Midland League – 8th, 1927–28
- FA Cup
  - 1st round, 1927–28, 1928–29
