= List of AFC Bournemouth players (1–24 appearances) =

This is a list of footballers who have played 1 to 24 senior matches for AFC Bournemouth (previously Bournemouth & Boscombe Athletic). Appearances and goals are for all competitive matches.

Name	Nationality	Position	Club career	Appearances	Goals	Notes
Ike Whelpton	England	GK	1923	1	0	
Albert Simpson	England	FW	1923-1924	12	3	
Jimmy Tait	Scotland	FW	1923-1924	12	4	
Harry Wingham	England	DF	1923-1924	18	0	
George Donowa	England	MF	1924	1	0	
Harry Walker	England	DF	1924	1	0	
Ken Marshall	England	GK	1924	2	0	
Henry Meyer	England	FW	1924-1925	2	0	
Frank Harrison	England	MF	1924	4	0	
Tom Charleston	England	DF	1924	7	0	
Wilf Budden	England	MF	1924-1925	10	1	
George Richardson	England	DF	1924-1925	10	0	
Hardie Rattray	Scotland	FW	1924	12	2	
Herbert Lock	England	GK	1924	13	0	
Doug Hayward	England	MF	1925	1	0	
Edmund Lowson	England	DF	1925	5	0	
Bert Bliss	England	FW	1925	6	0	
Tommy Davies	Wales	DF	1925	6	0	
Mike McCulloch	Scotland	FW	1925	10	1	
Jimmy Armstrong	England	DF	1925-1927	15	0	
George Marshall	England	DF	1925	20	0	
William Bow	Wales	GK	1926	1	0	
Cliff Foster	England	MF	1926	4	0	
Jimmy Wood	England	MF	1926-1927	7	1	
Frank Craig	Wales	FW	1926-1927	8	0	
Robert Walker	England	DF	1926-1929	22	0	
William Chivers	England	MF	1927	1	0	
Billy Tyler	England	DF	1927	1	0	
Andrew Young	England	FW	1927	2	0	
Leslie Crump	England	MF	1927	4	0	
David Baynham	Wales	DF	1927-1928	7	0	
Bob Drummond	Scotland	FW	1927-1928	7	1	
Tot Pike	England	FW	1927-1928	20	6	
Thomas Johnstone	Unknown	MF	1928	1	0	
Norman McKay	England	FW	1928	1	0	
Sam Dudley	England	DF	1928	2	0	
William Nichol	Scotland	FW	1928	2	0	
Wilf Threlfall	England	MF	1928	3	0	
Tommy Duff	England	MF	1928	3	0	
Emlyn Jones	Wales	FW	1928	6	2	
Vincent Murphy	England	MF	1928	6	0	
Jack Johnson	England	DF	1928-1930	12	4	
George Graham	Scotland	FW	1928-1929	22	3	
Harry Isherwood	England	DF	1928-1929	24	0	
Harry Kinghorn	Scotland	GK	1929	1	0	
Ernie Kirkpatrick	England	FW	1929	2	0	
James Lumsden	Scotland	FW	1929	2	0	
George Crawford	England	DF	1929-1930	4	0	
Tommy McInally	Scotland	FW	1929-1930	14	1	
Alf Lampard	England	GK	1930	2	0	
Lance Hutchinson	England	MF	1930	2	0	
Frank Peed	Argentina	FW	1930	2	0	
Bob Green	England	FW	1930-1931	6	0	
Mattha Morgan	Scotland	MF	1930	6	0	
Harold Turner	England	DF	1930-1931	9	0	
Sam Robinson	England	DF	1930	11	1	
Ernie Webster	England	DF	1931-1932	7	0	
Albert Thain	England	FW	1931	21	6	
George Stevens	England	MF	1932	1	0	
Emlyn Williams	Wales	FW	1932	6	2	
Robert McGowan	Scotland	FW	1932-1933	6	1	
Sid Nicholson	England	DF	1932-1933	8	0	
Bobby Whitelaw	Scotland	DF	1932-1933	10	2	
Don McPhail	Scotland	MF	1932-1933	14	0	
Johnny Ledwidge	Unknown	FW	1932-1933	19	7	
Fred Wilson	England	FW	1933	3	1	
George Lax	England	DF	1933-1934	7	1	
Bill Tunstall	England	FW	1933	8	2	
Charlie Wilson	England	DF	1933-1934	11	0	
Bill Berry	England	MF	1933-1934	14	2	
George Dumbrell	England	DF	1933-1934	14	2	
Stuart Littlewood	England	FW	1933-1934	20	13	
Robert Trevisone	England	GK	1934	1	0	
Bill Cameron	Scotland	FW	1934	1	0	
Jack Richardson	England	FW	1934	1	0	
Herbert Lawson	England	FW	1934-1935	4	0	
Richard Twiss	England	DF	1934-1935 1939	6	0	
Albert Curwood	England	FW	1934-1935	7	0	
Tommy Moore	England	FW	1934-1935	7	2	
Jock Richardson	Scotland	DF	1934	8	0	
Alf Messer	England	DF	1934-1935	10	0	
Tommy Tait	England	FW	1934	14	7	
George Smith	Wales	DF	1934-1935	18	0	
Charles Adkins	England	FW	1935	1	0	
Tich Pearson	England	MF	1935	1	0	
Ron Morgan	Wales	FW	1935-1936	4	2	
Wilf Bucknall	England	DF	1935-1936	5	0	
Meynell Burgin	England	FW	1935-1936	8	3	
Wally Akers	England	MF	1935-1936	15	4	
Rupert Blezard	England	MF	1936	1	0	
Jack Flaherty	England	FW	1936	1	0	
Eric Davis	England	FW	1936	2	0	
Davie Hutchinson	Scotland	FW	1936	2	1	
Alf Hooton	England	DF	1936	4	0	
Cyril Thompson	Unknown	FW	1936	5	1	
Ernie Parker	England	MF	1936-1937	7	0	
Steve Kilcar	Scotland	FW	1936-1937	9	1	
Reg Keating	England	FW	1936-1937	13	5	
Harry Gilmore	England	DF	1936-1937	15	0	
Roy Burns	England	MF	1936-1937	20	4	
Harold Tarrant	England	MF	1937	1	0	
Joe Harvey	England	DF	1937	2	0	
Bertie Brown	Unknown	MF	1937-1938	3	0	
Alec Milne	Scotland	FW	1937	3	0	
Eden Taylor	England	FW	1937	6	2	
Henry Picton	Wales	DF	1937-1938	7	0	
Arthur Rhodes	England	FW	1937-1938	8	3	
Bill Coley	England	DF	1937-1938	13	0	
William O'Brien	Scotland	FW	1937-1938	16	5	
Thomas Cooke	England	DF	1937	20	0	
Jack Rowley	England	FW	1937	24	11	
Arthur Keeley	England	FW	1938	2	0	
Eric Sibley	England	DF	1938	7	0	
Fred Shaw	England	FW	1938-1939	11	2	
Billy Elliott	England	MF	1938	12	3	
Alan Fletcher	England	FW	1938-1939	14	1	
Jack Jones	Wales	DF	1938-1939	14	2	
Bill Langley	England	FW	1938-1939	24	15	
Percy Bright	England	FW	1939	1	0	
Charlie Wilkinson	England	DF	1939	1	0	
Ronnie Ranson	England	DF	1939	2	0	
Harry Cooke	England	DF	1939-1945	4	0	
Leonard Smart	England	MF	1945	1	0	
David Thomas	Unknown	DF	1945	1	0	
Thomas Mayes	England	MF	1945	2	0	
Jack Thomas	England	FW	1945	2	3	
Fred Troke	England	DF	1945	2	0	
John Rose	England	MF	1946	1	0	
John Currie	England	MF	1946-1947	7	1	
Jimmy Hutchinson	England	FW	1946	8	3	
Charlie Longdon	England	FW	1946-1947	9	1	
Les Sille	England	MF	1947	1	0	
Tom Liddle	England	DF	1947	1	0	
Bob Young	England	DF	1947	1	0	
Mitch Barclay	Scotland	FW	1947-1948	5	2	
Murdoch Dickie	Scotland	MF	1947	17	1	
Les Blizzard	England	DF	1948	1	0	
Wally Stanners	Scotland	GK	1948	3	0	
Ken Holland	England	FW	1948	3	0	
Glan Jones	Wales	MF	1948	9	3	
Wally Roberts	Wales	DF	1948-1950	16	0	
Ron Young	England	DF	1948-1949	18	0	
Wally Hanlon	Scotland	MF	1948-1949	19	3	
Ken Bennett	England	FW	1948-1949	20	1	
Micky Reid	England	FW	1949	5	2	
George Duke	England	GK	1949	10	0	
Dennis Martin	England	DF	1949-1950 1954	23	0	
Pat Barry	England	DF	1950	4	0	
Des Collins	England	MF	1950	5	1	
Ron Meadows	England	GK	1950-1952	16	0	
Gordon Haigh	England	FW	1950	18	3	
Hugh Evans	Wales	FW	1950-1951	23	8	
Dickie Girling	England	MF	1951-1952	4	0	
David Wilkinson	England	FW	1951-1952	8	3	
Ray Haddington	England	FW	1952	2	0	
Jack Hobbs	England	FW	1953-1954	6	1	
Billy Hughes	Northern Ireland	MF	1953-1954	16	1	
Billy Waugh	Scotland	MF	1953-1954	18	3	
Terry Murray	Republic of Ireland	FW	1954-1955	13	1	
Ken Whiteside	England	FW	1955	1	0	
Eric Wilkinson	England	FW	1955-1956	4	0	
Bill Ellaway	England	FW	1956-1957	4	0	
Joe Tyrell	England	FW	1957-1958	3	1	
Ken Brown	England	MF	1957	6	1	
Dennis Bushby	England	DF	1957-1958	6	0	
Sid Miles	England	DF	1958	1	0	
Tommy Anderson	Scotland	FW	1958	5	1	
Ray Hampson	England	MF	1958	15	2	
John Flood	England	MF	1958-1959	18	3	
Eddie McManus	England	MF	1959-1960	4	0	
Jack Thomas	England	GK	1959	4	0	
Jack Gregory	England	DF	1959	17	0	
Mike Lynne	England	GK	1959-1960	17	0	
Bob Massey	England	DF	1960-1961	5	0	
Jim Lovie	Scotland	MF	1960-1961	9	0	
Johnny King	England	MF	1960-1961	24	1	
Peter Hall	England	MF	1961	1	0	
Ray Massey	Unknown	DF	1961	1	0	
Louis Bimpson	England	FW	1961	11	1	
Alex Bain	Scotland	FW	1961-1962	11	5	
Dave Bennett	England	MF	1961-1962	12	2	
Bob MacDonald	Scotland	DF	1963	1	0	
Keith Brown	England	DF	1963-1965	16	0	
Ricky George	England	MF	1965	3	0	
Robbie Saunders	England	MF	1965-1966	3	0	
Bob Walker	England	DF	1965-1966	10	0	
Bill McKinney	England	DF	1965	19	0	
Ken Oliver	England	FW	1966-1967	14	4	
Tommy McKechnie	Scotland	FW	1966-1967	16	3	
Kim Book	England	GK	1967-1969	3	0	
Dickie Hall	England	MF	1967-1968	15	0	
Rod Adams	England	FW	1967-1968	19	4	
Peter Norton	England	DF	1967-1968	21	1	
John Hill	England	DF	1968	4	0	
Derek Burns	England	DF	1968-1969	4	0	
Dave Simmons	England	FW	1968-1969	7	3	
Mel Simmonds	England	MF	1969-1970	6	0	
Peter Harman	England	FW	1970	1	0	
Alan Green	England	FW	1970	1	0	
Ron Tilsed	England	GK	1970	2	0	
Alec Bugg	England	GK	1970	4	0	
Dennis Allen	England	MF	1970	19	4	
Pat Holland	England	MF	1971	10	0	
Ian Davidson	England	MF	1971-1972	10	0	
Jim De Garis	England	MF	1971-1972	16	0	
Ian Gibson	Scotland	MF	1972-1974	24	1	
John Parsons	Wales	FW	1973-1974	8	1	
Paul Aimson	England	FW	1973	9	2	
Peter Feely	England	FW	1973-1974	11	2	
John Rutter	England	DF	1974	4	0	
Gareth Jones	Wales	MF	1974	6	0	
Harry Falconer	England	DF	1974-1975	7	0	
Wayne Talkes	England	MF	1974	7	0	
Neil Merrick	England	DF	1974-1975	17	0	
John O'Rourke	England	FW	1974-1975	23	4	
Gary Russo	England	DF	1975	2	0	
Doug Livermore	England	MF	1975	10	0	
John Rudge	England	FW	1975-1977	21	1	
Bobby McAlinden	England	MF	1976	1	0	
Steve Grapes	England	MF	1976	7	1	
Billy Steele	Scotland	MF	1976	7	2	
Steve Gritt	England	MF	1976-1977	8	3	
Steve Chalk	England	GK	1976-1978	11	0	
Bruce Stuckey	England	MF	1977	5	0	
Forbes Phillipson-Masters	England	DF	1977	7	2	
Terry Shanahan	England	FW	1977-1978	19	1	
Trevor Wallbridge	England	FW	1978	1	0	
Graham Weeks	England	MF	1978-1979	4	0	
Joey Scott	England	FW	1978-1979	22	4	
Brian Benjafield	England	MF	1979	2	0	
Barrie Thomas	Wales	MF	1979	4	0	
Jeff Bryant	England	DF	1979-80	18	2	
Kevin Allen	England	DF	1980	1	0	
Danny Bailey	England	MF	1980	2	0	
Neil Prosser	England	FW	1980	2	0	
Mark Elliott	Wales	MF	1980	4	0	
Don Givens	Republic of Ireland	FW	1980	5	4	
Eddie Prudham	England	FW	1980	6	0	
Billy Elliott	England	MF	1980	13	1	
Dave Webb	England	DF	1980-1982	13	1	
Martin McGrath	England	MF	1980-1981	24	0	
Gary Pugh	England	MF	1981	3	1	
Alan Whittle	England	FW	1981	9	0	
Derek Dawkins	England	DF	1981-1982	13	0	
Eddie Kelly	Scotland	MF	1981	13	3	
Paul Edmunds	England	MF	1981-1982	18	2	
Peter Aitken	Wales	DF	1982	1	0	
Charlie George	England	FW	1982	2	0	
Brian Mundee	England	DF	1982-1983	6	0	
Ivan Golac	Yugoslavia	DF	1982-1983	10	0	
Brian O'Donnell	Scotland	MF	1982-1983	17	0	
George Best	Northern Ireland	FW	1983	5	0	
David Madden	England	MF	1983	5	0	
Neil Ramsbottom	England	GK	1983	5	0	
Jimmy Neighbour	England	MF	1983	6	0	
Martin Duffield	England	MF	1983	7	1	
Max Thompson	England	DF	1983	11	0	
Ray Train	England	MF	1983-1984	11	0	
Paul Jones	Unknown	MF	1984	1	0	
Morgan Lewis	England	MF	1984-1987	17	0	
Billy Clark	England	DF	1985-1987	4	0	
Steve Claridge	England	FW	1985 2006	9	1	
Tony White	England	DF	1986	1	0	
Tommy Keane	Republic of Ireland	MF	1986-1987	4	0	
Adrian Randall	England	MF	1986-1988	6	0	
Lee Bolson	England	DF	1987	1	0	
Brent Goulet	United States	FW	1987-1988	7	0	
David Armstrong	England	MF	1987-1988	11	3	
David Shearer	Scotland	FW	1987-1988	12	3	
Tony Sealy	England	FW	1987	13	2	
David Langan	Republic of Ireland	DF	1987-1988	21	0	
Phil Kite	England	GK	1989-1990	8	0	
Bobby Barnes	Jamaica	MF	1989	15	0	
David Morris	England	DF	1990	1	0	
Neil Slatter	Wales	DF	1990	6	0	
Richard Cadette	England	FW	1990	8	1	
Peter Guthrie	England	GK	1990-1991	13	0	
Paul Mitchell	England	MF	1990-1993 1996	18	0	
Jamie Redknapp	England	MF	1990-1991	21	0	
Brian Statham	England	DF	1991	3	0	
Steve Baker	England	DF	1991	8	0	
Steve Butler	England	FW	1992	1	0	
Danny Holmes	England	MF	1992	1	0	
Steve Lovell	Wales	FW	1992	5	1	
Dave Regis	England	FW	1992	6	2	
Nicky Morgan	England	FW	1992	9	3	
Peter Scott	England	MF	1992-1993	14	0	
David Smith	England	MF	1993	1	0	
David Williams	Wales	MF	1993	1	0	
Graham Mitchell	England	DF	1993-1994	4	0	
Peter Beadle	England	FW	1993	9	2	
David Kevan	Scotland	MF	1994	1	0	
David Adekola	Nigeria	FW	1994	1	0	
Chris Ferrett	England	MF	1994	1	0	
David Wells	England	GK	1994	1	0	
Gareth Williams	England	MF	1994	1	0	
Stuart Barfoot	England	DF	1994	3	0	
Lee Russell	England	DF	1994	3	0	
Jamie Reeve	England	FW	1994	10	0	
Tony Scully	Republic of Ireland	MF	1994	10	3	
Chris Burns	England	MF	1994	14	1	
Justin Skinner	England	DF	1994	16	0	
Tony Stephens	England	MF	1995	1	0	
Steve Strong	England	MF	1995-1996	3	0	
Ali Santos	United States	FW	1995-1996	4	0	
Jamie Cureton	England	FW	1995	6	0	
Michael Duberry	England	DF	1995	8	0	
George Ndah	England	FW	1995-1996	13	2	
Marcus Oldbury	England	MF	1995-1996	16	1	
Jamie Victory	England	DF	1995-1996	20	1	
Roy O'Brien	Republic of Ireland	DF	1996	1	0	
Iyesden Christie	England	FW	1996	4	0	
Manny Omoyinmi	Nigeria	FW	1996	7	0	
Keith Scott	England	FW	1996	8	1	
Leo Cotterell	England	DF	1996-1997	9	0	
Rio Ferdinand	England	DF	1996-1997	11	0	
Andy Marshall	England	GK	1996	11	0	
Chris Casper	England	DF	1996	16	1	
Dale Gordon	England	MF	1996	19	0	
Graeme Tomlinson	England	FW	1997	7	1	
Justin Harrington	England	MF	1997-1998	11	0	
Paul Teather	England	MF	1997-1998	12	0	
Tony Griffin	England	DF	1998-1999	6	0	
Roger Boli	France	FW	1998-1999	10	0	
Mohamed Berthe	Guinea	MF	1998	21	2	
Jamie Jenkins	Wales	DF	1999	1	0	
Terrell Forbes	England	DF	1999	4	0	
Kevin Betsy	Seychelles	FW	1999	5	0	
Stuart Elliott	England	MF	1999-2000	8	0	
Gordon Watson	England	FW	1999-2000	11	0	
Joe Sheerin	England	FW	2000	4	1	
David Woozley	England	DF	2000	6	0	
Justin Keeler	England	MF	2000-2001	7	0	
Stev Angus	England	DF	2000	9	0	
John O'Shea	Republic of Ireland	DF	2000	11	1	
Nick Fenton	England	DF	2000	13	0	
James Ford	England	MF	2000-2002	13	0	
Peter Grant	Scotland	MF	2000-2001	18	0	
Mickaël Ménétrier	France	GK	2000-2002	18	0	
Danny Smith	England	DF	2000-2002	24	0	
David Birmingham	England	DF	2001-2002	5	0	
John Melligan	Republic of Ireland	MF	2001-2002	9	0	
Amos Foyewa	England	FW	2001-2003	12	0	
Trésor Kandol	Congo	FW	2001-2002	15	1	
Jamie Ashdown	England	GK	2002	2	0	
Alan Blayney	Northern Ireland	GK	2002	2	0	
Liam Ridgewell	England	DF	2002	5	0	
Kieren McAnspie	England	FW	2002	7	1	
Chris Tardif	England	GK	2002-2003	15	0	
Scott McDonald	Australia	FW	2003	8	1	
Phil Gulliver	England	DF	2003	9	0	
Gareth Williams	Wales	FW	2004	1	0	
Ryan Moss	England	FW	2004	1	0	
Diogo Andrade	Portugal	MF	2004	2	0	
Martin Cranie	England	DF	2004	3	0	
Adam Green	England	DF	2004	3	0	
James Rowe	England	MF	2004-2006	4	0	
James Coutts	England	MF	2004-2006	17	0	
Jamie Whisken	England	MF	2005	1	0	
Kirk Hudson	England	FW	2005	2	0	
Frankie Simek	United States	DF	2005	8	0	
Matt Mills	England	DF	2005	12	3	
James Keene	England	FW	2005	14	4	
Conal Platt	England	FW	2006	1	0	
Daryl Fordyce	Republic of Ireland	MF	2006	3	0	
Aaron Brown	England	DF	2006	4	0	
Matthew Connolly	England	DF	2006	5	1	
Frank Songo'o	Cameroon	MF	2006	5	0	
Adam Griffiths	Australia	DF	2006	7	1	
Ryan Bertrand	England	DF	2006-2007	7	0	
Simon Gillett	England	MF	2006-2007	7	1	
Lionel Ainsworth	England	MF	2006	9	0	
Jack Cork	England	MF	2006-2007	9	0	
Ben Rix	England	MF	2006	11	0	
Leon Best	England	FW	2006-2007	17	3	
Michael Standing	England	MF	2007	1	0	
Rob Newman	England	DF	2007	1	0	
Dominic Shimmin	England	DF	2007	2	0	
James Lawson	England	FW	2007	4	0	
Adam Lallana	England	MF	2007	4	0	
Bjarni Viðarsson	Iceland	MF	2007	6	1	
Josh Walker	England	MF	2007	6	0	
Scott Golbourne	England	DF	2007	8	1	
Jean-François Christophe	France	MF	2007-2008	11	1	
James Henry	England	MF	2007-2008	11	4	
Russ Perrett	England	DF	2007-2008	11	0	
David McGoldrick	England	FW	2007	12	6	
Alex Pearce	England	DF	2007-2008	12	0	
Jem Karacan	England	MF	2007-2008	17	2	
Paul Telfer	Scotland	MF	2007	24	0	
Matt Finlay	England	DF	2008	1	0	
Billy Franks	England	DF	2008	1	0	
Steve Hutchings	England	FW	2008	1	0	
Carl Pettefer	England	MF	2008	2	0	
Carl Preston	England	MF	2008	2	0	
Michael Rankine	England	FW	2008	4	0	
Ricky Sappleton	Jamaica	FW	2008	4	1	
Craig Lindfield	England	FW	2008	5	1	
Blair Sturrock	Scotland	FW	2008	5	0	
Ryan Pryce	England	GK	2008	6	0	
Scott Wagstaff	England	MF	2008	6	0	
David Forde	Republic of Ireland	GK	2008	11	0	
Jo Tessem	Norway	MF	2008	11	0	
Marek Štěch	Czech Republic	GK	2009	1	0	
David Button	England	GK	2009	4	0	
George Webb	England	MF	2009	4	0	
Anthony Edgar	England	MF	2009	4	0	
Dan Thomas	England	GK	2009-2010	4	0	
Jake Thomson	England	MF	2009	6	1	
Jayden Stockley	England	FW	2009-2011	22	2	
Jon Stewart	England	GK	2010-2011	5	0	
Elliot Ward	England	MF	2011	1	0	
Josh Carmichael	England	MF	2011-2012	4	0	
Nicholas Bignall	England	FW	2011	5	0	
Ben Williamson	England	FW	2011	5	0	
Charlie Sheringham	England	FW	2011	7	1	
Lauri Dalla Valle	Finland	FW	2011	8	2	
Ryan Doble	Wales	FW	2011	8	0	
Jaime Peters	Canada	MF	2011	10	0	
Nathan Byrne	England	DF	2011	12	0	
Mathieu Baudry	France	DF	2011	13	1	
Alex Parsons	England	FW	2012	1	0	
Dan Strugnell	England	DF	2012	1	0	
Frank Demouge	Netherlands	FW	2012	2	0	
Lorenzo Davids	Netherlands	MF	2012	3	0	
Josh Wakefield	England	DF	2012	4	0	
Zavon Hines	England	FW	2012	8	0	
Lee Barnard	England	FW	2012	16	4	
David James	England	GK	2012-2013	19	0	
Marcos Painter	Republic of Ireland	DF	2013	2	0	
Stephen Henderson	Republic of Ireland	GK	2013	2	0	
Jack Collison	Wales	MF	2013	4	0	
Mohamed Coulibaly	Senegal	MF	2013-2014	8	0	
Danny Seaborne	England	DF	2013	13	0	
Baily Cargill	England	DF	2014-2017	11	0	
Harry Cornick	England	FW	2015	1	0	
Christian Atsu	Ghana	MF	2015	2	0	
Matt Butcher	England	MF	2015-2016	2	0	
Kenwyne Jones	Trinidad and Tobago	FW	2015	6	1	
Lee Tomlin	England	FW	2015-2016	10	1	
Sylvain Distin	France	DF	2015-2016	17	0	
Adam Federici	Australia	GK	2015-2017	17	0	
Glenn Murray	England	FW	2015-2016	22	4	
Tyrone Mings	England	DF	2015-2018	23	0	
Corey Jordan	England	DF	2016	1	0	
Jordan Lee	England	DF	2016-2017	2	0	
Juan Iturbe	Paraguay	MF	2016	4	0	
Emerson Hyndman	United States	MF	2016-2019	8	0	
Brad Smith	Australia	DF	2016-2018	11	0	
Matt Worthington	England	MF	2017	1	0	
Connor Mahoney	England	MF	2018	2	0	
Kyle Taylor	England	MF	2018-2019 2021	3	0	
Nathaniel Clyne	England	DF	2019	14	1	
Ajani Burchall	Bermuda	FW	2020	1	0	
Nnamdi Ofoborh	England	MF	2020	5	0	
Rodrigo Riquelme	Spain	MF	2020-2021	19	2	
Will Dennis	England	GK	2021	1	0	
Ryan Glover	England	MF	2021	1	0	
Brennan Camp	Scotland	DF	2021-2022	2	0	
Ørjan Nyland	Norway	GK	2021-2022	3	0	
Christian Saydee	England	FW	2021-2022	6	1	
Robbie Brady	Republic of Ireland	MF	2021-2022	7	0	
Zeno Rossi	England	DF	2021-2022	7	0	
Shane Long	Republic of Ireland	FW	2021	12	2	
Leif Davis	England	DF	2021-2022	15	0	
Morgan Rogers	England	FW	2021-2022	17	1	
Gary Cahill	England	DF	2021-2022	22	0	
Siriki Dembélé	Ivory Coast	MF	2021-2023	22	2	
Marcondes	Denmark	MF	2021-2022	24	7	
Freddie Woodman	England	GK	2022	1	0	
Brooklyn Genesini	England	DF	2022	1	1	
Ben Greenwood	England	DF	2022	1	0	
Nathan Moriah-Welsh	Guyana	MF	2022	2	0	
Dominic Sadi	England	MF	2022-2025	4	0	
Ethan Laird	England	DF	2022	6	0	
Todd Cantwell	England	MF	2022	12	0	
Ryan Fredericks	England	DF	2022-2023	13	0	
Jack Stephens	England	DF	2022-2023	17	0	
Nat Phillips	England	DF	2022	18	0	
Ionuț Radu	Romania	GK	2023	5	0	
Matías Viña	Uruguay	DF	2023	12	2	
Hamed Traorè	Ivory Coast	MF	2023-2025	14	1	
Daniel Adu-Adjei	England	FW	2024	1	0	
Romain Faivre	France	MF	2024-	6	0	As of end of 2025-26 season
Julián Araujo	Mexico	DF	2024-	14	0	As of end of 2025-26 season
Daniel Jebbison	Canada	FW	2024-	21	3	As of end of 2025-26 season
Zain Silcott-Duberry	England	FW	2025	2	0	
Julio Soler	Argentina	DF	2025-	10	0	As of end of 2025-26 season
Ben Gannon-Doak	Scotland	MF	2025-	9	0	As of end of 2025-26 season
Veljko Milosavljević	Serbia	DF	2025-	7	0	As of end of 2025-26 season
