= Tucking Mill =

Hamlet in Somerset, England

Coordinates: 51.353°N 2.336°W

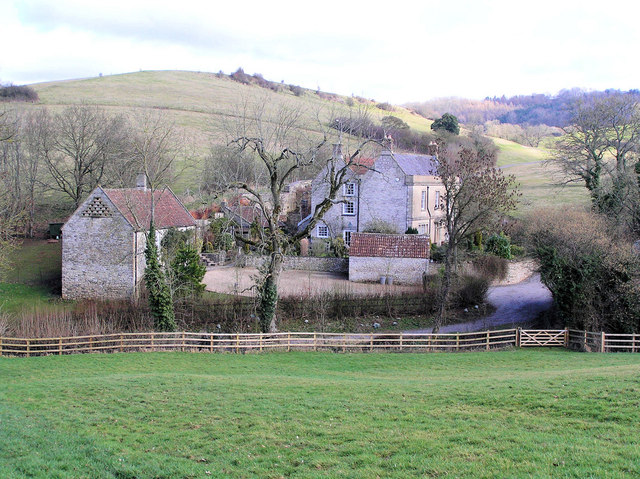

- Location within Somerset
- OS grid reference: ST767615
- Civil parish: Monkton Combe
- Unitary authority: Bath and North East Somerset
- Ceremonial county: Somerset
- Region: South West
- Country: England
- Sovereign state: United Kingdom
- Post town: BATH
- Postcode district: BA2
- Dialling code: 01225
- Police: Avon and Somerset
- Fire: Avon
- Ambulance: South Western
- UK Parliament: Frome and East Somerset

Tucking Mill is a small hamlet within the parish of Monkton Combe, Somerset, England. It lies on Midford Brook and was a key point on the now disused Somerset Coal Canal.

It is at the southern end of the Two Tunnels Greenway which follows the disused railway trackbed of the Somerset and Dorset Joint Railway from East Twerton through the Bath suburb of Oldfield Park to the Devonshire Tunnel, emerging into Lyncombe Vale before entering the Combe Down Tunnel, and then coming out to cross Tucking Mill Viaduct into Midford.

There is also a small reservoir, which is now a fishery for disabled people.

== William Smith's home ==
From 1798 until 1810 Tucking Mill was the home of William Smith, an English geologist, credited with creating the first nationwide geological map. He is known as the "Father of English Geology" for collating the geological history of England and Wales into a single record. He worked on the Somerset coalfield and the Somerset Coal Canal. There is a plaque on Tucking Mill Cottage saying that it was Smith's home, which was erected in 1888, on the mill which was demolished in 1927, and the tablet was mislaid. When the plaque was rediscovered in the 1930s the Geological Society of London and the Bath Royal Literary and Scientific Institution placed it on the 18th-century cottage. However, it is now believed that he actually lived in the nearby Tucking Mill House. During his occupation he built a small railway to transport stone from a quarry at Kingham Field, Combe Down to the canal.

== Fuller's earth factory ==
From 1883 until the end of World War II it was the site of a fuller's earth factory. George Dames and his brother Charles Richard Dames set up a mine in Horsecombe Vale. At the bottom of the valley was the pan grinding works where water from Horsecombe Brook was used to make a slurry from which sand settled at the bottom of troughs. The slurry then passed through an earthenware pipe to Tucking Mill, where a second stage of sedimentation took place in large troughs where it settled for up to 30 days. Once the water had been drained by sluices the damp caked earth was carried in wooden trams to kilns where it was dried for three to four days. The product was used in the oil refining and pharmaceutical industries. The original uses in woollen production no longer used fuller's earth. A railway siding at Midford railway station was built specifically to load fuller's earth.

== Wildlife ==
1282 invertebrate species were recorded at Tucking Mill between 1999 and 2025. Species of note include the protected Marsh Fritillary butterfly, Downland Bee-fly, Rugged Oil Beetle, Necklace Ground Beetle and Purse-web Spider.

== Gallery ==
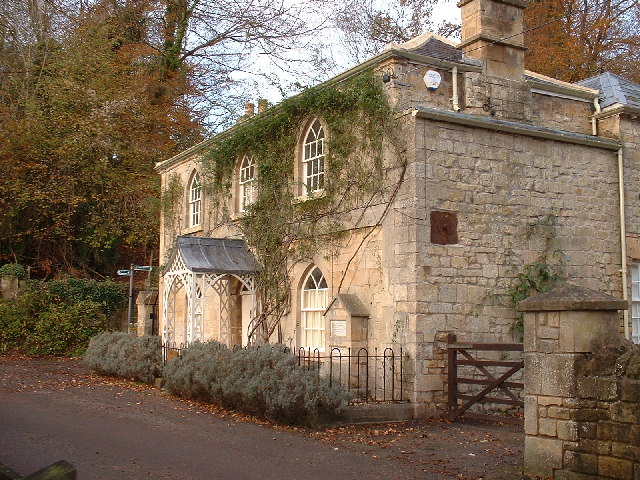
The cottage at Tucking Mill which has a plaque saying that William Smith lived there

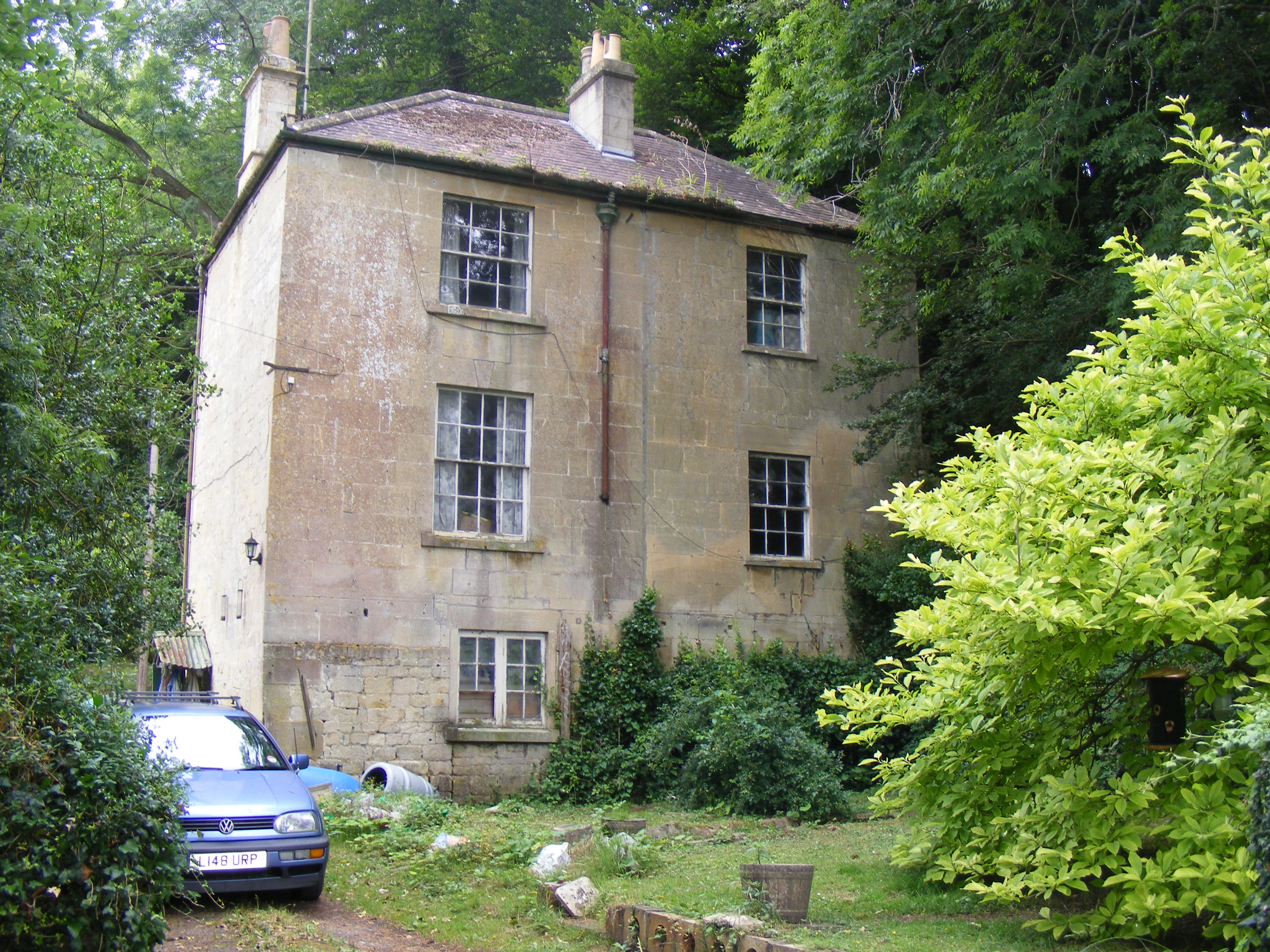
The house William Smith actually lived in
