= George Crawford =

George Crawford may refer to:

== People ==
- George Crawford (Australian politician) (1926–2012), Victorian state politician
- George Crawford (Canadian politician) (1793–1870), founding member of the Canadian Senate
- George Crawford (cricketer) (1890–1975), English first-class cricketer
- George Crawford (footballer) (1905–1975), English footballer
- George A. Crawford (1827–1891), Kansas politician
- George G. Crawford (politician) (1920–2012), California State Assembly member
- George W. Crawford (1798–1872), United States politician from Georgia
- George Crawford (American businessman) (1861–1935), American businessman, founder and executive with Columbia Gas & Electric
- George Williamson Crawford (1877–1972), Connecticut lawyer
- George Crawford (baseball), Major League Baseball outfielder, 1890
- George Gordon Crawford (1869–1936), American industrialist

== Other ==
- SS George G. Crawford, a Liberty ship

== See also ==
- George Crawford Hyndman (1796–1867), Irish auctioneer and biologist
- George Crawford McKindsey (1829–1901), Canadian politician
- George Crawford Platt (1842–1912), Medal of Honor recipient in the American Civil War
