= S&DJR 7F 2-8-0 =

Steam locomotive

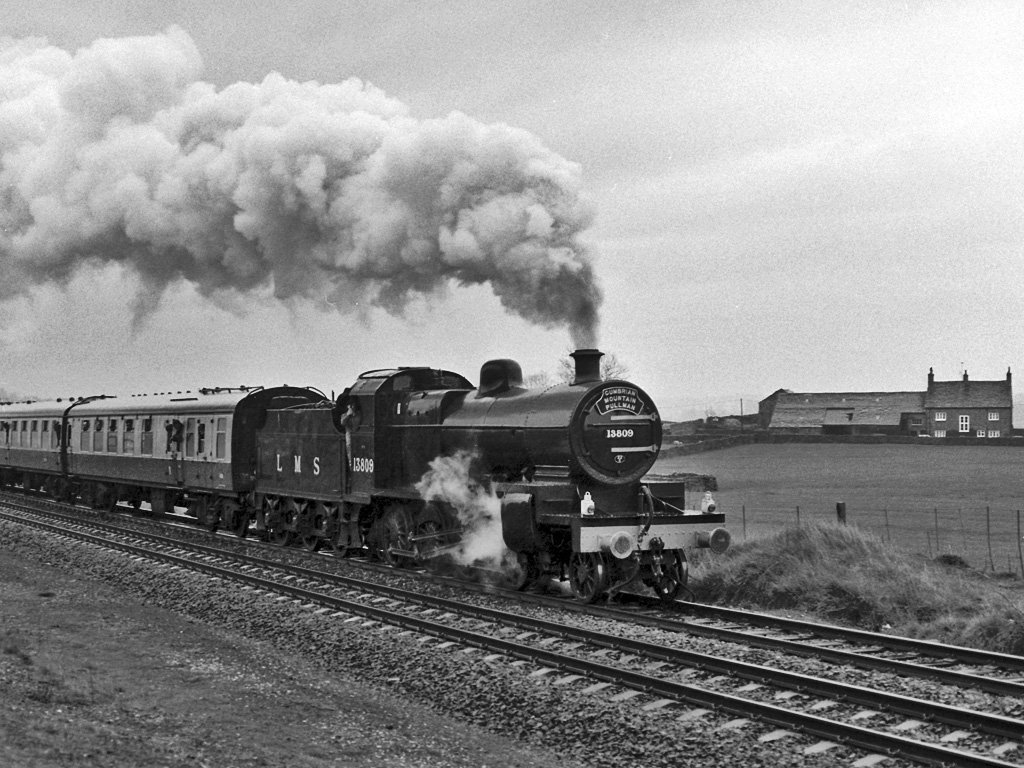
- LMS 13809, a preserved 7F locomotive, working the Hellifield to Carnforth leg of a Cumbrian Mountain Pullman in 1983
Type and origin
- Power type: Steam
- Designer: Henry Fowler
- Builder: Midland Railway, Derby Works (1914), Robert Stephenson & Co. (1925)
- Serial number: RS: 3892–3896
- Build date: 1914 (6), 1925 (5)
- Total produced: 11
Specifications
- Configuration
  - Whyte: 2-8-0
  - UIC: 1′D h2g
- Gauge: 4 ft 8 1/2 in (1,435 mm) standard gauge
- Driver dia.: 4 ft 7 1/2 in (1,410 mm)
- Minimum curve: 6 chains (400 ft; 120 m) normal; 4.5 chains (300 ft; 91 m) dead slow
- Length: 58 ft 10 1/8 in (17.936 m)
- Width: 8 ft 11 7/8 in (2.740 m)
- Height: 13 ft 3 in (4.04 m)
- Axle load: 16 long tons 0 cwt (35,800 lb or 16.3 t)
- Adhesive weight: 56 long tons 0 cwt (125,400 lb or 56.9 t)
- Loco weight: 64 long tons 15 cwt (145,000 lb or 65.8 t)
- Tender weight: 42 long tons 14 cwt (95,600 lb or 43.4 t)
- Fuel type: Coal
- Firebox
  - Grate area: 28.4 sq ft (2.64 m^{2})
- Boiler: G9AS or G9BS
- Boiler pressure: 190 lbf/in^{2} (1.31 MPa)
- Heating surface: G9AS: 1,681 sq ft (156.2 m^{2}); G9BS: 1,845 sq ft (171.4 m^{2}); (both include superheater)
- Cylinders: Two, outside
- Cylinder size: 21 in × 28 in (533 mm × 711 mm)
- Valve gear: Walschaerts
- Valve type: Outside admission piston valves
- Loco brake: Steam
- Train brakes: Vacuum
Performance figures
- Tractive effort: 35,295 lbf (157.00 kN)
- Factor of adh.: 3.5
Career
- Operators: Somerset and Dorset Joint Railway; → London, Midland and Scottish Railway; → British Railways
- Power class: SDJR: 5P/5G; LMS: 7F
- Numbers: S&DJR: 80–90; LMS: 9670–9680; after 1932: 13800–13810; BR: 53800–53810
- Withdrawn: 1959–1964
- Disposition: Two preserved, nine scrapped

53809, at Green Park Station (now a car park) in Bath, 6 March 2006.

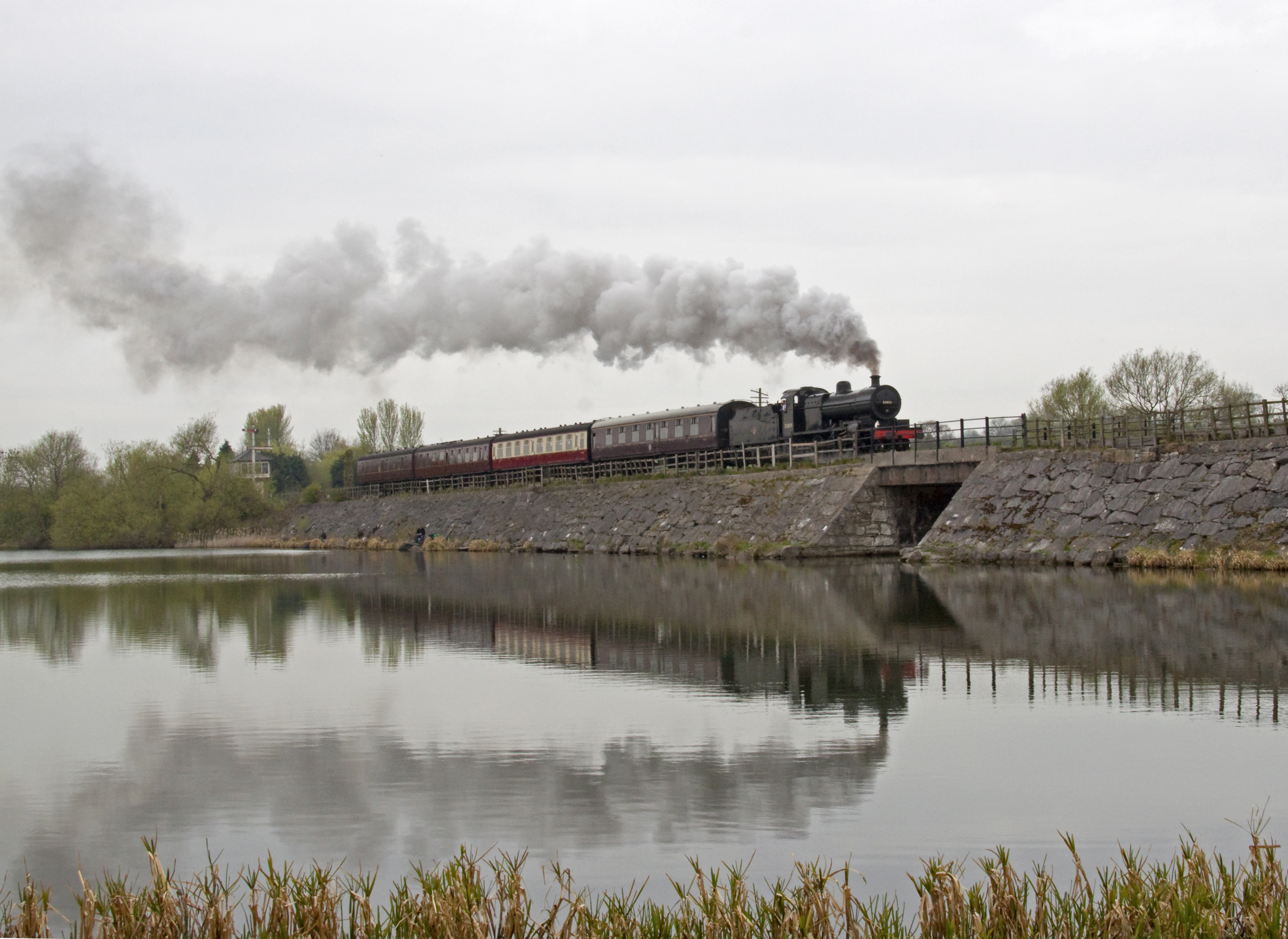
No. 53809 crosses the Butterley Reservoir causeway on the Midland Railway - Butterley

The Somerset and Dorset Joint Railway (S&DJR) 7F 2-8-0 is a class of steam locomotive designed for hauling heavy coal and goods trains. Eleven were built in two batches in 1914 and 1925, and were used until withdrawal between 1959 and 1964. Two are preserved.

== Background ==
The Midland Railway, joint owners of the S&DJR with the London and South Western Railway (L&SWR), were in charge of locomotive policy on the line. The S&DJR was heavily graded and required power over and above what was available from the Midland's small engines. M. H. Ryan, S&DJR locomotive superintendent argued for a type specific to the line.

Two plans for 0-8-0s were suggested in 1907 but would have been too heavy. Needing a special exception to the small engine policy, James Clayton (the draughtsman at Derby) was given a free hand to design the engine, and produced something unlike any other Derby-designed locomotive of the time.

== Design ==
The design used the G9AS boiler from the Midland Compounds, with a Belpaire firebox and Walschaerts valve gear. A leading Bissell truck was added, to distribute the weight, making it a 2-8-0. The cylinders were mounted high on the frame, and sloped, to avoid fouling platforms. Because of the gradients that the loco would face, Clayton provided three steam brake cylinders on the engine and a further one on the tender. In service, the cast iron brake blocks originally fitted wore very quickly, and Ferodo blocks were substituted. The Derby standard axle boxes were fitted, so the engines were still subject to the hot boxes that were a fact of life on the Midland.

As the locomotives were initially too large for some of the turntables, it was envisaged that they would spend half their time travelling in reverse. Consequently, they were fitted with tablet exchanging apparatus on both sides of the locomotive. In addition, the first six were equipped with cab tenders, but these were later removed circa 1920. The 1914-built locomotives were right-hand drive, while the 1925-built were left-hand drive. In all cases the vacuum brake ejector was located on the driver's side of the smokebox.

== Construction ==
Six were built in 1914 and numbered 80–85 by the S&DJR. In 1925 an additional 5 were ordered from Robert Stephenson and Company in Darlington and built with the larger G9BS boilers, becoming numbers 86–90. Two locomotives, 9679 (ex-89) and 9680 (ex-90) received the smaller G9AS boiler in 1930, while the remaining three retained the larger boiler until it was replaced in the 1950s – 53808 in 1953; 53807 in 1954; and 53806 in 1955. These locomotives gained a packing piece between the smaller boiler and original smokebox saddle. The exception was 53807, the smokebox saddle being rotten and replaced with a one-piece unit like the 1914-built locomotives. This locomotive was therefore unique, as only left-hand drive locomotive with a one piece smokebox saddle.

S&DJR No.	LMS No.1	LMS No.2	BR No.	Builder	When built	Withdrawn	Notes
80	9670	13800	53800	Midland Railway	February 1914	June 1959	First to be withdrawn
81	9671	13801	53801	Midland Railway	March 1914	July 1961	
82	9672	13802	53802	Midland Railway	March 1914	March 1960	
83	9673	13803	53803	Midland Railway	April 1914	February 1962	
84	9674	13804	53804	Midland Railway	April 1914	February 1962	
85	9675	13805	53805	Midland Railway	August 1914	March 1961	
86	9676	13806	53806	Robert Stephenson & Co	July 1925	January 1964	
87	9677	13807	53807	Robert Stephenson & Co	July 1925	September 1964	Last to be withdrawn
88	9678	13808	53808	Robert Stephenson & Co	July 1925	March 1964	Preserved
89	9679	13809	53809	Robert Stephenson & Co	July 1925	June 1964	Preserved
90	9680	13810	53810	Robert Stephenson & Co	August 1925	December 1963	

== Accidents and incidents ==
On 20 November 1929, now-preserved locomotive No. 89 (later 53809) was taking a freight train north towards Bath. Travelling through Combe Down Tunnel at slow speed (due to the weight of the train, and the intended stop at Midford) the locomotive crew were overcome by smoke, resulting in the train running away down the hill and crashing in the goods yard outside Bath Green Park. The driver, Henry Jennings, and two members of the yard staff, were all killed in the accident.

== East Midlands trials ==
The success of the class on the Mendip hills prompted the Midland Railway to experiment with their use on the East Midlands coal trains, but they were less satisfactory in this role. The route did not utilise their design for climbing hills, and there were issues of fuel efficiency, with considerable amounts of high quality coal consumed.

== Later life ==
The S&DJR locos were taken into London, Midland and Scottish Railway (LMS) stock in 1930, and renumbered 9670–9680. They were renumbered as 13800–13810 in 1932. On nationalisation in 1948 British Railways (BR) added 40000 to their numbers making them 53800–53810.

Withdrawals of the 1914-built locomotives occurred between 1959 and 1962 and the five 1925-built engines were all withdrawn between 1963 and 1964.

Table of withdrawals
Year	Number in service at start of year	Number withdrawn	Locomotive numbers
1959	11	1	53800
1960	10	1	53802
1961	9	2	53801/05
1962	7	2	53803–04
1963	5	1	53810
1964	4	4	53806–09

== Preservation ==
Two of the 1925-built locomotives have survived, these being No. 88 (9678/13808/53808) and No. 89 (9679/13809/53809).

=== 53808 ===
53808 running in 2018

No. 88/53808 is owned by the Somerset & Dorset Railway Trust (SDRT), based on the Mid-Hants Railway. Purchased for preservation in 1969, it returned to service following restoration at the West Somerset Railway in August 1987 in BR Black (with the Early Crest), and ran up to Spring 1996 when it was withdrawn for overhaul, during which time it only made one visit away from the WSR, to the Severn Valley Railway in September 1995.

After overhaul it returned to service in December 2005 in S&DJR blue livery, which it never carried in service. Again based at the WSR it made three return visits to the SVR in March 2007, March 2008 and September 2014, as well as first time visits to the Mid-Hants Railway in September 2010, and the Great Central Railway in October 2011, before being withdrawn for overhaul in October 2014. This second overhaul was completed in February 2016, with the engine being repainted back into BR black (with the Late Crest) and its BR number 53808. From autumn 2020 the locomotive is now based at the Mid-Hants Railway and in November 2023 the locomotive was withdrawn from service for overhaul after working its final trains on 4 November 2023. At present no confirmation has been made regarding when the engines overhaul will commence.

=== 53809 ===
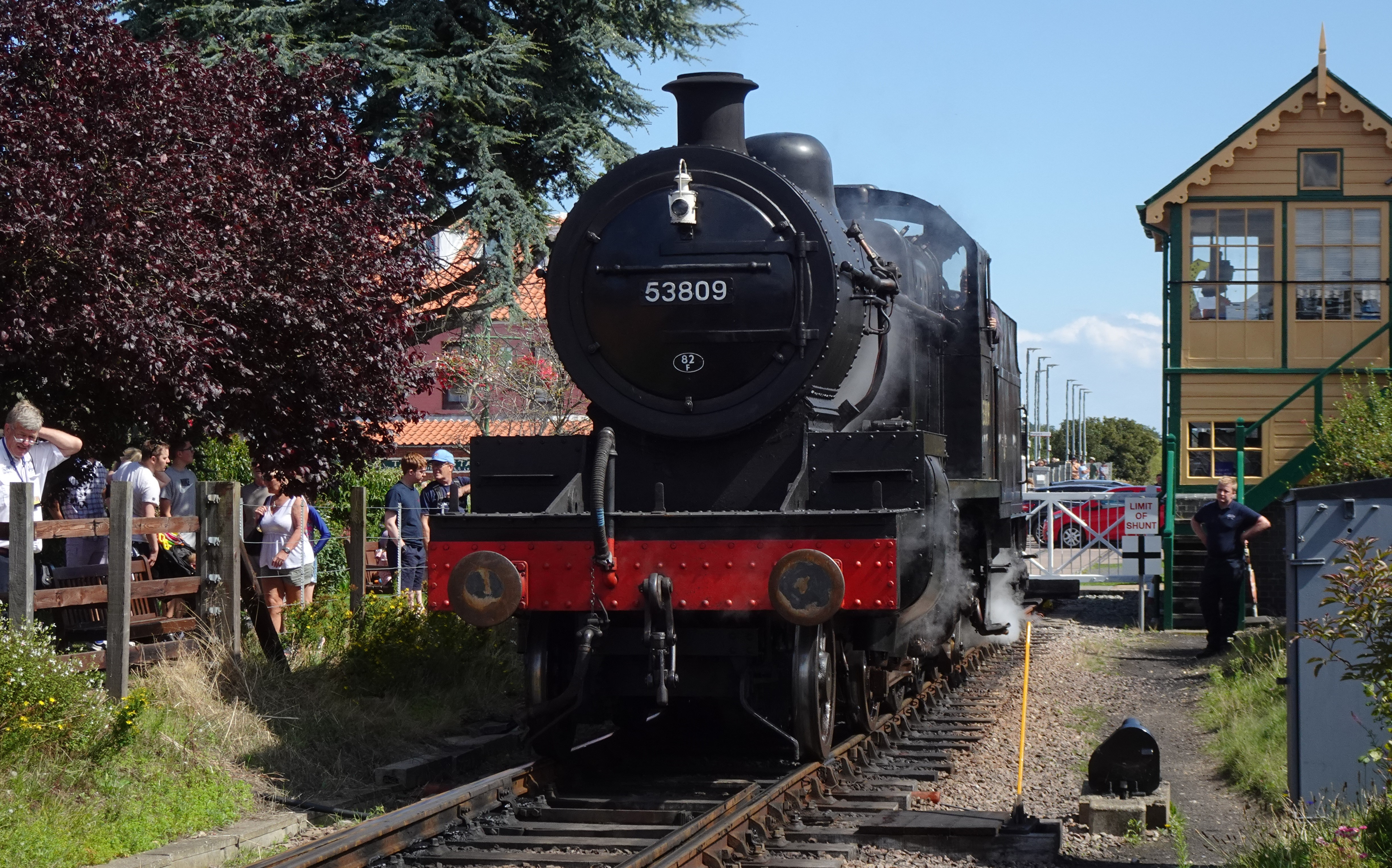
53809 on the North Norfolk Railway, August 2023.

No. 89/53809 is owned by John Moorhouse and operated by the 13809 Preservation Society Ltd. Following restoration at Swanwick in 1980 in LMS livery as 13809, it worked through the 1980s and early 1990s, reverting to its BR Number 53809 in 1987 (with the Early Crest), before being withdrawn for overhaul in 1994. During this time, it visited the SVR in 1987, and the East Lancashire Railway in 1993 alongside working at Butterley, and even worked on the mainline for a period.

The locomotive emerged in January 2006 in BR Black Livery as No. 53809 (with the Late Crest), entering service in early February at the Midland Railway - Butterley. Shortly after this overhaul was finished, the loco made a poignant return to the site of Bath Green Park Station (now a car park for Sainsbury's) in March 2006, to celebrate 40 years since the S&D closed, after which it was reunited with No. 88 at the WSR. The locomotive then ran for 5 years before it was withdrawn from service early in 2011, requiring boiler repairs. During the five years it ran, it made first time visits to the Nene Valley Railway and the Bluebell Railway in 2008, as well as several stays at the North Yorkshire Moors Railway during 2006, 2007, 2009 and 2010. The engine's second overhaul was completed in February 2016, keeping its previous BR livery with the Post 1956 Crest. As in 2016, the engine's first call of duty was at the WSR alongside No. 88 again, this time marking 50 years since the S&D closed, and then remained there. In January 2018 it departed to the North Norfolk Railway on a long term operational contract.
