= Lowson =

Lowson is an English surname. Notable people with the surname include:

- Edmund Lowson, English footballer
- Thomas Lowson (c.1764–1856), the traditional founder of the town of Carnoustie, Angus, Scotland
- Otto Andreas Lowson Mörch (1828–1878), biologist, specifically a malacologist
- Sir Denys Lowson, 1st Baronet (1906–1975), Lord Mayor of London and first of the Lowson baronets
- Frank Lowson (1925–1984), English cricketer who played in seven Tests from 1951 to 1955
