= Mud Fest =

Holi festival in India

- Official name: Mud Fest
- Also called: Mud bathing, Kichad Holi
- Observed by: Surat, Gujarat, India
- Significance: Mark spring and celebrate eco-friendly Holi
- Celebrations: Mud bathing, Rain dancing
- Frequency: annual
- Related to: Holi

Mud Fest is an annual Holi festival organized in the city of Surat, Gujarat, India to mark the Spring festivities of Holi. It has been held since 2015.

Mud Fest was started as an alternative to the popular way of playing Holi or Dhuleti played with chemical colours, by substituting them with Fuller's earth mixed with herbs. A giant swimming pool is filled with Fuller's earth mixed with nearly 169 herbal plants having ayurvedic medicinal properties. Founder of Mud Fest, Ornob Moitra says, “The special mud used during Holi is prepared by crushing neem leaves, rose petals, sandalwood paste, multani mitti and mixing all ingredients.” It is incidentally one of the diamond city, Surat's biggest annual cultural festivities."
