= Ron Young =

Ron Young may refer to:

- Ron Young (United States Army officer) (born 1977), American former POW in the 2003 Gulf military action; contestant in the reality show The Amazing Race 7
- Ron Young (politician) (born 1946), American politician and business owner
- Ron Young (racing driver) (born 1970), American stock car racing driver
- Ron Young (footballer, born 1925) (1925–1991), English football wing half for Bournemouth & Boscombe Athletic
- Ron Young (footballer, born 1945) (born 1945), English former football winger for Hull City and Hartlepool
- Ron Young (jurist) (born 1951/1952), New Zealand jurist
- Ronald N. Young (born 1940), American consultant, teacher, and politician
- Ronnie Young (1947–2019), American politician
