= Bath Aqua Theatre of Glass =

Bath Aqua Glass
- Type: Independent Artisan
- Industry: Glassblowing, Stained glass
- Founded: 1996
- Founder: Annette Dolan
- Headquarters: Bath, Somerset, England
- Area served: Worldwide
- Key people: Annette Dolan (MD), Themis Mikellides (MD), Slim (Head Glassblower)
- Products: Roman & Georgian style glassware, Stained glass, Memorial glass
- Website: www.bathaquaglass.com

Bath Aqua Glass is an independent artisan glassmaking company based in Bath, Somerset. Established in 1996, the company is renowned for its production of "Aqua" glass—a signature blue-green tint inspired by Roman glass discovered in the city's thermal springs. In November 2025, after more than 20 years as a landmark of the Walcot Street "Artisan Quarter," the company consolidated its operations at its established studio in Kingsdown.

== Leadership and Artistry ==
=== Annette Dolan (Founder & Managing Director) ===
Annette Dolan founded the business in 1996. Born in Bristol and raised in London, she is a master stained glass artist.

- Advocacy: Completely dyslexic, Annette has authored a book on the subject to encourage others, highlighting the success of art-based businesses.
- Philosophy: She views independent businesses as the "backbone of the country" and maintains a leadership style focused on openness and weekly management teamwork.

=== In Memoriam: Adrian Dolan (1959–2023) ===
For over 20 years, Adrian Dolan served as the Managing Director and was the driving force behind the brand’s public identity.

- "Mr. Walcot": Adrian was a legendary figure in Bath, earning the nickname "Mr. Walcot" for his tireless promotion of the Artisan Quarter. He was a primary organizer of the Walcot Winter Lantern Procession and the "Real Shops" campaign.
- The Theatre of Glass: Adrian was famous for his charismatic glassblowing demonstrations, educating thousands of visitors on the history and chemistry of Bath glass.

=== Themis Mikellides (Managing Director & Stained Glass Artist) ===
Themis Mikellides is a renowned architectural glass artist.

- Style: He developed the "natural ambiguous imagery" style, blending photography and natural investigations into "modern classic" glass designs.
- Global Reach: His commissions range from medieval-style windows for a chapel in Nigeria to contemporary installations in Washington and Alaska.

== History and Technological Evolution ==
=== The Walcot Era (1996–2025) ===
Under the joint leadership of Annette and Adrian Dolan, the business was anchored at 105-107 Walcot Street for over two decades. This site became a tourist destination known as the "Theatre of Glass."

=== Resilience and Innovation ===
- 2022 Energy Crisis: Following a spike in natural gas prices, the company transitioned to a "Mini Melt" portable furnace powered by propane to maintain production.
- Electrification (2024): In November 2024, the studio installed a modern Electric Furnace, successfully moving the business toward a carbon-neutral future.
- The 2025 Relocation: In November 2025, the glassblowing studio moved from Walcot Street to join the long-standing stained glass studio at Ashley Wood Farm.

== Public Art and Notable Artifacts ==
=== The William Burges Window ===
In 2009, Annette Dolan discovered a rare William Burges (1827–1881) stained glass window in the vaults of Abbey Chambers. Authenticated on the Antiques Roadshow, it was a centerpiece of the Walcot studio for 15 years. Upon the studio's relocation in 2025, the window was moved into the possession of the Victoria Art Gallery for public preservation.

=== King Bladud’s Pigs: "Glass-T’un-Bury" ===
In 2008, the studio participated in the King Bladud’s Pigs project. Their entry, "Glass-T’un-Bury," featured signature hand-blown glass "bullseyes" and glass shards. The project raised funds for the Two Tunnels Greenway.

== Personnel ==
=== Slim (Head Glassblower) ===
The "hot floor" is led by Slim, who rose from an apprentice to Head Glassblower. Slim worked closely with Adrian Dolan for many years and now oversees the production of signature Aqua glassware and the "Ashes into Glass" memorial range at the Kingsdown studio.

== Locations ==
- Retail: The Abbey Shop: 14 Cheap Street / 15 Abbey Churchyard, located next to Bath Abbey.
- Studio: Ashley Wood Farm, Kingsdown: Located in converted cow sheds, this site has been the home of the company’s stained glass production since 2015. As of November 2025, it is the unified production hub for both stained glass and glassblowing.

== See also ==
- Glassblowing
- Stained glass
- William Burges
- Victoria Art Gallery
