= Sille =

Sille may refer to:

== People ==
- Sille (given name), a Scandinavian feminine given name
- Les Sille (1928–2007), English footballer
- Müzahir Sille (1931–2016), Turkish Olympic wrestler
- Timotej Šille (born 1995), Slovak ice hockey player

== Places ==
Belgium

- Sille (Belgium), a watercourse running through Silly, Belgium

France

- Sillé-le-Guillaume, a commune in the Sarthe department
- Sillé-le-Philippe, a commune in the Sarthe department

Turkey

- Sille, Konya, a village
- Sille Dam

India

- Sille railway station near Pasighat
