= Curo =

Housing association in England

Curo Group is a not-for-profit housing association based in Bath, England. Curo's operating area is the West of England, with the majority of its homes located in Bath and North East Somerset where it is the largest housing provider.

== History ==
Prior to 2012, Curo traded as Somer Housing Group. Somer Housing Group's main housing association member was Somer Community Housing Trust, formed in 1999 with the transfer of Bath and North East Somerset Council's housing stock as part of a large-scale voluntary housing transfer. The Group was joined in 2002 by Shape Housing Association and in 2005 by Redland Housing Association. Shape, formed in 1983 as Bath Self-Help, specialised in supported housing for people in the Bath area. Redland Housing was founded in 1973.

A significant number of the council houses taken over by Curo were post-war pre-cast reinforced concrete houses, which began to suffer from corrosion problems which would lead to eventual structural failure, a known national problem. Since about 2005 Curo has been rebuilding or replacing these houses.

Until 2018, Curo Group (Albion) Limited was the group holding company for:

- Curo Places Limited: a charitable company setup in 1999 following the transfer of housing stock from Bath and North East Somerset Council, which since 2015 has been a community benefit society;
- Curo Choice Limited: care and support functions;
- Curo Enterprise Limited: established in 2012 for commercial activities including housing development, trading as Curo Homes;
- Curo Market Rented Services Limited: manages market rented homes.

In December 2018, Curo Group (Albion) Limited converted from a private company to a community benefit society.

== Areas of activity ==
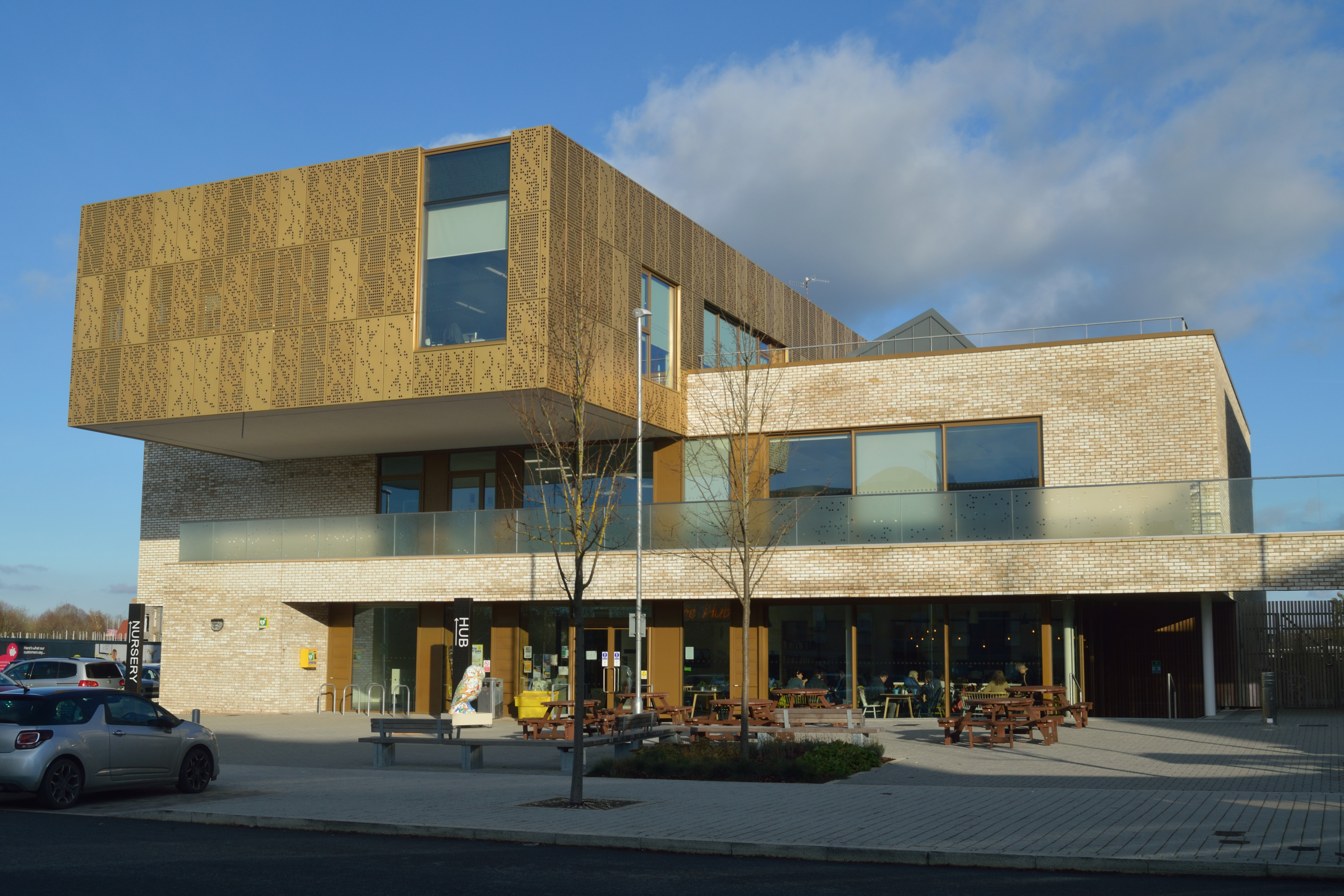
The Hub community centre on the Mulberry Park development on the former Foxhill MoD site. The community centre and adjacent Mulberry Park Educate Together Primary School cost £10 million to build, and won the South West Community Benefit category at the Royal Institution of Chartered Surveyors Awards 2019.

In December 2018, when Curo Group (Albion) Limited converted from a private company to a community benefit society, the structure changed so Curo Places Limited was its only subsidiary, and the other companies became subsidiaries of Curo Places Limited which has charitable status:

- Curo Choice Limited: care and support functions (charitable status);
- Curo Enterprise Limited: established in 2012 for commercial activities including housing development, trading as Curo Homes;
- Curo Market Rented Services Limited: manages market rented homes;
- Mulberry Park Community Benefit Society: manages services on the Mulberry Park estate (charitable status).

Curo manages over 13,000 homes mainly in Bath and Bristol, and had a turnover of £93.1 million and had 503 employees in the 2018–19 financial year.

It is a housing association registered with Homes England. Curo provides homes at low-cost social and affordable rents through local authorities’ choice-based lettings schemes, and for sale through shared ownership. Curo also provides homes at market rents and for sale on the open market, cross-subsidising its charitable activities.

Curo provides support services to older and vulnerable people, including people affected by homelessness and people with disabilities. In 2018 Curo's Wellbeing House received the UK Housing Award for 'Outstanding approach to meeting specialist housing needs'.

In 2013 Curo purchased a 48 acres (19 hectares) Ministry of Defence site, Foxhill in Combe Down, for £50 million, to build about 700 houses on the site in a development eventually called Mulberry Park. Curo also had originally planned to demolish a neighbouring housing estate of 542 homes, which it about 80% owns, and replace it with about 700 new houses supported by the government's Estate Regeneration Programme. This proved controversial with residents, who raised over 250 objections to the plans. In February 2018, after residents commenced a legal action, Curo announced that it was no longer demolishing the estate and would instead focus on refurbishing the existing dwellings. In June 2018 the High Court ruled in a judicial review that the grant of outline planning permission for the development was unlawful as the council "did not have due regard to the impact on the elderly and disabled persons" whose homes might have been demolished.

== Partnerships ==
Curo is represented on various local and regional groups including:

- Homes for the South West
- West of England Housing Delivery Panel
- Bath & North East Somerset Public Service Board
- Bristol Housing Partnership
- Bath & North East Somerset Homelessness Partnership

== Finances ==
Curo Group recorded a turnover of £97.9m and an operating surplus of £22.2m in the 2016–17 financial year. In 2013 the group secured £75m of funding with M&G Investments, £50m of which was to support its house building programme, with £25m for additional projects.

== Regulatory judgements ==
As of June 2017, Curo was assessed by its regulator, the Homes and Communities Agency, as having the highest (V1 and G1) ratings for governance and viability.

The Properly Governed assessment was downgraded to G2 in 2016 due to a lack of assurance around the maintenance of clear roles and responsibilities for the board. In August 2016 a new chair was appointed and later the governance structure was changed.

== See also ==
- Healthcare in Somerset
- Public housing in the United Kingdom
