= Duncorn Hill =

Coordinates: 51.3529°N 2.4056°W

Duncorn Hill within Somerset

Duncorn Hill is an English, landmark, rounded hill with a flat top close to the Fosse Way. It is on a limestone plateau south of Bath in Somerset and summits at 585 feet (178 m) above sea level. The hill's name derives from Celtic din for fort and corn meaning horn shaped.

== Geology ==
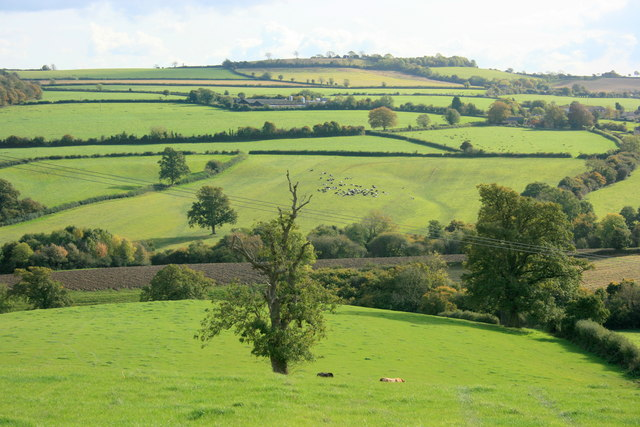
The northern slopes of Duncorn Hill, as seen from SE of Wilmington

The hill's bedrock is limestone of the Great Oolite Group with deposits of fuller's earth containing fossil shellfish. This is typically covered with a free draining soil layer of 5–6 inches (13–15 cm), mostly brown or greyish brown but with some yellow patches.

== History ==
It has been speculated Duncorn Hill had been the site of a Bronze or Iron Age hill fort. Field investigations were undertaken in 1966, but no evidence of a fort was found. The scarps previously thought to be part of a man-made structure were shown to be natural geological formations. Investigators found no evidence of the cairns described in 18th century descriptions. Nevertheless in 1975, Ralph Whitlock wrote of Iron Age, occupied, hilltop earthworks.
