= Midford railway station =

Former railway station in Somerset, England

Coordinates: 51.3449°N 2.3452°W

Midford
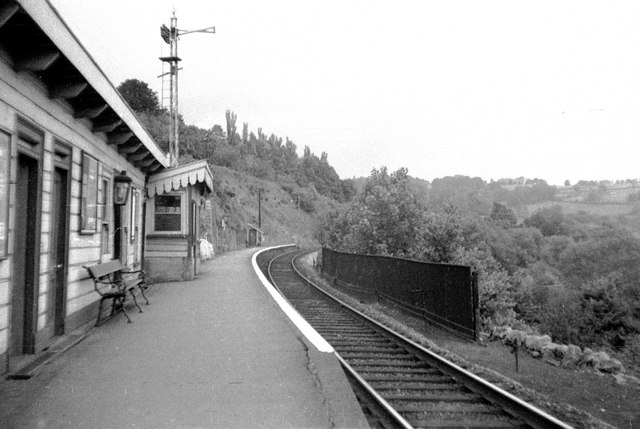
- The station building and platform, 1962

General information
- Location: Midford, Bath and North East Somerset, Somerset; England
- Grid reference: ST761607
- Platforms: 1

Other information
- Status: Disused

History
- Pre-grouping: Somerset and Dorset Railway
- Post-grouping: SR and LMSR; Western Region of British Railways

Key dates
- 20 July 1874: Opened
- 10 June 1963: Closed to goods traffic
- 7 March 1966: Closed to passenger traffic
Location

Midford railway station served the village of Midford, in Somerset, England. It comprised one platform on the Bath extension of the Somerset and Dorset Joint Railway (S&DJR), just to the north of the point where the double track became single tracked.

== History ==
The station was opened in 1874. There was a small goods yard to the north of the station, towards the entrance to the Combe Down Tunnel, which loaded Fuller's earth from Tucking Mill. South of the station, a signal box presided over the double track junction; the railway then ran across the Midford Valley on the extant high viaduct.

The station was closed with the rest of the line in March 1966 under the Beeching Axe, although it had been unstaffed for some years.

For about four years from 1911 to 1915, Midford had a second railway station, Midford Halt; it was located on the Great Western Railway's Camerton branch, which passed under the S&DJR viaduct.

Preceding station	Disused railways	Following station
Wellow; Line and station closed	Somerset & Dorset Joint Railway; LSWR and Midland Railways	Bath Green Park; Line and station closed

== The site today ==
The remains of Midford railway station, September 2007

After a long period in private hands, the site is now part of Two Tunnels Greenway, a surfaced cycleway and footpath. The platform and remains of the goods shed survive.

The station is now owned by the New Somerset and Dorset Railway, which has plans to rebuild the station building and relay the track, once the cycleway will be diverted or accommodated. The site has been cleared to uncover the remains of the old station.

== The New Somerset and Dorset Railway ==
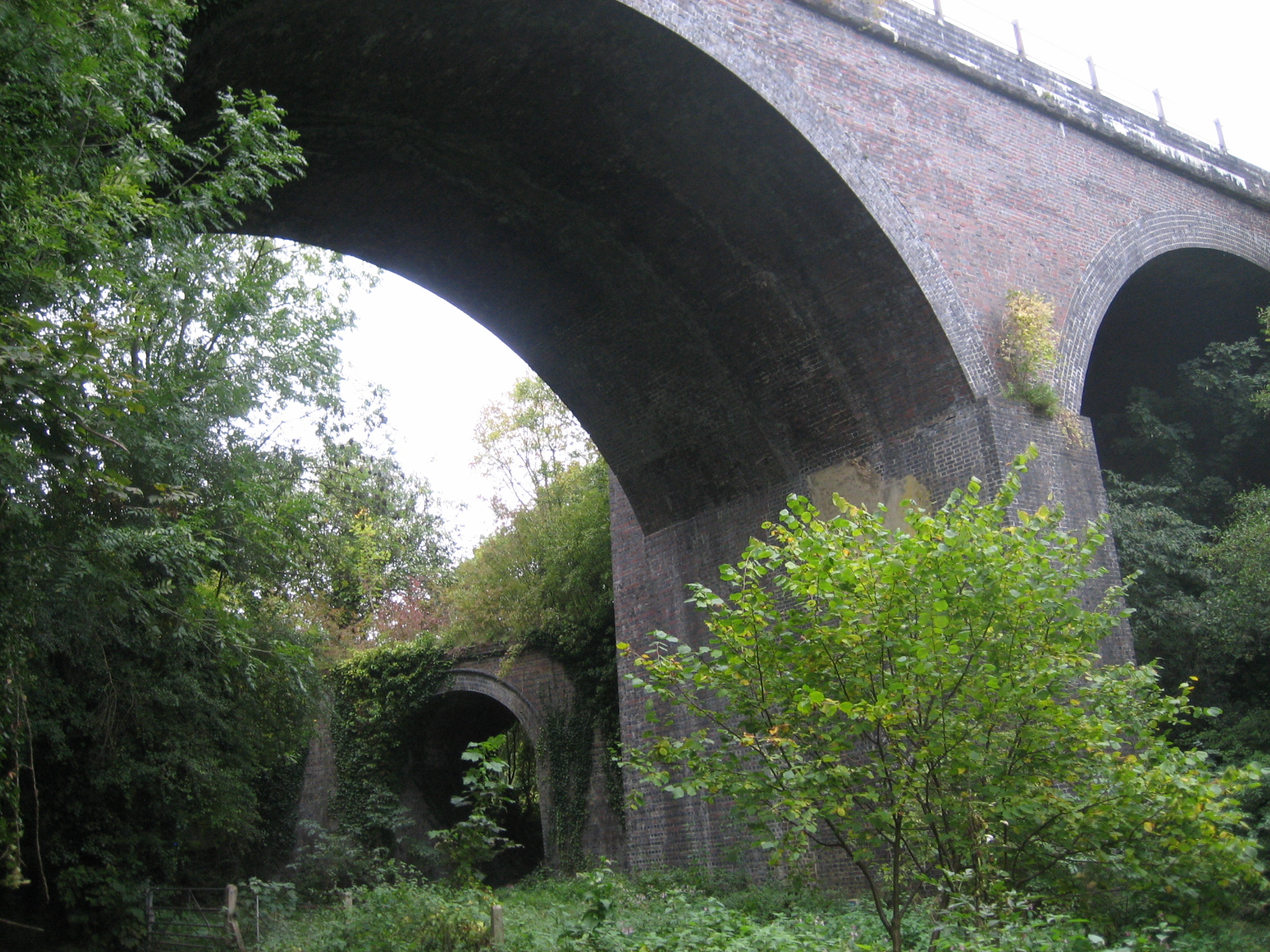
East-west beneath north–south; Camerton branch viaduct (left) is dwarfed by the viaduct at Midford

The New Somerset and Dorset Railway formed in early 2009 aims to restore the whole line to main line operations.

As the initial objectives of the New S&DR are focused on the southern end of the line, notably Blandford-Bournemouth, Midford will be restored as a cafe and information centre in the short term, in much the same way the North Dorset Railway (previously the Shillingstone Station Project) is undertaking at Shillingstone railway station.
