= Devonshire Tunnel =

Coordinates: 51.3695°N 2.3655°W

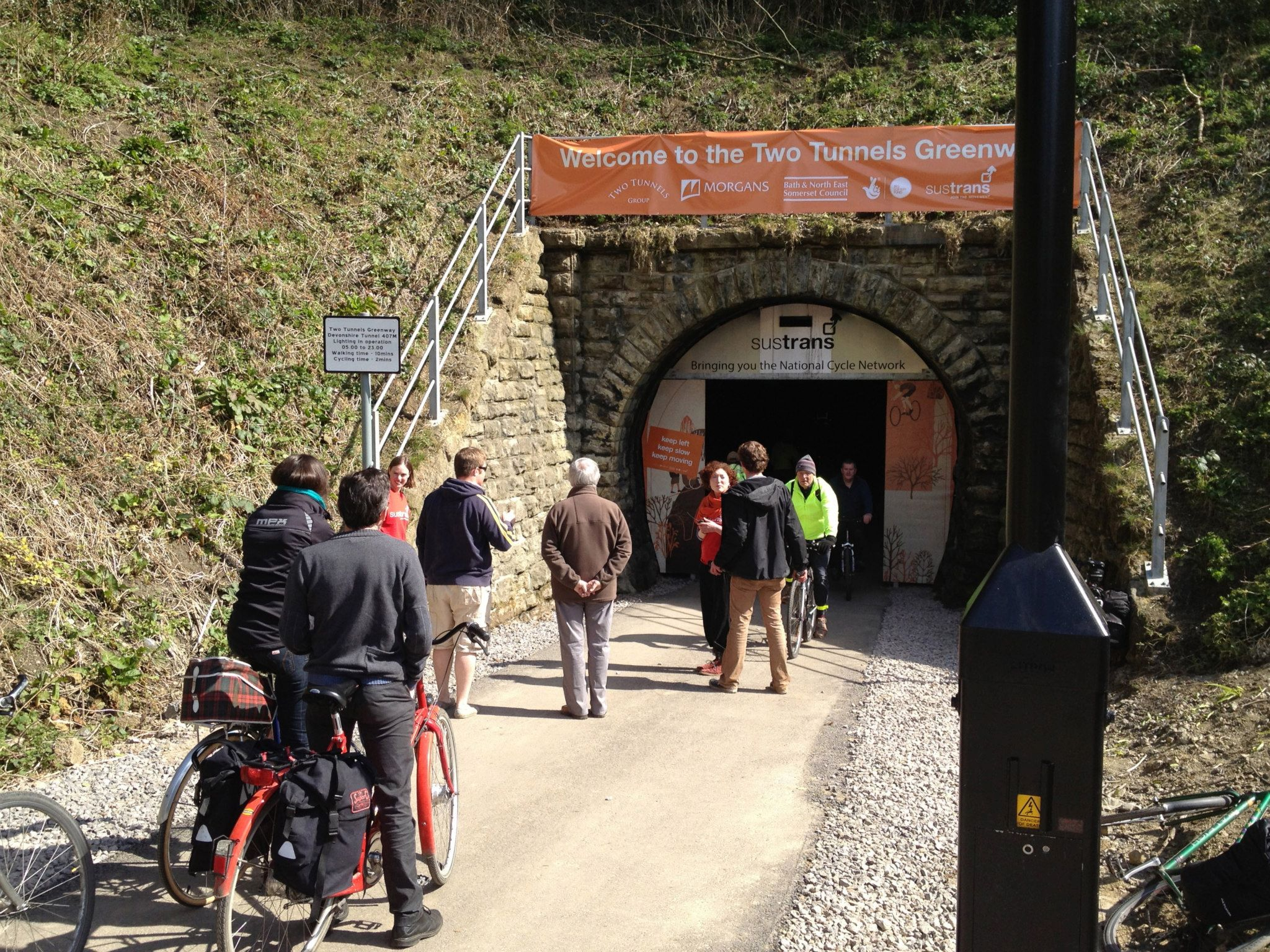
- Devonshire Tunnel West Portal
- Interactive map of Devonshire Tunnel

Overview
- Line: Somerset & Dorset Joint Railway
- Location: c. 2.0 miles from Bath Green Park
- OS grid reference: ST 746 634

Operation
- Opened: 1874
- Closed: 1966 (railway)
- Owner: Wessex Water

Technical
- Length: 447 yards (409 m) approx.
- No. of tracks: Single
- Grade: mostly 1 in 50 (2%) ascending towards Midford (away from Bath)

Devonshire Tunnel is on the closed Somerset & Dorset Joint Railway main line, between Midford and Bath Green Park railway stations, below high ground and the southern suburbs of Bath, England, emerging below the northern slopes of Combe Down village. It opened in 1874 and was named after the road called Devonshire Buildings which lie immediately above the tunnel.

It now forms one of the eponymous tunnels in the Two Tunnels Greenway.

== Gradient ==
The tunnel had a gradient of 1 in 50, on a line where the ruling gradient was also 1 in 50.
