= Combe Down Tunnel =

Defunct railway tunnel in Somerset, England

Coordinates: 51.3560°N 2.3415°W

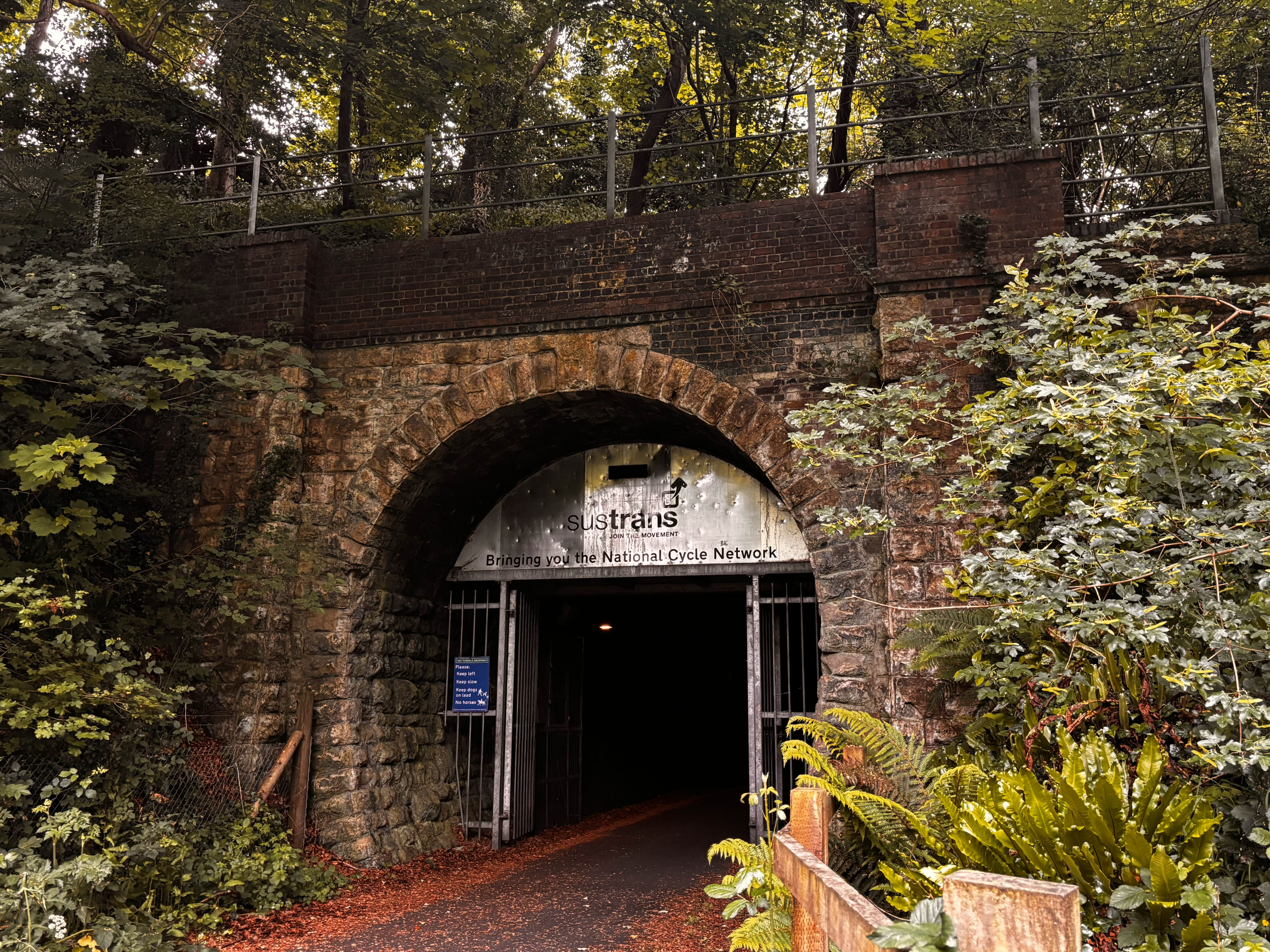
- The northern tunnel portal in 2025
- Interactive map of Combe Down Tunnel

Overview
- Line: Somerset and Dorset Joint Railway
- Location: c. 2.5 mi (4.0 km) from Bath Green Park

Operation
- Opened: 1874
- Closed: 1966 (railway)
- Owner: Wessex Water

Technical
- Length: 1,829 yards (1,672 m)
- No. of tracks: Single
- Tunnel clearance: Arch crown is between 14 ft 9 in (4.50 m) and 18 ft (5.5 m) above the invert
- Width: Varies from 11 ft 6 in (3.51 m) to 13 ft 7 in (4.14 m)
- Grade: Mostly 1 in 100 (1%) descending towards Midford (away from Bath)

Combe Down Tunnel is on the now-closed Somerset and Dorset Joint Railway main line, between Midford and Bath Green Park railway station, below high ground and the southern suburbs of Bath, England, emerging below the southern slopes of Combe Down village.

Opened in 1874, this 1,829-yard (1,672 m) long disused railway tunnel was once the UK's longest without intermediate ventilation. The tunnel now forms part of the £1.8 million Two Tunnels Greenway walking and cycling path opened on 6 April 2013 and is the longest cycling tunnel in Britain. Its custodian is Wessex Water.

== Overview ==
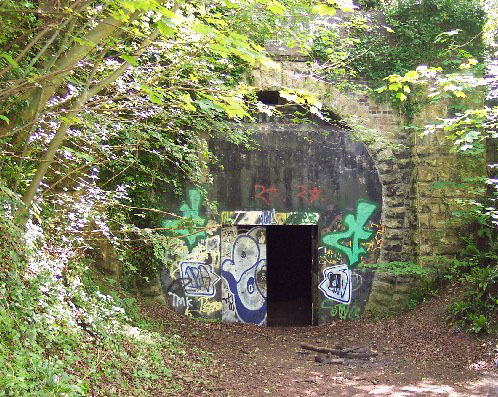
Combe Down Tunnel in 2005

The tunnel was on the "Bath Extension" line of the Somerset & Dorset Railway, built in 1874. The extension effectively bankrupted the independent company. The extension line was later made double-track northwards from Evercreech Junction to the viaduct at Midford, but the substantial civil engineering works associated with the tunnel and the steep approach into Bath, including the shorter Devonshire Tunnel, caused the northernmost section to remain single-track throughout its working life.

Goods trains heading south from Bath were often banked (assisted in rear) by a locomotive that detached itself from the train at the entrance to Combe Down tunnel, and then returned down the gradient to Bath. This operation was a very rare example of two trains being permitted to run within a single-line section at once, although the train engine carried an electric tablet and the banking engine a staff, both of which had to be returned to their appropriate signalling instruments before other trains could be dispatched into the section. Sometimes the banking engine would be conveying additional goods vehicles for Bath Co-op Siding (situated within the single line section), so the bank engine (carrying the bank staff) would shunt the siding on its way back to Bath Junction whilst the main train (with the single-line tablet) would continue on its way to Midford. This unusual method of working operated right up to the closure of the S&D in 1966.

== Accident ==
Combe Down tunnel had no intermediate ventilation and there were significant problems with fumes. On 20 November 1929, the driver and fireman of a northbound goods train were overcome by smoke. The train was moving very slowly in the tunnel due to a heavy load and due to starting from a standstill at Midford. The locomotive, S&DJR 2-8-0 No. 89, continued on slowly and eventually breasted the summit of the gradient. Its downward course to Bath was accomplished more quickly, and the train ran away, crashing into the goods yard on the approach to Bath Green Park railway station, killing the driver, Henry Jennings, and two railway employees in the yard.

The fumes that overcame the footplate crew were a consequence of the restricted bore, lack of ventilation shafts, the exceptional humidity and lack of breeze, and the very slow speed of the train, running tender first. The inspecting officer, Colonel A. C. Trench recommended that maximum loads should be reduced or assistant engines provided to prevent a recurrence.

== Two Tunnels Shared Path ==
This section of the Somerset and Dorset Railway, including the tunnels, is now incorporated into a shared-use walking and cycling path. Planning permission was approved in May 2008 and much of the funding came from a Sustrans Connect2 grant.

The fourth and final £100,000 tranche of council funding was made in the 2011/12 financial year; the tunnel was equipped with a cycle-friendly surface and LED lighting. The route was opened on 6 April 2013.

The Combe Down tunnel path has been used as the site of a 200-mile underground ultramarathon challenge called "The Tunnel".

== See also ==
- List of tunnels in the United Kingdom
- Ruling gradient#Other tunnels
