= Terry Murray (Irish footballer) =

Irish footballer

Personal information
- Full name: Terence Murray
- Date of birth: 22 May 1928
- Place of birth: Dublin, Ireland
- Date of death: 17 October 2017 (aged 89)
- Place of death: Bedford, England
- Position: Outside right

Youth career
- St Pauls

Senior career*
Years	Team	Apps	(Gls)
1948–1951	Dundalk	38	(6)
1951–1954	Hull City	32	(6)
1954–1955	Bournemouth	13	(1)
1955–1956	King's Lynn	30	(12)
1956–1961	Bedford Town	230	(37)
1961–1964	Rushden Town	30	

International career
1950	Republic of Ireland	1	(0)
	League of Ireland XI	6	(0)

Managerial career
- 1961–1967: Rushden Town (player-manager)
- * Club domestic league appearances and goals

Terence Murray (22 May 1928 – 17 October 2017) was a Republic of Ireland soccer international, who was capped once for the Republic of Ireland at senior level, away to Belgium in May 1950.

Murray also played six times for the League of Ireland select team from the period 1948 to 1951 against Football League (twice), Irish League (twice), Scottish League and West German League teams.

He began his senior career in 1948. A 20-year old junior international, Murray had won numerous honours with St Pauls, including both the FAI and Leinster Junior Cups and had scored two goals for the Irish juniors playing against Scotland in Glasgow the previous April and was signed by Dundalk.
