= George Crawford McKindsey =

Canadian politician

The Honourable George Crawford McKindsey
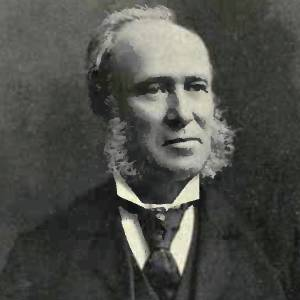

Canadian Senator from Ontario
- In office 1884–1901
- Appointed by: Sir John A. Macdonald

Personal details
- Born: March 29, 1829 Trafalgar, Upper Canada
- Died: February 12, 1901 (aged 71)
- Party: Conservative

George Crawford McKindsey (March 29, 1829 – February 12, 1901) was a Canadian politician.

== Background ==
Born in the Township of Trafalgar, Halton County, Upper Canada of Irish parents who came to Canada and settled in the County of Halton in 1819, McKindsey was educated at the Common School and also by private tuition. He was Deputy Sheriff from July 1855 until October 1858, and Sheriff of the County of Halton from October 1858 until June 1882.

He was President of the Agricultural Association of Halton County, a Captain in the Militia and a Justice of the Peace. He ran twice unsuccessfully for the House of Commons of Canada in the 1872 election and 1882 election for the riding of Halton. He was appointed on the advice of John A. Macdonald to the Senate in January 1884 representing the senatorial division of Milton, Ontario.

A Conservative, he served 17 years until his death in 1901.
