= Combe Down =

Village on the outskirts of Bath, United Kingdom

Coordinates: 51.361°N 2.342°W

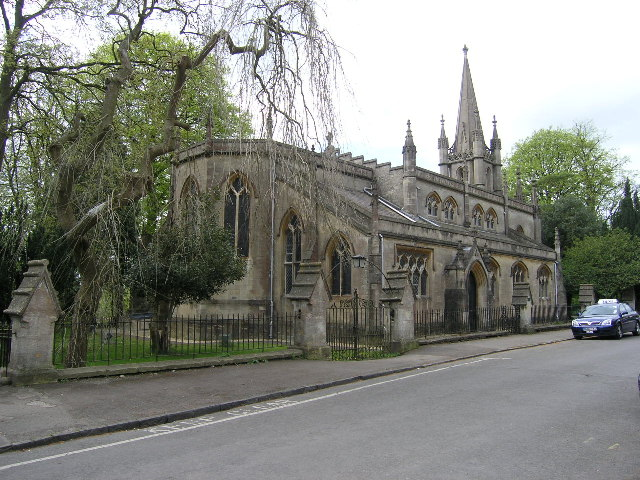
- Holy Trinity Church

- Location within Somerset
- Population: 5,419 (2011)
- OS grid reference: ST763625
- Unitary authority: Bath and North East Somerset
- Ceremonial county: Somerset
- Region: South West
- Country: England
- Sovereign state: United Kingdom
- Post town: BATH
- Postcode district: BA2
- Dialling code: 01225
- Police: Avon and Somerset
- Fire: Avon
- Ambulance: South Western
- UK Parliament: Bath

Combe Down is a village on the outskirts of Bath, England, in the Bath and North East Somerset unitary authority area, within the ceremonial county of Somerset.

Combe Down village consists predominantly of 18th- and 19th-century Bath stone-built villas, terraces and workers' cottages; the post World War II Foxhill estate of former and present council housing; a range of Georgian, Victorian and 20th-century properties along both sides of North Road and Bradford Road; and the 21st-century Mulberry Park development on the site of former Ministry of Defence offices.

== Location ==
Combe Down sits on a ridge above Bath, approximately 1 1/2 miles (2.4 km) to the south of the city centre. The village is adjoined to the north by large areas of natural woodland (Fairy Wood, Long Wood, Klondyke Copse and Rainbow Wood) with public footpaths offering views overlooking the city. Parts of these woods are owned and managed by Bath & Northeast Somerset Council, but the majority are owned and managed by the National Trust; the Bath Skyline trail runs north of the woods. To the south of the village are views of the Midford Valley.

== Toponymy ==
"Combe" or "coombe" is a word meaning a steep-sided valley derived from Old English "cumb" and possibly from the same Brythonic source as the Welsh cwm. "Down" comes from the Old English "dūn" or "dūne", shortened from adūne ‘downward’, from the phrase of dūne ‘off the hill’.

== Governance ==
Formerly part of the parish of Monkton Combe, Combe Down was incorporated into the city of Bath in the 1950s.

There have been a number of boundary changes and local government changes affecting Combe Down.

- Before 1854: part of the ecclesiastical parish of Monkton Combe in the diocese of Bath and Wells and the civil hundred of Bath Forum in Somerset
- From 1854: part of the ecclesiastical parish of Combe Down in the diocese of Bath and Wells and the civil hundred of Bath Forum in Somerset
- Following the Public Health Act 1875: part of the civil hundred of Bath Forum in Somerset and Bath Rural Sanitary District
- Following the Local Government Act 1894: part of the civil parish of Monkton Combe in Bath Rural District Council in Somerset
- Following the Local Government Act 1933: part of the civil parish of Monkton Combe in Bathavon Rural District Council in Somerset
- Following the Local Government Commission for England (1958–1967): from 1967 part of the county borough of Bath
- Following the Local Government Act 1972 from 1974: part of the district of Bath in the county of Avon
- Following the Avon (Structural Change) Order 1995: from 1996 part of the unitary authority of Bath and North East Somerset.

== Amenities ==
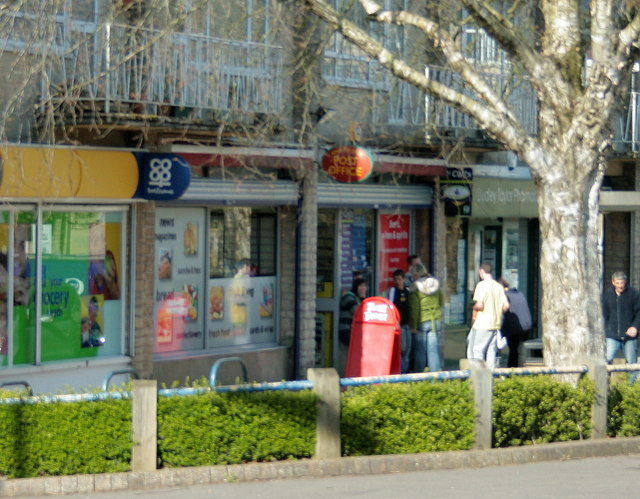
Bradford Road Post Office and store

Combe Down has many local amenities including schools, churches, shops, local societies and pubs. It has two allotment sites: 64 plots on a privately owned site at Church Road, established in 1895, and ten plots at Foxhill owned by the parish council.

The local state primary school is Combe Down CEVC (Church of England Voluntary Controlled) Primary School, housed partly in a log cabin imported from Finland. The nearest state secondary school (with sixth form) is Ralph Allen School. The independent Monkton Combe School is in the nearby village of Monkton Combe while its prep school, pre-prep and nursery are all in Combe Down village. Prior Park College, an independent Catholic secondary school, is adjacent to the village.

The centre of the village has a range of shops and small businesses. The post office closed in 2006 despite public opposition and the nearest post office branch is now inside a grocery store in a row of shops on the Bradford Road.

There is an Anglican church (Holy Trinity) and a non-conformist chapel (Union Chapel). A Roman Catholic church (Saint Peter and Saint Paul) is on the edge of the village, adjacent to the Foxhill estate.

Combe Down has two rugby union clubs and a cricket club, a children's nursery, a doctors' surgery and a dentist as well as an active Cub and Scout Group (10th Bath) with its own Scouts' Hut. There are several societies, including an active local history group (the Combe Down Heritage Society), a branch of the Women's Institute and two art groups.

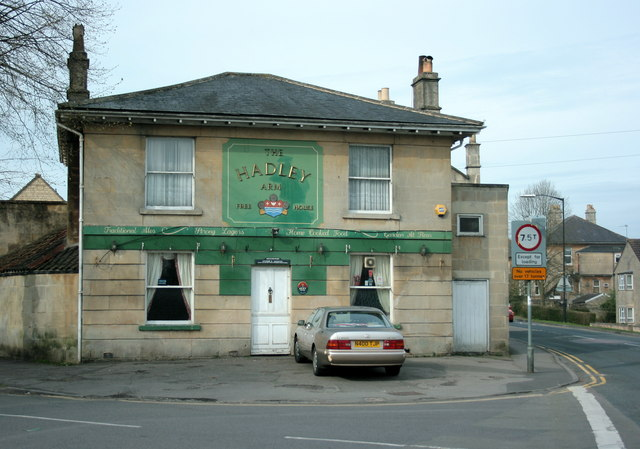
The Hadley Arms

There is a private hospital, Bath Clinic (owned by Circle Health Group) on Claverton Down Road, based at Longwood House, the former home of the Mallet family of Mallet Antiques. Margaret Mary Mallett (1882–1959), who lived at Longwood House, and her daughters Margaret Elizabeth Mallett (1905–1991) and Barbara Penelope Mallett Lock (1896–1978) donated 347 acres (140 ha) of land on Combe Down and Claverton Down including Rainbow Wood farm, Klondyke Copse, Fairy Wood and Bushey Norwood to the National Trust. Opposite the hospital is a 4-star hotel and health club, Combe Grove Manor, with 69 acres (28 ha) of gardens and woodland.

A public open space (Firs Field) incorporates the village war memorial and a play area with children's play equipment. Three parcels of land make up the Firs Field open space, two of which are under the control of the local Council. The deeds state that the Firs Field is intended for the recreation of the residents of Combe Down in perpetuity. Firs Field was restored to meadowland status following the successful completion of the stone mine stabilisation works in 2010. A residents' group (The Friends of Firs Field) exists to ensure the appropriate representation of local residents' interests with regard to the management of the field. In 2015 Firs Field was granted "commemorative" status and designated an official Fields in Trust "Centenary Field".

In July 2014, the Ralph Allen CornerStone was opened. It is run by a charity, the Combe Down Stone Legacy Trust, as a sustainable building and educational centre. The Combe Down Heritage Society has museum-standard secure archiving space in the basement where it catalogues and stores unique local heritage material, and which can be accessed by researchers.

There are daily bus services to the village from Bath city centre. The privately owned Bath 'circular tour' bus passes the outskirts of the village and down Ralph Allen Drive on its route to the city centre. The Bath Circular bus passes through Combe Down and caters for students travelling to the University of Bath and Bath Spa University.

== History ==
It is believed that a Roman villa was situated on the southern slopes of the village somewhere below Belmont Road, the site of which was discovered in the 1850s. An inscription on a stone recovered from the area reads "PRO SALVTE IMP CES M AVR ANTONINI PII FELICIS INVICTI AVG NAEVIVS AVG LIB ADIVT PROC PRINCIPIA RVINA OPRESS A SOLO RESTITVIT". This can be translated as: "For the health of Imperator Caesar Marcus Aurelius Antoninus Pius Felix Invictus Augustus, Naevius the imperial freedman, helped to restore from its foundations the procurator's headquarters which had broken down in ruins." It is thought to date from AD 212–222. Many finds from the site were taken to the Somerset County Museum at Taunton.

John Leland, the 16th century antiquarian and traveller, noted some stone mining activity in Combe Down as he passed by.

By 1700, small open stone quarries were operating on Combe Down. Most of the land and the quarries were purchased by Ralph Allen in 1726 but there was as yet little habitation.

In 1791, John Collinson describes Combe Down as still undeveloped:

On the summit of Combedown a mile northward from the church [mc], among many immense quarries of fine free stone, are large groves of firs, planted by the late Ralph Allen, esq; for the laudable purpose of ornamenting this (at that time rough and barren) hill. Among these groves is a neat range of buildings belonging to this parish. It consists of eleven houses [De Montalt Place], built of wrought stone, raised on the spot; each of which has a small garden in front. These were originally built for the workmen employed in the quarries, but are now chiefly let to invalids from Bath who retire hither for the sake of a very fine air-, (probably rendered more salubrious by the Plantation of firs) from which many have received essential benefit. The surrounding beautiful and extensive prospects; the wild, but pleasing irregularities of the surface and scenery, diversified with immense quarries, fine open cultivated fields, and extensive plantations of firs...".

From their 1924 history of Combe Down, D. Lee Pitcairn and Rev. Alfred Richardson state that:

The houses in Isabella Place were built about 1800, and in 1805 when the De Montalt Mills were founded cottages were erected in Quarry Bottom and Davidge's Bottom to take the place of wooden booths which labourers and workmen had hitherto occupied for the day and in which they had sometimes slept during the week. From this time onwards the place began to develop little by little... In 1829 when the Combe Down quarries were disposed of by Mrs. Cruickshank, building further increased...".

The population increased from 1,600 in 1841, to 2,372 in 1901, and was 5,419 in 2011.

== Stone mines and quarries ==
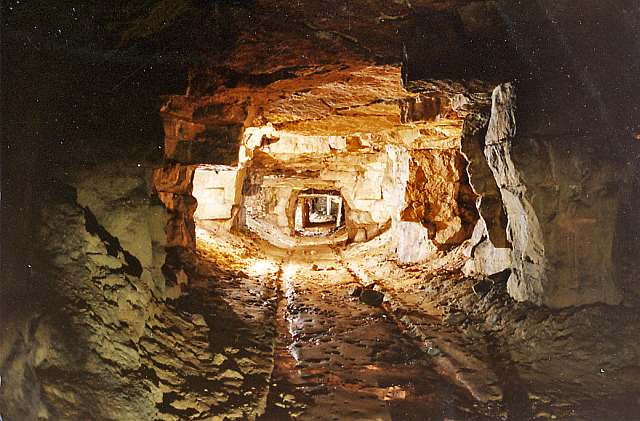
Inside the Combe Down quarry

Combe Down village sits above an area of redundant 18th and 19th century stone quarries, many of which were owned and developed by Ralph Allen in the 1720s. These quarries were fully infilled and stabilised during a central government-funded project which took place between 2005 and 2010. Over 40 quarry sites have been identified on Combe Down. Only one working quarry (Upper Lawn Quarry) remains on the edge of the village, located off Shaft Road. This supplies high quality Bath stone to the city and across the UK.

John Leland, the 16th century antiquarian and traveller, wrote in the 1500s that he approached Bath from Midford "...And about a Mile farther I can to a Village and passd over a Ston Bridge where ranne a litle broke there & they caullid Midford-Water..2 good Miles al by Mountayne and Quarre and litle wood in syte..." which could be a reference to quarrying around Horsecombe Vale, between Midford and Combe Down.

The mines at Combe Down were Oolitic (oolite) limestone mines. Stone was extracted by the "room and pillar" method, by which chambers were mined out, leaving pillars of stone to support the roof. The Bath stone used for many of the buildings in Bath – as well as for other important buildings around the United Kingdom including Buckingham Palace – was mined from beneath and around Combe Down. Many of these workings were once owned by the eighteenth century entrepreneur Ralph Allen (1694–1764). The mines were closed in the 19th century but building work continued above ground, with some roads and houses eventually resting on only a thin crust – in places between only one and two metres deep – above large underground cavities with inadequate support.

A five-year central government-funded project began in late 2005 to stabilise and fill the abandoned mine workings. Bath and North East Somerset Council approved the planning application in June 2003 and approximately 760 village properties were included within its boundary. All mine workings inside the boundary of the planning application were stabilised using foam concrete to satisfy a 100-year design life while ensuring archaeologically important areas and bat habitats were protected. In some hydrologically sensitive areas, "stowing" – an infill with limestone aggregate – was undertaken. Archaeologically important areas were filled with sand and new bat caves and tunnels were created.

The £154.6 million grant for the works came from the Land Stabilisation Programme which was set up by the government in 1999 to deal with "abandoned non-coal mine workings which are likely to collapse and threaten life and property" and managed by English Partnerships, the national regeneration agency. The total amount included £22.7m which had already been used for emergency stabilisation work before the approval of the main project. Several public art projects celebrated the completion of the stabilisation works.

== Foxhill Estate and Mulberry Park ==
From 1935 to 2011, the Admiralty (later part of the Ministry of Defence) owned a 46 acres (19 ha) site called Foxhill (previously a farm) on the Bradford Road. In 2013, the Curo housing organisation purchased the site where it is developing 700 new homes (151 of those to be social homes) with open spaces and community facilities, to be called Mulberry Park. Foxhill already had nearly 900 homes, and in 2014 Curo wanted to redevelop Queens Drive, Kewstoke Road, local shops and Sedgemoor Road. In 2018, Curo decided not to demolish the Foxhill Estate and instead will improve the existing rented properties on the estate. The development of Mulberry Park continued and is set to complete in 2024, although many properties are already occupied and a school and community centre are in full operation.

== Combe Down railway tunnel ==
Combe Down Tunnel was opened in 1874 and emerges below the southern slopes of the village. It was once the UK's longest railway tunnel (1,829 yards or 1,672 metres) without intermediate ventilation. The tunnel now forms part of the £1.8 million Two Tunnels Greenway walking and cycling path which opened on 6 April 2013. At over a mile long, the Combe Down tunnel is the longest cycling tunnel in Britain and features an interactive light and sound installation as well as mobile phone coverage. Its custodian is Wessex Water.

== Jewish burial ground ==
The Jewish burial ground is a site of historic value on Bradford Road and is one of only fifteen in the country to survive from the Georgian period. While the burial ground suffered a period of neglect since it ceased to be used in the early 20th century, much remains intact to serve as an important reminder of Bath's historic Jewish community. It dates from 1812, and the last recorded burial was in 1942. The site contains a small building, once thought to be a prayer house (Ohel), but more recent research by the Friends of Bath Jewish Burial Ground. who manage the site, have shown that it was a cottage used by the caretakers of the burial ground, and not used for religious purposes. English Heritage gave the Burial Ground a Grade II listing in 2006. The site contains two chest tombs and some fifty gravestones, dating from between 1842 and 1921, with both Hebrew and English inscriptions. Funds to restore the cottage, conserve the grave stones, repair the boundary wall, replace the gates and develop interpretation of the site have been obtained from a number of charitable sources and a series of restoration works have been undertaken in the period 2015-2022. The site is opened for public visiting several times a year and private access can be arranged by appointment through the Friends.

== De Montalt Mill ==
The De Montalt paper mill stood on the southern slopes of the village during the 19th century; it gradually fell into picturesque ruin until it was converted into housing during 2007. The mill was built on land owned by Thomas Ralph Maude, Viscount Hawarden (1767–1807) in the early 19th century and was owned by John Bally (1773 – 1854), (a bookseller in Milsom Street in Bath), William Allan or Ellan (1781 – 1832) and George Steart (d.1837), all trading as paper-makers under the name of John Bally & Co.

A print dating from the 1850s shows the mill which then possessed the largest water wheel in England, measuring 56 feet (17 m) in diameter. It has subsequently been discovered that most of the coloured papers used by J. M. W. Turner (1775–1851) for a good number of his approximately twenty thousand drawings and watercolours were made at De Montalt Mill. The collection is now housed in The Turner Bequest at the Tate Gallery, London. The paper was of a very high standard and the watercolour boards were made without being pasted together which ensured they remained free from mildew; however, despite the early success of the business, it failed in 1834 . The premises were then sold to wholesale stationer William Jennings Allen (1807 – 1839). After his death it was sold to Charles Middleton Kernot (1807 – 1876) to be used as a ‘manufactory of patent interlocked and dovetailed felted cloths’. By 1859 it was used for a laundry run by the Bath Washing Company Ltd. and later used for a variety of purposes including market gardening (1871); and cabinet making from (1875) until the lease expired in 1905 and it closed. In the 20th century cows and pigs were being reared on the site.

Various parts of the mill have Grade II listed building status, including the southern range which consisted of the apprentice shops and stores, the main east block which was the printing works where notes were printed for the Bank of England – later converted to cabinet manufacturing and the chimney. De Montalt, an Italianate villa set in the grounds is also grade II listed.

The mill and its associated buildings were converted to residential use during 2007, with the main mill building being converted into four apartments. Elements of the conversion featured in the Channel 4 television programme Grand Designs.

== Local flora ==
A local woodland wild flower is the Bath Asparagus, also known as the Spiked Star of Bethlehem (Ornithogalum pyrenaicum). The flowers appear in June after the leaves die; the leaves resemble bluebell leaves but are a softer green and not as glossy. The flowering spike is up to one metre high. At the unopened stage the flowers used to be gathered in small quantities as a fresh vegetable by local people; it was also occasionally sold in local markets, but picking the flowers today is not encouraged as wild asparagus is becoming rare. According to research carried out by Avon Wildlife Trust the plant is found throughout Europe but has only a limited UK distribution. It is possible that the flower was first brought to the Bath area as seeds carried on the wheels and hooves of Roman vehicles and animals.

Allium ursinum, also known as Ramsons or wild garlic, is abundant in the National Trust woodlands adjacent to Combe Down during the spring.2015.

== Grade I and II listed buildings on Combe Down ==
There are 79 Grade I and Grade II listed buildings – a building officially designated as being of special architectural, historical, or cultural significance – on Combe Down, the earliest dating from 1729 and the latest from 1909. They are from three main phases of building activity.

The first phase was c. 1700–1742. These are the buildings at Combe Grove, and the buildings commissioned by Ralph Allen at Prior Park and at De Montalt Place on Church Road.

The second phase was c. 1800 – c. 1820. These are mainly buildings along Combe Road, Summer Lane, and Church Road at Isabella Place and from Claremont House to Hopecote Lodge, which were built soon after the death of Cornwallis Maude, 1st Viscount Hawarden (1729–1803) who died with substantial debts which led to the break-up of the De Montalt estate in Bath, as speculators in property and mining took the opportunity.

The third phase was Victorian, from c. 1830 to 1860. Combe Down had become known as a place for convalescence and "good air" (away from polluted cities) and, being only about 1.5 miles (2.4 km) from Bath, was perfect for this as well as for middle class professionals. These are mainly buildings along North Road, The Avenue, Belmont Road and Church Road east of Hopecote Lodge.

A list of these listed buildings with links to Images of England – an online photographic record of all the listed buildings in England at the date of February 2001 – is given below.

Shaft Road

- Lodge Style
- Combe Grove Manor hotel

North Road

- 100 to 104 North Road
- Tyning House
- Victoria Cottage
- 1 to 3 Oxford Place
- 106A North Road
- 124 to 128 North Road
- 130 and 132 North Road
- 134 and 136 North Road
- 138 North Road
- 140 and 140A North Road
- 142 North Road
- 144 North Road
- 146 to 152 North Road
- 154 and 156 North Road

The Avenue

- Hadley Arms
- 1 and 2 Park Place
- 3 Park Place
- 2 Avenue Place
- 3 to 5 Avenue Place
- Isabella House

Combe Road

- 16 to 22 Combe Road
- 24 Combe Road
- 26 to 30 Combe Road
- 158 to 162 Priory Place
- 42 and 44 Combe Road
- 46 and 48 Combe Road
- 50 and 52 Combe Road
- King William IV
- Rock Hall House
- 62 Combe Road
- 1 to 3 Byfield Buildings
- 1 to 5 Byfield Place

Summer Lane

- 1 to 13 Quarry Vale Cottages
- De Montalt
- Chimney to West of De Montalt Works
- De Montalt Works (Main East Block)
- De Montalt Works (South Range)
- 1 to 3 De Montalt Cottages

Belmont Road

- West Brow
- Ashlands
- Belmont
- Combe Ridge
- St. Christopher
- Vale View House

Church Road

- 71 to 79 Church Road
- 81 Church Road
- 1 De Montalt Place
- 83 to 101 Church Road
- Church Of The Holy Trinity
- The Vicarage
- Claremont House
- Union Chapel
- 113 to 117 Church Road
- Hope Cote Lodge
- Combe Down junior school
- Combe Lodge
- Lodge to the Brow
- The Brow
- 141 Church Road
- Combe House
- 149 Church Road
- 151 Church Road
- 153–155 Church Road (one property)
- 157 Church Road
- 159 Church Road

Prior Park

- Prior Park (now Prior Park College)
- Prior Park Gymnasium
- The Priory
- Palladian Bridge
- Porter's Lodge
- Church of St. Paul
- Middle gateway
- Garden archway
- Grotto
- Ice house
- Pool screen wall
- Gate posts to drive
- Gate posts to entrance

== Notable residents ==
Henry John Patch (better known as Harry Patch, the "Last Fighting Tommy") was born in Combe Down in 1898; both his father and grandfather were Combe Down stonemasons. His family home is still in existence in Gladstone Road. Patch was briefly the third oldest man in the world and the last trench veteran of World War I, a status which earned him international fame during the early 21st century. He died in July 2009, aged 111, by which time he was the last soldier to have fought in the trenches during World War One as well as the second last surviving British war veteran and one of four surviving soldiers from the conflict worldwide. His memoir The Last Fighting Tommy (published in 2007) records his Combe Down childhood in some detail. His funeral cortège passed through Combe Down village on its way to his burial in Monkton Combe churchyard.

Herbert Lambert (1881–1936), society portrait photographer and harpsichord and clavichord maker.

Frederic Weatherly (1848–1929), the composer of the song Danny Boy, lived at Grosvenor Lodge (now renamed St Christopher ) in Belmont Road during the second decade of the 20th century.

Charlotte McDonnell, once the most subscribed-to YouTube vlogger in the United Kingdom, grew up in Combe Down before moving to London in 2010.

Eliza Margaret Jane Humphreys (1850–1938), a novelist using the pen name 'Rita', lived in Richardson Avenue (now The Firs) in the 1920s before moving to the house called West Brow.

Rod Adams (born 1945), a former professional footballer who started his career in Foxhill Rangers.
