= Alf Messer =

English footballer

Personal information
- Full name: Alfred Thomas Messer
- Date of birth: 8 March 1900
- Place of birth: Deptford, England
- Date of death: 1947 (aged 46–47)
- Position: Centre half

Senior career*
Years	Team	Apps	(Gls)
	Sutton Town	?	(?)
	Mansfield Town	?	(?)
1922	Nottingham Forest	0	(0)
1923–1929	Reading	271	(18)
1930–1931	Tottenham Hotspur	51	(2)
1934–1935	Bournemouth & Boscombe	10	(0)
- * Club domestic league appearances and goals

Alfred Thomas Messer (8 March 1900 – 1947) was a footballer who played for Sutton Town, Mansfield Town, Reading, Nottingham Forest, Tottenham Hotspur and Bournemouth.

== Football career ==
Messer played non League football at Sutton Town before joining Mansfield Town. In 1922 he joined Nottingham Forest but left the club without playing a senior match. The centre half signed for Reading in 1923 and went on to feature in 271 matches and scored 18 goals between 1923 and 1929. Messer signed for Tottenham Hotspur in 1930 and played in 52 games and found the net twice in all competitions. On leaving White Hart Lane he joined Bournemouth & Boscombe where he made a further 10 appearances and where he finally ending his playing career.
