= George Crawford (cricketer) =

English cricketer

George Henry Crawford (15 December 1890 – 28 June 1975) was an English first-class cricketer, who played nine matches for Yorkshire County Cricket Club between 1914 and 1926. He also appeared for the Yorkshire Second XI in his last year in the first-class game.

Born in Hull, Crawford was a right arm fast bowler, he took 21 wickets at an average of 25.76, with a best of 5 for 59 against Surrey. A right-handed tail end batsman, he scored 46 runs, with a best of 21 against the Australians, at an average of 5.75. He also claimed 4 for 38 against the Australians in the match he played against them in 1926.

Crawford died in Hull aged 84, in June 1975.
