= Ken Whiteside =

English footballer

Personal information
- Full name: Edward Kenneth Whiteside
- Date of birth: 11 December 1929 (age 96)
- Place of birth: Liverpool, Lancashire, England
- Height: 6 ft 0 in (1.83 m)
- Position: Inside forward

Senior career*
Years	Team	Apps	(Gls)
- British Eckna Works
1952–????	Preston North End	0	(0)
- British Eckna Works
1953–1954	Chesterfield	9	(3)
1954–1955	York City	8	(0)
1955–1956	Bournemouth	1	(0)
Total		18	(3)
- * Club domestic league appearances and goals

Edward Kenneth Whiteside (born 11 December 1929) is an English former professional footballer who played as an inside forward in the Football League for Chesterfield, York City and Bournemouth, in non-League football for British Eckna Works, and was on the books of Preston North End without making a league appearance.
