= Harry Falconer =

English footballer

Personal information
- Full name: Henry Falconer
- Date of birth: 22 December 1954 (age 71)
- Place of birth: Newcastle upon Tyne, England
- Position: Right back

Youth career
- Burnley

Senior career*
Years	Team	Apps	(Gls)
1974–1975	Bournemouth	7	(0)
1975–1976	Wimbledon	14	(1)
- * Club domestic league appearances and goals

Henry Falconer (born 22 December 1954) is an English former professional footballer who played in the Football League as a defender.
