= George Crawford (footballer) =

English footballer

George William Crawford (10 December 1905 – 1975) was an English professional association footballer of the 1920s. Born in Sunderland, he joined Gillingham from his hometown club in 1927 and went on to make 40 appearances for the club in The Football League. He left to join Bournemouth in 1929.
