= Ron Young (footballer, born 1925) =

English footballer

Personal information
- Full name: Cecil Rodney Young
- Date of birth: 22 July 1925
- Place of birth: Bournemouth, England
- Date of death: 18 March 1991 (aged 65)
- Place of death: Barton on Sea, England
- Position: Right half

Senior career*
Years	Team	Apps	(Gls)
1947–1948	Southampton	0	(0)
1948–1950	Bournemouth & Boscombe Athletic	18	(0)
- Chelmsford City
- * Club domestic league appearances and goals

Cecil Rodney Young (22 July 1925 — 18 March 1991) was an English footballer who played as a right half.

== Career ==
In 1948, Young signed for hometown club Bournemouth & Boscombe Athletic after being signed to Southampton as an amateur. Over the course of two years, Young made 18 Football League appearances for Bournemouth & Boscombe. Following his time at Bournemouth & Boscombe, Young signed for Chelmsford City.
