= Fuller's earth =

Any clay material that can decolorise oil or other liquids

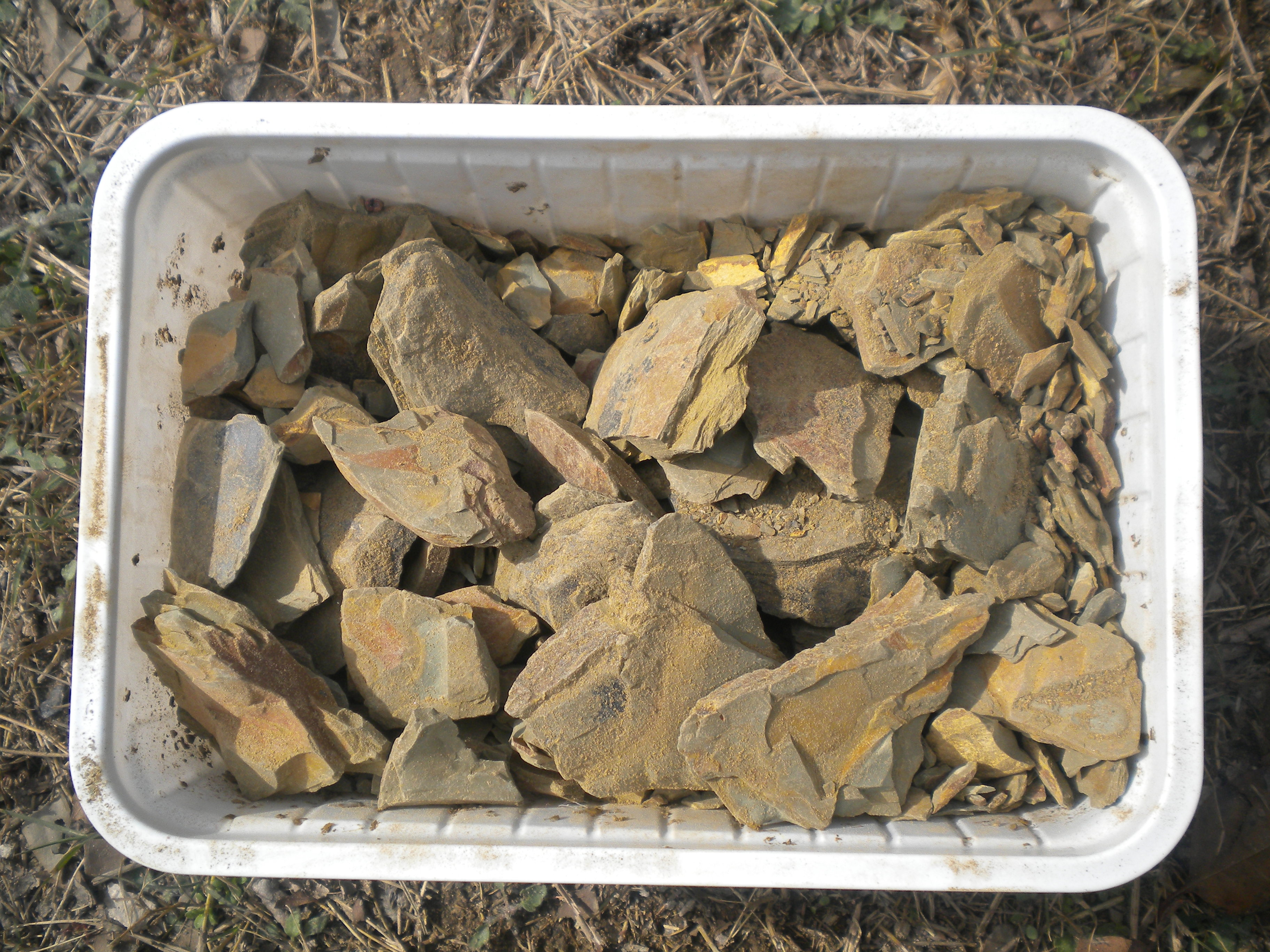
A sample of fuller's earth in its raw state from Pakistan

Fuller's earth refers to various types of clay used as an absorbent, filter, or bleaching agent. Products labeled Fuller's Earth typically consist of palygorskite (also known as attapulgite) or bentonite. Primary modern uses include as absorbents for oil, grease, and animal waste (cat litter), and as a carrier for pesticides and fertilizers. Minor uses include filtering, clarifying, and decolorizing; as an active and inactive ingredient in beauty products; and as a filler in paint, plaster, adhesives, and pharmaceuticals. It also has a number of uses in the film and theatre industries.

== Etymology ==
The English name reflects the historical use of the material for fulling (cleaning and shrinking) wool, by textile workers known as fullers. In past centuries, fullers kneaded fuller's earth and water into woollen cloth to absorb lanolin, oils, and other greasy impurities as part of the cloth finishing process.

The original spelling was without an apostrophe, but the apostrophe became more common in the 19th century, both before or after the s. Fuller's earth is the most common spelling today, but both fullers earth and fullers' earth remain in wide use.

Fuller's earth is also known by the following other names:

- Bleaching clay, probably because fulling whitened the cloth.
- Whitening clay, particularly when used to treat facial pigmentation, such as melasma.
- Multani mitti (Hindustani: transl. 'clay of Multan'; Urdu: ملتانی مِٹّی; Hindi: मुल्तानी मिट्टी), widely used in the Indian subcontinent in cosmetics. The name comes from the city of Multan, in modern-day Pakistan, the area of its origin.

== Occurrence and composition ==
Fuller's earth consists primarily of hydrous aluminum silicates (clay minerals) of varying composition. Common components are montmorillonite, kaolinite, and attapulgite. Small amounts of other minerals may be present in fuller's earth deposits, including calcite, dolomite, and quartz. In some localities fuller's earth refers to calcium bentonite, which is altered volcanic ash composed mostly of montmorillonite.

In 2005, the United States was the largest producer of fuller's earth with an almost 70% world share followed at a distance by Japan and Mexico. In the United States fuller's earth is typically derived from deposits of volcanic ash of Cretaceous age and younger (glacial clays do not form fuller's earth). Fuller's earth deposits have been mined in 24 states. The first discovery of fuller's earth in the United States was near Quincy, Florida, in 1893; previously it was imported from England. In 1939 mines near Quincy produced half the U.S. production.

In the United Kingdom, fuller's earth occurs mainly in England. It has been mined in the Lower Greensand Group and the Vale of White Horse, Oxfordshire. The Combe Hay Mine was a fuller's earth mine operating to the south of Bath, Somerset, until 1979. Other sites south of Bath included Frome, Lonsdale, Englishcombe, Tucking Mill, and Duncorn Hill. Although these sites had been used since Roman times, William Smith developed new methods for the identification of deposits of fuller's earth to the south of Bath. Other English sources include a mine near Redhill, Surrey (worked until 2000), and Woburn, Bedfordshire, where production ceased in 2004.

Hills, cliffs, and slopes that contain fuller's earth can be unstable, since this material can be thixotropic when saturated by heavy rainfall.

== Historical significance ==
Fulling is an important step in the production of woolen garments, and can be traced back to ancient times. Cuneiform texts from Mesopotamia mention a raw material, im-bab-bár (Akkadian: 𒅎𒌓, gaṣṣu: 'gypsum, plaster'), literally "white earth", which was delivered to fullers for the finishing of cloth. There are several Biblical references to fulling (2 Kings 18:17; Isaiah 7:3 and 36:2; Malachi 3:2; Mark 9:3), but the materials used to whiten the fabric are not specified. Pliny the Elder mentions several types of fuller's earth (creta fullonia in Latin) from a variety of locations, each with different properties and therefore different uses.

The first references to fulling mills are from Persia, and by the time of the Crusades in the late eleventh century, fulling mills were active throughout the medieval world.

The use of fuller's earth across the Indian subcontinent dates back to at least 1879. While its household use and transportation by local carts in the Sindh region of Pakistan predates the 1800s, export by rail was first recorded in 1929 in British India.

The value of fuller's earth is a plot point in the Sherlock Holmes story "The Adventure of the Engineer's Thumb" (1892). In the story, an engineer is paid an outlandish sum to repair a hydraulic press, accepting his client's explanation that the potential profit from fuller's earth warrants both the expense and total secrecy. The adventure is set in 1889, implying that fuller's earth was then well-known as a lucrative commodity, "only found in one or two places in England".

== Uses ==
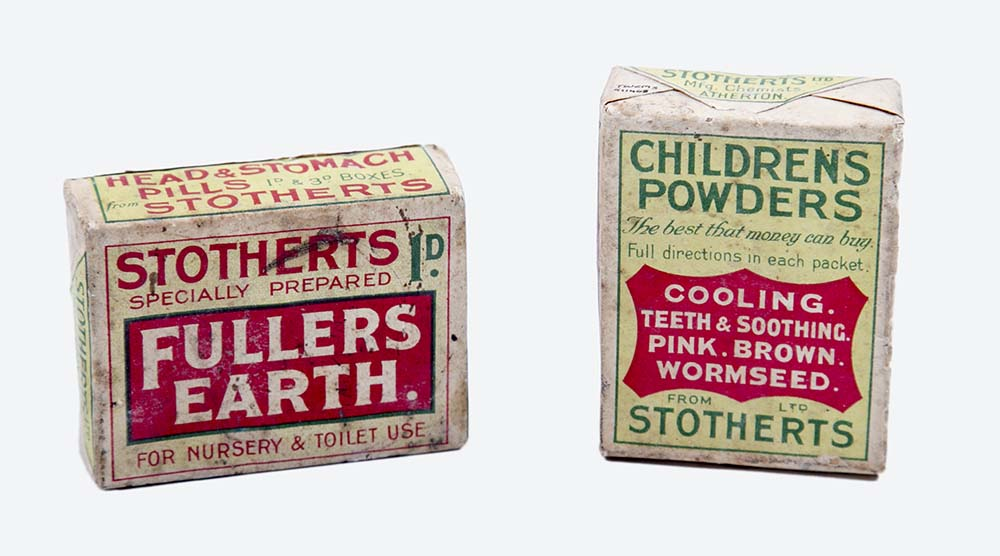
Boxes of fuller's earth (about 1915)

Fuller's earth is utilized in a number of industries. Most important modern applications make use of the minerals' natural absorbent properties in products sold as absorbents or filters.

- In the fulling of raw fibers, historically, and most importantly, removing the lanolin from sheep's wool.
- Treatment for poisoning. Even given the risk of salmonella, the clay content of soil could save the life of a person exposed to paraquat, for example, as paraquat is intended to break down in soil.
- Decontamination: Fuller's earth is used by military and civil emergency service personnel to decontaminate the clothing and equipment of servicemen and CBRN (chemical, biological, radiological, nuclear) responders who have been contaminated with chemical agents.
- Cleaning agent: In the Indian subcontinent, it has been used to clean marble. As a good absorbent, it removes dust, dirt, impurities and stains from the surface and replenishes the shine of marble. It has been used numerous times to clean the Taj Mahal, India.
- Cat litter: Since the late 1940s, fuller's earth has been used in commercial cat litter.
- Cosmetology and dermatology: The same properties that make fuller's earth effective at removing oils, dirt, and impurities from wool are also effective on human hair and skin.

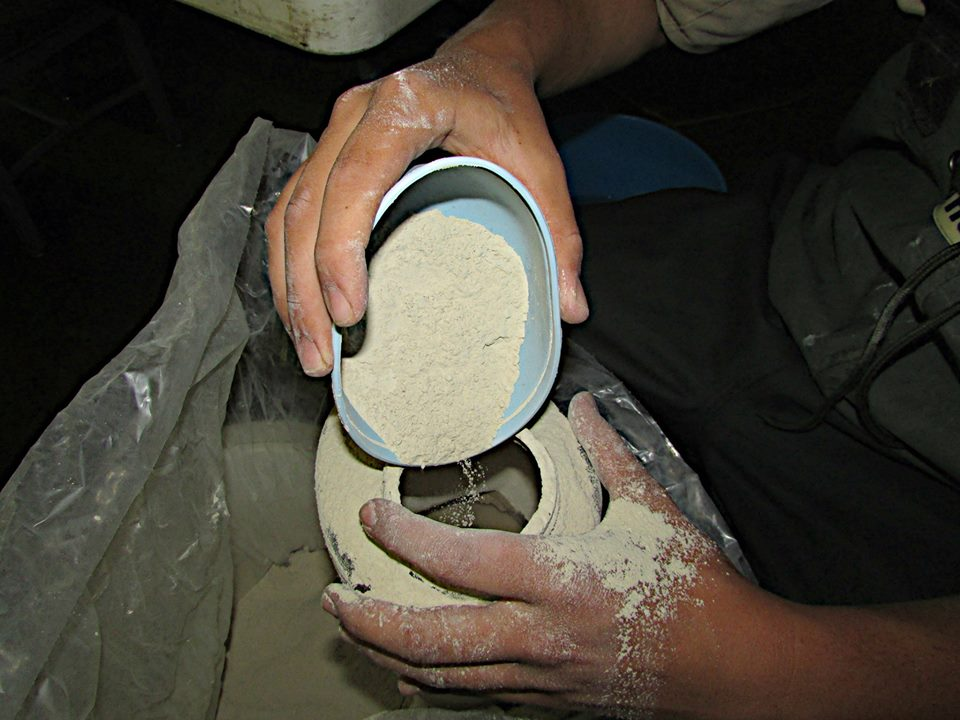
Fuller's earth being used to create "muddy" water to simulate a natural habitat for the laboratory hatching of fish eggs

- In the laboratory, for filtering, decolorizing, absorbing, and mimicking natural sediment (as in experiments simulating the weathering effects of erosion and deposition in geological experiments, and hatching fish eggs).
- Fuller's earth has been used extensively for many years in motion pictures for a variety of applications, spanning from make-up, wardrobe, and set dressing, to special effects. In the area of special effects, it is used in pyrotechnics explosions and dust clouds, because it spreads farther and higher than most natural soils, resulting in a blast that looks larger, and is safer than naturally occurring soil should the blast spray hit actors. It was used in the tornado sequence in The Wizard of Oz as the artificial twister ploughed its way toward the farmhouse. Fuller's earth is also widely used by the make-up, props, wardrobe, and set dresser departments, because it is considered a "clean" dirt, safer to use around people, and it cleans up easily. However, health concerns in this regard have been debated. Fuller's earth is available in small quantities by make-up suppliers for use in making the face and body appear dirty. It is used by props technicians to make furniture look dusty. Wardrobe dressers use a small, loose-mesh cloth bag filled with fuller's earth to apply it to clothing to make it appear dusty. Set dressers use fuller's earth to change paved streets into dirt roads, to create dust trailing from a moving vehicle over a dirt road, or to indicate a vehicle trail over untravelled ground.

== See also ==
- Diatomaceous earth
- Kaolinite
- Medicinal clay
- Sepiolite
