= Les Sille =

English footballer

Personal information
- Full name: Leslie Taylor Sille
- Date of birth: 12 April 1928
- Place of birth: Liverpool, England
- Date of death: 7 April 2007 (aged 78)
- Place of death: Liverpool, England
- Position: Winger

Youth career
- Tranmere Rovers

Senior career*
Years	Team	Apps	(Gls)
1946–1947	Bournemouth	1	(0)
1947–1948	Crystal Palace	3	(0)
1948–1949	Tranmere Rovers	1	(0)
Total		5	(0)
- * Club domestic league appearances and goals

Les Sille (12 April 1928 – 7 April 2007) was an English footballer, who played as a winger in the Football League for Tranmere Rovers.
