= Rod Adams =

English footballer

Personal information
- Full name: Rodney Leslie Adams
- Date of birth: 15 September 1945 (age 81)
- Place of birth: Bath, England
- Position: Winger

Youth career
- Foxhill Rangers

Senior career*
Years	Team	Apps	(Gls)
1965–1966	Frome Town		
1966–1969	Bournemouth & Boscombe Athletic	17	(4)
1969–1975	Weymouth	223	(26)
1975–1977	Yeovil Town		
- * Club domestic league appearances and goals

Rodney Leslie Adams (born 15 September 1945) is an English former professional footballer who played in the Football League for Bournemouth & Boscombe Athletic as a winger.

His early football was played for Foxhill Rangers based at Foxhill, Bath where he lived. He joined Bournemouth from non-league Frome Town for a transfer fee of £500.

He joined Weymouth, where he made 339 appearances in all competitions, including 28 as substitute. While at Weymouth off the field he was an accounts clerk for Devenish Brewery. Now resident in Vancouver, Canada. His father Les was a non-league footballer in Bath.
