= Edmund Lowson =

English footballer

Personal information
- Full name: Edmund Lowsond
- Date of birth: 21 March 1895
- Place of birth: Evenwood, England
- Date of death: 1955 (aged 59–60)
- Position: Half-back

Senior career*
Years	Team	Apps	(Gls)
1914–1915	Cockfield Swifts		
1919–1920	Crook Town		
1921	Spennymoor United		
1921	Nottingham Forest	0	(0)
1921–1923	Blackpool	5	(0)
1923–1924	Doncaster Rovers	18	(0)
1924–1926	Bournemouth & Boscombe Athletic	4	(0)
1926	Poole		
1926–1927	Durham City	42	(0)
1928–1930	Halifax Town	59	(0)
Total		128	(0)
- * Club domestic league appearances and goals

Edmund Lowson (21 March 1895 – 1955) was an English footballer who played in the Football League for Blackpool, Bournemouth & Boscombe Athletic, Doncaster Rovers, Durham City and Halifax Town.
