= Two Tunnels Greenway =

Walking and cycling path in Bath, England

NCN Route 244 Two Tunnels Greenway
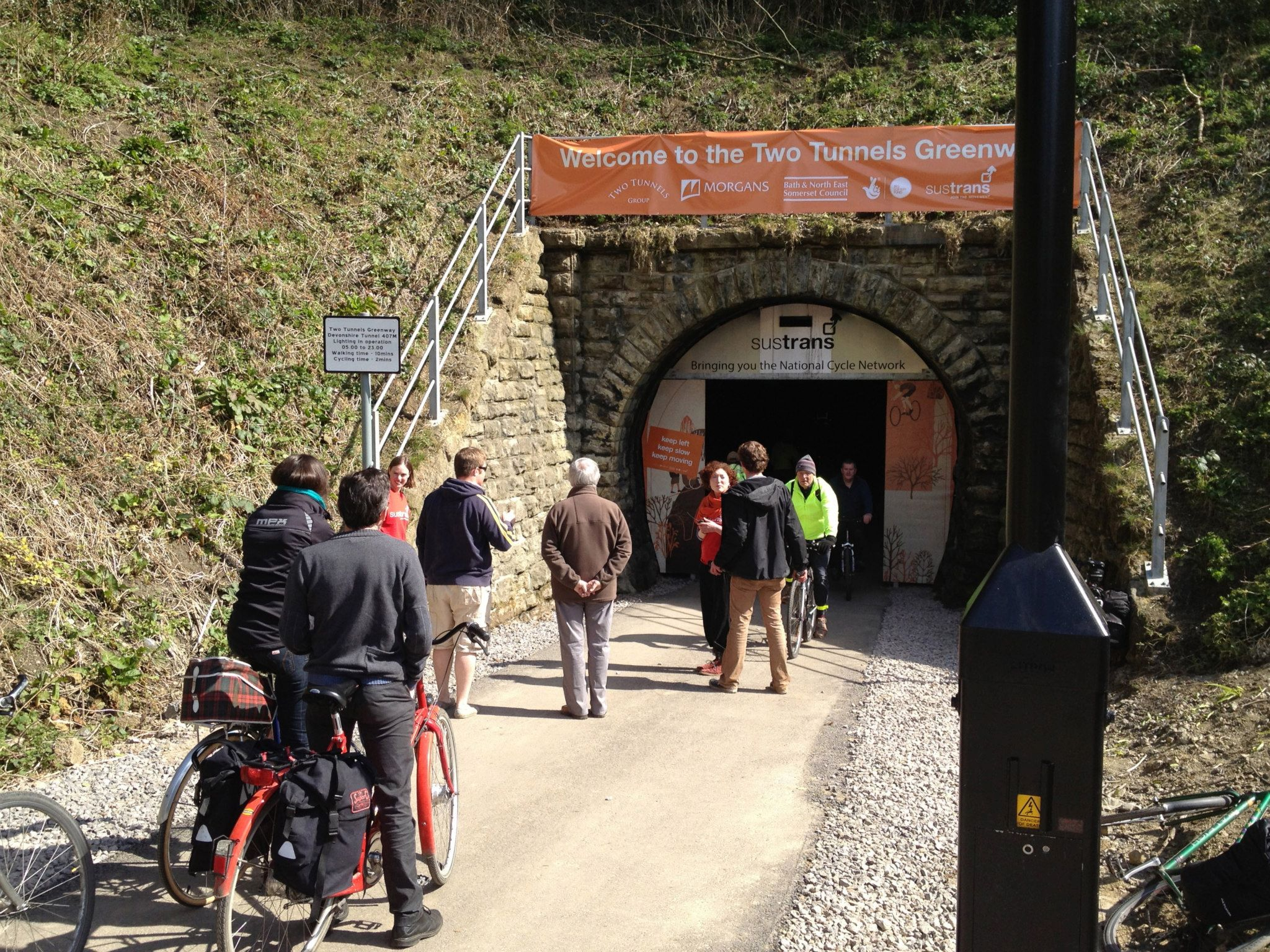
- The western portal of the Devonshire Tunnel on the Greenway's opening day in 2013
- Length: 3.8 miles (6.1 km)
- Location: Somerset, United Kingdom
- Established: 6 April 2013
- Designation: UK National Cycle Network
- Trailheads: East Twerton (west) to Midford (east)
- Use: Cycling
- Highest point: Combe Down Tunnel, 91.4 m (300 ft)
- Lowest point: East Twerton, 18.8 m (62 ft)
- Difficulty: Easy
- Website: https://www.sustrans.org.uk/find-a-route-on-the-national-cycle-network/route-244/

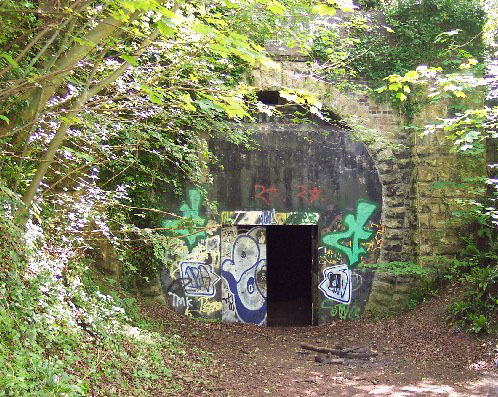
Combe Down Tunnel in 2005

The Two Tunnels Greenway is a shared use path for walking and cycling in Bath, Somerset, England. The route links National Cycle Route 24 south of Bath with National Cycle Route 4 in the town centre, and is designated as National Cycle Route 244.

== Route ==
The route follows the disused railway trackbed of the Somerset and Dorset Joint Railway from East Twerton through the Bath suburb of Oldfield Park to the Devonshire Tunnel. It emerges into Lyncombe Vale before entering the Combe Down Tunnel, and then coming out to cross Tucking Mill Viaduct at Tucking Mill into Midford. The new route links National Cycle Route 4 in Bath and National Cycle Route 24, 2.5 miles (4 km) south of the city.

== History ==
NCN24, crossing Midford viaduct, at the south end of the 'Two Tunnels' route, opened in 2005. Sustainable transport charity Sustrans has met with success with its bid for National Lottery funding to start construction of the route. A 'Two Tunnels Steering Group' was established, consisting of the Two Tunnels group, Bath and North East Somerset Council and Sustrans, to ensure the route's successful development.

In June 2009 the major structures were surveyed in preparation for their transfer into the ownership of the local authority from Wessex Water, but the costs of refurbishing the Tunnels exceeded the total project budget then estimated to be £1.9M, with £1M coming from Sustrans. Subsequently, it was agreed that Sustrans should take ownership of the tunnels and be responsible for their refurbishment.

Work began in March 2010 with the excavation of the then-buried western portal of the Devonshire Tunnel, and the project was completed and opened on 6 April 2013. In July 2010, Wessex Water transferred the care of the Devonshire and Combe Down tunnels to Sustrans. Development plans were said to include the installation of motion-sensitive lighting, mobile phone coverage and CCTV within the tunnels, though at the time the Greenway opened, no plans existed for mobile phone coverage in the tunnels.

The Combe Down tunnel reopened on 6 April 2013.

== See also ==
- National Cycle Network
- Combe Down
- Combe Down Tunnel
- Bath, Somerset
