= John Campbell =

John Campbell may refer to:

== Academia ==
- John Francis Campbell (1821–1885), scholar of Celtic folklore and language; inventor
- John Edward Campbell (1862–1924), mathematician credited for the Campbell-Hausdorff formula
- John Lorne Campbell (1906–1996), Scottish historian, farmer, environmentalist, and folklore scholar
- John R. Campbell (1933–2018), American dairy scientist and university administrator
- John P. Campbell (psychologist) (1937–2025), American psychologist
- John Campbell (casting scientist) (born 1938), British engineer
- John Angus Campbell (born 1942), retired American professor of rhetoric
- John Campbell (philosopher) (born 1956), professor of philosophy at the University of California
- John Y. Campbell (born 1958), professor of economics at Harvard University

== Business ==
- Sir John Campbell (farmer) (1934–2024), Scottish farmer and businessman
- John Saxton Campbell (c. 1787–1855), British seigneur and shipbuilder in Lower Canada
- John W. Campbell (financier) (1880–1957), American financier
- John A. Campbell (lumber executive) (1941–2008), Australian-American timber executive

== Literature and journalism ==
- John Campbell (editor) (1653–1728), pioneer colonial American journalist
- John Campbell (author) (1708–1775), Scottish author
- Wal Campbell or John William Wallace Campbell (1906–1979), Australian anti-Catholic journalist
- John W. Campbell (1910–1971), American science fiction writer, editor of Analog Science Fiction and Fact
- John Campbell (biographer) (born 1947), British political biographer
- John Campbell (broadcaster) (born 1964), television and radio reporter in New Zealand
- John Campbell, author of Pictures for Sad Children

== Military ==
- John Campbell, 4th Earl of Loudoun (1705–1782), general in North America
- John Campbell of Strachur (1727–1806), general at Pensacola in the West Florida province
- John Campbell of Stonefield (1753–1784), lieutenant–colonel at Mangalore
- John Campbell (British Army officer, died 1804), British colonel and lieutenant-governor of Plymouth
- John B. Campbell (1777–1814), soldier during the War of 1812
- John Campbell (Indian Army officer, born 1802) (1802–1878), British general
- Sir John Campbell, 2nd Baronet (1807–1855), major-general, killed in attack upon the Redan at Sevastopol
- Sir John Campbell, 1st Baronet (1836–1915), major-general, R.A., served in Crimea, China, Afghan War, Zhob Valley
- John Hasluck Campbell (1855–1921), brigadier, Sutherland Highlanders, served in First World War
- John Vaughan Campbell (1876–1944), Victoria Cross recipient, brigadier-general, First World War, ADC to the King 1919–1938
- Jock Campbell (British Army officer) or John Charles Campbell (1894–1942), major-general and Victoria Cross recipient
- John F. Campbell (general) (born 1954), U.S. Army general
- John Campbell (Loyalist) (Died 1776), British Loyalist Captain at the Battle of Moore's Creek Bridge

== Music ==
- John Campbell (blues guitarist) (1952–1993), American blues guitarist
- John Campbell (jazz pianist) (born 1955), American jazz pianist
- John Campbell (born 1972), American musician, bassist for Lamb of God
- John Campbell (musical composer), American musical composer

== Politics ==
=== Australia ===
- John Thomas Campbell (1770–1830), member of the New South Wales Legislative Council
- John Campbell (Australian politician) (1802–1886), member of the New South Wales Legislative Council and the New South Wales Legislative Assembly
- John Dunmore Campbell (1854–1909), member of the Queensland Legislative Assembly

=== Canada ===
- John Campbell (Royal Navy officer) (c. 1720–1790), Commodore Governor for Newfoundland
- John Campbell (Upper Canada politician) (1789–1834)
- John Campbell (London, Ontario politician) (1823–1901), manufacturer and municipal politician in Ontario
- John Campbell (Nova Scotia politician) (1849–1887), Conservative member of the Canadian Parliament from Nova Scotia of Digby
- John A. Campbell (Manitoba politician) (1872–1963)
- John Malcolm Campbell (1874–1951)
- John Murray Campbell (1931–2021), Alberta MLA
- John Campbell (Quebec politician) (born 1936), Liberal member of the Canadian Parliament from Quebec
- John Campbell (Ontario politician) (fl. 1990s–2010s)

=== United Kingdom ===
- John Campbell, Earl of Atholl (died 1333), Scottish nobleman
- Sir John Campbell of Cawdor (nobleman) (c. 1490 – 1546), Scottish nobleman
- John Campbell of Lundy (died 1562), Scottish lawyer and courtier
- John Campbell, 3rd of Cawdor (1576–1642), Scottish nobleman and knight
- John Campbell, 1st Earl of Loudoun (1598–1661), Lord Chancellor of Scotland, president of the Privy Council
- Sir John Campbell, 4th Baronet (c. 1615 – c. 1670), Scottish nobleman
- John Campbell, 1st Earl of Breadalbane and Holland (1636–1717), Scottish MP for Argyllshire, 1669–1674
- John Campbell of Shankstown, Scottish soldier and member of the Parliament of Scotland
- John Campbell of Mamore (c. 1660–1729), MP for Dunbartonshire, 1708–1722 and 1725–1727
- John Campbell, 2nd Earl of Breadalbane and Holland (1662–1752), Lord Lieutenant of Perthshire, Chief Justice in Eyre
- John Campbell (Edinburgh MP) (1664–1739), Scottish politician
- John Campbell, 2nd Duke of Argyll (1678–1743), Scottish soldier, Lord Steward, Lord Lieutenant of Surrey
- John Campbell, 4th Duke of Argyll (1693–1770), Scottish Whig politician
- John Campbell of Cawdor (1695–1777), British MP for Pembrokeshire 1727–1747, Inverness Burghs 1754–1761, Corfe Castle 1762–1768
- John Campbell, 3rd Earl of Breadalbane and Holland (1696–1782), Scottish MP for Saltash and Ordford, Master of the Jewel Office, Vice–Admiral of Scotland
- John Campbell, 5th Duke of Argyll (1723–1806), Scottish MP for Glasgow Burghs and for Dover, Lord Lieutenant of Argyllshire
- John Campbell (1750–1826), Scottish lawyer and politician, MP for Ayr Burghs 1794–1807
- John Campbell, 1st Baron Cawdor (1753–1821), British politician, MP for Nairnshire 1777–1780 and for Cardigan Boroughs 1780–1796
- John Campbell, 1st Marquess of Breadalbane (1762–1834), also 4th Earl of Breadalbane and Holland
- John Campbell (1770–1809), Scottish politician, MP for Ayr Burghs 1807–1809, first husband of Lady Charlotte Bury
- John Campbell, 7th Duke of Argyll (1777–1847), Scottish MP for Argyllshire 1799–1820, Keeper of the Great Seal of Scotland
- John Campbell, 1st Baron Campbell (1779–1861), British MP for Stafford, Dudley and Edinburgh, Lord Chief Justice and Lord Chancellor of England
- John Campbell, 1st Earl Cawdor (1790–1860), British earl and MP for Carmarthen from 1813 to 1821
- John Campbell, 2nd Marquess of Breadalbane (1796–1862), British MP for Okehampton and for Perthshire, Lord Chamberlain of the Household
- John Campbell (1798–1830), MP for Dunbartonshire, 1826–1830
- John Campbell-Wyndham (1798–1869), known as John Henry Campbell, Member of the United Kingdom Parliament for Salisbury, 1843–1847
- John Campbell, 2nd Earl Cawdor (1817–1898), British politician, MP for Pembrokeshire 1841–1860
- John Campbell, 9th Duke of Argyll (1845–1914), Scottish MP for Argyllshire 1868–1878 and Manchester South 1895–1900, Governor General of Canada 1878–1883
- John Campbell (Irish surgeon) (1862–1929), Member of the Northern Ireland Parliament
- John Gordon Drummond Campbell (1864–1935), British Member of Parliament for Kingston upon Thames, 1918–1922
- John Campbell (Irish politician) (1870–?), Member of the United Kingdom Parliament for South Armagh 1900–1906
- John Campbell (Labour politician) (died 1937), Northern Irish trade unionist and Northern Ireland Labour Party councillor
- J. R. Campbell (communist) (John Ross Campbell, 1894–1969), Scottish communist activist and newspaper editor
- John Dermot Campbell (1898–1945), Northern Irish businessman and Ulster Unionist MP
- John Campbell, 5th Earl Cawdor (1900–1970), Scottish peer
- John Campbell (mayor), Lord Mayor of Dublin

=== United States ===
- John Campbell (1765–1828), congressman from Maryland
- John Campbell (Westmoreland politician) (1774-1827), Virginia state delegate, state senator, and judge
- John Wilson Campbell (1782–1833), U.S. federal judge & congressman from Ohio
- John Campbell (Arkansas politician) (died 1879) state senator and delegate at the secession convention
- John Campbell (South Carolina politician) (died 1845), congressman from South Carolina
- John Campbell (US Treasurer) (1789–c. 1866), fifth Treasurer of the United States
- John Hull Campbell (1800–1868), congressman from Pennsylvania
- John Archibald Campbell (1811–1889), U.S. Supreme Court justice & Confederate official
  - SS John A. Campbell, a Liberty ship
- John P. Campbell Jr. (1820–1888), congressman from Kentucky
- John Arthur Campbell (1823–1886), Virginia lawyer and politician
- John G. Campbell (1827–1903), U.S. territorial delegate from Arizona
- John Allen Campbell (1835–1880), Wyoming's first provisional governor
- John T. Campbell, 19th-century California state legislator with Civil War army service
- John Tucker Campbell (1912–1991), secretary of state of South Carolina
- John Campbell (diplomat) (born 1944)
- John F. Campbell (politician) (born 1954), Vermont state senator
- John Campbell (California politician) (born 1955), congressman from California
- John M. Campbell (judge) (born 1953), on the Superior Court of the District of Columbia

=== Other countries ===
- Sir John Campbell, of Airds (1807–1853), lieutenant-governor of St Vincent 1845–1853
- Sir John Logan Campbell (1817–1912), figure in the history of Auckland, New Zealand

== Sports ==
- John Argentine Campbell (1877–1917), Scottish rugby union player
- John Campbell (American football) (1938–2024)
- John Campbell (Australian rower) (born 1942), Australian Olympic rower
- John Campbell (baseball) (1907–1995), Washington Senators pitcher
- John Campbell (cricketer) (born 1993), Jamaican cricketer
- John Campbell (curler), New Zealand curler and curling coach
- John Campbell (footballer, born 1850s), Glasgow South Western and Scotland winger
- John Campbell (footballer, born 1869) (1869–1906), Sunderland and Newcastle United forward
- John Campbell (footballer, born 1872) (1872–1947), Celtic and Aston Villa forward
- John Campbell (footballer, born 1877) (1877–1919), Blackburn Rovers, Rangers and Scotland forward
- John Campbell (footballer, born 1988), English footballer
- John Campbell (harness racing) (born 1955), Canadian harness racing driver
- John Campbell (rower) (1899–1939), British rower and Olympic silver medalist
- John Campbell (rugby) (1889–1966), Australian rugby league footballer
- John Campbell (runner) (born 1949), New Zealand long-distance runner
- John Campbell (skier) (born 1962), alpine skier from the Virgin Islands
- John Campbell (snooker player) (born 1953), Australian snooker player
- John Campbell (shot putter), winner of the 1985 NCAA DI outdoor shot put championship
- John Cyril Campbell, English athlete and football coach

== Religion ==
- John Campbell (17th-century minister), prisoner on the Bass Rock
- John Campbell (bishop of Argyll) (died 1613), Scottish clergyman
- John Campbell of Sorn, 17th-century Scottish minister
- John Campbell (missionary) (1766–1840), Scottish missionary in South Africa
- John Campbell (19th-century minister) (1795–1867), minister of Whitefield's Tabernacle, Moorfields, London
- John Nicholson Campbell (1798–1864), Presbyterian clergyman who served as Chaplain of the United States House of Representatives
- John McLeod Campbell (1800–1872), Scottish minister and theologian
- John McLeod Campbell (priest) (1884–1961), English Anglican priest
- John Campbell (moderator) (1758–1828), Church of Scotland minister and moderator of the General Assembly

== Other people ==
- John Campbell, Lord Stonefield (c. 1720 – 1801) Scottish judge
- John Campbell (patentee) (c. 1720–1776), credited for founding Campbelltown, Pennsylvania
- John Campbell of Clathick, Scottish merchant and philanthropist, Lord Provost of Glasgow
- John Henry Campbell (painter) (1757–1829), Irish painter and father of Cecilia Margaret Nairn
- John Campbell (Scottish surgeon) (1784–1867), president of the Royal College of Surgeons of Edinburgh
- John Gregorson Campbell (1836–1891), Scottish folklorist and Free Church minister
- John Hodgson Campbell (1855–1927), British painter
- John Campbell (architect) (1857–1942), practised in New Zealand
- John C. Campbell (1867–1919), American educator known for surveying life in the Appalachians
- John H. Campbell (1868–1928), American judge, associate justice on Arizona's territorial supreme court
- John Patrick Campbell (1883–1962), Belfast artist and illustrator
- John Menzies Campbell (1887–1974), Scottish dentist and dental historian
- John Maurice Hardman Campbell (1891–1973), British physician, cardiologist, and medical journal editor
- John Campbell (YouTuber) (fl. 2010s), British social media influencer and retired nurse educator
- John Campbell or Greg Abbey, American voice actor
- Constable John Campbell, awarded the George Medal for his part in foiling the Linwood bank robbery

== See also ==
- Jack Campbell (disambiguation)
- Jock Campbell (disambiguation)
- John B. Campbell Handicap, thoroughbred horse race in Maryland, US
- John C. Campbell Folk School, a school in Brasstown, North Carolina
- Johnny Campbell (disambiguation)
- Jonathan Campbell (disambiguation)
