= List of people from Newcastle upon Tyne =

This is a list of notable people born in, or associated with, Newcastle upon Tyne in England.

== Born in Newcastle ==
- Alfie Williams – child actor
- Rudolf Abel – Soviet spy
- David Martin Abrahams – entrepreneur and philanthropist
- Thomas Addison (1795–1860) – physician and scientist who first diagnosed Addison's disease
- Mark Akenside – poet and physician
- Ant & Dec – light entertainers (Anthony McPartlin and Declan Donnelly)
- Lord Armstrong – engineer and industrialist
- Ove Arup – architect and civil engineer
- Mary Astell – writer ("the first English feminist")
- Robert Barker – painter and inventor of the panorama
- Phyllida Barlow – artist
- Michelle Bass – model and television pornography presenter
- Joey Batey – actor and singer
- Anna Fisher Beiler – missionary and newspaper editor
- Isaac Lowthian Bell – ironmaster and politician
- Mary Bell – murderer
- Thomas Binney, "Archbishop of Nonconformity"
- David Bradley – science journalist and author
- Israel Brodie – Chief Rabbi of Great Britain
- Basil Bunting – English modernist poet
- Eric Burdon – singer (The Animals)
- Gordon Burn – writer
- John Hodgson Campbell – portrait artist
- Horatio Caro – chess player
- Peter Cadogan – social activist
- Chas Chandler – bass guitarist with the Animals, manager of Jimi Hendrix and Slade
- Cheryl – singer (Girls Aloud)
- Edward Clark – conductor and BBC music producer
- Freddie Clayton – cricketer
- William Clayton – cricketer
- Lord Collingwood – Nelson's second-in-command at Trafalgar
- Jack Common – writer and friend of George Orwell
- David Scott Cowper – yachtsman and multiple circumnavigator by sailing boat and powerboat
- Andrew Cushin – singer and songwriter
- Leif Davis – professional footballer
- Raffaello de Banfield – composer
- John Dewhirst – only Briton to die in the Killing Fields of Cambodia
- Chris Donald – founder of Viz
- Jack Douglas – actor in the Carry On film series
- Lesley Douglas – former controller of BBC Radio 2 and BBC 6 Music
- Jeffrey Dunn – better known as Mantas, musician and former guitarist for the metal band Venom
- Lord Eldon – Lord Chancellor of England
- Anne Elliot – novelist
- Elizabeth Elstob – Anglo-Saxon scholar
- Sarah Lindsay Evans – temperance movement
- Harry Falconer – former professional footballer
- Mary J. Farnham – missionary and temperance advocate
- John Forster – friend and biographer of Charles Dickens
- Huck Gee – contemporary artist
- John and Benjamin Green – father and son architects
- Colin Gregson – keen footballer, 1976 FA Youth Cup winning team
- Julia Griffiths – abolitionist who edited and published the works of Frederick Douglass
- William Hails – writer
- Lee Hall – playwright and screenwriter (Billy Elliot)
- William Hardcastle – first presenter of The World at One
- John Harle – saxophonist and composer
- Tim Healy – actor
- Peter Higgs (1929–2024) – theoretical physicist (Higgs' boson)
- Ian Hogg – actor
- Alan Hull – musician (Lindisfarne)
- Basil Hume – cardinal in the Roman Catholic Church
- Charlie Hunnam – actor (Sons of Anarchy, Queer as Folk, Byker Grove)
- Charles Hutton (1737–1823) – mathematician
- John Irvin – film director
- Wilfred Josephs – composer
- Martin Kenneavy – piper
- Paul Kennedy – historian, author and professor of history at Yale
- Lionel Kopelowitz – Jewish community leader
- Iain Laidlaw – former professional footballer
- Graham Laidler – cartoonist (Punch), also known under the pseudonym Pont
- Lady Lucinda Lambton – writer, photographer, television presenter and producer
- Herbert Laming, Baron Laming – life peer
- Stephanie Lawrence – actress and singer
- Charles Henry Laws – Methodist minister and administrator
- Carla Lynch – comedian and TV presenter
- Carole Malone – columnist and TV presenter
- Neil Marshall – director
- Hank Marvin – guitarist, singer, and songwriter
- Esther McCracken – playwright
- John Anthony McGuckin – theologian, Orthodox arch-priest, Professor of History at Columbia University, NY
- Janet McTeer – Oscar nominated actress
- Jacob Meltzer – New Zealand lawyer, unionist, coroner and community leader
- Charles Merz – electrical engineer noted for creating the electrical grid
- Marion Mingins – Anglican priest
- Jimmy Mullen – England football international
- Matthew Murray – machine-tool manufacturer who designed and built first commercially viable steam locomotive
- Jimmy Nail – actor, singer and writer
- Lesslie Newbigin – bishop and theologian, one of the first bishops of the Church of South India
- Charles Frederick Newcombe (1851–1924) – botanist and ethnographic researcher
- Ross Noble – stand-up comic
- Daniel Oliver – botanist and keeper at Kew Gardens
- Fred Olsen – inventor of the ball propellant manufacturing process
- Pac – professional wrestler
- Brian Redhead – author, journalist and broadcaster
- Thomas Wemyss Reid – journalist and biographer
- Lewis Fry Richardson – meteorologist
- Matt Ridley – science writer
- Alan Robson – radio DJ and broadcaster
- George Robson – racing driver, winner of the Indianapolis 500 in 1946
- Sue Rolph – swimmer
- LJ Ross – author writing locally-set crime thrillers
- Ralph Rumney – artist and co-founder with Guy Debord of the Situationist International
- Sakima – singer
- Hugh Stowell Scott – novelist writing as Henry Seton Merriman
- James Scott – actor
- Lord Stowell – legal authority
- Anna Howard Shaw – leader of the women's suffrage movement in the United States
- Alan Shearer – international footballer, England captain
- Tod Slaughter – actor and film star
- Nancy Spain – author, journalist and TV personality
- Thomas Spence – utopian writer
- Sting – musician
- Miriam Stoppard – doctor and agony aunt (Daily Mirror)
- Peter Taylor, Baron Taylor of Gosforth – Lord Chief Justice of England and Wales
- George Temperley – landowner and founder of the Argentine city Temperley
- Peter Terson – playwright
- Dave Thomas – golfer, twice runner-up in the Open Championship
- Samuel Tolansky (1906–1973) – physicist
- Abigail Thorn – actress and creator of the Philosophy Tube YouTube channel
- Elsie Tu – social activist
- Colin Veitch – Newcastle League and Cup winner, England international footballer, union negotiator, and playwright
- Abhisit Vejjajiva – Thailand's prime minister from 2008
- Bill Ward – actor
- Greg Wise – actor, married to Emma Thompson since 2003
- Emily Woof – actor and writer
- Lord Woolf – Lord Chief Justice of England and Wales
- Adam Wakenshaw – recipient of the Victoria Cross
- Baz Warne – singer and guitarist for the Stranglers
- William G. Whittaker – composer, conductor and teacher
- Daniel Young – cricketer

== Residents (past and present) ==
- Laurence Acton, died 1386/87 – bailiff and MP
- Laurence Acton, died 1410 – bailiff, mayor, and MP; son of the previous Laurence Acton
- William Acton – 14th-century bailiff and MP
- William Acton – 14th-century bailiff and mayor; son of the previous William Acton
- David Almond, born 1951 – prize-winning author (Skellig)
- Gem Archer, born 1966 – guitarist, member of Oasis
- Charles Avison, 1709–1770 – composer and impresario
- William Beilby, 1840–1919 – glass enameller
- Nick Bell, born 1983 – entrepreneur
- Thomas Bewick, 1753–1828 – engraver and ornithologist
- Chaz Brenchley, born 1959 – writer
- Constance Briscoe, born 1957 – judge and bestselling author
- Flavio de Carvalho, 1899–1973 – Brazilian artist and architect
- Sid Chaplin, 1916–1986 – writer
- Charles I, 1600–1649 – prisoner in Newcastle 1646–47
- Catherine Cookson, 1906–1998 – bestselling author
- Joseph Conrad, 1857–1924 – writer, served on Tyne colliers in 1878
- Lucio Costa, 1902–1998 – Brazilian architect, designed masterplan of Brasília, grew up in Newcastle
- Joseph Cowen, 1829–1900 – radical MP and newspaper owner
- John Cunningham, 1729–1773 – pastoral poet, dramatist and stage actor
- Richard Dawes, 1708–1776 – classical scholar
- Robert Burns Dick, 1858–1954 – architect
- John Dobson, 1787–1865 – architect
- Jonathan Edwards, born 1966 – Olympic champion
- J. Meade Falkner, 1858–1932 – head of Armstrongs and novelist (Moonfleet)
- Terry Farrell, 1938–2025 – modern architect
- Bryan Ferry, born 1945 – lead singer of Roxy Music, attended Newcastle University.
- João Cândido, 1880–1969 – Brazilian sailor, leader of the 1910 Revolt of the Lash
- Mike Figgis, born 1948 – film-maker, in Newcastle from the age of eight
- Beryl Fowler, 1881–1963 – English painter
- James Louis Garvin, 1868–1947 – newspaper editor
- Paul Gascoigne, born 1967 – footballer
- Mrs Gaskell, 1810–1865 – novelist
- Tina Gharavi, living – film-maker
- Roger de Grey, 1918–1995 – artist
- Spencer de Grey, born 1944 – architect, head of design at Foster & Partners
- Ingeborg Refling Hagen, 1895–1989 – Norwegian writer
- Tony Harrison, 1937–2025 – poet
- Oliver Heaviside, 1850–1925 – engineer, mathematician and physicist
- Ralph Hedley, 1848–1913 – Realist painter
- Arthur Henderson, 1863–1935 – politician, founder of modern Labour Party
- Beda Higgins, living – poet and writer
- Rob Hubbard, born 1955 – video game musician
- Alan Hull, 1945–1995 – Lindisfarne lead singer
- Eva Ibbotson, 1925–2010 – children's writer (Which Witch?)
- Harold Jeffreys, 1891–1989 – geologist, mathematician and astronomer
- W. E. Johns, 1893–1968 – adventure story writer (Biggles)
- Brian Johnson, born 1947 – third lead singer of AC/DC
- David Knopfler, born 1952 – Dire Straits rhythm guitarist
- Mark Knopfler, born 1949 – Dire Straits lead guitarist and singer
- John Knox, c. 1514–1572 – Scottish religious reformer
- Gibson Kyle, 1820–1903 – architect resident in Gateshead, but his practice was in Newcastle
- Conrad Lant, born 1963 – better known by stage name Cronos, musician with metal band Venom
- John Lilburne, 1614–1667 – radical, born in County Durham, grew up in Newcastle
- Ken Major, 1928–2009 – architect, author and molinologist, attended King's College, Newcastle upon Tyne
- Jean-Paul Marat, 1843–1893 – French revolutionary
- Arthur Hardwick Marsh, 1842–1909 – painter
- John Martin, 1789–1854 – painter
- Harriet Martineau, 1802–1876 – writer and journalist
- Mary Midgley, 1919–2018 – philosopher
- Charles Mitchell, 1820–1895 – shipbuilder
- Elizabeth Montagu, 1718–1800 – coal owner and bluestocking
- Alexei Mordashov, born 1965 – Russian billionaire
- Robert Morrison, 1782–1834 – Protestant missionary in China
- Mo Mowlam, 1949–2005 – Labour politician
- Sir Andrew Noble, 1831–1915 – arms manufacturer and scientist
- Paul Noble, born 1963 – artist
- Keith O'Brien, 1938–2018 – cardinal accused of predatory sexual activity
- Sean O'Brien, born 1952 – poet and critic
- Nikolay Ogarev, 1813–1877 – Russian poet and political activist
- Chi Onwurah, born 1965 – Labour politician
- Lembit Öpik, born 1965 – Liberal Democratic MP and local councillor
- Charles Parsons, 1854–1931 – engineer and inventor
- José Maria de Eça de Queiroz, 1845–1900 – diplomat and novelist ("the Portuguese Dickens")
- Michael Roberts, 1902–1948 – poet and critic
- Diana Ross, 1910–2000 – children's author (The Little Red Engine)
- Erik Routley, 1917–1982 – hymn writer
- William Bell Scott, 1811–1890 – poet and Pre-Raphaelite painter
- Freddy Shepherd, 1941–2017 – businessman and football club chairman
- Varada Sethu, born 1992 – actor
- Jon Silkin, 1930–1997 – poet
- Peter Smithson, 1928–1993 – Stockton-born Modernist architect
- John Snow, 1813–1858 – anaesthetist and founder of epidemiology
- James Calvert Spence, 1892–1954 – paediatrician
- W. T. Stead, 1849–1912 – journalist
- Algernon Charles Swinburne, 1837–1909 – poet
- Cecil Philip Taylor, 1929–1981 – playwright
- Gerald Vann, 1906–1963 – Roman Catholic theologian and philosopher
- Don Warrington, born 1951 – actor
- Bruce Welch, born 1941 – guitarist and singer
- Denise Welch, born 1958 – actress
- John Wesley, 1703–1791 – founder of Methodism
- Kevin Whately, born 1951 – actor
- Ludwig Wittgenstein, 1889–1951 – philosopher
- Yevgeny Zamyatin, 1884–1937 – Russian novelist, (We)
