= List of The Mr. Peabody & Sherman Show episodes =

This is a list of episodes of The Mr. Peabody & Sherman Show, the American animated web television series produced by DreamWorks Animation and Jay Ward Productions. It premiered on Netflix on October 9, 2015.

== Series overview ==
Season	Episodes	Originally released
1	13	October 9, 2015
2	13	March 18, 2016
3	13	October 21, 2016
4	13	April 21, 2017

== Episodes ==
=== Season 1 (2015) ===
No. overall	No. in season	Title	Directed by	Written by	Storyboarded by	Original release date
1	1	"The Perfect Show" "Napoleon"	John Sanford	Kara Lee Burk, John McCann, John Reynolds, Paul Rugg, Marco Schnabel & Matt Smith	Chris Allison, Ben Balistreri, Mike Bell, Careen Ingle & Miles Thompson	October 9, 2015
The Perfect Show: Mr. Peabody & Sherman attempt to host their first show, but their neighbors keep interrupting. Napoleon: During the Battle of Waterloo, Napoleon throws a temper tantrum over dessert as he wants to obtain some custard in order to make a dessert that would be named after him. Historical Figures: George Washington, Napoleon Bonaparte, Arthur Wellesley, 1st Duke of Wellington, Vladimir Zworykin, Nick-Nack the Caveman
2	2	"Stuck" "Mozart"	Greg Miller	Matt Smith & John T. Reynolds	Chris Allison & Careen Ingle	October 9, 2015
Stuck: When Mr. Peabody gets stuck in the elevator, Sherman has to perform the show on his own. Mozart: Peabody and Sherman help a young Mozart prepare for a big audition. Historical Figures: Matthew Dubourg, Johannes Gutenberg, Harry Houdini, Wolfgang Amadeus Mozart, Joseph II
3	3	"Sherman's Pet" "Marco Polo"	Mike Bell	Marco Schnabel & Matt Smith	Chad Coyle, Shellie Kvilvang-O'Brien, Howie Perry & Miles Thompson	October 9, 2015
Sherman's Pet: Sherman adopts a displaced woolly mammoth as a pet. Marco Polo: Mr. Peabody and Sherman convince Marco Polo to try a novel new food: noodles. Afterwards, they must learn how to make it before Marco Polo can bring it back to Europe. Historical Figures: Jackson Haines, Charles Darwin, Marco Polo
4	4	"Handcuffs for a Song" "Wright Brothers"	Greg Miller	Drew Massey, John McCann & Matt Smith	Chris Allison & Careen Ingle	October 9, 2015
Handcuffs for a Song: Christine handcuffs herself to Mr. Peabody so she can sing on the show. Wright Brothers: Mr. Peabody and Sherman help the Wright Brothers find their missing airplane. They soon discover that the local birds are responsible. Historical Figures: Edgar Allan Poe, Jules Léotard, Wright Brothers
5	5	"New Sponsor" "Cleopatra"	John Sanford	Drew Massey & Matt Smith	Miles Thompson	October 9, 2015
New Sponsor: Sherman makes a deal for the show to sponsor his favorite all-time pudding snack produced by the Guapo Brothers. Cleopatra: Mr. Peabody and Sherman help Cleopatra embrace her more "feminine" side and win over Julius Caesar so that he can help keep the throne from being taken by Ptolemy XIV. Historical Figures: Charles Dickens, Montezuma, Cleopatra, Ptolemy XIV, Julius Caesar Note: This episode was nominated for the 2015 Annie Award for Outstanding Achievement in Character Design for an Animated TV/Broadcast Production
6	6	"Black Hole" "Winston Churchill"	John Sanford	Marco Schnabel	Joshua Pruett & Miles Thompson	October 9, 2015
Black Hole: A black hole forms in the penthouse. Winston Churchill: Churchill runs away from his duties as Prime Minister after becoming a "big baby". Historical Figures: Laika, Carlo Gatti, Winston Churchill
7	7	"Big Boy" "Blackbeard"	Greg Miller	Dannah Phirman & Matt Smith	Chris Allison & Careen Ingle	October 9, 2015
Big Boy: Sherman babysits for his neighbors. Blackbeard: Peabody and Sherman help Blackbeard get his beard back from the pirate Bumblebeard, a pirate who has a beard made of bees. Historical Figures: Marquis de Lafayette, Betsy Ross, George Washington, Blackbeard
8	8	"Biggest Fan" "Queen Isabella"	Mike Bell	Kara Lee Burk & John T. Reynolds	Chad Coyle & Howie Perry	October 9, 2015
Biggest Fan: Shelby, Sherman's biggest fan, keeps interrupting the show. Queen Isabella: Just as Columbus leaves on his famous voyage, Queen Isabella falls for a scam and loses all of her money to con artist Roberto Ublindo. Historical Figures: King Kamehameha, Queen Isabella, Christopher Columbus
9	9	"Peabody's Parents" "Galileo"	Mike Bell	Kara Lee Burk & Matt Smith	Chad Coyle & Howie Perry	October 9, 2015
Peabody's Parents: Peabody's foster parents, Rex and Princess, drop in for an unexpected visit. Galileo: The duo take Galileo into outer space to prove that he is not the center of the universe. Historical Figures: Philippe Pinel, Samuel Osgood, Galileo, Copernicus Note: This episode won the 2015 Annie Award for Outstanding Achievement in Production Design for an Animated TV/Broadcast Production
10	10	"Patch Games" "Mark Twain"	Mike Bell	Drew Massey, Dannah Phirman & Marco Schnabel	Chad Coyle, Howie Perry & Joshua Pruett	October 9, 2015
Patch Games: Sherman and his friends earn their Laser Robot Tiger Trooper patches where King Agamemnon is among those helping out with the challenges. Mark Twain: Mr. Peabody and Sherman help Mark Twain retrieve his lucky typewriter. Historical Figures: Agamemnon, Sacagawea, Leonardo da Vinci, Benjamin Franklin, Mark Twain
11	11	"Favor for Christine" "Lady Godiva"	John Sanford	Kara Lee Burk, Matt Smith	Shellie Kvilvang-O'Brien, Bernie Petterson & Joshua Pruett	October 9, 2015
Favor for Christine: Christine tricks Mr. Peabody into helping her impress her twin sister that involves claiming that she hosts the show and doing an upcoming marriage to him. Lady Godiva: Peabody and Sherman help Lady Godiva find a horse for her famed ride through Coventry. Historical Figures: Lady Godiva, numerous historical figures from previous episodes.
12	12	"Medieval Fest" "John Sutter"	John Sanford	Kara Lee Burk & John T. Reynolds	Shellie Kvilvang-O'Brien & Jon Magram	October 9, 2015
Medieval Fest: Peabody and Sherman host a medieval European-themed episode. John Sutter: Instead of mining for gold, Sutter mines for pigs instead. Historical Figures: King Henry VIII, Lailoken, Joan of Arc, John Sutter Note: Dudley Do-Right and Horse make a cameo appearance together in the song Calfornada.
13	13	"Outbreak" "Ancient Greek Games"	Greg Miller	John T. Reynolds & Matt Smith	Chris Allison & Careen Ingle	October 9, 2015
Outbreak: The government quarantines the penthouse when everyone comes down with "pterodactyl flu". Ancient Greek Games: Peabody and Sherman lead some Greek athletes into challenging Zeus' team to an athletic competition. Historical Figures: Florence Nightingale Note: This is Bird Baby's first appearance.

=== Season 2 (2016) ===
No. overall	No. in season	Title	Directed by	Written by	Storyboarded by	Original release date
14	1	"Show on the Road" "Catherine the Great"	Greg Miller	John T. Reynolds & Matt Smith	Chris Allison & Careen Ingle	March 18, 2016
Show on the Road: Mr. Peabody invents a machine that can transport the whole penthouse to any location, but it malfunctions and they get stuck on the Moon where they encounter Bernadette Steel. Catherine the Great: Catherine's roller coaster breaks, and it is up to the duo to find her sister, who is the only one that can fix it. Historical Figures: Jose Bonilla, Catherine the Great
15	2	"Scrambled Eggs" "George Stephenson"	Mike Bell	Kara Lee Burk & John T. Reynolds	Chad Coyle & Howie Perry	March 18, 2016
Scrambled Eggs: Sherman and Boogaz have to take care of an egg for school. George Stephenson: Mr. Peabody and Sherman take the first ever train ride. Historical Figures: Sir Richard Owen, Amalie Materna, George Stephenson
16	3	"Big Top Peabody" "Taj Mahal"	Miles Thompson	Kara Lee Burk & Matt Smith	Bernie Petterson & Adam Rosette	March 18, 2016
Big Top Peabody: Peabody attempts to host the show without his glasses. Taj Mahal: Mr. Peabody tells the story of how they met Sweet Tune. Historical Figures: Galileo, John Townshend, P.T. Barnum, Ustad Ahmad Lahauri
17	4	"World Records" "Hotu Matu'a"	John Sanford	John T. Reynolds & Matt Smith	Shellie Kvilvang-O'Brien & Jon Magram	March 18, 2016
World Records: Sherman attempts to break a world record. Hotu Matu'a: The duo travels to Easter Island to find that the Moai statues are alive. Historical Figures: Benjamin Franklin, Hotu Matu'a
18	5	"Sherman From A to Zzzz" "Akashi Shiganosuke"	Greg Miller	Kara Lee Burk & John T. Reynolds	Chris Allison & Careen Ingle	March 18, 2016
Sherman From A to Zzzz: Sherman has trouble staying awake after watching a horror movie. Akashi Shiganosuke: Peabody and Sherman have to convince superstitious sumo wrestler Akashi Shiganosuke to get back in the ring. Historical Figures: John Newbery, Chief 'Broken Tooth' Kahdewahbeday, Akashi Shiganosuke
19	6	"Orchoptitron in Love" "John Harrington"	Miles Thompson	John T. Reynolds & Matt Smith	Bernie Petterson & Adam Rosette	March 18, 2016
Orchoptitron in Love: When Orchoptitron gets dumped, the gang helps him get a new girlfriend. John Harrington: Queen Elizabeth gets flushed down the toilet and Peabody, Sherman, and Harrington attempt to rescue her. Historical Figures: Leonardo da Vinci, Archytas of Tarentum, Nikola Tesla, Casanova, John Harrington, Elizabeth I of England Note: The third and final part of the time-travel story is a parody of the 1985 video game Super Mario Bros.; In addition, John Harrington's design in the episode resembles that of Mario.
20	7	"Inside Hobson" "Annie Oakley"	Mike Bell	Douglas Gauthier & Matt Smith	Chad Coyle & Howie Perry	March 18, 2016
Inside Hobson: Hobson swallows a tiny Sherman and Peabody has to rescue him, Fantastic Voyage-style. Annie Oakley: The duo helps a teenage Oakley when Billy the Kid steals her lucky water gun. Historical Figures: Gandhi, Annie Oakley, Billy the Kid Note: This is the first episode to the feature the Dreamworks Animation Television logo.
21	8	"Peabody's Diet" "Ponce de Leon"	John Sanford	Douglas Gauthier & John T. Reynolds	Jon Magram	March 18, 2016
Peabody's Diet: Mr. Peabody goes on a diet. Ponce de Leon: Ponce de León searches for the fountain of youth and is accidentally turned into an old man. Historical Figures: Marie Antionette, Dr. James Braid, Ponce de Leon
22	9	"Secret Agent Sherman" "Alexander Cartwright"	Mike Bell	Kara Lee Burk & John T. Reynolds	Chad Coyle & Howie Perry	March 18, 2016
Secret Agent Sherman: A sophisticated spy visits and shares his cool secret agent gadgets with Mr. Peabody. Alexander Cartwright: Cartwright invents baseball. Due to his poor sportsmanship, no one wants to play it with him. Oh, and let us not forget that he keeps changing the rules. Now Peabody and Sherman must set him right and correct the rules. Historical Figures: Mansfield Smith-Cumming, Alexander Cartwright
23	10	"Sherman Exchange Program" "Charles Dickens"	Miles Thompson	John T. Reynolds & Matt Smith	Bernie Petterson & Adam Rosette	March 18, 2016
Sherman Exchange Program: Sherman swaps places with an 11-year-old emperor from Ancient China for a day. Charles Dickens: Angry spirits keep Charles Dickens from finishing A Christmas Carol. Historical Figures: Fulin, Thomas Jefferson, Charles Dickens Note: The montage scene during the second part of the time-travel segment is a parody of Scooby-Doo, while the third part's first scene is a parody of Ghostbusters.
24	11	"Ruff Guyz" "George Crum"	Greg Miller	Kara Lee Burk, John T. Reynolds & Matt Smith	Chris Allison & Careen Ingle	March 18, 2016
Ruff Guys: Mr. Peabody tries to re-create his old band, The "Ruff Guyz". George Crum: Instead of selling potato chips at his restaurant, George Crum uses one to run for President. Historical Figures: Adolphe Sax, Wolfgang Amadeus Mozart, George Crum, Franklin Pierce, Millard Fillmore, James Madison, numerous historical figures from previous episodes.
25	12	"I Knew That Was Gonna Happen" "Sacagawea"	John Sanford	Kara Lee Burk & Matt Smith	Shellie Kvilvang-O'Brien & Jon Magram	March 18, 2016
I Knew That Was Gonna Happen: Nostradamus arrives in the present delivers a cryptic riddle on the show, throwing the duo and their neighbors into chaos. Sacagawea: Peabody and Sherman help Sacagawea track down Lewis and Clark. They soon find that they have been abducted by Bigfoot as the five of them end up in a race to the Pacific Ocean alongside their rivals from France and Spain. Historical Figures: Nostradamus, William Shakespeare, Sacagawea, Meriwether Lewis, William Clark
26	13	"The Perfect Show Again" "Aristophanes"	Miles Thompson	John T. Reynolds & Marco Schnabel	Adam Rosette & Miles Thompson	March 18, 2016
As Peabody tells a time-travel story of how he and Sherman help Aristophanes track down his comedy muse, he finds himself dealing with the various historical figures from previous time-travel adventure stories that petition the show's cancellation on the grounds that Peabody's time travels do more harm than good. Examples being Napoleon claiming that he is addicted to his new dessert which caused him to lose his teeth, Julius Caesar stalking Cleopatra, and Mark Twain picking up a Voodoo product that caused him to get another head. With Nick-Nack the Caveman acting as the historical figures' lawyer, Peabody and Sherman take the historical figures to observe their past selves helping Aristophanes only to cause a temporal disturbance with Peabody and Sherman returning to their time to find themselves in a dystopian society ruled by a cyborg version of their show's notary Mrs. Hughes. Historical Figures: Aristophanes, and nearly every historical figure from the previous time travel stories. Notes: Due to a discrepancy between production and airing schedules, this episode, in spite of releasing as the second season finale, is said to be the first season finale. By proxy, Seasons 3 and 4 presumably count as "Season 2".

=== Season 3 (2016) ===
No. overall	No. in season	Title	Directed by	Written by	Storyboarded by	Original release date
27	1	"The Wrath of Hughes"	Greg Miller	John T. Reynolds, Marco Schnabel & Matt Smith	Careen Ingle & Greg Miller	October 21, 2016
Continuing from the last episode, Peabody tells his show's audience a time-travel story of how he and Sherman's meddling with their past selves helping Aristophanes created an alternate timeline ruled by a cyborg Mrs. Hughes, working with an alternate and older version of past Peabody to depose Hughes and restore the timeline.
28	2	"Jump the Whale Shark" "Frédéric Bartholdi"	Greg Miller	Mike Leffingwell, John T. Reynolds & Marco Schnabel	Careen Ingle & George Kaprielian	October 21, 2016
Jump The Whale Shark: When the penthouse is made into a beach, Sherman takes the chance to beat a rival in a contest and impress a girl. Frédéric Bartholdi: With help from Peabody and Sherman, Frédéric Bartholdi must learn to stand up to his overbearing mother if he is ever going to become a sculptor. Historical Guest: Anna Thynne, Benjamin Franklin, Poseidon, Frédéric Bartholdi
29	3	"Pea Dummy" "Mary Anning"	Miles Thompson	Mike Leffingwell, John T. Reynolds, Marco Schnabel & Matt Smith	Melody Iza & Adam Rosette	October 21, 2016
Pea Dummy: Peabody scores surprisingly low on an IQ Test and begins to question his reputation as a genius. Mary Anning: Peabody meets his intellectual match in Mary Anning, the world's first female paleontologist, as they struggle to survive in the Age of Dinosaurs. Historical Figures: William Stern, Eugen Sandow, Mary Anning
30	4	"Climate Control" "Ziryab"	Miles Thompson	Eric Acosta, Mike Leffingwell & John T. Reynolds	Melody Iza & Adam Rosette	October 21, 2016
Climate Control: Peabody and Sherman gain a new climate controlling device for the penthouse, but are unable to settle on a temperature, leading to a storm of trouble. Ziryab: Peabody and Sherman must help distracted designer Ziryab hold his focus and create a design for a royal wedding. Historical Figures: Robert FitzRoy, Ziryab
31	5	"Brain Switch" "Koikawa Harumachi"	Mike Bell	Mike Leffingwell & Matt Smith	Chad Coyle & Howie Perry	October 21, 2016
Brain Switch: Sherman is tired of being a kid, so he and Peabody swap brains so he can be an adult, but things quickly go off-kilter when everyone starts switching. Koikawa Harumachi: Koikawa Harumachi, the creator of the comic book, has trouble reigning in his overactive imagination and unleashes a literary monster into the real world. Historical Figures: Leif Erikson, W. S. Gilbert, Arthur Sullivan, Koikawa Harumachi Note: There is a moment where Mr. Peabody appears in his 1960 design.
32	6	"Super Sherman" "Ada Lovelace"	John Sanford	Mike Leffingwell & John T. Reynolds	Jon Magram & Mike Stern	October 21, 2016
Super Sherman: Sherman touches a meteor that crashes into the penthouse and gains mysterious superpowers. When word gets out, the building inhabitants decide to get supercharged as well. Ada Lovelace: Mathematical genius Ada Lovelace must get help from Peabody to fix up her disorganized life if she is ever to help Charles Babbage create the world's first computer. Historical Figures: Hypatia, William Herschel, Ada Lovelace, Charles Babbage
33	7	"Mouse Hunt" "David Bushnell"	John Sanford	Mike Leffingwell & Matt Smith	Jon Magram & Mike Stern	October 21, 2016
Mouse Hunt: Peabody and Sherman have cleaned the penthouse from top to bottom, but a mouse is soon found running about, making Peabody's skin crawl. Peabody and Sherman try various ways to get rid of the mouse ranging from Saint Patrick using his snakes to Sherman setting off Peabody by getting a cat to do the job. David Bushnell: Peabody and Sherman join David Bushnell, the inventor of the submarine that is supposed to be brought to George Washington, on an undersea journey to find a sea monster. Though they discover a plot by the British army to invade the 13 colonies from underwater. Historical Figures: Joseph Lister, Saint Patrick, David Bushnell, George Washington
34	8	"Sweet Little Lies" "Allan Pinkerton"	Mike Bell	Nate Federman & Matt Smith	Chad Coyle & Howie Perry	October 21, 2016
Sweet Little Lies: Peabody uses a shock collar to teach Sherman that honesty is the best policy when Sherman begins to fall into a lying spree, though shockingly, he needs a lesson himself. Allan Pinkerton: Allan Pinkerton, the founder of private eyes, is called to solve a mystery of stolen diamonds, but needs help from Peabody and Sherman to reign in his impatience first. Historical Figures: Vincent van Gogh, a young George Washington, Allan Pinkerton Note: Allan Pinkerton's design is that of a film noir detective.
35	9	"Tree House" "Queen Hatshepsut"	John Sanford	Mike Leffingwell & Matt Smith	Jon Magram & Mike Stern	October 21, 2016
Tree House: Sherman wants to build a treehouse and with a little faith and help from Johnny Appleseed, grows a forest in the penthouse to make it happen. Queen Hatshepsut: Superficial and self-absorbed Queen Hatshepsut opens the world's first zoo, but Peabody and Sherman must help her take proper care of the animals to make it a success. Historical Figures: Johnny Appleseed, John Muir, Queen Hatshepsut
36	10	"This Is Your Life?" "Robert Edwin Peary"	Miles Thompson	Mike Leffingwell	Melody Iza & Adam Rosette	October 21, 2016
This Is Your Life?: Hobson is chosen as Sherman's role model much to Peabody's disappointment. When it is revealed that Hobson has done nothing with his life, Sherman and Peabody help him cross items off his bucket list. Robert Edwin Peary: Robert Peary's expedition to the North Pole takes a detour into Santa Claus's secret workshop thanks to his overzealous pranking. Historical Figures: Christopher Marlowe, Abby Fisher, Robert Edwin Peary
37	11	"Telethon" "Enrico Caruso"	Greg Miller	John T. Reynolds & Matt Smith	Careen Ingle & George Kaprielian	October 21, 2016
Telethon: Sherman turns the show into a telethon so he can raise money for his school library - and also win a prize. Enrico Caruso: When people accuse famed opera star Enrico Caruso of causing the Great San Francisco Earthquake, Peabody steps in to prove his innocence and find the real cause of the earthquake. Historical Figures: Francisco Romero, George Washington, Benjamin Franklin, Thomas Jefferson, other U.S. Presidents, Charles Darwin, Enrico Caruso
38	12	"Spooktacular" "Nicolas-Joseph Cugnot"	Mike Bell	John T. Reynolds, Marco Schnabel & Matt Smith	Chad Coyle & Howie Perry	October 21, 2016
Spooktacular: On the latest of Peabody's series of spooky specials, Sherman and Peabody drink a sinister concoction that turns them into monsters. Nicolas-Joseph Cugnot: Cugnot, the inventor of the world's first automobile, is also the world's first reckless driver. Peabody and Sherman must help him control his ego and teach him to drive. Historical Figures: Johann Konrad Dippel, David Thompson, Nicolas-Joseph Cugnot
39	13	"Return of the Guapos" "Lucy Walker"	Greg Miller	Mike Leffingwell, John T. Reynolds, Marco Schnabel & Matt Smith	Careen Ingle & George Kaprielian	October 21, 2016
Return of the Guapos: The Guapos return steal Peabody and Sherman's audience and makes them get their show canceled. Lucy Walker: Peabody and Sherman help Lucy Walker climb a mountain.

=== Season 4 (2017) ===
No. overall	No. in season	Title	Directed by	Written by	Storyboarded by	Original release date
40	1	"Return of the Guapos Part 2"	John Sanford	Mike Leffingwell, John T. Reynolds, Marco Schnabel & Matt Smith	Jon Magram & Mike Stern	April 21, 2017
Continuing from the last episode, Peabody and Sherman lose their home and show to the Guapo brothers. Six months later, Peabody gets a chance to win everything back from the Guapos on the condition of cleaning up the brothers' mess as they foolishly brought historical villains Jesse James, Belle Star, and Genghis Khan to the present. But Sherman's time away from the show allowed him to fully embrace his childhood. Historical Figures: Jesse James, Belle Starr, and Genghis Khan Note: Mr Peabody's quote "Quiet you" is a reference to his and Sherman's appearance in The Simpsons episode Treehouse of Horror V.
41	2	"Return of the Guapos Part 3"	John Sanford	Mike Leffingwell, John T. Reynolds, Marco Schnabel & Matt Smith	Jon Magram & Mike Stern	April 21, 2017
Continuing from the last episode, Peabody is forced to stop the historical villains from literally stealing the Federal Reserve Bank on his own while Sherman goes to a birthday party. Historical Figures: Jesse James, Belle Starr, and Genghis Khan Note: The parade balloons that the outlaws use to steal the Federal Reserve Bank are balloons of Rocky and Bullwinkle.
42	3	"Magic Hiccups" "Gaius Maecenas"	Mike Bell	Mike Leffingwell, John T. Reynolds & Matt Smith	Chad Coyle & Howie Perry	April 21, 2017
Magic Hiccups: Peabody and Sherman ditch technology for their show on Colonial America, but may need a present-day solution when Sherman messes with Sweet Tune's magic flute. Gaius Maecenas: Hedonist Gaius Maecenas wants to throw a pool party with the world's first heated swimming pool, but finds himself short of water. Historical Figures: Paul Revere, Mary Eastey, Gaius Maecenas, Emperor Nero
43	4	"Sherman's Tooth" "Voyager Gold Record"	John Sanford & David P. Smith	Mike Leffingwell, John T. Reynolds & Marco Schnabel	Jon Magram & Mike Stern	April 21, 2017
Sherman's Tooth: Sherman has a loose tooth and tries various methods to get it out on his own, but Peabody believes the world's first dentist can be of greater help. Voyager Gold Record: Peabody and Sherman along with a nerdy scientist named Eunice Butters search a 1970s disco club to find the stolen Golden Record for NASA's launch of the Voyager 2. Historical Figures: John Baker, Cyrano de Bergerac, Jimmy Carter
44	5	"Gone Comic Gone" "Harry Houdini"	Miles Thompson	Mike Leffingwell, Marco Schnabel & Matt Smith	Melody Iza & Adam Rosette	April 21, 2017
Gone Comic Gone: Peabody's musical spectacular on the Dewey Decimal System takes a backseat when Sherman launches a paranoia-fueled investigation to find a missing comic book. Harry Houdini: Master illusionist Harry Houdini learns the art of restraint from Peabody and Sherman when he gets too carried away in showing off his magic act. Historical Figures: Robert Peel, Harry Houdini, Tomás de Torquemada
45	6	"P-Bro" "First Canine Police Force"	Greg Miller	Mike Leffingwell, John T. Reynolds & Matt Smith	Careen Ingle & George Kaprielian	April 21, 2017
P-Bro: Agamemnon brings his fraternity from ancient Greece to the show on their way to a Spring Break party and Peabody is determined to join them, despite his show on good manners involving Philip Stanhope. First Canine Police Force: Peabody's overly-strict Uncle Duke gains some help from his distant nephew in softening up and leading the first Canine Police Force to stopping "John the Ripper" from gassing up London with his flatulence. Historical Figures: Agamemnon, Philip Stanhope, 4th Earl of Chesterfield
46	7	"Cheerleaders" "Mansa Musa"	Mike Bell	Mike Leffingwell & Matt Smith	Chad Coyle & Howie Perry	April 21, 2017
Cheerleaders: Sherman gets hypercompetitive in rallying together a team composed of Boogaz, Wheels, and Hobson during Peabody's historical disease show to beat his old rival Blaine and win a cheerleading competition. Mansa Musa: Africa's wealthiest emperor Mansa Musa cannot stop his frivolous spending spree, so Peabody and Sherman help him learn to use his money wisely to build the first school. Historical Figures: John Caius, Johnny Campbell, Mansa Musa
47	8	"Bring Your Kids to Work Day" "Leif Erikson"	John Sanford, David P. Smith & Miles Thompson	Mike Leffingwell & Matt Smith	Melody Iza & Adam Rosette	April 21, 2017
Bring Your Kids To Work Day: It's "Bring Your Kid To Work Day" on the show with Peabody and neighbors finding themselves in over their heads when Sherman's act of calling in the grandparents allows the other kids to cause chaos in the studio. Leif Erikson: Peabody and Sherman must help Leif Erikson discard his refined tastes and etiquette if he is to become the ruthless Viking that will lead an expedition to the New World and keep Odin from destroying it. Historical Figures: Henry E. Steinway, J. P. Morgan, Leif Erikson
48	9	"Orchopti-NOT-ron" "Mulan"	David P. Smith	Mike Leffingwell, John T. Reynolds & Matt Smith	Melody Iza & Adam Rosette & Careen Ingle	April 21, 2017
Orchopti-NOT-ron: Number #1 fan Maria takes it upon herself to host the show while Peabody and Sherman accidentally teleport themselves inside of a short-circuiting Orchoptitron. Mulan: Christine's meddling threatens to stand in the way of Mulan's destiny to take her ill father's place in the Chinese army and Peabody's meddling is not helping. Historical Figures: Hua Mulan Note: This is the first episode where someone else reads the time travel adventure instead of Mr. Peabody
49	10	"The Show's the Thing" "Peter Cooper"	Greg Miller	Mike Leffingwell & Matt Smith	Careen Ingle & George Kaprielian	April 21, 2017
The Show's The Thing: Peabody invites famed playwright William Shakespeare to give a production of his famous play Romeo and Juliet, but he refuses to cast Peabody in the starring role. Peter Cooper: Boring inventor Peter Cooper gets advice from Peabody to put some life into his new gelatin, but he takes it a little too literally, turning 1845 New York into a real-life horror movie. Historical Figures: William Shakespeare, Christopher Marlowe, Peter Cooper Note: The time travel sequence is a parody of The Blob.
50	11	"Peabody's Delivery" "Joe vs. the Peabody and Sherman"	Greg Miller	Mike Leffingwell & Matt Smith	Careen Ingle & George Kaprielian	April 21, 2017
Peabody's Delivery: Peabody's eagerness to open a surprise package during their Australia show leads to things getting wild when an angry koala eats an aboriginal guide. Joe vs. the Peabody & Sherman: Joe Troplong, the persistent sausage maker from 1962 who inspired Peabody to build the WABAC, gains amnesia when Mr. Peabody and Sherman decide to meet him and becomes a Vegas lounge singer, putting the future of time travel at risk. Historical Figures: Mokare Minang
51	12	"Seen It" "Edgar Allan Poe"	Mike Bell	Mike Leffingwell, John T. Reynolds & Marco Schnabel	Chad Coyle & Howie Perry	April 21, 2017
Seen It: Peabody and Sherman are pushed out of their comfort zones when a nasty heckler in the audience begins to constantly complain that the show has become predictable, forcing them to attempt more original programming that only worsens their situation. Edgar Allan Poe: Famous horror writer Edgar Allan Poe has become happy and cheerful after falling in love with a bird, so Peabody and Sherman must break this relationship up so Poe can tap his inner darkness and complete "The Raven". Historical Figures: Timothy Matlack, Edgar Allan Poe Note: Edgar Allan Poe acting happy is a reference to the Time Squad episode, "Every Poe Has a Silver Lining".
52	13	"The Perfect Perfect Show Again Again" "Abraham Lincoln"	John Sanford & David P. Smith	Mike Leffingwell & Matt Smith	Jon Magram & Mike Stern	April 21, 2017
The Perfect Perfect Show Again Again: In the series finale (though it's stressed by the cast that it's only the last episode of the season), Peabody's insistence to celebrate history's famous lasts causes him to have a falling out with the neighbors as they were lobbying a live performance. Peabody eventually makes peace with his neighbors upon realizing his mistake as they end the show with an epic musical number. The penthouse then blows up, leaving everybody in it floating in space as the credits roll. Abraham Lincoln: In Sherman's nonsensical retelling of this adventure, Abraham Lincoln is trying to get to Gettysburg before he shrinks, but does not have the address. Historical Figures: Ludwig van Beethoven, Liliuokalani, Nostradamus, Joseph Pulitzer, Stamatios Masouris, Martha, George Armstrong Custer, Abraham Lincoln Note: The feature musical number at the end of the episode is "Only a Minute" by The Family Crest, which was written specially for this show.
