= The Mr. Peabody & Sherman Show =

American animated streaming television series

- Genre: Comedy; Jukebox musical History
- Based on: Peabody's Improbable History by Ted Key
- Developed by: David P. Smith
- Directed by: John Sanford; Greg Miller; Mike Bell; Miles Thompson
- Voices of: Chris Parnell; Max Charles; Da'Vine Joy Randolph; Dieter Jansen; Sunil Malhotra; David P. Smith; Josh Keaton; Kari Wahlgren
- Theme music composer: Eric Goldman; Michael Corcoran
- Opening theme: "The Mr. Peabody & Sherman Show Theme Song"
- Composer: The Outfit
- Country of origin: United States
- No. of seasons: 4
- No. of episodes: 52 (list of episodes)

Production
- Executive producers: David P. Smith; Tiffany Ward
- Producers: Rob Minkoff; Jim Corbett
- Running time: 23 minutes
- Production companies: Jay Ward Productions; DreamWorks Animation Television

Original release
- Network: Netflix
- Release: October 9, 2015 – April 21, 2017

Related
- The Adventures of Rocky and Bullwinkle

The Mr. Peabody & Sherman Show is an American animated jukebox musical comedy television series produced by DreamWorks Animation Television and Jay Ward Productions. The series is based on "Peabody's Improbable History", the 1960s segments that aired as part of The Adventures of Rocky and Bullwinkle and Friends, and the 2014 film, Mr. Peabody & Sherman, which was also produced by DreamWorks Animation. The series premiered on October 9, 2015, on Netflix. The second season was released on March 18, 2016. The third season was released on October 21, 2016. The fourth and final season was released on April 21, 2017. The series was removed from Netflix on April 21, 2023. As of March 2026, the show is now streaming on Kidoodle.TV along with various other shows from DreamWorks Animation Television.

The series is digitally hand-drawn, with the Vancouver-based DHX Media providing the animation. Mr. Peabody is voiced by Chris Parnell, while Max Charles reprises his role as Sherman from the film. Originally, according to The Animation Guild, 78 episodes of the television series were ordered, but only 52 episodes were aired.

== Synopsis ==
Mr. Peabody and his son Sherman host a live TV variety show out of their Manhattan penthouse, with various historical figures as their guests that are brought to them through the WABAC time machine. Half of the show is in a variety show format, with the other half being time travel adventures formatted like the original "Peabody's Improbable History" segments from the 1950s and 1960s.

This show also introduces new characters like the robotic Orchoptitron, the building manager Mr. Hobson, the notary Mrs. Hughes, and Peabody's downstairs neighbors Christine Bluestone and the Yakamora family. The janitor Old Bill also appears where he is mostly seen during the credits.

Although the series is set three years after the events of Mr. Peabody & Sherman (2014), there is no mention of that films' events nor do the characters Penny Peterson, Paul Peterson, Patty Peterson or Edwina Grunion make an appearance.

== Episodes ==
Season	Episodes	Originally released
1	13	October 9, 2015
2	13	March 18, 2016
3	13	October 21, 2016
4	13	April 21, 2017

== Voice cast ==
=== Main ===
- Chris Parnell as Hector J. Peabody
- Max Charles as Sherman
- Da'Vine Joy Randolph as Christine Bluestone, Abby Fisher
- Dieter Jansen as Mr. Calvert Hobson, Bird Baby
- Sunil Malhotra as Sweet Tune Swami
- David P. Smith as Mrs. Arugula Hughes, Orchoptitron, and Orville Wright
- Josh Keaton as Mr. Yakamora, Josh Guapo, Wilbur Wright, others
- Kari Wahlgren as Mrs. Yakamora, Maria Garcia, Annie Oakley, Joan of Arc, Queen Elizabeth I, Hatshepsut, Ada Lovelace, Lucy Walker, Pinkbeard (in "Blackbeard"), others

=== Special guest stars ===
- Brian Baumgartner as Hotu Matu'a
- Flula Borg as Joe Troplong
- Gary Busey as Alternate Future Mr. Peabody
- Margaret Cho as Hua Mulan
- Bob Dorough as James Madison
- Stephen Fry as Uncle Duke
- Jared Harris as Bigfoot
- Daniel Henney as Akashi Shiganosuke
- Jane Lynch as Bernadette Steel
- Missi Pyle as Catherine the Great (1st Time)
- Jeff Ross as Aristophanes
- Fred Stoller as Peter Cooper
- Reggie Watts as Rejgie

=== Guest stars ===
- Carlos Alazraqui as Ponce de Leon
- Dee Bradley Baker as Wolfgang Amadeus Mozart
- Eric Bauza as Galileo
- Michael Patrick Bell as Santa Claus
- Jeff Bennett as Abraham Lincoln, Mark Twain, Vladimir K. Zworykin, Joseph Lister, Saint Patrick, Roberto Ublindo
- Steve Blum as Jules Léotard, Edgar Allan Poe
- Flula Borg as Joe Troplong
- Eric Bradley as Julio Iglesias
- Grey DeLisle as Cleopatra, Mary Anning
- Terry Dexter as Joan of Arc
- Richard Epcar as Julius Caesar
- Daniel Henney as Akashi Shiganosuke
- Kate Higgins as Belle Starr
- Danny Jacobs as Enrico Caruso
- Grace Kaufman as Boogaz
- Tom Kenny as Blackbeard, Nicolas-Joseph Cugnot, George Washington (in "David Bushnell")
- Andrew Kishino as Koikawa Harumachi
- Evan Kishiyama as Payton
- Abigail Zoe Lewis as Shelby
- Yuri Lowenthal as Baby Kenny
- Tress MacNeille as Florence Nightingale, Oracle
- Marsai Martin as Anissa
- Melanie Minichino as Queen Isabella
- Dave B. Mitchell as Frédéric Auguste Bartholdi
- Mark Moseley as King Agamemnon
- Daran Norris as Allan Pinkerton
- Nolan North as Marco Polo, John Sutter
- Farris Patton as Lady Godiva
- Rob Paulsen as Pirate
- Kevin Michael Richardson as Bumblebeard (in "Blackbeard")
- Paul Rugg as Napoleon
- Joshua Rush as Wheels
- Tara Strong as Catherine the Great (2nd time)
- Fred Tatasciore as José Guapo, Leif Erikson, John Sutter, David Bushnell, Robert Peary, Winston Churchill, Nostradamus
- Albert Tsai as Kid
- Michael-Leon Wooley as George Crum, Ziryab

=== Musical guests ===
In some episodes there is a musical guest.

- Wordsworth & Prince Paul in Stuck/Mozart
- Jukebox the Ghost in Black Hole/Winston Churchill
- Ra Ra Riot in Peabody's Parents/Galileo
- JD McPherson in Outbreak/Ancient Greek Games
- Katie Herzig in World Records/Hotu Matu'a
- JD Sampson in Telethon/Enrico Caruso
- Hammered Satin in Peabody's Delivery/Joe vs. the Peabody and Sherman
- The Family Crest in The Perfect Perfect Show Again Again/Abraham Lincoln

== Production ==
Chris Parnell replaced Ty Burrell as the voice of Mr. Peabody from the 2014 film Mr. Peabody & Sherman. He auditioned for the role about a year and a half before the series' premiere. Trying to replicate Bill Scott's voice from the original cartoons as close as possible, he prepared by watching the 1960s show, and ended up doing his own interpretation of the character.

== Soundtrack ==
The Mr. Peabody and Sherman Show (Original Soundtrack)

Film score by Eric Goldman and Michael Corcoran (musician) (aka The Outfit)
- Released: October 2, 2015 (Digital); December, 2015 (CD)
- Length: 32:41
- Label: Lakeshore Records

A soundtrack for the first season of the series was released digitally on October 2, 2015, and was released on CD in December 2015. Published by Lakeshore Records, the album features original score and the opening theme song by Eric Goldman and Michael Corcoran (aka The Outfit), and new original songs by Jukebox the Ghost, JD McPherson, Wordsworth and Prince Paul, and Ra Ra Riot., along with original songs performed by the cast of the series.

No.	Title	Music	Length
1.	"Peabody and Sherman Theme Song"	The Outfit	0:36
2.	"Firsts Song"	Greg Whipple, Chris Parnell & Max Charles	0:43
3.	"Through the Battle of Waterloo"	The Outfit	0:25
4.	"Cooking the Caveman Way"	The Outfit	0:40
5.	"Ferris Wheel"	Wordsworth & Prince Paul	2:51
6.	"How to Be a Kid"	The Outfit	0:41
7.	"Mozart's Remix Suite"	The Outfit	0:57
8.	"Christine's Song"	Da'Vine Joy Randolph	1:07
9.	"Wright Brothers Suite"	The Outfit	1:32
10.	"Taco Pudding"	Max Charles & Chris Parnell	0:35
11.	"Laika Rap"	Max Charles & Chris Parnell	0:45
12.	"Churchill Suite"	The Outfit	1:53
13.	"Black Hole"	Jukebox the Ghost	2:38
14.	"Time to Get Colonial"	The Outfit	1:30
15.	"Back Together"	Zachary Hexum & Lauren Vogel	0:26
16.	"The Kraken Suite"	The Outfit	0:52
17.	"Bumblebeard"	Pirate Cast	0:56
18.	"The Gang Runs with the Bulls"	The Outfit	1:00
19.	"Captain Robert Falcon Scott"	Ra Ra Riot	2:34
20.	"Mark Twain Suite"	The Outfit	1:11
21.	"Here Comes the Bride Remix"	The Outfit	0:42
22.	"Wedding Day"	Max Charles, Chris Parnell & Da'Vine Joy Randolph	1:15
23.	"In the Windmill"	The Outfit	0:57
24.	"John Sutter Suite"	The Outfit	0:54
25.	"Aerobics Song"	Max Charles & Chris Parnell	0:49
26.	"Californada Interlude"	Randy Crenshaw	0:17
27.	"Let the Games Begin"	The Outfit	0:31
28.	"Take It to the Top"	Jess Harnell	0:53
29.	"Crazy Horse"	JD McPherson	2:00
30.	"See Ya Next Time"	The Outfit	0:31
Total length:			32:41

== Accolades ==
Year	Award	Category	Nominee	Result
2016	Annie Awards	Outstanding Achievement, Character Design in an Animated TV/Broadcast Production	Chris Mitchell and Keiko Murayama (for "New Sponsor/ Cleopatra")	Nominated
2016	Annie Awards	Outstanding Achievement, Production Design in an Animated TV/Broadcast Production	Kevin Dart, Sylvia Liu, Chris Turnham and Eastwood Wong (for "Peabody's Parents/Galileo")	Won
2016	Daytime Emmy Awards	Outstanding Children's Animated Program		Nominated
2016	Daytime Emmy Awards	Outstanding Directing in an Animated Program	Mike Bell, Greg Miller, John Sanford	Nominated
2017	Annie Awards	Outstanding Achievement, Production Design in an Animated Television Broadcast Production	Kevin Dart, Sylvia Liu, Chris Turnham and Eastwood Wong (for "The Wrath of Hughes")	Nominated
2017	Annie Awards	Outstanding Achievement, Voice Acting in an Animated Television/Broadcast Production	Carlos Alazraqui (for "Ponce de León")	Won
2017	Daytime Emmy Awards	Outstanding Children's Animated Program		Nominated
2017	Daytime Emmy Awards	Outstanding Directing in an Animated Program	Greg Miller	Nominated
2017	Daytime Emmy Awards	Outstanding Original Song	Katie Herzig ("Morse Code") (for "World Records")	Nominated
2017	Daytime Emmy Awards	Outstanding Individual Achievement in Animation	Kevin Dart, art director (for "The Wrath Of Hughes")	Won
2017	Daytime Emmy Awards	Outstanding Individual Achievement in Animation	Eastwood Wong, background painter (for "Pea Dummy/Mary Anning")	Won
