= Katherine E. Oler =

American judge (born 1972)

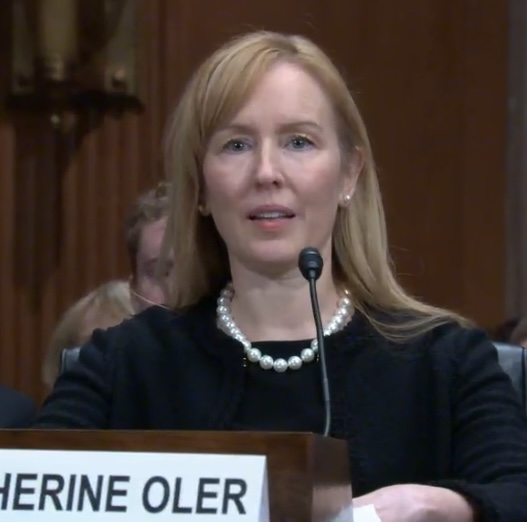

Judge of the Superior Court of the District of Columbia
- Incumbent
- Assumed office July 29, 2024
- Appointed by: Joe Biden
- Preceded by: John M. Campbell

Personal details
- Born: Katherine Ellsworth Oler; March 2, 1972 (age 54) Washington, D.C., U.S.
- Education: Wellesley College (BA); Boston University (JD)

Katherine Ellsworth Oler (born March 2, 1972) is an American lawyer who has served as an associate judge of the Superior Court of the District of Columbia since 2024. She previously served as a court-appointed special master for the United States Court of Federal Claims from 2017 to 2024.

== Education ==
Oler received a Bachelor of Arts in English and political science from Wellesley College in 1993; while at Wellesley she was awarded a first-year distinction for academic excellence. She received a Juris Doctor from Boston University School of Law in 1996. She also graduated from the Army's 51st Military Judges Course, where she was named the top graduate.

== Career ==
From 1996 to 2017, Oler served as an Air Force Judge Advocate, retiring from active duty as a colonel. From 2008 to 2011, she served as deputy chief trial judge of the Air Force. From 2012 to 2014, she served as Staff Judge Advocate at Randolph Air Force Base in Texas. From 2014 to 2017, she was the Force's chief prosecutor and chief government appellate counsel at Joint Base Andrews in Maryland. She was court-appointed as a special master of the United States Court of Federal Claims from November 29, 2017 to July 29, 2024. She presided over cases brought pursuant to the National Childhood Vaccine Injury Act.

=== D.C. superior court service ===
In March 2023, Oler was one of three people recommended by the District of Columbia Judicial Nomination Commission to fill the vacancy left by the retirement of Judge John M. Campbell. On June 28, 2023, President Joe Biden announced his intent to nominate Oler to serve as an associate judge of the Superior Court of the District of Columbia. On July 11, 2023, her nomination was sent to the Senate. President Biden nominated Oler to the seat vacated by Judge John M. Campbell, who retired on May 19, 2023. On September 21, 2023, a hearing on her nomination was held before the Senate Homeland Security and Governmental Affairs Committee. On September 27, 2023, her nomination was reported out of the committee by a 7–2 vote.

On January 3, 2024, her nomination was returned to the president under Rule XXXI, Paragraph 6 of the United States Senate. She was renominated on January 11, 2024. On January 31, 2024, her nomination was reported out of committee by a 9–3 vote. On June 17, 2024, the Senate invoked cloture on her nomination by a 50–39 vote. On June 18, 2024, her nomination was confirmed by a 52–42 vote. She was sworn in on July 29, 2024.

Legal offices
Preceded by John M. Campbell	Associate Judge of the Superior Court of the District of Columbia; 2024–present	Incumbent
