= Jack Campbell =

Jack Campbell may refer to:

- Jack Campbell (golfer) (1878–1955), Scottish golfer
- Jack M. Campbell (1916–1999), American politician
- Jackie Campbell (footballer, born 1922) (1922–2007), English footballer, see List of Oldham Athletic A.F.C. players (25–99 appearances)
- Jackie Campbell (born 1946), Scottish footballer for Partick Thistle
- Jack Campbell (author) (born 1956), pseudonym of American science fiction author John G. Hemry
- Jack Campbell (actor) (born 1970), Australian actor
- Jack Campbell (politician), American prosecutor and politician
- Jack Campbell (cricketer) (born 1999), English cricketer
- Jack Campbell (ice hockey) (born 1992), American ice hockey goaltender
- Jack Campbell (American football) (born 2000), American football player
- Jack Campbell (Sioux Indian), led an attack against Mankato, Minnesota Territory, see Department of the Northwest

== See also ==
- John Campbell (disambiguation)
