= Martin Kenneavy =

- Died: c. 1890; Newcastle upon Tyne, England, United Kingdom
- Occupation: Piper
- Spouse: A daughter of Patrick R. Bohan

Martin Kenneavy (died c. 1890) was an Irish piper.

== Life ==
Kenneavy or Kinneavy is a very rare Irish surname, found exclusively in County Galway in the mid-19th century. Only two are lists in Griffith's Valuation, both in Galway.

Of this musician, Francis O'Neill recorded that a Mr. Flanagan said he was:

"The best piper I ever heard used neither drone nor regulator – merely the chanter. He must have commenced as a child, so inimitable was his execution."

Kenneavy served for six years in either the 9th Queen's Royal Lancers or the 12th Royal Lancers. After the end of his service, he married one of the daughters of Patrick R. Bohan, a fellow-piper.

Mr. Flanagan further related that

"In 1887, after a long absence from my native land, I heard him play in Gibney's tavern, at the top of Knockmaroon hill, Phoenix Park, and from him I picked up some fine tunes."

Kenneavy died in Newcastle upon Tyne, England, about 1890.

== See also ==
- List of bagpipers
- List of people from Newcastle upon Tyne
