= Johnny Campbell (footballer, born 1923) =

Northern Irish footballer and gaelic footballer (1923–1968)

This article relates to the Irish footballer. For others, see John Campbell.

John Peter Campbell (28 June 1923 – January 1968) was a footballer from Derry, Northern Ireland.

== Career ==
Campbell grew up playing Gaelic football at school. He was also an accomplished sprinter, and an Ulster champion over 100 and 200 metres. He first played football for Foyle Harps, before being signed-up by Derry City, and from there he moved to Belfast Celtic in 1945. At 'Paradise', Campbell won Irish League and Irish Cup winner's medals, as well as representing the Irish League. Perhaps his most famous contribution to the club's history was scoring both goals in a 2–0 win over Scotland during Celtic's swansong tour of America.

By the time of the US Tour, Campbell had already departed Belfast Celtic for Fulham. He played in 62 league games for Fulham before his career was ended by injury early in the 1952–53 season. During his time in London he earned two caps, and indeed his wing-play earned praise from the maestro himself, Stanley Matthews.

When his career ended, Campbell returned to Belfast to work as a scout for Fulham. He died from bowel cancer at the young age of 44. Inadvertently, Campbell's death brought a brief return of football to 'Paradise', a Belfast Celtic Select playing a benefit match which raised £800 for his family.
