= Johnny Campbell =

Johnny Campbell may refer to:

- Johnny Campbell (bushranger) (1846–1880), Indigenous Australian bushranger
- John Campbell (footballer, born 1870) (1870–1906), Scottish footballer for Renton, Sunderland, Newcastle United
- John Campbell (footballer, born 1872) (1872–1947), Scottish footballer for Celtic, Aston Villa, Third Lanark, Scotland
- John Campbell (footballer, born 1877) (1877–1919), Scottish footballer for Blackburn Rovers, Partick Thistle, Rangers, Hibernian, Scotland
- Johnny Campbell (footballer, born 1894) (1894–1981), English footballer for Tranmere Rovers
- Johnny Campbell (1894–1969), communist activist and newspaper editor
- Johnny Campbell (footballer, born 1910) (1910–1999), Leicester City and Lincoln City forward
- Johnny Campbell (footballer, born 1923) (1923–1968), Irish footballer for Belfast Celtic, Fulham, Northern Ireland
- Johnny Campbell (footballer, born 1928) (1928–2015), English footballer for Gateshead
- Johnny Campbell (rugby league), British rugby player

== See also ==
- John Campbell (disambiguation)
