= Jonathan Campbell =

Jonathan Campbell may refer to:

- Jonathan Campbell (theologian) (born 1964), professor of religion
- Jonathan Campbell (soccer) (born 1993), American soccer player
- Jonathan A. Campbell (born 1947), American herpetologist
- Jonathan D. Campbell, American composer

== See also ==
- Jon Campbell, Scottish singer and producer
- John Campbell (disambiguation)
