= John Campbell (London, Ontario politician) =

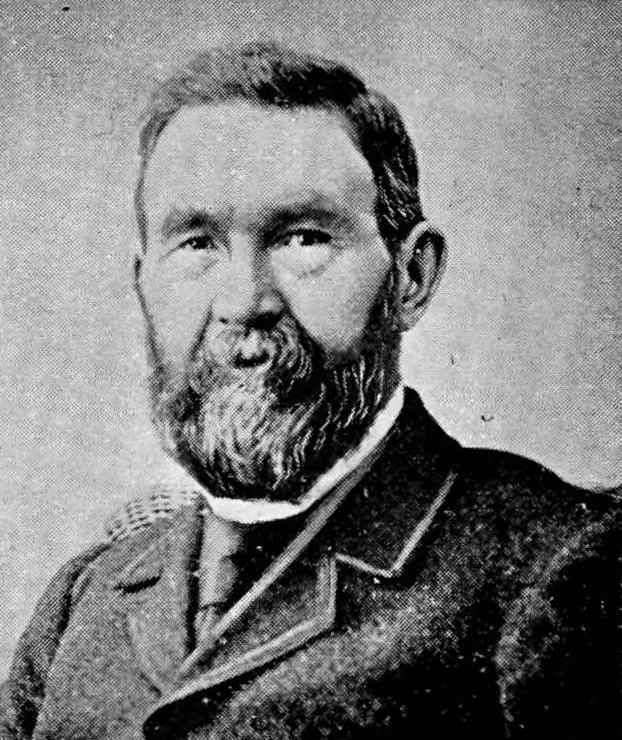
Campbell in an undated photograph

John Campbell (1823 – November 7, 1901) was a Scottish-born carriage maker and politician in Ontario, Canada. He served as mayor of London in 1872 and from 1880 to 1881.

He was born in Dunbartonshire and trained as a blacksmith. He came to Canada in 1848, settling in London. Campbell first worked for carriage maker Marcus Holmes and later opened his own business. He served on London city council from 1867 to 1871 and from 1876 to 1879.

On 15 July 1851, he married Agnes McNeil and they had six children, John (1852–1859), Sarah (1855–1954), Robert (1857–1859), John Alex (1859–1864), Helen (1861–1865), and John Arthur Alex (1864–1950).

After his death, his son John Arthur Alex Campbell continued operating the family business.
