= John T. Campbell =

American politician

John T. Campbell was an American politician. He served in the California legislature and, during the American Civil War, he served in the United States Army.
