= Jacob Meltzer =

Jacob Meltzer (21 October 1898 – 16 December 1976) was a New Zealand lawyer, unionist, coroner and community leader. He was born in Newcastle upon Tyne, Northumberland, England, on 21 October 1898.
