= SS John A. Campbell =

World War II Liberty ship of the United States

History

United States
- Name: John A. Campbell
- Namesake: John Archibald Campbell
- Owner: War Shipping Administration (WSA)
- Operator: Moore-McCormack Lines, Inc.
- Ordered: as type (EC2-S-C1) hull, MC hull 1496
- Builder: J.A. Jones Construction, Brunswick, Georgia
- Cost: $1.866.006; =$33 million in 2025
- Yard number: 112
- Way number: 2
- Laid down: 13 April 1943
- Launched: 14 August 1943
- Sponsored by: Mrs. Frank Dowd
- Completed: 31 August 1943
- Identification: Call Signal: KIRC
- Fate: Laid up in National Defense Reserve Fleet, Astoria, Oregon, 21 October 1947; Sold for scrapping, 6 July 1967

General characteristics
- Class & type: Liberty ship; type EC2-S-C1, standard
- Tonnage: 10,865 LT DWT; 7,176 GRT
- Displacement: 3,380 long tons (3,434 t) (light); 14,245 long tons (14,474 t) (max)
- Length: 441 feet 6 inches (135 m) oa; 416 feet (127 m) pp; 427 feet (130 m) lwl
- Beam: 57 feet (17 m)
- Draft: 27 ft 9.25 in (8.4646 m)
- Installed power: 2 × Oil fired 450 °F (232 °C) boilers, operating at 220 psi (1,500 kPa); 2,500 hp (1,900 kW)
- Propulsion: 1 × triple-expansion steam engine, (manufactured by Filer and Stowell, Milwaukee, Wisconsin); 1 × screw propeller
- Speed: 11.5 knots (21.3 km/h; 13.2 mph)
- Capacity: 562,608 cubic feet (15,931 m^{3}) (grain); 499,573 cubic feet (14,146 m^{3}) (bale)
- Complement: 38–62 USMM; 21–40 USNAG
- Armament: Varied by ship; Bow-mounted 3-inch (76 mm)/50-caliber gun; Stern-mounted 4-inch (102 mm)/50-caliber gun; 2–8 × single 20-millimeter (0.79 in) Oerlikon anti-aircraft (AA) cannons and/or, 2–8 × 37-millimeter (1.46 in) M1 AA guns

SS John A. Campbell was a Liberty ship built in the United States during World War II. She was named after John A. Campbell, an Associate Justice of the Supreme Court of the United States and Peace Commissioner for the Confederate States of America.

== Construction ==
John A. Campbell was laid down on 13 April 1943, under a United States Maritime Commission (MARCOM) contract, MC hull 1496, by J.A. Jones Construction, Brunswick, Georgia; sponsored by Mrs. Frank Dowd, and launched on 14 August 1943.

== History ==
She was allocated to Moore-McCormack Lines, Inc., on 31 August 1943. On 21 October 1947, she was laid up in the National Defense Reserve Fleet in Astoria, Oregon. On 9 June 1954, she was withdrawn from the fleet to be loaded with grain under the "Grain Program 1954"; she returned loaded with grain on 23 June 1954. She was again withdrawn from the fleet on 8 October 1957 to have the grain unloaded; she returned empty on 11 October 1957. On 6 July 1967, she was sold to Universal Salvage and Construction for $51,700, for scrapping; she was delivered on 29 August 1967.

== Bibliography ==
- "Jones Construction, Brunswick GA". ShipbuildingHistory.com. 13 October 2010.
- "Liberty Ships – World War II".
- Maritime Administration. "John A. Campbell". Ship History Database Vessel Status Card. U.S. Department of Transportation, Maritime Administration. Archived from the original on 12 December 2019.
- Davies, James (May 2004). "Specifications (As-Built)" (PDF). p. 23.
- "SS John A. Campbell".
