= Void-Vacon =

- Commune
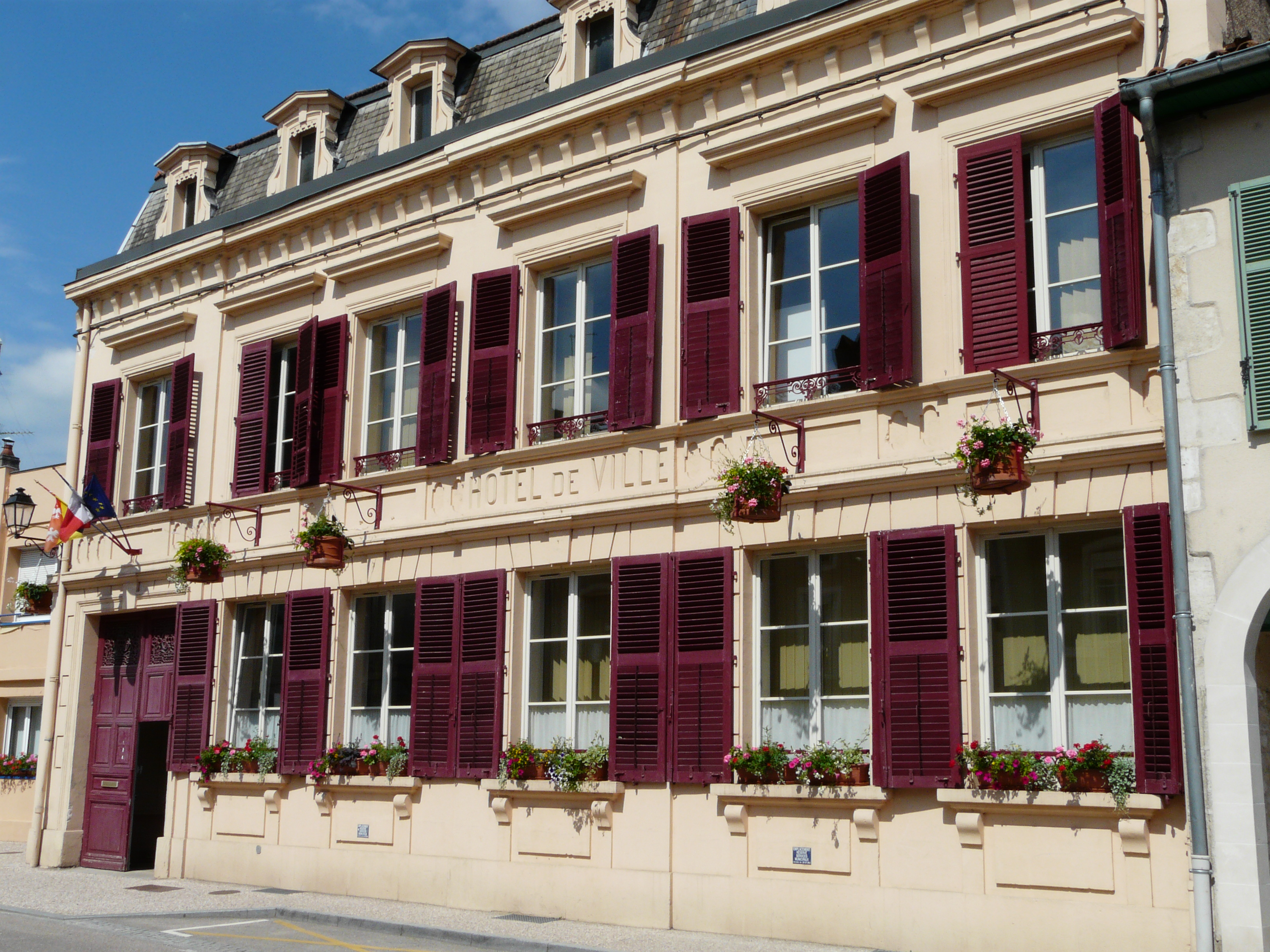
- The town hall in Void-Vacon

- Coat of arms
- Location of Void-Vacon
- Location within France Location within Grand Est
- Coordinates: 48°41′19″N 5°37′08″E
- Country: France
- Region: Grand Est
- Department: Meuse
- Arrondissement: Commercy
- Canton: Vaucouleurs
- Intercommunality: Commercy-Void-Vaucouleurs

Government
  - Mayor (2020–2026): Sylvie Rochon
- Area^{1}: 35.58 km^{2} (13.74 sq mi)
- Elevation: 243 m (797 ft)
- Highest elevation: 374 m (1,227 ft)
- Lowest elevation: 231 m (758 ft)
- Population (2023): 1,599
  - Density: 44.94/km^{2} (116.4/sq mi)
- Time zone: UTC+01:00 (CET)
  - Summer (DST): UTC+02:00 (CEST)
- INSEE/Postal code: 55573 /55190
- ^{1} French Land Register data, which excludes lakes, ponds, glaciers > 1 km^{2} (0.386 sq mi or 247 acres) and river estuaries.

Void-Vacon (French pronunciation: [vwa vakɔ̃]) is a commune in the Meuse department in Grand Est in north-eastern France.

== See also ==
- Communes of the Meuse department
