= John Campbell (farmer) =

Scottish farmer and businessperson (1934–2024)

Sir John Park Campbell, OBE (1 April 1934 – 10 September 2024) was a Scottish farmer and businessman.

== Early life ==
Born on 1 April 1934, Campbell and his brother began farming at the age of 15 as tenants on a hill farm in Argyll; having met with success, they were eventually able to buy the land.

== Glenrath Farms ==
In 1957, Campbell married Catherine Kent, the daughter of poultry farmers. That year, he started rearing poultry (with 113 hens) from his wife's farm. At the age of 27, he and his wife moved to Glenrath Farm near Peebles. It was not an immediate success, and he had to sell part of the farm but his fortunes reversed and in 1970 he acquired another poultry farm. He eventually secured a contract with a Scottish supermarket, which later merged into Tesco. By 2010, Glenrath Farms (of which Campbell was chairman) operated on 12,000 acres of land and produced 1.4 million eggs a day; 75% of these are sold to Tesco and 25% to Asda.

== Public service ==
Alongside his business work, Campbell sat on Tweeddale District Council between 1975 and 1993.

== Death ==
Campbell died at his farm on 10 September 2024, at the age of 90.

== Honours and awards ==
Campbell was appointed an Officer of the Order of the British Empire (OBE) in the 2000 New Year Honours "for services to the Poultry Industry". He was knighted in the 2017 New Year Honours for "services to farming and charitable service to entrepreneurship".
