= John Archibald Campbell =

US Supreme Court justice from 1853 to 1861

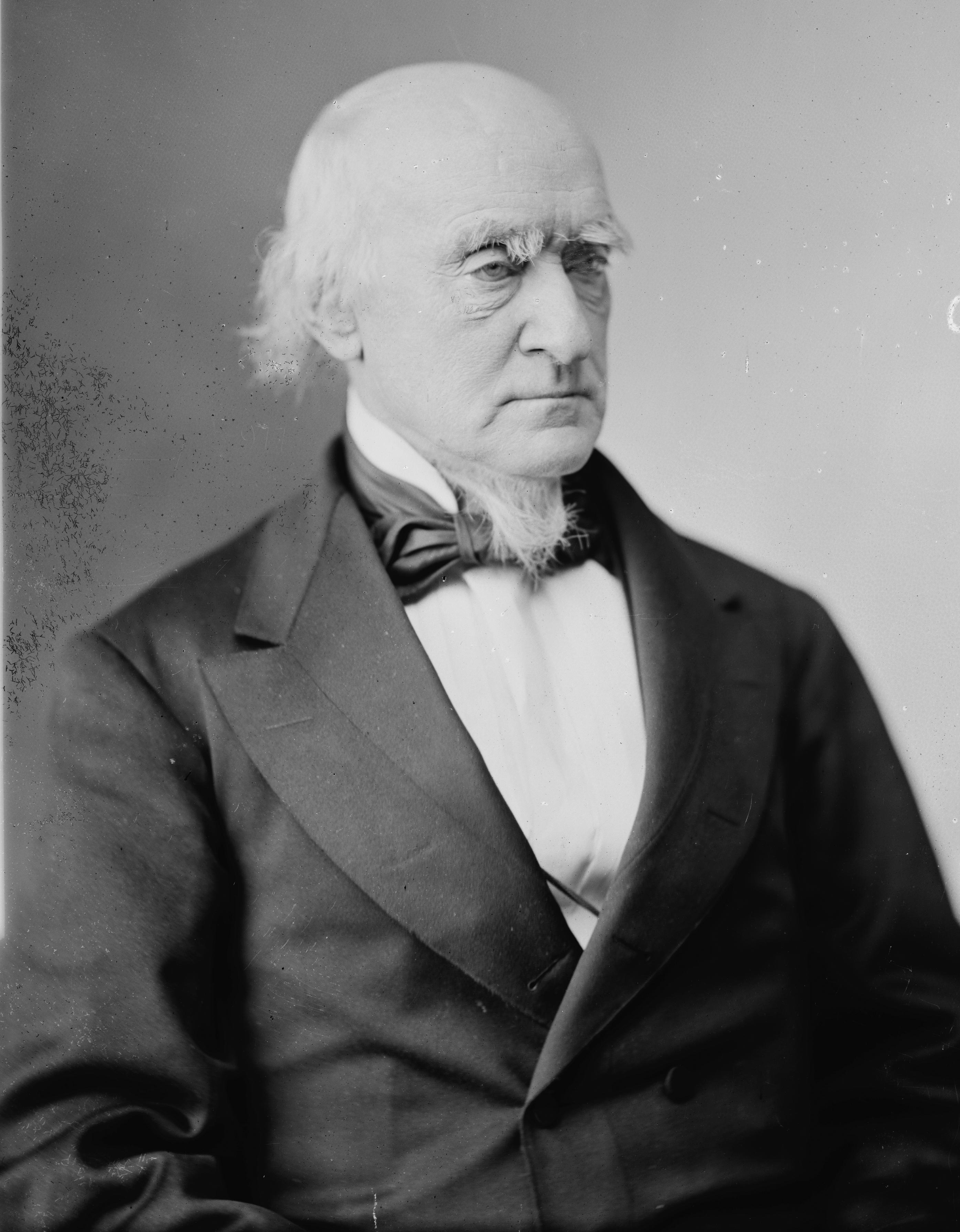
- John Campbell, by Mathew Brady, c. 1870–80

Associate Justice of the Supreme Court of the United States
- In office April 11, 1853 – April 30, 1861
- Nominated by: Franklin Pierce
- Preceded by: John McKinley
- Succeeded by: David Davis

Personal details
- Born: June 24, 1811 Washington, Georgia, U.S.
- Died: March 12, 1889 (aged 77) Baltimore, Maryland, U.S.
- Resting place: Green Mount Cemetery; Baltimore, Maryland, U.S.
- Party: Democratic
- Spouse: Anna Goldthwaite (m. 1830)
- Children: 6
- Education: University of Georgia (BA); United States Military Academy

Military service
- Allegiance: United States
- Branch/service: United States Army
- Years of service: 1825–1828
- Rank: Officer Cadet
- Unit: United States Military Academy

John Archibald Campbell (June 24, 1811 – March 12, 1889) was an American jurist. He was a successful lawyer in Georgia and Alabama, where he served in the state legislature. Appointed by Franklin Pierce to the United States Supreme Court in 1853, he resigned at the beginning of the American Civil War, traveled south and became an official of the Confederate States of America. After serving six months in a military prison at war's end, he secured a pardon and resumed his law practice in New Orleans, where he also opposed Reconstruction.

== Early life and education ==
Campbell was born near Washington, Wilkes County, Georgia to the former Mary Williamson and her husband, Col. Duncan Greene Campbell (for whom the now-defunct Campbell County, Georgia, was named). Col. Campbell had been born in North Carolina and attended college in Chapel Hill before moving to Wilkes County, Georgia and studying law under Judge John Griffin. An attorney, he also served as a trustee for many years of Franklin College, which his son attended, and which later became the University of Georgia. In 1824, while this boy was in college, President James Monroe appointed Duncan Campbell and another man to try to buy the land of the Creek Native Americans. His maternal grandfather was Lt. Col. Micajah Perry Williamson (1744-1796), who was born in Isle of Wight County, Virginia and became a trusted officer serving under General Elijah Clarke during the American Revolutionary War. He received 12,000 acres in Franklin County, Georgia for his Revolutionary War service and became a wealthy landowner in Wilkes County, including helping to lay out the county seat named after General Washington, and establishing the Wilkes Academy in 1797.

Considered a child prodigy, Campbell graduated from the University of Georgia in 1825 at the age of 14, and immediately enrolled at the United States Military Academy, where he studied for three years. He would have graduated in 1830, but withdrew upon hearing of his father's death in July 1828 and returned home to Georgia.

While at the United States Military Academy in West Point, New York, on December 24–25, 1826, Campbell was involved in the Eggnog Riot (also known as the "Grog Mutiny"). Campbell was among 70 cadets that were involved, but a review concluded that only 20 cadets and one enlisted soldier should be charged. Court-martial proceedings ran from December 26, 1826, to March 16, 1827. On May 3, 1827, President John Quincy Adams adjusted some of the verdicts and approved the rest, so nine cadets were expelled. Other involved cadets included Jefferson Davis (involved but not charged), and Robert E. Lee (not involved but testified). Although some called for Campbell and classmate James W. M. "Weems" Berrien to be expelled, this was rejected. Returning to Georgia, Campbell read law with his uncle, former Georgia governor John Clark, and was admitted to the bar in 1829, at the age of 18 which required a special act of the Georgia legislature.

== Personal life ==
In 1830, Campbell relocated to Montgomery, Alabama, and married Anna Esther Goldthwaite, a native of New Hampshire who had settled in Alabama. Together, they raised five children: one son and four daughters.

Campbell’s marriage lasted over five decades until Anna’s death in 1887, two years before Campbell himself died in 1889.

== Alabama lawyer and legislator ==
In 1830, Campbell moved to Montgomery, Alabama, where he met and married Anna Esther Goldthwaite and earned a reputation as a talented lawyer specializing in Spanish land grant titles. Hailed as a war hero for his involvement in the Creek Indian War of 1836, Campbell was elected state representative for that same year's term, firmly establishing himself as a Jacksonian Democrat in the state legislature. Thus Campbell aligned with Jackson on national policies, supporting the bank veto and condemning nullification, but he remained a moderate proponent of states' rights.

After his only term in office, Campbell and his young family (which eventually expanded to include five daughters and one son) relocated to Mobile, Alabama, and Campbell later served a second term as state representative in 1842. Fortunately for Campbell's law career, though, Mobile was a bustling port city that constantly generated commercial lawsuits and Spanish grant disputes. In one such grant case, Mayor of Mobile v. Eslava (1849), Campbell revealed his states-rightist attitude and first articulated his doctrine of "original sovereignty" before the state supreme court. Briefly, Campbell argued that because each of the original 13 states had retained sovereignty over the navigable waters within its borders, and the Constitution makes all new states enter the Union on equal terms with existing states, new states like Alabama thus also retain sovereignty over their navigable waters. The Supreme Court upheld original sovereignty in an 1845 decision and Campbell would later refer to it in his Dred Scott concurrence. Thereafter, Campbell's star continued to rise as one of the most sought-after attorneys in Alabama, and in 1852, he even acted as an attorney for Myra Clark Gaines against Richard Relf before the Supreme Court. In most cases, Campbell represented debtors against banks, demonstrating a Jacksonian Democratic tendency to advocate for state control of corporate development and champion the individual's economic freedom. Twice, he turned down offers to sit on the Alabama Supreme Court, and on several occasions, he argued cases before the US Supreme Court.

During this successful early period as a lawyer, his political involvement also increased. From 1847 to 1851, for example, Campbell joined the national debate on slavery with the publication of four essays in the Southern Quarterly Review in which he called for improved conditions for slaves and gradual emancipation. Here, his theories and practices diverged: Campbell owned up to 14 slaves throughout his life, but he freed several before his Supreme Court appointment. Moreover, Campbell attended the Nashville Convention in 1850, where he helped compose a series of resolutions in reaction to the proposed Compromise of 1850. Although he drafted several of the final 13 resolutions in a conciliatory tone and never called for southern resistance, Campbell advocated the rights of slaveholders, condemned the free soil philosophy, and asserted the sole right of the states to regulate slavery within their borders.

== Supreme Court ==
=== Appointment ===
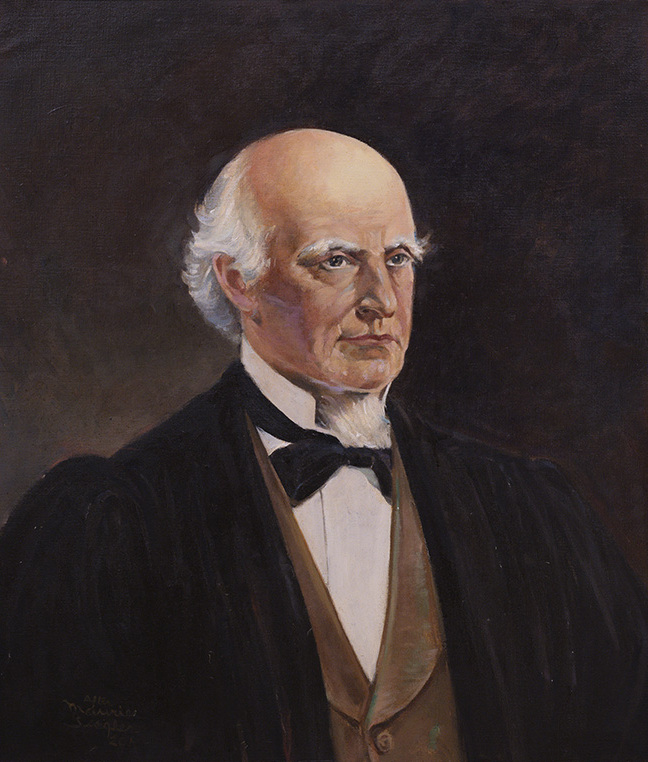
Portrait of John A. Campbell, c. 1870s

In 1852 the death of Justice John McKinley created a vacancy on the Supreme Court. President Millard Fillmore, a Whig, made three nominations to fill the vacancy, all of whom withdrew, declined to serve, or were not acted on by the Democratic-controlled Senate. After the election of Franklin Pierce, a Democrat, a group of sitting Supreme Court justices approached Pierce to recommend Campbell as a nominee; that is one of the few known times that sitting justices have made recommendations for new nominations. Pierce, who was hoping to stave off an insurrection by appeasing the South, agreed to nominate the Alabamian Campbell. The nomination was made on March 21, 1853, and even though Campbell was only 41 and had no previous judicial experience, the Senate unanimously approved the appointment within three days, including Northerners, who hoped that Campbell's moderate tendencies would help overpower the growing sectionalism.

=== Constitutional contributions ===
Under the direction of Chief Justice Roger B. Taney, the Supreme Court weighed in on a number of important economic cases. In the 1837 case of Charles River Bridge v. Warren Bridge, for instance, Taney wrote the majority opinion, arguing for strict construction of corporate charters and effectively restraining the implications of the Marshall Court's 1819 ruling in Dartmouth College v. Woodward, which had recognized corporate charters as contracts under constitutional protection. Thereafter, the slight majority of Jacksonian Democrats on the bench became uneasy supporters of corporate privilege, bound to respect rights that were expressly granted in corporate charters and effectively limiting state control over intrastate internal improvements. Moreover, in 1844, the Taney Court had expanded upon the Marshall Court's 1809 decision in Bank of the United States v. Deveaux and upheld in Louisville v. Letson (1844) that regardless of where its shareholders resided, a corporation could claim citizenship in the state of its incorporation and thereby bring suit to the federal court under diversity jurisdiction. Although the Taney Court quickly reversed the precedent in Marshall v. Baltimore & Ohio Transportation & Railroad Company (1854) and ruled that corporations, in fact, derive their citizenship from their shareholders and not from the states themselves, diversity jurisdiction still applied to corporations.

Campbell refused to accept the Taney Court's recent precedents on these corporate issues. His opinion in Marshall v. Baltimore & Ohio Railroad Company marked his first major dissent, in which he clearly argued, "a corporation is not a citizen. It may be an artificial person, a moral person, a judicial person, a legal entity, a faculty, an intangible, invisible being," but, he continued, quoting John Marshall, "it certainly is not a citizen." Contesting corporate citizenship as the basis for diversity jurisdiction, Campbell further argued that corporations were not "within the contemplation of the framers of the Constitution when they delegated jurisdiction over controversies between the citizens of different states". The Privileges and Immunities Clause (Article IV, Section 2, Clause 1), in other words, should not extend citizenship to corporations. Arguably, Campbell's argument here, as well as in the dissenting opinions of fellow southern Justices John Catron and Peter V. Daniel, implicitly defended slavery. After all, if states could confer federal citizenship on corporations, then free blacks might also claim federal citizenship under the Privileges and Immunities Clause. Later in his dissent, Campbell the Jacksonian Democrat also argued that the Court had encroached upon state powers by overextending federal jurisdiction in this case and that corporations themselves threaten states' internal powers. Explicitly, Campbell wrote, "their [corporate] revenues and establishments mock at the frugal and stinted conditions of state administration; their pretensions and demands are sovereign, admitting impatiently interference by state legislative authority." If left unchecked by state legislatures and even protected by the national government, corporations threatened states' rights. In his first important case, then, Campbell took a hard stance against corporate privilege, defended states' rights, and arguably protected slavery.

In later cases, Campbell continued to fight corporate privilege by challenging Contract Clause protection of corporate charters. The following year, in fact, the Court heard Piqua Branch of the State Bank of Ohio v. Knoop (1854), a case which raised the question of whether a state legislature could change its taxation policy on corporations. Specifically, the Ohio General Banking Act of 1845 had provided that instead of paying taxes, each incorporated branch of the state bank would semiannually send six percent of its profits to the state. A subsequent 1851 law established a new taxing policy on banks. Ultimately, the Court ruled that the 1851 law had violated the Contract Clause because the 1845 law had constituted a contract between the state and a corporation of private shareholders. Campbell, again part of the southern faction with Justices Catron and Daniel, emphatically dissented. Early in this dissent, Campbell distinguished "between the statutes which create hopes, expectations, faculties, conditions, and those which form contracts", ultimately arguing that the 1845 statute constituted the latter. Later, Campbell defended state power to legislate in the public's best interest, explaining that this power is one "which every department of government knows that the community is interested in retaining unimpaired and that every corporator understood its abandonment ought not to be presumed in a case in which the deliberate purpose to abandon it does not appear". State governments, according to Campbell, should be able to change their policies in order to keep pace with ever-evolving conditions; furthermore, banks and other corporations were not exempted from tax adjustments unless explicitly stated in the statute. Campbell clearly prioritized states' rights over corporate privilege.

The Court revisited this Ohio statute in two subsequent cases in the 1850s, and both times, Campbell issued thorough dissents. Leading up to the final case, Dodge v. Woolsey (1855), the Ohio state legislature had amended its constitution to end tax exemptions for banks before enacting a new bank tax law in 1852. When a shareholder of the bank brought suit once again, the Court's majority, led by Justice James M. Wayne, maintained that even though the people of Ohio had amended their constitution, the 1845 bank act still constituted an inviolable contract. In his elaborate dissent, Campbell recounted the facts of the case, denied corporate citizenship yet again, and criticized the majority for expanding judicial power. Campbell warned that if a state should grant away its funds and powers to a corporation, then "the most deliberate and solemn acts of the people would not serve to redress the injustice, and the overreaching speculator upon the facility or corruption of their legislature would be protected by the powers of this Court in the profits of his bargain." In other words, this decision bound the Supreme Court to protect corrupt corporations and legislatures against the warranted state constitutional amendments proposed by the people themselves. Furthermore, this collusion between the central government and corporate entities, Campbell cautioned, will "establish on the soil of every state a caste made up of combinations of men for the most part under the most favorable conditions in society", eventually spawning "a new element of alienation and discord between the different classes of society and the introduction of a fresh cause of disturbance in our distracted political and social system". Not only did corporations generate class conflict and threaten state sovereignty, argued the Jacksonian Democrat, but they also infringed upon individual liberties. After all, corporations "display a love of power, a preference for corporate interests to moral or political principles or public duties, and an antagonism to individual freedom which have marked them as objects of jealousy in every epoch of their history". In short, Campbell did not consider a broad interpretation of the Contract Clause a sufficient justification for all of the potential evils of corporate entities. Instead, Campbell firmly believed that states should have direct control over corporate expansion.

Five years later, Campbell successfully persuaded the majority of the Court to agree with a narrower interpretation of the Contract Clause in the 1860 case of Christ's Church Hospital v. County of Philadelphia. In 1833, the Pennsylvania legislature had granted a tax exemption to Christ's Church Hospital, but in 1851, it enacted a tax upon all associations and corporations. Campbell concisely rejected the hospital's claim that the 1833 tax exemption was perpetual, writing, "such an interpretation is not to be favored, as the power of taxation is necessary to the existence of the State, and must be exerted according to the varying conditions of the Commonwealth." As he had been arguing since taking the bench, states need to be able to adapt to the times and therefore have the right to control corporate development within their borders.

As sectional tensions escalated in the late 1850s, the Court came to hear divisive slavery cases, including the notorious Dred Scott v. Sandford (1857). Attempting to settle the issue of slavery in the territories once and for all, Chief Justice Taney's majority opinion forcefully asserted that blacks were not citizens and condemned the Missouri Compromise by declaring unconstitutional the federal regulation of slavery in the territories. Campbell issued a comprehensive concurring opinion. Although Campbell believed that the Court could not determine Scott's citizenship status and refused to discuss this issue, he aligned with Taney in most other claims and offered a narrow interpretation of the Constitution. Namely, Campbell agreed that Scott remained a slave under Missouri law and therefore could not sue in federal court. He then dedicated the greater part of his opinion to disproving the constitutionality of the Missouri Compromise, ultimately concluding that the Constitution's Territories Clause (Article IV, Section 3) did not grant Congress the power to regulate slavery in the territories. To arrive at this conclusion, Campbell first asserted that Congress could not regulate slavery within existing states. After all, he wrote, "it is a settled doctrine of this court that the Federal government can exercise no power over the subject of slavery within the States, nor control the intermigration of slaves, other than fugitives, among the States." And although the Territories Clause may grant Congress the authority to organize a government over public domain, it did not confer Congressional power to regulate municipal institutions, such as slavery, in the territories. Relying on his doctrine of original sovereignty, Campbell argued that such a clause permitting restrictive federal legislation would violate the innate sovereignty of the people in the territories, for when the people established their own state governments, these new states entered into the Union on equal footing with older states. Furthermore, if the framers had really envisioned Congressional regulation of slavery in the territories, then southern delegates at the Constitutional Convention would have vehemently protested. In his own words, "the claim for Congress of supreme power in the Territories, under the grant to 'dispose of and make all needful rules and regulations respecting territory,' is not supported by the historical evidence drawn from the Revolution, the Confederation, or the deliberations which preceded the ratification of the Federal Constitution." As follows, the Territories Clause "confers no power upon Congress to dissolve the relations of the master and slave on the domain of the United States, either within or without any of the States". In Dred Scott, Campbell clearly challenged what he considered to be an overextension of federal authority and advocated for territorial—and, by implication, state—self-government.

Despite his proslavery and states' rightist concurrence in Dred Scott, Campbell upset many of his fellow southerners while presiding over the Fifth Circuit. In 1854 and 1858, he had frustrated two separate filibustering efforts to acquire Cuba and then Nicaragua, thus prioritizing national neutrality policies over southern efforts to gain more slaveholding states.

== American Civil War ==
In March and April 1861, prior to the outbreak of the American Civil War, Justice Campbell served as a mediator between three commissioners representing the Confederacy (Martin Crawford, Andre B. Roman, and John Forsyth Jr.), and the Lincoln administration. The commissioners indicated they were interested in preventing war if possible. Since President Lincoln denied that secession was valid, he refused any official contact with the Confederate commissioners, but Justice Campbell was permitted in their place.

On March 15, 1861, following the impassioned Senate speech of Stephen A. Douglas calling for the withdrawal of US forces from Confederate territory in order to ease tensions and prevent war, Lincoln's Secretary of State William H. Seward met with and assured Justice Campbell that Fort Sumter would be evacuated within ten days. Again on March 20, 1861, Campbell was assured by Seward of the Lincoln Administration's intent to withdraw from the key military outpost. Due to a distrust of Seward, Campbell brought fellow Supreme Court Justice Samuel Nelson to this second meeting to act as a witness to Seward's promise.

As feared by Campbell, on April 8 Lincoln reversed course by publicly stating he intended to resupply Fort Sumter either "peacefully, or otherwise by force". This resupply mission resulted in the Confederate bombardment of Fort Sumter, Lincoln's proclamation of a state of rebellion and the start of the war.

As a result, Campbell resigned from the Supreme Court on April 30, 1861, and returned south. He was the only southern justice to do so. Threatened with lynching and effectively banished from Alabama for his moderate views, opposition to secession, and attempt at mediation, Campbell settled in New Orleans. A year and a half later, in October 1862, he was appointed Confederate Assistant Secretary of War by Confederate president Jefferson Davis. He held that position through the end of the war.

Since Campbell served the Confederacy after his role as mediator, Lincoln's private secretary and subsequent biographer John G. Nicolay, ascribed ill motives to Campbell in that he "came to Seward in the guise of a loyal official, though his correspondence with Jefferson Davis soon revealed a treasonable intent". However, even when serving the Confederacy, Campbell still advocated for peace.

Justice Campbell was one of the three Confederate Peace Commissioners (along with Alexander H. Stephens and Robert M. T. Hunter), who met with Abraham Lincoln and William H. Seward in 1865 at the Hampton Roads Conference in an unsuccessful attempt to negotiate an end to the Civil War.

== Postbellum ==
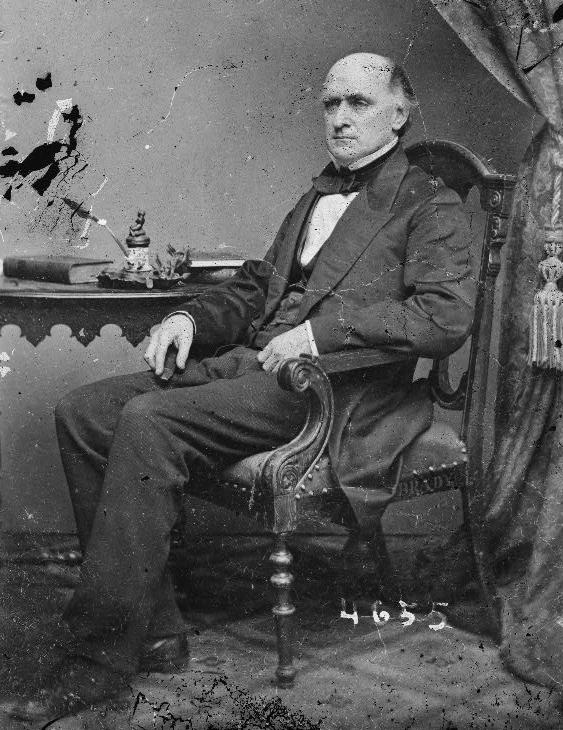
Judge John A. Campbell

=== Federal detention ===
On April 14, 1865, five days after the war ended, Lincoln was assassinated. Having previously met with Lincoln as a member of the Confederacy, Campbell was loosely suspected in the assassination. He was arrested on May 30, 1865, and was held in federal detention at Fort Pulaski, Georgia, for the next five months. Campbell was never formally charged. Former colleagues and Supreme Court Justices Benjamin R. Curtis and Samuel Nelson intervened on Campbell's behalf, and he was released in October 1865.

=== Legal career ===
At the end of the war, Campbell was not able to immediately practice law. Due to laws passed by Congress, attorneys who had aided the Confederacy were prohibited from practicing law in Federal Court. In Ex parte Garland this law was held to be unconstitutional and Campbell was able to get back to work. He was again recognized as one of the nation's most competent attorneys and became so busy that he argued only cases brought before the U.S. Supreme Court. Campbell argued (but lost) the noted Slaughterhouse Case, representing a group of butchers who suffered business losses due to a Louisiana law which limited slaughterhouses to a single location in New Orleans. He argued that the Fourteenth Amendment's Privileges or Immunities Clause guaranteed the butchers' right to practice an otherwise lawful trade. However, Campbell lost the case. The Supreme Court held that the Privileges and Immunities Clause of the 14th Amendment protected nothing more than a limited set of pre-existing federal rights, and did not include the right to pursue a trade. The result stood for decades. Some believe that had the court adopted Campbell's argument, federal civil rights would have been extended to the states decades earlier.

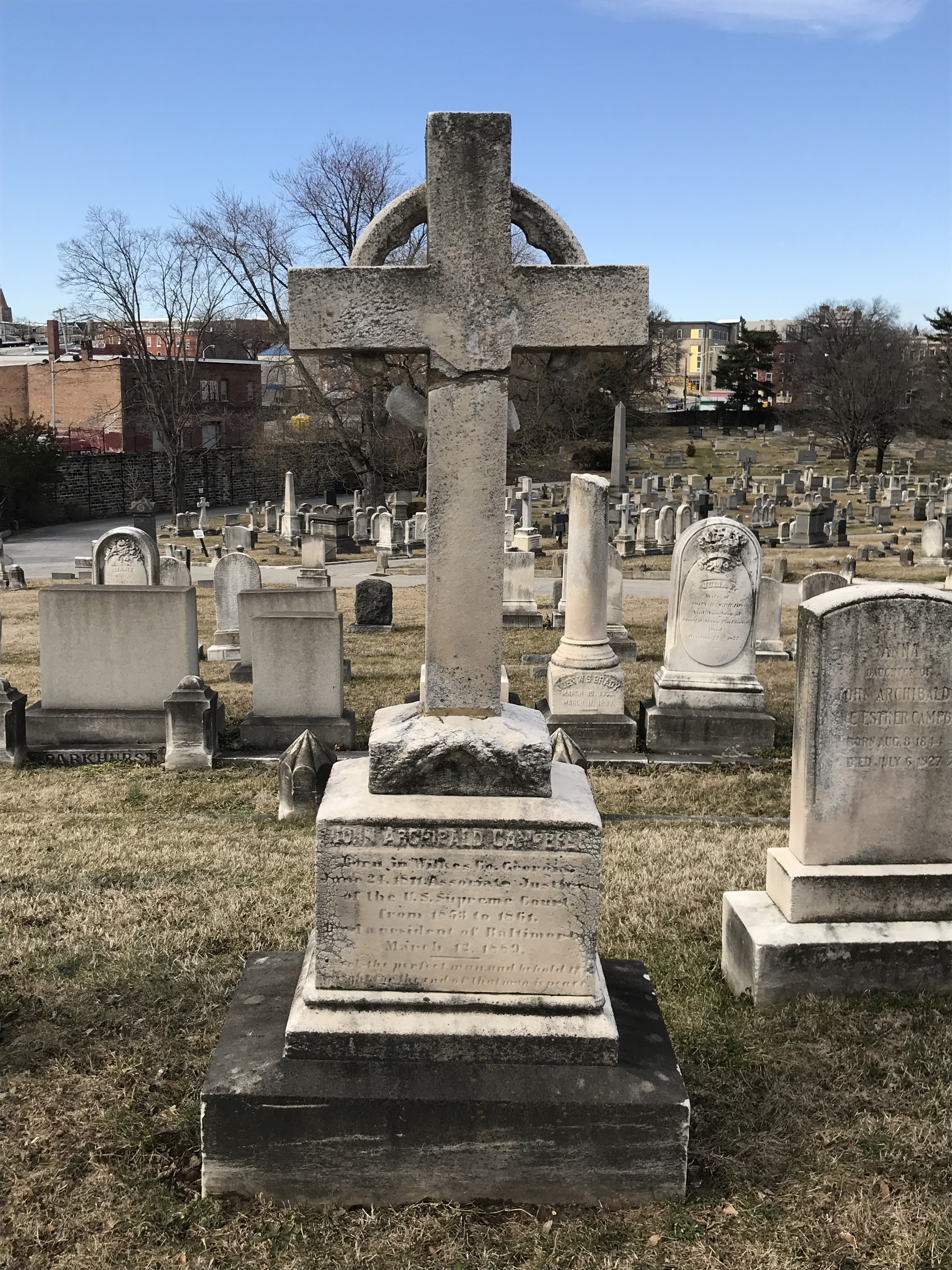
Campbell's gravesite

Campbell was a member of the "Committee of One Hundred" that went to Washington to persuade President Grant to end his support of what they called the "Kellogg usurpation". Grant had sent troops to support Governor William Pitt Kellogg of Louisiana. Grant initially refused to meet them but later relented; he did not, however, change his position on the matter.

=== Death ===
Campbell died on March 12, 1889, in Baltimore, Maryland. He is interred at Green Mount Cemetery in Baltimore.

== Legacy and honors ==
During World War II the Liberty ship SS John A. Campbell was built in Brunswick, Georgia, and named in his honor. The John Archibald Campbell United States Courthouse was built in Mobile, Alabama in 1934. He is also the namesake for the Federal Building next door, built during the Richard Nixon Administration.

== See also ==
- List of justices of the Supreme Court of the United States

== Notes ==
Legal offices
| Preceded by John McKinley | Associate Justice of the Supreme Court of the United States; 1853–1861 | Succeeded by David Davis |
