= Marion Mingins =

The Reverend Canon Marion Mingins QHC
- Canon residentiary of St Edmundsbury Cathedral
- Church: Church of England
- Diocese: Diocese of St Edmundsbury and Ipswich
- In office: 1993 to 2002
- Other post: Chaplain to the Queen (1996–2006)

Orders
- Ordination: 9 July 1987 (deacon) by Ronald Bowlby; 30 April 1994 (priest) by John Dennis

Personal details
- Born: Marion Elizabeth Mingins; 12 July 1952 Newcastle-upon-Tyne, England
- Died: 26 May 2006 (aged 53)
- Denomination: Anglican

Marion Elizabeth Mingins, QHC (12 July 1952 – 26 June 2006) was a British Anglican priest and former social worker. A canon residentiary of St Edmundsbury Cathedral from 1993 to 2002, she became the first Anglican woman to become a Chaplain to the Queen when she was appointed in 1996.

== Early life and education ==
Mingins was born on 12 July 1952 in Newcastle-upon-Tyne, England. She studied social science and administration at the University of Birmingham, and graduated with a Bachelor of Social Science (BSocSci) in 1973. She then undertook training in social work at the University of Leicester, and she completed the Certificate of Qualification in Social Work (CQSW) in 1975.

== Ministry ==
Mingins felt a call to ordination, but the ordination of women in the Church of England was years away. She instead joined the Church Army, an Anglican evangelistic organisation which accepted men and women, and attended the Church Army Training College. During her training, she completed the Cambridge Diploma in Religious Studies. She was commissioned into the Church Army in 1979, and appointed a warden of an old people's home. After four years as a warden, and having come to national attention, she was appointed a selection secretary for the Advisory Council for the Church's Ministry (ACCM) of the Church of England in 1983. She was promoted to senior selection secretary in 1984.

=== Ordained ministry ===
On 9 July 1987, with the change of the Church of England's canon law to allow the ordination of women, Mingins became one of the church's first female deacons when she was ordained by Ronald Bowlby, Bishop of Southwark, during a service at Southwark Cathedral. She continued working for the ACCM but also served as a non-stipendiary minister at All Saints Church, Battersea Park in the Diocese of Southwark from 1987 to 1988. She was then drawn to a religious life and was a Novice of the Order of the Holy Paraclete at Whitby, Yorkshire from 1989 to 1991.

In 1991, Mingins left the religious community and returned to secular life. She was appointed a minor canon of St Edmundsbury Cathedral and a became an assistant diocese director of ordinands for the Diocese of St Edmundsbury and Ipswich. This latter appointment was highly unusual, as women had yet to be ordained as priests and she was working with both men and women who were exploring ordination. She was promoted to Diocesan Director of Ordinands (DDO) in 1992, and appointed a Canon Residentiary in 1993, thereby becoming one of the first women to become a full-member of a cathedral chapter.

Mingins was ordained as a priest on 30 April 1994 by John Dennis, Bishop of St Edmundsbury and Ipswich. This was the first year that women could be ordained to the priesthood. In March 1996, it was announced that she had been appointed a Chaplain to the Queen (QHC): she was the first woman appointed from the Church of England and this was seen as royal approval for the ordination of women. As a QHC, she was one of a team of 35 chaplains who took private services for the Royal Family. From 1999 to 2002, having left her previous role as DDO, she served as Canon Pastor of St Edmundsbury Cathedral.

Mingins retired from full-time ministry in 2002, having been diagnosed with breast cancer. She was appointed Canon Emeritus by the cathedral and granted permission to officiate in the Diocese of St Edmundsbury and Ipswich so that she could continue her ministry on a part-time basis. She died on 26 June 2006, aged 53.
