= Jock Campbell =

Jock Campbell may refer to:

- Jock Campbell (British Army officer) (1894–1942), British Army officer and recipient of the Victoria Cross
- Jock Campbell, Baron Campbell of Eskan (1912–1994), British businessman, chair of Milton Keynes Development Corporation
- Jock Campbell (footballer) (1922–1983), Scottish footballer (Charlton Athletic FC)
- Jock Campbell (rugby union) (born 1995), Australian rugby union player
