= John M. Campbell (judge) =

American judge

Senior Judge of the Superior Court of the District of Columbia
- Incumbent
- Assumed office 2024

Associate Judge of the Superior Court of the District of Columbia
- In office November 11, 1997 – May 19, 2023
- President: Bill Clinton
- Preceded by: John H. Suda
- Succeeded by: Katherine E. Oler

Personal details
- Born: August 5, 1953 (age 71); Wooster, Ohio, U.S.
- Education: Yale University (BA, JD)

John M. Campbell (born August 5, 1953) is a senior judge of the Superior Court of the District of Columbia.

== Education and career ==
Gardner earned his Bachelor of Arts from Yale University and his Juris Doctor from Yale Law School, in 1981.

After graduating, he served as a law clerk for Jon O. Newman on the United States Court of Appeals for the Second Circuit. He was the head of the public corruption unit in the office of United States Attorney for the District of Columbia Eric Holder and oversaw prosecutions related to the Congressional Post Office scandal.

=== D.C. Superior Court ===
President Bill Clinton nominated Campbell on September 2, 1997, to a fifteen-year term as an associate judge on the Superior Court of the District of Columbia to the seat vacated by John H. Suda. On October 30, 1997, the Senate Committee on Governmental Affairs held a hearing on his nomination. On November 5, 1997, the Committee reported his nomination favorably to the senate floor. On November 7, 1997, the full United States Senate confirmed his nomination by voice vote.

On September 11, 2012, the Commission on Judicial Disabilities and Tenure recommended that President Obama reappoint him to second fifteen-year term as a judge on the D.C. Superior Court. Campbell retired from the court on May 19, 2023. Starting in August 2023, he was evaluated for an appointment as a senior judge and assumed office the following year.
