= Marcus Holmes =

Marcus Holmes (1805 – October 23, 1872) was a manufacturer and politician in Ontario, Canada. He served as mayor of London in 1854.

Holmes was a wagon and carriage maker in London. His carriage business was located on King Street between Ridout and Talbot Streets. In 1841, he became the first president of the local Mechanics' Institute. He died in London at the age of 67.
