= John Hodgson Campbell =

English painter

- Born: John Hodgson Campbell; 1855; Newcastle, England
- Died: 1927 (aged 71–72); Newcastle, England
- Known for: Painting

John Hodgson Campbell (1855–1927) was a British portrait, landscape and genre painter in oil and watercolour.

== Biography ==
Campbell was born in Newcastle son of John Thompson Campbell. He trained under Cosens Way at Newcastle school of Art. He exhibited at the Royal Academy and the RSA. His work is represented at the British Museum, Laing Art Gallery, Shipley Art Gallery and South Shields Museum.

== List of works ==
- Edward Fletcher (1807–1889), Locomotive Engineer, North Eastern Railway (1882)
- Workman Eating Lunch (1886–1887)
- Under the coaly Tyne (1887)
- Alderman Thomas McDermott, Mayor (1899)
- Francis Joseph Finn (1899)
- Blackberry Gatherers
- Alderman Thomas Hall (1902)
- John Hall (1824–1899) (1905)
- Robert Affleck, JP, Chairman of the Board of Guardians (1905 or before)
- Professor Mark R. Wright, MA (1911)
- The Right Honourable Arthur Munro Sutherland (1867–1953), JP, Lord Mayor of Newcastle upon Tyne (1918–1919)
