= 1935–36 Mansfield Town F.C. season =

Mansfield Town
1935–36 season
- Manager: Charlie Bell, Harold Wightman
- Stadium: Field Mill
- Third Division North: 19th
- FA Cup: First Round
- Third Division North Cup: First Round
Home colours

The 1935–36 season was Mansfield Town's fifth season in the Football League and fourth in the Third Division North, they finished in 19th position with 37 points.

== Final league table ==
| Pos | Team | Pld | W | D | L | GF | GA | GAv | Pts | Promotion or relegation |
|---|---|---|---|---|---|---|---|---|---|---|
| 17 | Halifax Town | 42 | 15 | 7 | 20 | 57 | 61 | 0.934 | 37 | |
| 18 | Wrexham | 42 | 15 | 7 | 20 | 66 | 75 | 0.880 | 37 | |
| 19 | Mansfield Town | 42 | 14 | 9 | 19 | 80 | 91 | 0.879 | 37 | |
| 20 | Rochdale | 42 | 10 | 13 | 19 | 58 | 88 | 0.659 | 33 | |
| 21 | Southport | 42 | 11 | 9 | 22 | 48 | 90 | 0.533 | 31 | Re-elected |

Source: rsssf.com

== Results ==
=== Football League Third Division North ===
| Match | Date | Opponent | Venue | Result | Attendance | Scorers |
|---|---|---|---|---|---|---|
| 1 | 31 August 1935 | Oldham Athletic | H | 1–0 | 11,102 | Allen |
| 2 | 4 September 1935 | Wrexham | A | 1–5 | 7,953 | Whittam |
| 3 | 7 September 1935 | Halifax Town | A | 0–1 | 11,090 | |
| 4 | 11 September 1935 | Wrexham | H | 3–2 | 6,342 | Whittam, Hunter (2) |
| 5 | 14 September 1935 | Darlington | H | 4–2 | 6,130 | Johnson, Allen (3) |
| 6 | 16 September 1935 | Rotherham United | A | 1–2 | 6,299 | Hunter |
| 7 | 21 September 1935 | Gateshead | A | 1–3 | 3,220 | Johnson |
| 8 | 28 September 1935 | Tranmere Rovers | A | 2–3 | 6,674 | Johnson, Allen |
| 9 | 5 October 1935 | Walsall | A | 0–7 | 7,636 | |
| 10 | 12 October 1935 | Carlisle United | H | 1–1 | 4,228 | Atkinson |
| 11 | 19 October 1935 | Southport | H | 3–3 | 1,534 | Harston (3) |
| 12 | 26 October 1935 | Chester | H | 0–0 | 5,561 | |
| 13 | 2 November 1935 | Lincoln City | A | 2–1 | 6,623 | Harston, Hunter |
| 14 | 9 November 1935 | Rochdale | H | 3–0 | 4,762 | Harston, Lockie, Clenshaw |
| 15 | 16 November 1935 | York City | A | 5–7 | 3,643 | Clenshaw (2), Johnson (2), Bytheway |
| 16 | 23 November 1935 | Barrow | H | 1–3 | 4,043 | Whittam |
| 17 | 7 December 1935 | Chesterfield | H | 0–1 | 6,230 | |
| 18 | 14 December 1935 | Stockport County | A | 1–6 | 5,628 | Clenshaw |
| 19 | 21 December 1935 | Crewe Alexandra | H | 1–1 | 2,654 | Harston |
| 20 | 25 December 1935 | Hartlepools United | A | 1–4 | 5,679 | Harston |
| 21 | 26 December 1935 | Hartlepools United | H | 4–0 | 2,959 | Harston, Atkinson (2), Johnson |
| 22 | 28 December 1935 | Oldham Athletic | A | 1–4 | 5,473 | Atkinson |
| 23 | 4 January 1936 | Halifax Town | H | 3–2 | 3,756 | Atkinson (2), Johnson |
| 24 | 11 January 1936 | New Brighton | A | 0–1 | 2,208 | |
| 25 | 18 January 1936 | Darlington | A | 1–2 | 2,927 | Clenshaw |
| 26 | 1 February 1936 | Tranmere Rovers | A | 2–4 | 8,717 | Harston, Anderson |
| 27 | 8 February 1936 | Walsall | H | 2–2 | 4,681 | Harston, Whittam |
| 28 | 15 February 1936 | Carlisle United | A | 0–3 | 4,918 | |
| 29 | 22 February 1936 | Southport | H | 5–1 | 3,662 | Anderson, Clenshaw, Harston (3) |
| 30 | 29 February 1936 | Rochdale | A | 1–3 | 2,227 | Harston |
| 31 | 7 March 1936 | Lincoln City | H | 2–2 | 5,007 | Anderson, Harston |
| 32 | 14 March 1936 | Chester | A | 0–4 | 5,553 | |
| 33 | 21 March 1936 | York City | H | 5–0 | 4,367 | Anderson (2), Atkinson (2), Wass (o.g.) |
| 34 | 28 March 1936 | Barrow | A | 2–2 | 2,829 | Harston (2) |
| 35 | 4 April 1936 | New Brighton | H | 2–0 | 3,220 | Harston (2) |
| 36 | 10 April 1936 | Accrington Stanley | H | 3–1 | 6,165 | Harston, Anderson (2) |
| 37 | 11 April 1936 | Chesterfield | A | 1–2 | 10,523 | Parker |
| 38 | 13 April 1936 | Accrington Stanley | A | 1–1 | 10,523 | Atkinson |
| 39 | 14 April 1936 | Gateshead | H | 3–1 | 3,599 | Harston (3) |
| 40 | 18 April 1936 | Stockport County | H | 2–1 | 4,508 | Harston, Wood |
| 41 | 25 April 1936 | Crewe Alexandra | A | 1–1 | 1,827 | Bytheway |
| 42 | 2 May 1936 | Rotherham United | H | 8–2 | 3,264 | Anderson, Parker (2), Atkinson, Harston (2), Bytheway (2) |

=== FA Cup ===
| Round | Date | Opponent | Venue | Result | Attendance | Scorers |
|---|---|---|---|---|---|---|
| R1 | 30 November 1935 | Hartlepools United | H | 2–3 | 4,651 | Harston, Atkinson |

=== Football League Third Division North Cup ===
| Round | Date | Opponent | Venue | Result | Attendance | Scorers |
|---|---|---|---|---|---|---|
| R1 | 21 October 1935 | Chesterfield | A | 2–2 | 1,000 | Hunter, Whittam |
| R1 Replay | 13 November 1935 | Chesterfield | H | 0–4 | 1,000 | |

== Squad statistics ==
- Squad list sourced from 1935–36 Mansfield Town F.C. season at the English National Football Archive (subscription required)

| Pos. | Name | League | | FA Cup | | Third Division Cup | | Total | |
| Pos. | Name | Apps | Goals | Apps | Goals | Apps | Goals | Apps | Goals |
|---|---|---|---|---|---|---|---|---|---|
| GK | (England) Daniel Black | 10 | 0 | 0 | 0 | 0 | 0 | 10 | 0 |
| GK | (England) Des Fawcett | 32 | 0 | 1 | 0 | 2 | 0 | 35 | 0 |
| DF | (England) Jack Ashley | 1 | 0 | 0 | 0 | 0 | 0 | 1 | 0 |
| DF | (England) George Barlow | 7 | 0 | 0 | 0 | 0 | 0 | 7 | 0 |
| DF | (England) Charlie Bisby | 9 | 0 | 0 | 0 | 0 | 0 | 9 | 0 |
| DF | (England) Thomas Cooke | 6 | 0 | 0 | 0 | 0 | 0 | 6 | 0 |
| DF | (England) Gerald Darvill | 13 | 0 | 1 | 0 | 2 | 0 | 16 | 0 |
| DF | (England) Ted Dransfield | 42 | 0 | 1 | 0 | 2 | 0 | 45 | 0 |
| DF | (Scotland) Tom Lockie | 14 | 1 | 1 | 0 | 2 | 0 | 17 | 1 |
| DF | (England) Jack Moran | 11 | 0 | 0 | 0 | 0 | 0 | 11 | 0 |
| DF | (England) Tommy Pritchard | 1 | 0 | 0 | 0 | 0 | 0 | 1 | 0 |
| DF | (England) Ernest Wright | 32 | 0 | 0 | 0 | 0 | 0 | 32 | 0 |
| MF | (England) Alf Brown | 14 | 0 | 0 | 0 | 0 | 0 | 14 | 0 |
| MF | (England) Mike Gilmore | 20 | 0 | 1 | 0 | 2 | 0 | 23 | 0 |
| MF | (England) William Grundy | 5 | 0 | 0 | 0 | 0 | 0 | 5 | 0 |
| MF | (England) Clarence Hufton | 1 | 0 | 0 | 0 | 0 | 0 | 1 | 0 |
| MF | (England) Bill Slack | 22 | 0 | 1 | 0 | 2 | 0 | 25 | 0 |
| MF | (England) Leonard Wood | 16 | 1 | 0 | 0 | 0 | 0 | 16 | 1 |
| FW | (England) Joe Allen | 8 | 5 | 0 | 0 | 0 | 0 | 8 | 5 |
| FW | (Scotland) George Anderson | 17 | 8 | 0 | 0 | 0 | 0 | 17 | 8 |
| FW | (England) Arthur Atkinson | 40 | 10 | 1 | 1 | 2 | 0 | 43 | 11 |
| FW | (England) Philip Bartley | 2 | 0 | 0 | 0 | 0 | 0 | 2 | 0 |
| FW | (England) George Bytheway | 32 | 4 | 1 | 0 | 1 | 0 | 34 | 4 |
| FW | (England) Les Clenshaw | 27 | 6 | 1 | 0 | 2 | 0 | 30 | 6 |
| FW | (England) Fred Field | 2 | 0 | 0 | 0 | 0 | 0 | 2 | 0 |
| FW | (England) Harry Gabbitas | 1 | 0 | 0 | 0 | 0 | 0 | 1 | 0 |
| FW | (England) Ted Harston | 29 | 26 | 1 | 1 | 1 | 0 | 31 | 27 |
| FW | (Scotland) Jimmy Hunter | 10 | 4 | 0 | 0 | 1 | 1 | 11 | 5 |
| FW | (England) Harry Johnson | 14 | 7 | 0 | 0 | 1 | 0 | 15 | 7 |
| FW | (England) Ernie Parker | 4 | 3 | 0 | 0 | 0 | 0 | 4 | 3 |
| FW | (England) Ernie Whittam | 20 | 4 | 1 | 0 | 2 | 1 | 23 | 5 |
| – | Own goals | – | 1 | – | 0 | – | 0 | – | 1 |
