= 1936–37 Mansfield Town F.C. season =

Mansfield Town
1936–37 season
- Manager: Harry Parkes
- Stadium: Field Mill
- Third Division North: 9th
- FA Cup: Second Round
- Third Division North Cup: First Round
Home colours

The 1936–37 season was Mansfield Town's sixth season in the Football League and fifth in the Third Division North, they finished in 9th position with 44 points and were transferred to the Football League Third Division South. Notable this season was the goal scoring exploits of Ted Harston who scored 58 goals in 44 games including seven against Hartlepools United.

== Final league table ==
Pos	Team	Pld	W	D	L	GF	GA	GAv	Pts	Promotion or relegation
7	Halifax Town	42	18	9	15	68	63	1.079	45	
8	Wrexham	42	16	12	14	71	57	1.246	44	
9	Mansfield Town	42	18	8	16	91	76	1.197	44	Transferred to the Third Division South
10	Carlisle United	42	18	8	16	65	68	0.956	44	
11	Port Vale	42	17	10	15	58	64	0.906	44	

Source: rsssf.com
Rules for classification: 1) Points; 2) Goal average; 3) Goals scored

== Results ==
=== Football League Third Division North ===
Match	Date	Opponent	Venue	Result	Attendance	Scorers
1	29 August 1936	Barrow	H	2–1	7,657	Atkinson, Harston
2	31 August 1936	Rochdale	A	3–1	5,297	Harston (3)
3	5 September 1936	York City	A	1–1	7,504	Atkinson
4	9 September 1936	Rochdale	H	6–2	7,404	Atkinson, Harston (5)
5	12 September 1936	Carlisle United	H	1–4	6,665	Atkinson
6	19 September 1936	Hartlepools United	A	0–3	7,178	
7	26 September 1936	Southport	H	3–0	6,556	Harston, Atkinson, Speed
8	3 October 1936	Tranmere Rovers	A	2–0	6,791	Harston (2)
9	10 October 1936	Halifax Town	H	3–0	7,731	Harston (3)
10	17 October 1936	Hull City	H	5–2	9,779	Harston (4), Atkinson
11	24 October 1936	New Brighton	A	0–0	4,772	
12	31 October 1936	Lincoln City	H	2–2	13,228	Harston, Roy
13	7 November 1936	Accrington Stanley	A	3–0	3,334	Harston (2), Bungay
14	14 November 1936	Oldham Athletic	H	1–2	9,650	Rattray
15	21 November 1936	Port Vale	A	1–5	8,983	Atkinson
16	5 December 1936	Stockport County	A	1–3	5,913	Anderson
17	19 December 1936	Darlington	A	0–0	3,936	
18	25 December 1936	Crewe Alexandra	H	1–4	7,663	Roy
19	26 December 1936	Barrow	A	2–2	3,921	Harston (2)
20	28 December 1936	Crewe Alexandra	A	1–2	2,534	Littledyke
21	1 January 1937	Gateshead	A	3–3	4,753	Harston (2), Rattray
22	2 January 1937	York City	H	1–2	4,008	Harston
23	9 January 1937	Carlisle United	A	2–1	6,162	Atkinson, Wood
24	16 January 1937	Rotherham United	H	4–1	4,137	Atkinson, Harston, Horne (2)
25	23 January 1937	Hartlepools United	H	8–2	2,696	Rattray, Harston (7)
26	30 January 1937	Southport	A	2–3	3,558	Rattray, Harston
27	6 February 1937	Tranmere Rovers	H	2–3	6,348	Presgrave, Cartwright
28	13 February 1937	Halifax Town	A	0–0	4,970	
29	20 February 1937	Hull City	A	0–3	4,249	
30	27 February 1937	New Brighton	H	2–3	3,229	Harston, Anderson
31	6 March 1937	Lincoln City	A	0–2	7,877	
32	13 March 1937	Accrington Stanley	H	2–1	3,385	Harston, Anderson
33	20 March 1937	Oldham Athletic	A	1–1	6,497	Atkinson
34	26 March 1937	Chester	H	5–0	6,920	Atkinson, Anderson (2), Harston (2)
35	27 March 1937	Port Vale	H	7–1	6,348	Anderson, Harston (5), Wood
36	29 March 1937	Chester	A	1–5	9,448	Harston
37	30 March 1937	Wrexham	H	3–0	4,579	Harston (3)
38	3 April 1937	Rotherham United	A	1–4	4,890	Anderson
39	10 April 1937	Stockport County	H	0–2	6,890	
40	17 April 1937	Wrexham	A	3–2	2,170	Rattray, Harston (2)
41	24 April 1937	Darlington	H	3–1	4,072	Harston (2), Cook
42	1 May 1937	Gateshead	H	3–2	3,123	Harston (2), Horne

=== FA Cup ===
Round	Date	Opponent	Venue	Result	Attendance	Scorers
R1	28 November 1936	Barrow	A	4–0	7,231	Harston (3), Anderson
R2	12 December 1936	Bournemouth & Boscombe Athletic	H	0–3	11,200	

=== Football League Third Division North Cup ===
Round	Date	Opponent	Venue	Result	Attendance	Scorers
R1	11 November 1936	Port Vale	H	0–2	1,008	

== Squad statistics ==
- Squad list sourced from 1936–37 Mansfield Town F.C. season at the English National Football Archive (subscription required)

Pos.	Name	League		FA Cup		Third Division Cup		Total	
Pos.	Name	Apps	Goals	Apps	Goals	Apps	Goals	Apps	Goals
GK	(England) Daniel Black	28	0	0	0	1	0	29	0
GK	(Wales) Ormond Jones	14	0	2	0	0	0	16	0
DF	(England) Reg Bungay	28	1	0	0	0	0	28	1
DF	(England) Ted Dransfield	2	0	0	0	0	0	2	0
DF	(England) Ernie Hart	28	0	2	0	0	0	30	0
DF	(England) Jack Moran	19	0	2	0	0	0	21	0
DF	(England) Frank Perfect	13	0	2	0	1	0	16	0
DF	(England) Cyril Poole	1	0	0	0	0	0	1	0
DF	(England) Ted Vaux	26	0	0	0	1	0	27	0
DF	(England) Ernest Wright	0	0	0	0	1	0	1	0
MF	(England) Alf Brown	32	0	2	0	1	0	35	0
MF	(England) Fred Speed	34	1	1	0	1	0	36	1
MF	(England) Bill Wainwight	3	0	0	0	0	0	3	0
MF	(England) Leonard Wood	26	2	1	0	0	0	27	2
FW	(Scotland) George Anderson	19	8	2	1	0	0	21	9
FW	(England) Arthur Atkinson	40	10	2	0	1	0	43	10
FW	(England) Roy Briggs	2	0	0	0	0	0	2	0
FW	(England) Herbert Cartwright	5	1	0	0	1	0	6	1
FW	(England) Ron Cook	2	1	0	0	0	0	2	1
FW	(England) Ted Harston	41	55	2	3	1	0	44	58
FW	(England) Amos Hill	1	0	0	0	0	0	1	0
FW	(England) Matthew Hill	1	0	0	0	0	0	1	0
FW	(England) Alf Horne	22	3	0	0	0	0	22	3
FW	(England) Robert Littledyke	9	1	0	0	0	0	9	1
FW	(England) Gordon Presgrave	5	1	0	0	0	0	5	1
FW	(England) Charlie Rattray	36	5	2	0	1	0	39	5
FW	(England) Jack Roy	25	2	2	0	1	0	28	2
