= 1934–35 Mansfield Town F.C. season =

Mansfield Town
1934–35 season
- Manager: Henry Martin, Charlie Bell
- Stadium: Field Mill
- Third Division North: 8th
- FA Cup: Third Round
- Third Division North Cup: First Round
Home colours

The 1934–35 season was Mansfield Town's fourth season in the Football League and third in the Third Division North. The Stags finished the campaign in 8th position with 47 points.

== Final league table ==
Pos	Team	Pld	W	D	L	GF	GA	GAv	Pts
6	Tranmere Rovers	42	20	11	11	74	55	1.345	51
7	Stockport County	42	22	3	17	90	72	1.250	47
8	Mansfield Town	42	19	9	14	75	62	1.210	47
9	Rotherham United	42	19	7	16	86	73	1.178	45
10	Chesterfield	42	17	10	15	71	52	1.365	44

Source: rsssf.com

== Results ==
=== Football League Third Division North ===
Match	Date	Opponent	Venue	Result	Attendance	Scorers
1	25 August 1934	Halifax Town	A	1–2	9,386	Hawley
2	29 August 1934	Lincoln City	H	3–4	8,669	Johnson, Atkinson, Bytheway
3	1 September 1934	Rotherham United	H	2–1	6,588	Johnson (2)
4	3 September 1934	Lincoln City	A	0–4	8,376	
5	8 September 1934	Walsall	A	2–2	7,011	Johnson, Dellow
6	15 September 1934	Chesterfield	H	1–0	8,424	Dellow
7	19 September 1934	Accrington Stanley	A	0–2	1,604	
8	22 September 1934	Stockport County	A	2–0	5,932	Atkinson, Kilcar
9	29 September 1934	Barrow	A	0–3	3,927	
10	6 October 1934	Carlisle United	H	3–0	5,069	Atkinson, Dellow (2)
11	13 October 1934	Rochdale	A	0–1	3,684	
12	20 October 1934	Crewe Alexandra	H	4–1	5,753	Kilcar, Parker, Dransfield, Hunt
13	27 October 1934	Hartlepools United	A	1–1	2,206	Johnson
14	3 November 1934	Doncaster Rovers	H	2–0	5,628	Atkinson, Johnson
15	10 November 1934	Southport	A	2–1	2,827	Atkinson, Dellow
16	17 November 1934	Chester	H	1–1	6,402	Hunt
17	1 December 1934	York City	H	5–1	5,227	Dellow (2), Atkinson, Hunt, Johnson
18	15 December 1934	Accrington Stanley	H	2–1	4,327	Atkinson, Edmonds
19	22 December 1934	Gateshead	A	2–2	2,028	Hunt, Dellow
20	25 December 1934	Wrexham	H	4–0	9,554	Atkinson, Dellow, Hunt, Johnson
21	26 December 1934	Wrexham	A	3–1	9,115	Dellow, Johnson, Bytheway
22	29 December 1934	Halifax Town	H	4–0	8,144	Johnson (2), Hunt (2)
23	5 January 1935	Rotherham United	A	0–3	5,740	
24	16 January 1935	New Brighton	A	1–2	2,075	Edmonds
25	19 January 1935	Walsall	H	4–2	5,251	Johnson (2), Hunt, Bytheway
26	26 January 1935	Chesterfield	A	0–0	5,026	
27	2 February 1935	Stockport County	H	3–2	5,295	Bytheway, Hunt, Atkinson
28	9 February 1935	Barrow	H	3–2	5,204	Bytheway (2), Hunt
29	23 February 1935	Rochdale	H	1–0	4,788	Edmonds
30	2 March 1935	Crewe Alexandra	A	1–1	3,720	Johnson
31	9 March 1935	Hartlepools United	H	2–1	4,006	Johnson, Bytheway
32	16 March 1935	Doncaster Rovers	A	1–2	15,764	Hunt
33	23 March 1935	Southport	H	2–3	3,023	Hunt, Hunter
34	30 March 1935	Chester	A	2–3	5,160	Bytheway, Atkinson
35	6 April 1935	New Brighton	H	2–1	3,152	Hunt, Johnson
36	13 April 1935	York City	A	1–2	3,504	Johnson
37	19 April 1935	Tranmere Rovers	H	4–2	6,876	Bytheway, Edmonds, Atkinson, Hunt
38	20 April 1935	Darlington	H	2–2	3,962	Atkinson, Bytheway
39	22 April 1935	Tranmere Rovers	A	0–3	3,916	
40	25 April 1935	Carlisle United	A	1–1	2,622	Bytheway
41	21 May 1935	Darlington	A	0–1	2,476	
42	4 May 1935	Gateshead	H	1–1	2,541	Bytheway

=== FA Cup ===
Round	Date	Opponent	Venue	Result	Attendance	Scorers
R1	24 November 1934	Accrington Stanley	H	6–1	7,750	Dellow, Atkinson, Johnson (2), Hunt (2)
R2	8 December 1934	Tranmere Rovers	H	4–2	12,000	Dellow, Hunt, Johnson (2)
R3	12 January 1935	Burnley	H	2–4	20,790	Johnson, Hunt

=== Football League Third Division North Cup ===
Round	Date	Opponent	Venue	Result	Attendance	Scorers
R1	30 January 1935	Chesterfield	A	1–8	1,501	Carr

== Squad statistics ==
- Squad list sourced from 1934–35 Mansfield Town F.C. season at the English National Football Archive (subscription required)

Pos.	Name	League		FA Cup		Third Division Cup		Total	
Pos.	Name	Apps	Goals	Apps	Goals	Apps	Goals	Apps	Goals
GK	(England) Des Fawcett	40	0	2	0	1	0	43	0
GK	(England) Arthur Jepson	2	0	1	0	0	0	3	0
DF	(England) Jack Ashley	38	0	3	0	1	0	42	0
DF	(England) George Barlow	4	0	0	0	0	0	4	0
DF	(England) Andrew Carr	12	0	1	0	1	1	14	1
DF	(England) Thomas Cooke	7	0	0	0	0	0	7	0
DF	(England) Ted Dransfield	34	1	3	0	1	0	38	1
DF	Ernie England	23	0	2	0	0	0	25	0
DF	(England) Clarence Hufton	3	0	0	0	0	0	3	0
MF	(England) Alf Edmonds	33	4	3	0	1	0	37	4
MF	(England) Bill Slack	31	0	3	0	0	0	34	0
MF	(England) Ernest Wright	15	0	0	0	1	0	16	0
FW	(England) Thomas Ashall	2	0	0	0	0	0	2	0
FW	(England) Arthur Atkinson	40	12	3	1	1	0	44	13
FW	(England) Wilfred Barks	4	0	0	0	1	0	5	0
FW	(England) George Bytheway	31	12	2	0	1	0	34	12
FW	(England) Ron Dellow	24	10	3	2	0	0	27	12
FW	(England) Sid Hawley	4	1	0	0	1	0	5	1
FW	(England) Wally Hunt	29	14	3	4	0	0	32	18
FW	(Scotland) Jimmy Hunter	16	1	0	0	0	0	16	1
FW	(England) Harry Johnson	39	17	3	5	0	0	42	22
FW	(Scotland) Steve Kilcar	10	2	0	0	0	0	10	2
FW	(Scotland) Alan Livingstone	10	0	0	0	0	0	10	0
FW	(England) Stanley Page	0	0	0	0	1	0	1	0
FW	(England) Ernie Parker	11	1	1	0	0	0	12	1
