= Fred Field =

Fred Field may refer to:

- Fred Field (footballer) (1914–2004), English footballer
- Fred A. Field (1850–1935), businessman and public official from Vermont
- Fred E. Field (1861–1931), American architect
- Fred Tarbell Field (1879–1950), judge in Massachusetts
- Fred Field (New York politician) (1932/33–2021), member of the New York State Assembly
