= Gabbitas =

Gabbitas is a surname. Notable people with the surname include:

- Brian Gabbitas (born 1935), English former professional rugby league footballer
- Christopher Gabbitas (born 1979), English choral conductor, lawyer and university professor
- Christina Gabbitas (born 1967), English children's author, poet, storyteller and voiceover artist
- Harry Gabbitas (1905–1954), English professional footballer
