= Michael Gilmore =

Michael Gilmore may refer to:

- Mikal Gilmore (born 1951), American writer and music journalist
- J. Michael Gilmore, U.S. Department of Defense official
- Michael S. Gilmore, American ophthalmologist
- Michael Gilmore (basketball), American-Belgian basketball player

== See also ==
- Mike Gilmore (disambiguation)
