= Harry Kinghorn =

Scottish footballer and manager

Henry McGill Kinghorn (1886–1955) was a Scottish football goalkeeper and manager.

== Playing career ==
Born in Midlothian, Kinghorn began his career with Arniston Rangers before going on to appear for Alloa Athletic and Scottish Football League side Leith Athletic. He transferred to English Football League club Sheffield Wednesday for the 1908-09 season but failed to establish himself as first choice, making 25 league appearances with the club in three seasons.

== Bournemouth ==
In 1923 he succeeded Vincent Kitcher as manager of Bournemouth & Boscombe Athletic F.C., a position he held until being replaced by Leslie Knighton in 1925. During the 1928-29 season Kinghorn played once for Bournemouth in the Football League. Kinghorn returned to the manager's chair in 1939 when Charlie Bell left and remained in charge until 1947 when Harry Lowe took over.
