= William Grundy =

William Grundy may refer to:

- William Grundy (footballer, fl. 1906–1911), midfielder for Blackpool and Bolton Wanderers
- William Grundy (footballer, born 1914) (1914 – after 1935), English footballer for Coventry City and Mansfield Town
- William Mitchell Grundy, English headmaster
- William Grundy, a character on the radio series The Archers
- Bill Grundy, English television presenter
- Bill Grundy (footballer), Australian rules footballer
