= Hufton =

Hufton is a surname. Notable people with this surname include:

- Clarence Hufton (1912–2002), English footballer
- Olwen Hufton (born 1938), British historian
- Ted Hufton (1892–1967), English footballer
