= Maxim Demin =

Russian businessman

- Occupation(s): Businessman, owner of AFC Bournemouth; 2011–2022

Maxim Victorovich Demin (born October 1969) is a Russian-born British businessman. In 2011, Demin became co-owner of then Football League side AFC Bournemouth with Eddie Mitchell, reportedly paying £850,000 for his share of the club. Subsequently in 2015 the club were promoted to the Premier League. In 2015, he sold a 25% share in the club to Peak 6 Investments. In 2019, he repurchased the 25% share in the club to become the sole shareholder. In December 2022, Demin sold his 100% stake as AFC Bournemouth owner to Black Knight Football Club, with its Managing General Partner, Vegas Golden Knights owner Bill Foley, becoming the new chairman of the club, ending Demin's 11 year association with AFC Bournemouth. Demin is also noted as one of the beneficiaries of the NK Celje football club, Slovenia.

Demin has been involved in the petrochemicals industry and as a trader. Demin was not targeted for sanctions by the UK government in response to Russia's February 2022 invasion of Ukraine. This is because he had become a UK citizen.

== Property ==
Demin spent £5 million on a mansion in Sandbanks (Dorset), having bought a 50% interest in the nearby professional football club, AFC Bournemouth.
