= Mike Gilmore =

Mike Gilmore may refer to:

- Mikal Gilmore (born 1951), American writer and music journalist
- Mike Gilmore (footballer) (1913–1966), English footballer
