= Baven Penton =

English footballer (1890–1967)

Personal information
- Full name: Harry Baven Penton
- Date of birth: 1890
- Place of birth: Boscombe, Bournemouth, England
- Date of death: 1967 (aged 76–77)
- Place of death: Droxford, Hampshire
- Position: Centre forward

Youth career
- Pokesdown

Senior career*
Years	Team	Apps	(Gls)
- Boscombe
1911–1912	Southampton	13	(3)
1912	Boscombe		
1912–1913	Southampton	1	(0)
1913–1914	Boscombe		
1914–1928	Eastleigh Athletic		
- * Club domestic league appearances and goals

Harry Baven Penton (1890–1967) was an English professional footballer who played as a centre-forward for Southampton and Boscombe prior to the First World War.

== Playing career ==
Penton was born in Boscombe, Bournemouth in early 1890 and was a prolific marksman in his minor league days, scoring 60 in one season with Pokesdown and 26 in another for Boscombe. His form attracted him to Southern League Southampton who were suffering from a lack of a suitable centre-forward, as the regular choice, Percy Prince was injured and replacement Sid Kimpton was not scoring regularly.

Penton moved across the New Forest in February 1911 and made his debut for Southampton at Crystal Palace on 25 February 1911, scoring in his home debut at The Dell in his next match (against Brentford). He retained his place until the end of the season, although he failed to live up to expectations with only three goals from twelve appearances. For the following season, the "Saints" signed Henry Hamilton and Penton only made one appearance, playing at inside-right in place of Archie Small on 16 September.

He returned to Boscombe in January 1912 for a fee of £10 and became their first ever professional player on a wage of 30 shillings (£1.50) per week. In September 1912 he returned to The Dell but made only one further appearance.

He once again returned across the New Forest to Boscombe, but in 1914 he joined Eastleigh Athletic where he remained until 1928, now playing as goalkeeper rather than centre-forward.
