= Eddie Mitchell =

English football club owner (1954/1955–2024)

Chairman of AFC Bournemouth
- In office June 2009 – September 2013
- Succeeded by: Maxim Demin

Personal details
- Born: 1954 or 1955
- Died: 17 February 2024 (aged 69)
- Children: 2
- Occupation: Property developer, sports executive

Eddie Mitchell (1954 or 1955 – 17 February 2024) was an English sports executive.

== Football career ==
Mitchell owned Dorchester Town FC. He was also involved in Poole Town F.C.. He was known as "Marmite Mitch".

Mitchell was the owner and chairman of AFC Bournemouth between June 2009 and September 2013, and oversaw the beginning rise of the team which moved up from League Two to the Championship. It was the first time this had happened since 1987. In September 2013, he stepped down as chair. His shares of the club were sold to Russian businessman Maxim Demin. Two weeks after he had sold the club, he was banned from spectating its games.

== Business career ==
Mitchell was a property developer and reportedly built more than 1,000 homes particularly in the Sandbanks area of Poole. In 2010 he paid for the restoration of Dean Court. In 2019, he opened the UK’s first technical football centre in Bournemouth. More recently, Mitchell owned Elite Skills Arena, a company manufacturing high technology football training products used notably by Barcelona.

== Personal life and death ==
In 2018, Mitchell suffered serious medical issues and underwent open-heart surgery at Southampton General Hospital.

Mitchell died on 17 February 2024, at the age of 69. Those who paid tribute included former Bournemouth manager Harry Redknapp.
