= Les Clenshaw =

English footballer

Personal information
- Full name: Leslie James Clenshaw
- Date of birth: 29 September 1905
- Place of birth: Poplar, England
- Date of death: 8 January 1985 (aged 79)
- Place of death: Southend-on-Sea, England
- Position: Winger

Senior career*
Years	Team	Apps	(Gls)
1923	Westcliff		
1924–1934	Southend United	132	(28)
1925	→ Chelmsford (loan)		
1934–1935	Barrow	33	(8)
1935–1936	Mansfield Town	27	(6)
1936	Chelmsford		
1937	Gaslight (Rayleigh)		
Total		192	(42)
- * Club domestic league appearances and goals

Leslie James Clenshaw (29 September 1905 – 8 January 1985) was an English professional footballer who played in the Football League for Barrow, Mansfield Town and Southend United.
