= Eddie Edmonds =

English footballer

Personal information
- Full name: Alfred John Edmonds
- Date of birth: 16 October 1902
- Place of birth: Brighton, England
- Date of death: 25 March 1942 (aged 39)
- Place of death: Bury, Lancashire, England
- Height: 5 ft 9 in (1.75 m)
- Position: Utility player

Senior career*
Years	Team	Apps	(Gls)
- Vernon Athletic
- Allen West
1925–1929	Brighton & Hove Albion	14	(0)
1929–1932	Clapton Orient	89	(18)
1932–1934	Bury	13	(0)
1934–1935	Mansfield Town	33	(4)
- Manchester North End
- * Club domestic league appearances and goals

Alfred John Edmonds (16 October 1902 – 25 March 1942), known as Alf or Eddie Edmonds, was an English professional footballer who played in a variety of positions in the Football League for Brighton & Hove Albion, Clapton Orient, Bury and Mansfield Town.

Edmonds retired from full-time football in 1935 to become a publican, but continued to play on a part-time basis for Manchester North End. He killed himself with gas in Bury, Lancashire, in 1942 at the age of 39.
