= Ernie Parker (footballer) =

English footballer (1913–1983)

Personal information
- Full name: Ernest Simmonds Henry Parker
- Date of birth: 18 December 1913
- Place of birth: Anerley, England
- Date of death: 1983 (aged 69–70)
- Place of death: Brighton, England
- Height: 5 ft 10 1/2 in (1.79 m)
- Position: Winger

Senior career*
Years	Team	Apps	(Gls)
1931–1933	Anerley Argyle		
1933–1934	Crystal Palace	2	(0)
1934–1936	Mansfield Town	15	(4)
1936–1937	Bournemouth & Boscombe Athletic	7	(0)
1937–1938	Bristol Rovers	9	(1)
1938	Dartford		
1939	Shorts Sports		
- * Club domestic league appearances and goals

Ernest Simmonds Henry Parker (18 December 1913 – 1983) was an English professional footballer who played in the Football League for Bournemouth & Boscombe Athletic, Bristol Rovers, Crystal Palace and Mansfield Town.
