= Thomas Cooke (footballer, born 1913) =

English footballer

Personal information
- Full name: Thomas Vincent Cooke
- Date of birth: 10 September 1913
- Place of birth: Melton Mowbray, England
- Date of death: 1974 (aged 60–61)
- Height: 6 ft 0 in (1.83 m)
- Position: Full back

Senior career*
Years	Team	Apps	(Gls)
1932–1933	Sheepbridge		
1933–1934	New Brighton	0	(0)
1934–1936	Mansfield Town	13	(0)
1936–1938	Bournemouth & Boscombe Athletic	19	(0)
1938–1939	Luton Town	0	(0)
1939	Sutton Town		
- * Club domestic league appearances and goals

Thomas Vincent Cooke (10 September 1913 – 1974) was an English professional footballer who played in the Football League for Bournemouth & Boscombe Athletic and Mansfield Town.
