= Joe Allen (footballer, born 1909) =

English footballer

Personal information
- Full name: Joseph Allen
- Date of birth: 30 December 1909
- Place of birth: Bilsthorpe, England
- Date of death: 1978 (aged 68–69)
- Position: Inside forward

Senior career*
Years	Team	Apps	(Gls)
1932	Tottenham Hotspur	0	(0)
1932–1934	→ Northfleet United (loan)	?	(?)
1932–1933	Tottenham Hotspur	1	(1)
1932–1933	Queens Park Rangers F.C.	51	(6)
1933–1934	Mansfield Town	8	(5)
1935–1937	RC Roubaix	?	(?)
1937	FC Nancy	?	
- * Club domestic league appearances and goals

Joseph Allen (30 December 1909 – October 1978) was a professional footballer who played for Northfleet, Tottenham Hotspur, Queens Park Rangers, Mansfield Town, Racing Club de Roubaix, and FC Nancy.

== Football career ==
Allen played for local club Bilsthorpe Colliery before joining Tottenham Hotspur for his first spell at White Hart Lane in 1932.

In the same year he moved to the Spurs nursery club Northfleet United on loan. The inside forward rejoined the Lilywhites where he scored one goal in his solitary match for the club. A 1-1 draw with Bradford City at White Hart Lane in April 1933, in a season where Tottenham would be promoted from the old Second Division.

In 1933 he signed for Queens Park Rangers where he went on to feature in 51 matches and scoring on six occasions for the Loftus Road outfit.

Allen moved to Mansfield Town and competed in a further eight games and netting five goals.

He ended his career in France playing for RC Roubaix and then FC Nancy.
