= Ted Wass (footballer) =

English footballer

Personal information
- Full name: Edwin Wass
- Date of birth: 1910
- Place of birth: Chesterfield, England
- Date of death: 4 February 1955 (aged 44–45)
- Place of death: Old Whittington, England
- Height: 5 ft 10 in (1.78 m)
- Positions: Centre half; right back; left back

Senior career*
Years	Team	Apps	(Gls)
	Sheepbridge	?	(?)
	Old Whittington Evening School	?	(?)
1929	Chesterfield	3	(0)
1931–1939	York City	222	(0)
- * Club domestic league appearances and goals

Edwin Wass (1910 – 4 February 1955) was an English footballer.

== Career ==
Wass was on Chesterfield's books before he moved to York City in September 1931. Within two years, he had established himself in York's first team and for five years he was a regular in the team's defence. He was granted a benefit match in May 1939 against Newcastle United.

== Personal life ==
During World War II, he served in the Royal Navy and suffered serious wounds when his minesweeper was sunk off Crete. He died in 1955.
