= Herbert Cartwright =

English footballer (born 1916)

Personal information
- Full name: Herbert Cartwright
- Date of birth: 1916
- Place of birth: Pleasley, England
- Position: Inside forward

Senior career*
Years	Team	Apps	(Gls)
1933–1934	Brunts Old Boys		
1934–1935	Rotherham United	0	(0)
1935–1936	Brunts Old Boys		
1936–1937	Mansfield Town	5	(1)
1937	Brunts Old Boys		
1938	Woodhouse Mills United		
Total		5	(1)
- * Club domestic league appearances and goals

Herbert Cartwright (1916 – after 1937) was an English professional footballer who played in the Football League for Mansfield Town.
