= Ted Vaux =

English footballer

Personal information
- Full name: Edward Vaux
- Date of birth: 2 September 1916
- Place of birth: Goole, England
- Date of death: 6 April 2002 (aged 85)
- Place of death: Doncaster, England
- Height: 5 ft 9 in (1.75 m)
- Position: Full back

Senior career*
Years	Team	Apps	(Gls)
1932–1933	Thorne Colliery		
1933–1934	Goole Town		
1934–1935	Doncaster Rovers	0	(0)
1936–1938	Mansfield Town	29	(0)
1938–1939	Chelsea	0	(0)
1949–1950	Peterborough United	7	(0)
- Glentoran
–1950	Gainsborough Trinity		
Total		37	(0)
- * Club domestic league appearances and goals

Edward Vaux (2 September 1916 – 6 April 2002) was an English professional footballer who played in the Football League for Mansfield Town as a full back.

== Career statistics ==
Appearances and goals by club, season and competition
Club	Season	League			National Cup		Total	
Club	Season	Division	Apps	Goals	Apps	Goals	Apps	Goals
Peterborough United	1948–49	Midland League	7	0	2	0	9	0
Career total			7	0	2	0	9	0
