= Jack Roy =

English footballer

Personal information
- Full name: John Robin Roy
- Date of birth: 23 March 1914
- Place of birth: Woolston, Southampton, England
- Date of death: 1980 (aged 65–66)
- Height: 5 ft 10 in (1.78 m)
- Position: Winger

Senior career*
Years	Team	Apps	(Gls)
1932–1933	Sholing Athletic		
1933–1936	Norwich City	6	(0)
1936–1937	Mansfield Town	25	(2)
1937–1938	Sheffield Wednesday	15	(1)
1938	Notts County	15	(0)
1938	Tranmere Rovers	20	(2)
1939	Yeovil & Petters United		
1946–1947	Ipswich Town	15	(2)
1947	Gravesend & Northfleet		
1948	Yeovil Town		
Total		96	(7)
- * Club domestic league appearances and goals

John Robin Roy (23 March 1914 – 1980) was an English professional footballer who played in the Football League for Ipswich Town, Mansfield Town, Norwich City, Notts County, Sheffield Wednesday and Tranmere Rovers.
