= Gordon Presgrave =

English footballer

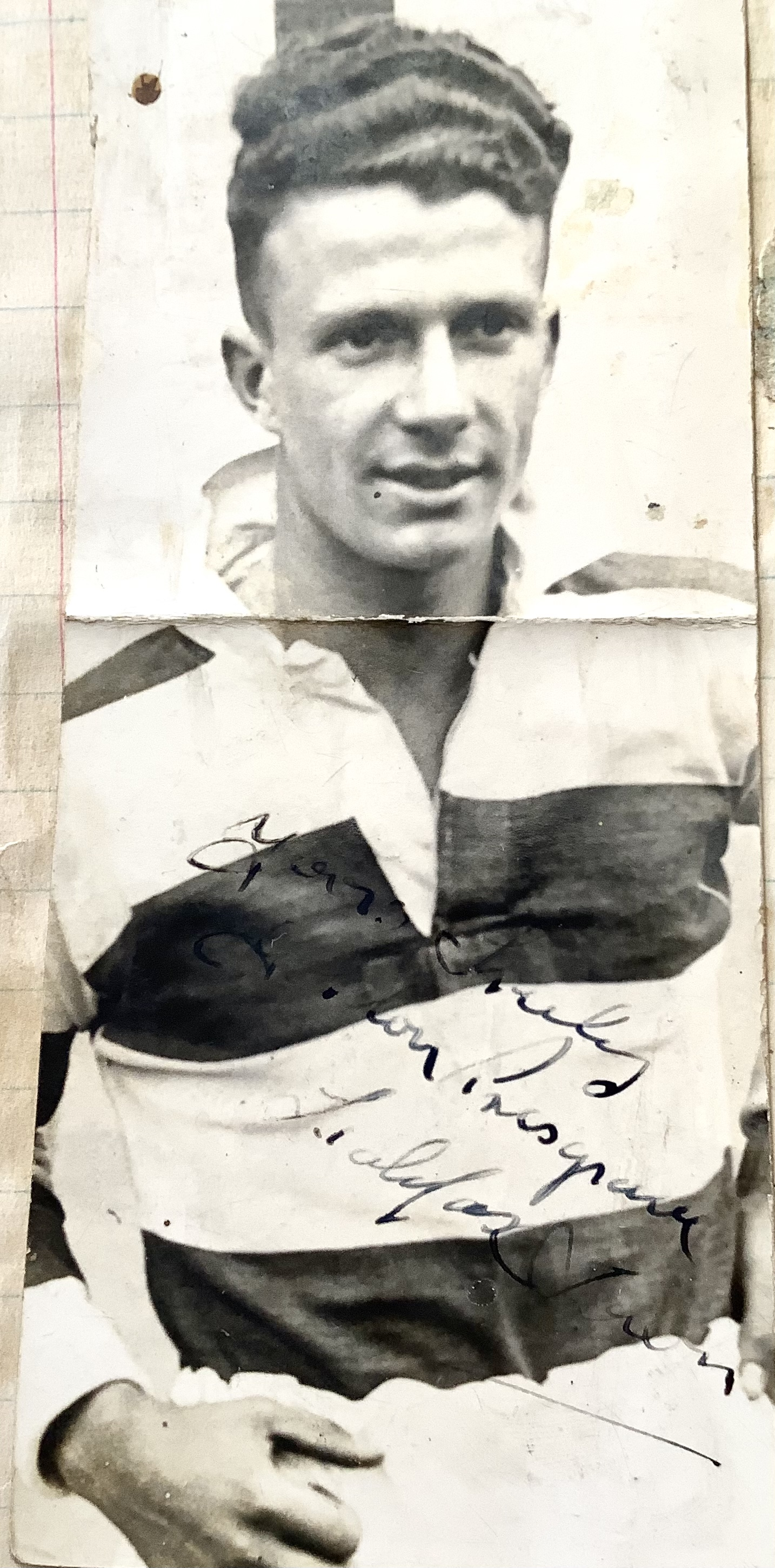

Personal information
- Full name: Gordon Edwin Presgrave
- Date of birth: 5 January 1915
- Place of birth: Kippax, West Riding of Yorkshire, England
- Date of death: 1976 (aged 60–61)
- Position: Winger

Senior career*
Years	Team	Apps	(Gls)
1932–1933	Worksop Town		
1933–1936	Halifax Town	21	(5)
1936–1937	Carlisle United	5	(1)
1937	Mansfield Town	5	(1)
1937	Worksop Town		
Total		31	(7)
- * Club domestic league appearances and goals

Gordon Edwin Presgrave (5 January 1915 – 1976) was an English professional footballer who played in the Football League for Carlisle United, Halifax Town and Mansfield Town.

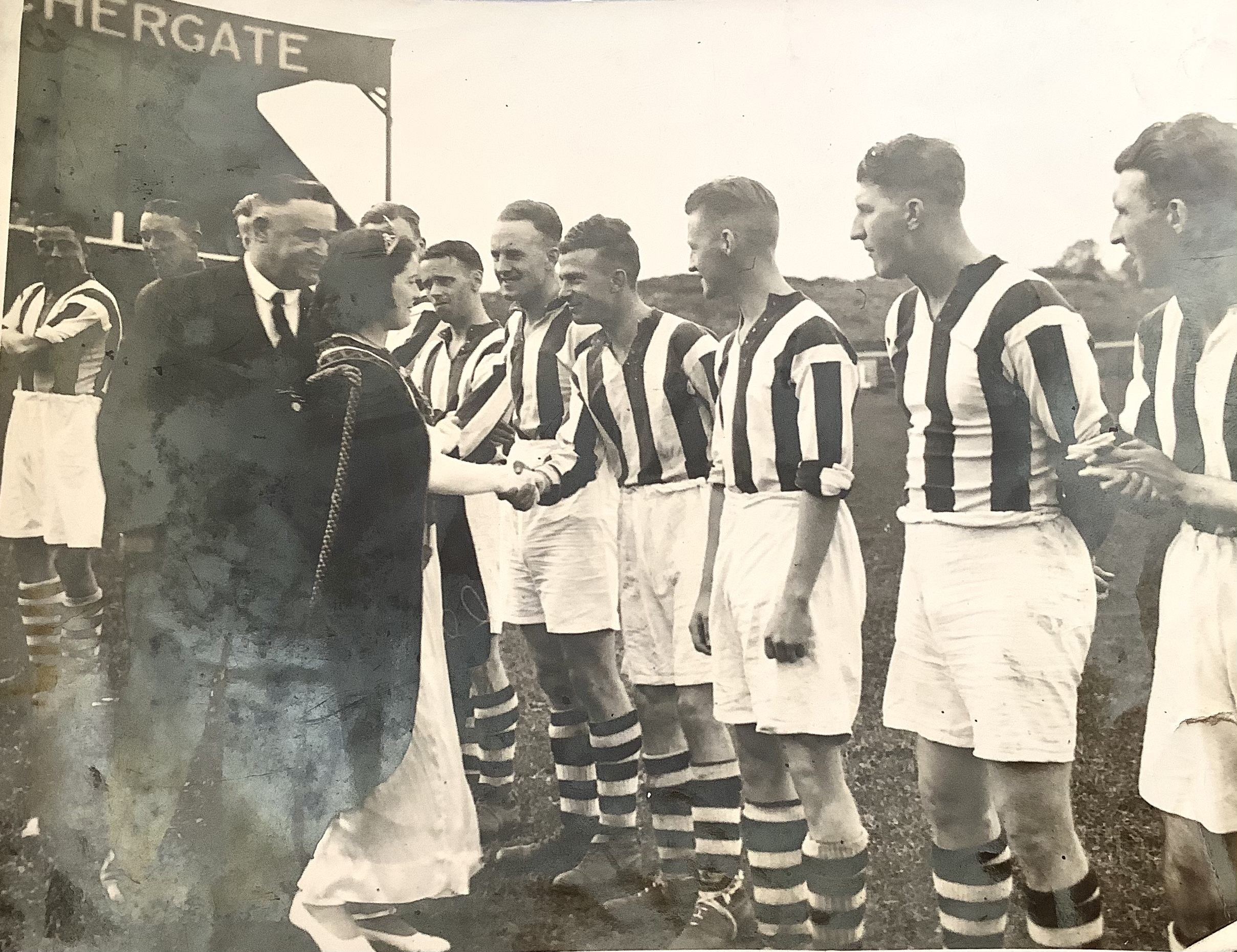
1930's Halifax Town FC - Gordon Edwin Presgrave centre photo

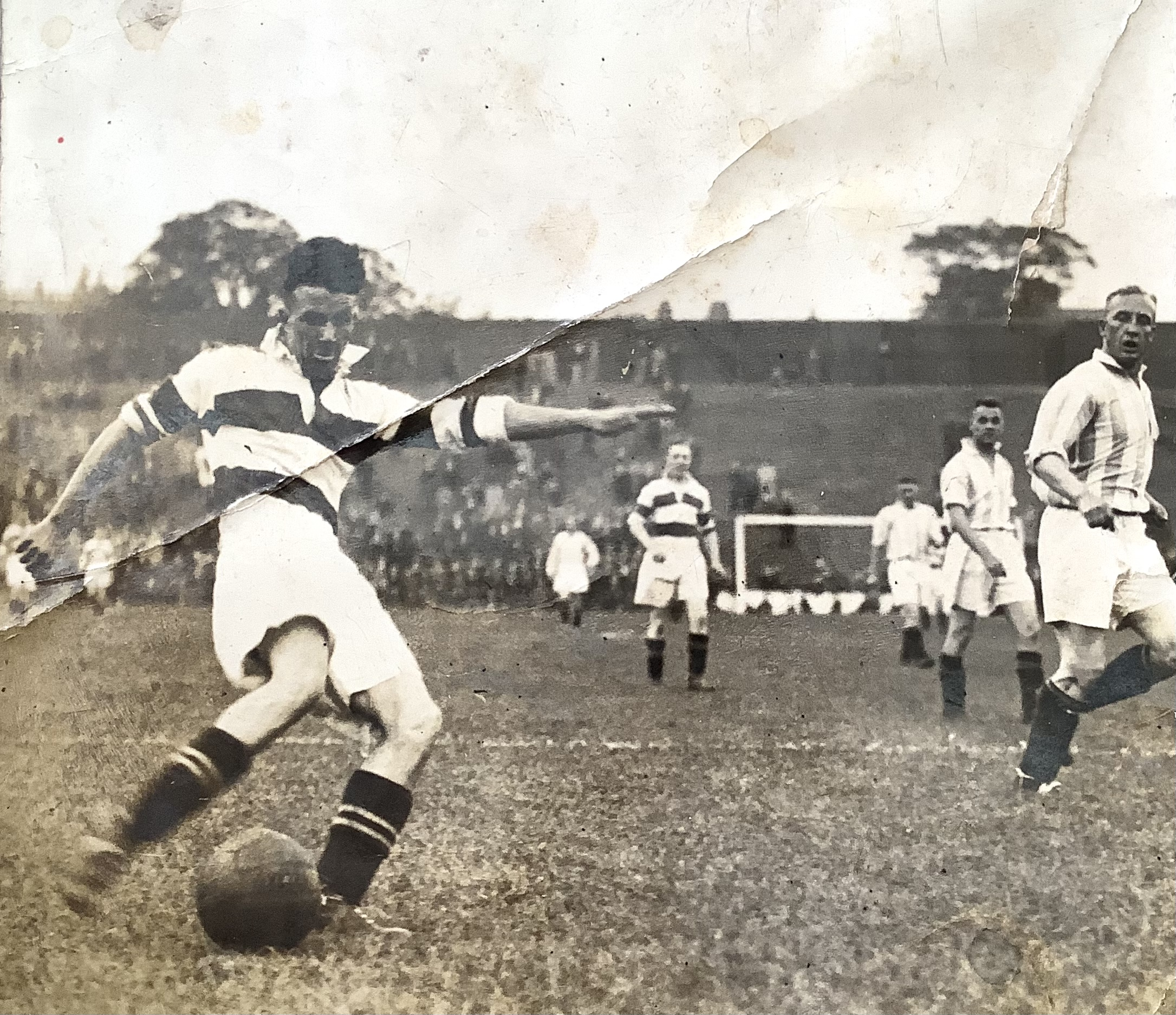
Gordon Edwin Presgrave playing right wing for Halifax Town FC 1930's
