= Robert Littledyke =

English footballer

Personal information
- Full name: Robert Littledyke
- Date of birth: 5 July 1913
- Place of birth: Chester-le-Street, England
- Date of death: 1990 (aged 76–77)
- Height: 5 ft 8 1/2 in (1.74 m)
- Position: Centre forward

Senior career*
Years	Team	Apps	(Gls)
1934–1935	City of Durham		
1935–1936	Lincoln City	9	(0)
1936–1937	Mansfield Town	9	(1)
1937	Grantham		
Total		18	(1)
- * Club domestic league appearances and goals

Robert Littledyke (5 July 1913 – 1990) was an English professional footballer who played in the Football League for Lincoln City and Mansfield Town.
