= Amos Hill =

English footballer

Personal information
- Full name: Amos Montague Hill
- Date of birth: 21 June 1910
- Place of birth: Wath-on-Dearne, England
- Date of death: 1973 (aged 62–63)
- Height: 5 ft 9 in (1.75 m)
- Position: Winger

Senior career*
Years	Team	Apps	(Gls)
1934	Hawson Street		
1935–1937	Lincoln City	14	(5)
1937	Mansfield Town	1	(0)
Total		15	(5)
- * Club domestic league appearances and goals

Amos Montague Hill (21 June 1910 – 1973) was an English professional footballer who played in the Football League for Lincoln City and Mansfield Town.
