= Michael S. Gilmore =

Michael S. Gilmore is an American, focusing in infectious diseases and ocular genomics, currently the Sir William Osler Professor of Ophthalmology (Microbiology), Harvard Medical School, Mike serves as Director of the Infectious Disease Institute, and Co-Director of the Microbial Sciences Initiative of Harvard University. Additionally, he is a Senior Associate Member of the Broad Institute. As Principal Investigator of the Harvard-wide Program on Antibiotic Resistance, his research focuses on the evolution and development of multidrug resistant strains of enterococci, staphylococci, and streptococci, and the development of new therapeutics. He was named by Eric Lander in “The Heroes of CRISPR”^{3} as inspiring Broad Institute interest in developing CRISPR as a tool for therapeutic gene editing. Mike has trained over 35 graduate students and postdocs, and is currently course coordinator and principal lecturer in the Harvard University course OEB290/MICRO210 Microbiology: Chemistry, ecology and evolution. Outside of Harvard, he serves as chair of the US National Institutes of Health (NIH) blue ribbon panel for the Antimicrobial Resistance Diagnostic Challenge. He is past chair of the NIH Bacterial Pathogenesis Study Section, the Gordon Conference on Microbial Adhesion and Signal Transduction, American Society for Microbiology (ASM) Division D, and the Association for Research in Vision and Ophthalmology (ARVO) IM Section. Mike is founder of the International Conference on Enterococci (ICE) series, and the Boston Area Antibiotic Resistance Network (BAARN). He started his academic career in 1984 at the University of Oklahoma Health Sciences Center, where he rose through the ranks to Vice President for Research. He also held the MG McCool professorship and was awarded the George Lynn Cross research chair. In 2004 he moved to Harvard Medical School as President and CEO of the Schepens Eye Research Institute, Marie and DeWalt Ankeny Director of Research and CL Schepens Professor of Ophthalmology. In 2010, he moved his laboratories to the Massachusetts General Hospital campus, in the Massachusetts Eye and Ear Infirmary. He has published over 200 peer reviewed manuscripts in Cell, Nature, Science, PNAS and other leading journals. He continues to serve on numerous advisory boards and committees for public and private organizations, focused on drug discovery, antibiotic resistance, and bacterial pathogenesis.
