= Ron Cook (footballer) =

English footballer

Personal information
- Full name: Ronald Cook
- Date of birth: 23 September 1917
- Place of birth: South Normanton, England
- Date of death: 1998 (aged 90–91)
- Position: Inside forward

Senior career*
Years	Team	Apps	(Gls)
1935–1936	Ripley Town		
1936–1937	Mansfield Town	2	(1)
Total		2	(1)
- * Club domestic league appearances and goals

Ronald Cook (23 September 1917 – 1998) was an English professional footballer who played in the Football League for Mansfield Town.
