= Roy Briggs =

English footballer

Personal information
- Full name: Roy Briggs
- Date of birth: 1 November 1920
- Place of birth: Mansfield, England
- Date of death: 1995 (aged 74–75)
- Position: Winger

Senior career*
Years	Team	Apps	(Gls)
1935	Mansfield Shoe Company		
1936–1937	Mansfield Town	2	(0)
Total		2	(0)
- * Club domestic league appearances and goals

Roy Briggs (1 November 1920 – 1995) was an English professional footballer who played in the Football League for Mansfield Town.
