= Christina Gabbitas =

English writer

- Born: 7 December 1967 (age 58); Blackburn, Lancashire, England
- Occupations: Children's author, poet, storyteller, voiceover artist
- Writing career
- Notable works: Felicity Fly; Share Some Secrets
- Website: christinagabbitas.com

Christina Gabbitas (born 7 December 1967) is an English children's author, poet, storyteller and voiceover artist. She is best known for her books and campaigning about the dangers of county lines and knife crime.

Gabbitas grew up in Blackburn, Lancashire before moving to Yorkshire as a young adult. Growing up she loved to read poetry and rhymes. She started writing after having her own children and particularly focussed on stories which would help them overcome their fears and fears that she had, had as a child.

== Career ==
=== County Lines and Knife Crime ===
In 2019, Gabbitas was approached by the Office of the Police and Crime Commissioner for Humberside to write a story about knife crime and county lines to be used as a resource to warn young people about the dangers of being involved. The book, entitled No More Knives, was launched in 2020 and subsequently turned into an animation, which was showcased at an event in February 2021.

After taking workshops into schools and to literature festivals across the country, Gabbitas partnered with North Yorkshire Police in 2023 to write a sequel to 'No More Knives', entitled 'Trapped in County Lines'. She continues to take her work into schools and can be frequently heard on the radio as part of her campaign to raise awareness.

=== Felicity Fly Series ===
In 2012 Gabbitas published her first book Welcome To The World Of Felicity Fly. It uses characters such as a washing machine and a woodlouse to talk about fears children may have in the home. They are encouraged to not feel alone and that having fears is normal. This was quickly followed by Felicity Fly Meets Veronica Vac. Whilst still tackling the subject of childhood fears, this book also focuses on individuals caring and helping one another. A year later Felicity Fly In The Garden was published this time addressing the subject of pollination. The fourth book in the series Felicity Fly Meets the Dragon Fruit and Friends came out in early 2015 and takes as its main theme healthy food.

=== Other publications for children ===
Gabbitas published a book called Share Some Secrets in November 2014, which highlights the difference between good and troublesome secrets, and encourages children who are being abused to speak out. It is aimed at five to eight year olds. The book was endorsed by the NSPCC, placed in their library and distributed through their school service. A percentage of sales from the book go to Barnardo's in their 15th anniversary year for 2016. The book was endorsed by Barnardo's, and also a finalist in the People's Book Prize 2016.

In October 2017 the book was animated by students from Sheffield Hallam University. The launch was covered by the Guardian and Gabbitas was interviewed by Radio 5 Live about the book and animation. In October 2018 Gabbitas was made an Honorary Member of the National Society for the Prevention of Cruelty to Children (NSPCC) Council for her dedication to child protection and her fundraising efforts on behalf of the children's charity. The book continues to raise funds for the charity, as it is featured in their bookshop and Gabbitas has twice run the London marathon in support of the charity, as well as taking part in numerous other events.

Triangular Trev and the Shape Idols, published in October 2016, is a picture rhyming book that teaches children about mathematical terminology with fun. Gabbitas was interviewed on BBC Radio shortly after the launch of this book and it was well received, including being a finalist in the People's Book Prize, the third year in a row Gabbitas had, had a book in the final.

In 2018, Gabbitas launched a book to raise awareness of plastic pollution in our oceans, entitled Save Us. She followed this up in 2019 with a national rap competition for schools to engage pupils with the subject.

=== Commissions ===
Gabbitas has also been commissioned by various organisations to write stories on specific topics or stories to tackle specific issues. In 2019 Gabbitas worked in partnership with York Castle Museum to produce a story featuring some of their toy exhibits. The book was also entered into the People's Book Prize.

During the COVID-19 pandemic in the United Kingdom of 2020/21, Gabbitas was commissioned by Blackburn Business Improvement District (BID) to write a story about her home town to help promote the town during the difficulties of the pandemic.

== Charity work ==
Gabbitas is a trustee of the Children's Literature Festival charity, which she set up. Its patrons include award-winning actress Jenny Agutter and Michael Bradley (musician) of band The Undertones. The charity holds free literature festivals for children and families in places including Blackburn and Selby.

Gabbitas received recognition for her work with the Children's Literature Festival charity in 2023, when she was first chosen as one of only 500 Coronation Champions for the coronation of Charles III, and secondly, she was awarded a Prime Minister's Points of Light Award in the same year.

== Book Awards ==
Felicity Fly meets Veronica Vac was voted into the final of the People's Book Prize 2014. The second volume of poetry published from the eight line rhyme initiative in September 2014 gained Gabbitas the Dame Beryl Bainbridge First Time Author Award at The People's Book Prize at a ceremony in London in 2015. The book takes creatures and food as its themes.

In 2016 Gabbitas received the Sue Ryder Yorkshire Women of Achievement award in education for encouraging and making an impact educating children through her work.

Gabbitas received a further award in May 2019 when her book Share Some Secrets won the Best Achievement category in the People's Book Prize.
