= Bill Wainwight =

English footballer

Personal information
- Full name: William Thomas Wainwight
- Date of birth: 28 October 1917
- Place of birth: Worksop, England
- Date of death: 1976 (aged 58–59)
- Position: Wing half

Senior career*
| Years | Team | Apps | (Gls) |
| 1935 | Worksop Town | | |
| 1936–1937 | Mansfield Town | 3 | (0) |
| 1937–1946 | Aldershot | 10 | (0) |
| Total | | 13 | (0) |
- * Club domestic league appearances and goals

William Thomas Wainwight (28 October 1917 – 1976) was an English professional footballer who played in the Football League for Aldershot and Mansfield Town.
