= Fred Field (New York politician) =

American politician (died 2021)

Fred Field (1932/33 – March 12, 2021) was an American politician who served as a member of the New York State Assembly for the 103rd district and as supervisor of the Town of Colonie.

Prior to his political career, Field worked as a steel worker for thirty years. His first elected office was on the Colonie Town Board, where he served for seven years. He then served in the New York State Assembly for ten years. In 1977, Field was elected as the supervisor of the town of Colonie. He held the position for 18 years, retiring on New Years' Eve 1995. As supervisor, Field was credited with establishing Colonie's sewers and starting its EMS department.
