= Thomas Ashall =

English footballer

Personal information
- Full name: Thomas Ashall
- Date of birth: 16 October 1915
- Place of birth: Doncaster, England
- Date of death: 1976 (aged 60–61)
- Position: Winger

Senior career*
Years	Team	Apps	(Gls)
1934–1935	Mansfield Town	2	(0)
1936	Nuneaton Town		
- * Club domestic league appearances and goals

Thomas Ashall (16 October 1915 – 1976) was an English professional footballer who played in the Football League for Mansfield Town.
