= Mike Gilmore (footballer) =

English footballer

Personal information
- Full name: Henry Patrick Gilmore
- Date of birth: 17 November 1913
- Place of birth: West Hartlepool, England
- Date of death: 1966 (aged 52–53)
- Height: 5 ft 10 1/2 in (1.79 m)
- Position: Wing half

Senior career*
Years	Team	Apps	(Gls)
1932	West Hartlepool St Joseph's		
1933–1934	Shotton Colliery Welfare		
1934–1935	Hull City	0	(0)
1935–1936	Mansfield Town	20	(0)
1936–1937	Bournemouth & Boscombe Athletic	13	(0)
1937	Runcorn		
1938–1939	Queens Park Rangers	6	(0)
1939–1940	Hull City	0	(0)
1946	Queens Park Rangers	0	(0)
Total		39	(0)
- * Club domestic league appearances and goals

Henry Patrick Gilmore (7 November 1913 – 1966) was an English professional footballer who played in the Football League for Bournemouth & Boscombe Athletic, Mansfield Town and Queens Park Rangers. Gilmore also made guest appearances for Newcastle United in the interwar years. He also served as Gunner in the Royal Navy during WWII.
