= Gerald Darvill =

English footballer

Personal information
- Full name: Gerald Moffatt Darvill
- Date of birth: 20 March 1916
- Place of birth: High Wycombe, England
- Date of death: 1973 (aged 56–57)
- Position: Full back

Senior career*
Years	Team	Apps	(Gls)
1933–1934	Wycombe Wanderers		
1934–1935	Reading	0	(0)
1935–1936	Mansfield Town	13	(0)
1936	Wolverhampton Wanderers	0	(0)
Total		13	(0)
- * Club domestic league appearances and goals

Gerald Moffatt Darvill (20 March 1916 – 1973) was an English professional footballer who played in the Football League for Mansfield Town.
