= Ron Dellow =

English footballer and manager

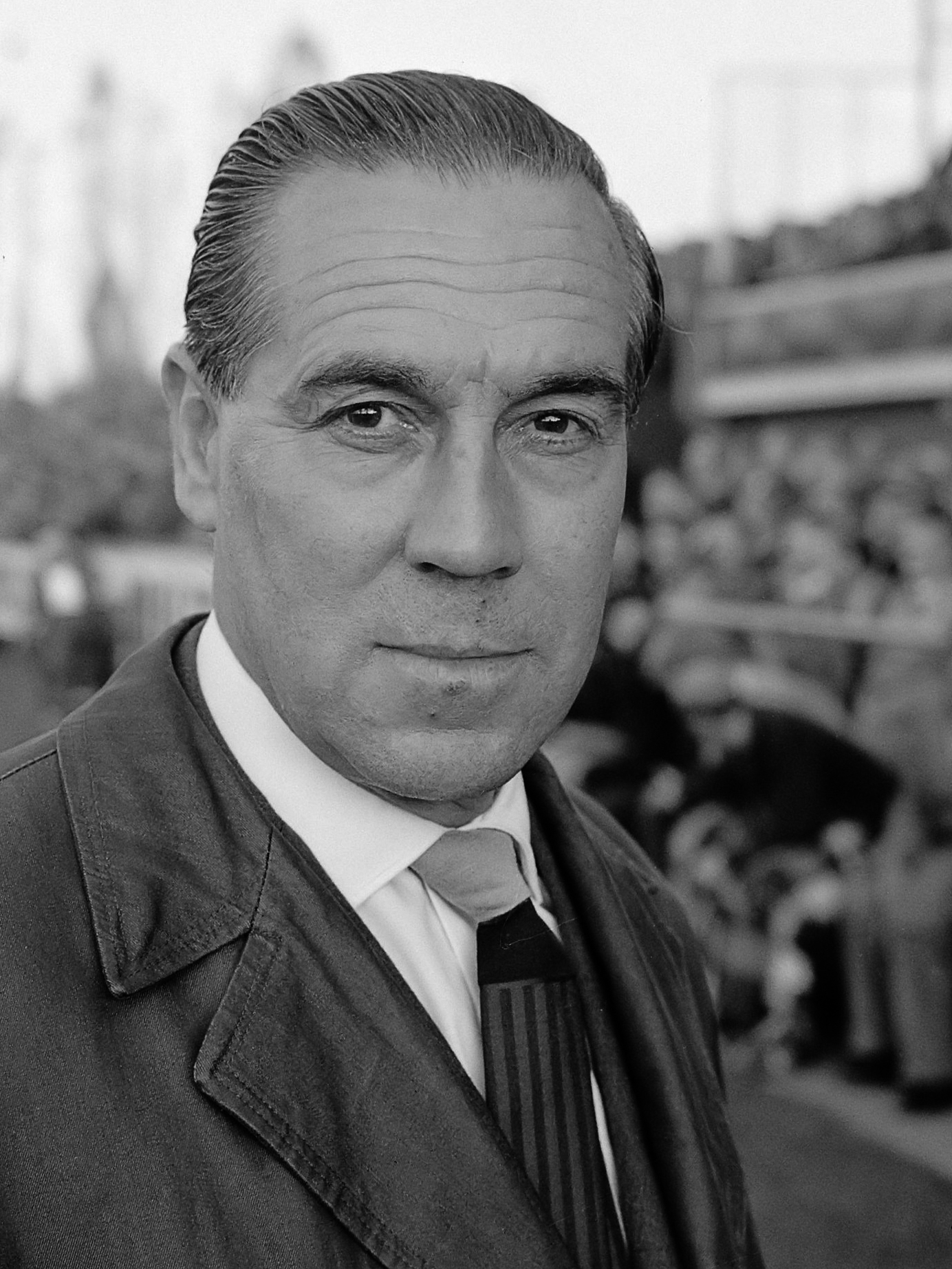
- Ron Dellow (1964)

Personal information
- Full name: Ronald William Dellow
- Date of birth: 13 July 1914
- Place of birth: Crosby, England
- Date of death: 7 November 2013 (aged 99)
- Place of death: Almelo, Netherlands
- Height: 5 ft 8 1/2 in (1.74 m)
- Position: Outside right

Senior career*
Years	Team	Apps	(Gls)
1933–1934	Blackburn Rovers	0	(0)
1934–1935	Mansfield Town	24	(10)
1935–1936	Manchester City	10	(4)
1936–1939	Tranmere Rovers	105	(29)
1939–1947	Carlisle United	16	(5)

Managerial career
- Hermes DVS
- 1952–1953: HBS Craeyenhout
- Blauw-Wit Amsterdam
- 1956–1958: HVV Helmond
- 1958–1959: Holland Sport
- 1960–1961: HBS Craeyenhout
- 1964–1969: FC Volendam
- 1969–1970: GVAV
- 1972–1974: Heracles Almelo
- 1975–1977: Helmond Sport
- * Club domestic league appearances and goals

Ron Dellow (13 July 1914 – 7 November 2013) was an English footballer and coach. As a player, he was a right-winger who began his professional career at Blackburn Rovers, and later played for Mansfield Town, Manchester City and Tranmere Rovers in the years before World War II. In August 1939, he joined Carlisle United, but because of the war, he had to wait seven years before making his debut for the club in an official league game. He played one post-war season for Carlisle.

During the Second World War, Dellow served in the RAF. In 1948, Dellow moved to the Netherlands. He coached HVV Helmond, Holland Sport, FC Volendam between 1964 and 1969, and guided the club to promotion to the Eredivisie in 1967. He also coached GVAV, Heracles Almelo and Helmond Sport in the 1970s.

After retiring from football, Dellow spent his retirement years in Almelo. He died on 7 November 2013, aged 99.
