= Sid Hawley =

English footballer

Personal information
- Full name: Sidney Hawley
- Date of birth: 25 January 1909
- Place of birth: Langwith, Derbyshire, England
- Date of death: 1971 (aged 66–67)
- Position: Inside forward

Senior career*
Years	Team	Apps	(Gls)
1930	Langwith Welfare		
1931–1932	Bolsover Colliery		
1932–1933	Shirebrook Miners Welfare		
1933–1934	Sheffield Wednesday	0	(0)
1934–195	Mansfield Town	4	(1)
1935	Sutton Town		
1936	Stewarts & Lloyds		
- * Club domestic league appearances and goals

Sidney Hawley (25 January 1909 – 1971) was an English professional footballer who played in the Football League for Mansfield Town.
