= Ted Harston =

English footballer

Personal information
- Full name: Edwin Harston
- Date of birth: 10 April 1907
- Place of birth: Monk Bretton, England
- Date of death: 1971 (aged 63–64)
- Place of death: Rochester, England
- Height: 5 ft 7 in (1.70 m)
- Position: Centre-forward

Senior career*
Years	Team	Apps	(Gls)
1928–1930	Sheffield Wednesday	0	(0)
1930–1931	Barnsley	12	(4)
1931–1934	Reading	18	(11)
1934–1935	Bristol City	28	(17)
1935–1937	Mansfield Town	70	(81)
1937–1939	Liverpool	5	(3)
Total		133	(116)
- * Club domestic league appearances and goals

Edwin Harston (10 April, 1907 – 1971 (27.5.71) was an English footballer who played in The Football League for six different clubs and notably scored 55 league goals in a single season for Mansfield Town.

A native of Monk Bretton near Barnsley, Harston began his professional career at Sheffield Wednesday, whom he joined in 1928 from amateur team Cudworth Village. He remained a reserve on Wednesday, and he joined Barnsley in May 1930. He then spent three years at Reading, where he despite an excellent goalscoring record only played sporadically.

In 1934, he joined Bristol City where he spent just over one season, before Mansfield Town paid £250 for his services in October 1935. He made his debut for the Stags against Southport on 19 October 1935 and scored a hat-trick on his debut. In his first season with Mansfield, he scored 26 goals in 29 league games and scored once in the FA Cup, easily topping the club's goalscoring chart.

The following season, he was even more prolific, scoring 55 goals in 41 league games and finished top scorer in Division Three North, also scoring three goals in two FA Cup games. In all, he scored three or more goals eight times during the 1936–37 season, including an astonishing seven goals in Mansfield's 8–2 win against Hartlepools United on 23 January 1937.

In the summer of 1937, Harston moved to Liverpool for a £3,000 transfer fee. He scored three goals in five games for the Reds but then suffered a broken leg which effectively ended his career.

His wife Irene May died in 1956 and Ted died in 1971, in Rochester, Kent. He had three daughters Patricia, Linda and Sandra.
