= George Bytheway =

English footballer

Personal information
- Full name: George Bytheway
- Date of birth: 27 March 1908
- Place of birth: Chesterfield, England
- Date of death: 1979 (aged 70–71)
- Position: Winger

Senior career*
Years	Team	Apps	(Gls)
1926	Staveley Town		
1927–1931	West Bromwich Albion	16	(2)
1933–1934	Coventry City	7	(2)
1933–1936	Mansfield Town	87	(23)
1936	Guildford City		
- * Club domestic league appearances and goals

George Bytheway (27 March 1908 – 1979) was an English professional footballer who played in the Football League for Coventry City, Mansfield Town and West Bromwich Albion.
