= George Barlow (footballer, born 1914) =

English footballer

Personal information
- Full name: George Arthur Barlow
- Date of birth: 1914
- Place of birth: Langwith Junction, England
- Position: Full back

Senior career*
Years	Team	Apps	(Gls)
1933	Langwith Miners Welfare		
1934–1936	Mansfield Town	11	(0)
- * Club domestic league appearances and goals

George Arthur Barlow (1914–unknown) was an English professional footballer who played in the Football League for Mansfield Town.
