= Fred Field (footballer) =

English footballer

Personal information
- Full name: Frederick Stanley Field
- Date of birth: 12 June 1914
- Place of birth: Mansfield, England
- Date of death: 2004 (aged 89–90)
- Position: Centre forward

Senior career*
Years	Team	Apps	(Gls)
1932	Welbeck Colliery		
1933–1934	Bradford Park Avenue	1	(1)
1935–1936	Mansfield Town	2	(0)
1936	Sutton Town		
Total		3	(1)
- * Club domestic league appearances and goals

Frederick Stanley Field (12 June 1914 – 2004) was an English professional footballer who played in the Football League for Bradford Park Avenue and Mansfield Town.
