= Jack Moran =

English footballer

Personal information
- Full name: John Moran
- Date of birth: 9 February 1906
- Place of birth: Wigan, England
- Date of death: 12 October 1959 (aged 53)
- Place of death: Newton-le-Willows, England
- Height: 5 ft 10 in (1.78 m)
- Position: Outside left

Senior career*
Years	Team	Apps	(Gls)
	Earlestown	?	(?)
1925–1930	Wigan Borough	201	(0)
1931	Tottenham Hotspur	12	(0)
1932–1935	Watford	100	(0)
1935–1936	Mansfield Town	30	(0)
- * Club domestic league appearances and goals

John Moran (9 February 1906 – 12 October 1959) was an English professional footballer who played for Earlestown, Wigan Borough, Tottenham Hotspur, Watford and Mansfield Town.

== Football career ==
Born in Wigan, Moran joined Wigan Borough after playing for non League Earlestown. Between 1925 and 1930 the outside left played 201 matches for the Lancashire club. In 1931 he signed for Tottenham Hotspur where he featured in a further 12 matches before joining Watford in September, 1932 for a fee of £150. He went on to make 100 appearances for the Hertfordshire club. Moran signed for Mansfield Town in 1935 and played in 30 games before ending his playing career.

Moran died in Newton-le-Willows at the age of 53.
