= Alf Brown (footballer, born 1907) =

English footballer

Personal information
- Full name: Alfred Brown
- Date of birth: 22 February 1907
- Place of birth: Chadderton, England
- Date of death: 1994 (aged 86–87)
- Height: 5 ft 10 1/2 in (1.79 m)
- Position: Wing half

Senior career*
Years	Team	Apps	(Gls)
1926–1928	Chamber Colliery		
1928–1933	Oldham Athletic	44	(0)
1933–1935	Northampton Town	55	(1)
1935–1937	Mansfield Town	46	(0)
Total		145	(1)
- * Club domestic league appearances and goals

Alfred Brown (22 February 1907 – 1994) was an English professional footballer who played in the Football League for Mansfield Town, Northampton Town, Oldham Athletic.
