= Jimmy Hunter (Scottish footballer) =

Scottish footballer

Personal information
- Full name: James Boyd Hunter
- Date of birth: 12 July 1910
- Place of birth: Dunfermline, Scotland
- Date of death: 1976 (aged 71–72)
- Height: 5 ft 7 in (1.70 m)
- Position: Winger

Senior career*
Years	Team	Apps	(Gls)
1928–1929	Wheeldons United		
1929–1930	Stanton Ironworks		
1930–1934	Ilkeston United		
1934	Ripley Town		
1934–1935	Mansfield Town	26	(5)
1935–1939	Plymouth Argyle	95	(15)
1939	Preston North End	0	(0)
- * Club domestic league appearances and goals

James Boyd Hunter (12 July 1910 – 1976) was a Scottish professional footballer who played in the Football League for Mansfield Town and Plymouth Argyle.
