= William Grundy (footballer, born 1914) =

English footballer

Personal information
- Full name: William Grundy
- Date of birth: 1914
- Place of birth: Kirkby-in-Ashfield, England
- Position: Wing half

Senior career*
Years	Team	Apps	(Gls)
1933–1934	Annesley Colliery Welfare		
1934–1935	Coventry City	1	(0)
1935–1936	Mansfield Town	5	(0)
1936	Annesley Colliery Welfare		
Total		6	(0)
- * Club domestic league appearances and goals

William Grundy (1914 – after 1935) was an English professional footballer who played in the Football League for Coventry City and Mansfield Town.
