= Harry Gabbitas =

English footballer

Personal information
- Full name: Harold Gabbitas
- Date of birth: 1 April 1905
- Place of birth: Mansfield, England
- Date of death: 8 December 1954 (aged 49)
- Place of death: Mansfield, Nottinghamshire, England
- Position: Centre forward

Senior career*
Years	Team	Apps	(Gls)
1933–1934	Mansfield LMS		
1934–1935	Army (India)		
1935–1936	Mansfield Town	1	(0)
1936	Worksop Town		
Total		1	(0)
- * Club domestic league appearances and goals

Harold Gabbitas (1 April 1905 – 1954) was an English professional footballer who played in the Football League for Mansfield Town.

In the 1939 Register of Mansfield he is described as a Colliery Hewer. He died at Mansfield Colliery on 8 December 1954, aged 49.
