= Leonard Wood (footballer) =

English footballer

Personal information
- Full name: Leonard Wood
- Height: 5 ft 8 in (1.73 m)
- Position: Wing half

Senior career*
Years	Team	Apps	(Gls)
1934–1935	Huddersfield Town	0	(0)
1935–1938	Mansfield Town	46	(3)
1938–1939	Tunbridge Wells Rangers		
- Chelmsford City
Total		46	(3)
- * Club domestic league appearances and goals

Leonard Wood was a professional footballer who played in the Football League for Mansfield Town.

== Career ==
Wood began his career at Huddersfield Town, before signing for Mansfield Town in 1935. At Mansfield, Wood made 46 Football League appearances, scoring three times, before departing in 1938 for Tunbridge Wells Rangers. Wood's exploits at Tunbridge Wells, scoring over 30 goals for the club, led Chelmsford City to sign him in 1939.
