= Arthur Atkinson (footballer) =

English footballer (1909–1983)

Personal information
- Full name: George Arthur Atkinson
- Date of birth: 30 September 1909
- Place of birth: Goole, England
- Date of death: 1983 (aged 73–74)
- Height: 5 ft 9 in (1.75 m)
- Position: Inside forward

Senior career*
Years	Team	Apps	(Gls)
1928–1929	Goole LMS		
1929–1932	Goole Town		
1932–1933	Lincoln City	9	(5)
1933–1934	Hull City	5	(0)
1934–1937	Mansfield Town	120	(32)
1937–1938	Southport	37	(7)
1938	Thorne Colliery		
Total		171	(44)
- * Club domestic league appearances and goals

George Arthur Atkinson (30 September 1909 – 1983) was an English professional footballer who played in the Football League for Hull City, Lincoln City, Mansfield Town and Southport.
