= Clarence Hufton =

English footballer

Personal information
- Full name: Clarence Hufton
- Date of birth: 25 March 1912
- Place of birth: Sutton-in-Ashfield, England
- Date of death: 2002 (aged 89–90)
- Position: Wing half

Senior career*
Years	Team	Apps	(Gls)
1930	Shirebrook		
1931–1932	Bolsover Colliery		
1932–1933	Sutton Junction		
1933–1934	Langwith Wagon Works		
1934–1935	Mansfield Town	4	(0)
1935	Sutton Town		
- * Club domestic league appearances and goals

Clarence Hufton (25 March 1912 – 2002) was an English professional footballer who played in the Football League for Mansfield Town.
