= Ted Dransfield =

English footballer

Personal information
- Full name: Edward Dransfield
- Date of birth: 28 November 1906
- Place of birth: Chapeltown, England
- Date of death: 1986 (aged 79–80)
- Height: 5 ft 9 in (1.75 m)
- Position: Full back

Senior career*
Years	Team	Apps	(Gls)
1926	High Green Swifts		
1927–1930	Rotherham United	31	(0)
1930–1931	Birmingham	0	(0)
1931–1933	Swindon Town	64	(3)
1933–1934	Southampton	0	(0)
1934–1937	Mansfield Town	78	(1)
1937	Bath City		
- * Club domestic league appearances and goals

Edward Dransfield (28 November 1906 – 1986) was an English professional footballer who played in the Football League for Mansfield Town, Rotherham United and Swindon Town.
