= Ernest Wright (footballer) =

English footballer

Personal information
- Full name: Ernest William Wright
- Date of birth: 29 December 1907
- Place of birth: Sheffield, England
- Date of death: 1977 (aged 68–69)
- Height: 6 ft 0 in (1.83 m)
- Position: Central defender

Senior career*
Years	Team	Apps	(Gls)
1932–1933	Huddersfield Town	0	(0)
1933–1934	Bradford City	0	(0)
1934–1937	Mansfield Town	47	(0)
1937	Boston United		
- * Club domestic league appearances and goals

Ernest William Wright (29 December 1907 – 1977) was an English professional footballer who played in the Football League for Mansfield Town.
