= Charlie Bell (footballer, born 1894) =

Scottish footballer and manager

Personal information
- Full name: Charles Oliver Bell
- Date of birth: 18 May 1894
- Place of birth: Dumfries, Scotland
- Date of death: 5 June 1939 (aged 45)
- Place of death: Bournemouth, England
- Position: Centre forward

Youth career
- Dumfries Wanderers
- Douglas Wanderers

Senior career*
Years	Team	Apps	(Gls)
19XX–1913	Carlisle City		
1913–1914	Woolwich Arsenal	1	(2)
1914–1915	Chesterfield	11	(7)
- Barrow
1921–1922	Queens Park Rangers	0	(0)

Managerial career
- 1919–1922: Sporting CP
- 1923–1925: Wigan Borough
- 1927–1928: Padova
- 1928–1930: Sporting CP
- 1932–1933: Marseille
- 1933: Nice
- 1935: Mansfield Town
- 1936–1939: Bournemouth
- * Club domestic league appearances and goals

Charles Oliver Bell (18 May 1894 – 5 June 1939) was a footballer and manager.

== Birth ==
There is some uncertainty over the details of Charlie Bell's birth. Some sources report him as being born in Dumfries in Scotland, although RSSSF states that he was born in Cambridge in England.

== Playing career ==
Charlie started his footballing career as a junior with Dumfries Wanderers and after a short spell at Castle Douglas side, Douglas Wanderers, he decided to move down south, signing for Carlisle City. Charlie then played for other clubs south of the border, namely Woolwich Arsenal, Chesterfield, Barrow and Queens Park Rangers in a career impacted by World War I.

== Coaching and management ==
After coaching jobs at Sporting Clube de Portugal, Reading and Notts County, he became a full-time manager at Wigan Borough. Charlie left England for Italy, where he coached Padova from 1927 to 1928. He came back to Lisbon with Sporting Clube de Portugal in 1928. In 1932, Charlie was the first Marseille manager in the newly founded French professional football championship. In France, he had also a stint at Nice.

Charlie came back to England in 1935, with Mansfield Town and then managed Bournemouth for three years.

== Honours ==
Sporting CP

- Lisbon Championship: 1921–22

Marseille

- Ligue 1 runners-up: 1932–33 (Group A)

== Death ==
He died soon after, aged 45 in Bournemouth.
