= AFC Bournemouth =

Association football club in Bournemouth, England

- Full name: AFC Bournemouth (Note: The full name of the club is AFC Bournemouth, without expansion. The AFC prefix is not an abbreviation, but was included in the full name as letters to ensure that AFC Bournemouth would appear before Arsenal and Aston Villa in alphabetical lists. The letters are a reference to (but not an abbreviation of) the club's previous name of Bournemouth and Boscombe Athletic Football Club. AFC is nevertheless occasionally, incorrectly, expanded to Athletic Football Club or Association Football Club by third parties.)
- Nicknames: The Cherries; Boscombe
- Founded: 1899; 127 years ago (as Boscombe)
- Ground: Dean Court
- Capacity: 12,357
- Owner: Black Knight Football Club UK Limited (Note: Black Knight Football Club UK Limited is a wholly-owned subsidiary of Foley Entertainment Group.)
- Chairman: Bill Foley
- Head coach: Marco Rose
- League: Premier League
- 2025–26: Premier League, 6th of 20
- Website: afcb.co.uk
Home colours	Away colours	Third colours

AFC Bournemouth (/ˈbɔːrnməθ/ BORN-məth) is a professional football club based in Kings Park, Boscombe, a suburb of Bournemouth, Dorset, England. The club competes in the Premier League, the top tier of English football. Formed in 1899 as Boscombe, the club adopted their current name in 1971. Nicknamed "The Cherries", and commonly referred to as Bournemouth, they have played their home games at Dean Court since 1910.

The club competed in regional football leagues before going up from the Hampshire League to the Southern League in 1920. By then, known as Bournemouth & Boscombe Athletic, they were elected into the Football League in 1923. They remained in the Third Division South for 35 years, winning the Third Division South Cup in 1946. Placed in the newly reorganised Third Division in 1958, they suffered relegation in 1970, but would win an immediate promotion in 1970–71. Relegated back into the Fourth Division in 1975, Bournemouth were promoted again in 1981–82 and after lifting the Associate Members' Cup in 1984 would go on to win the Third Division title in 1986–87. They spent three seasons in the second tier but entered administration in 1997 and ended up back in the fourth tier with relegation in 2002, though immediately gained promotion by winning the play-offs in 2003.

Bournemouth entered administration for a second time and were relegated back into League Two in 2008, but ended the year by appointing Eddie Howe as manager. Under Howe's stewardship, Bournemouth won three promotions in six years to win a place in the first tier of English football for the first time in their history. This was achieved with a second-place finish in League Two in 2009–10, a second-place finish in League One in 2012–13 and a Championship title in 2014–15. The club remained in the Premier League for five seasons before suffering relegation in 2020, but they returned in 2022 as Championship runners-up, this time under the management of Scott Parker. Following their return to the top flight, the club achieved their highest league finish to date, by finishing 6th in 2025–26, thus earning European football and qualifying for the UEFA Europa League for the first time in their history, under the management of Andoni Iraola.

== History ==
=== Boscombe ===
Although the exact date of the club's foundation is not known, there is proof that it was formed in the autumn of 1899 out of the remains of the older Boscombe St. John's Institute Football Club. The club was originally known as Boscombe Football Club. The first president was Mr. J. C. Nutt.

In their first season, 1899–1900, Boscombe competed in the Bournemouth and District Junior League. They also played in the Hants Junior Cup. During the first two seasons, they played on a football pitch in Castlemain Avenue, Pokesdown. From their third season, the team played on a pitch in King's Park. In the 1905–06 season, Boscombe graduated to senior amateur football.

In 1910, the club was granted a long lease over some wasteland next to Kings Park as the club's football ground by local businessman J.E. Cooper-Dean. With their own ground, named Dean Court after the benefactor, the club continued to thrive, and dominated the local football scene. The same year the club signed its first professional player Baven Penton.

Around about this time, the club obtained their nickname "The Cherries". There are two leading explanations of how the club gained the nickname: from the cherry-red striped shirts that the team played in, and, perhaps less plausible, because Dean Court was built adjacent to the Cooper-Dean estate, which, it is believed, may have contained many cherry trees.

For the first time, during the 1913–14 season, the club competed in the FA Cup. The club's progress, however, was halted in 1914 with the outbreak of World War I, and Boscombe returned to the Hampshire League.

In 1920, the Third Division of the Football League was formed, and Boscombe were promoted to the Southern League, finding moderate success.

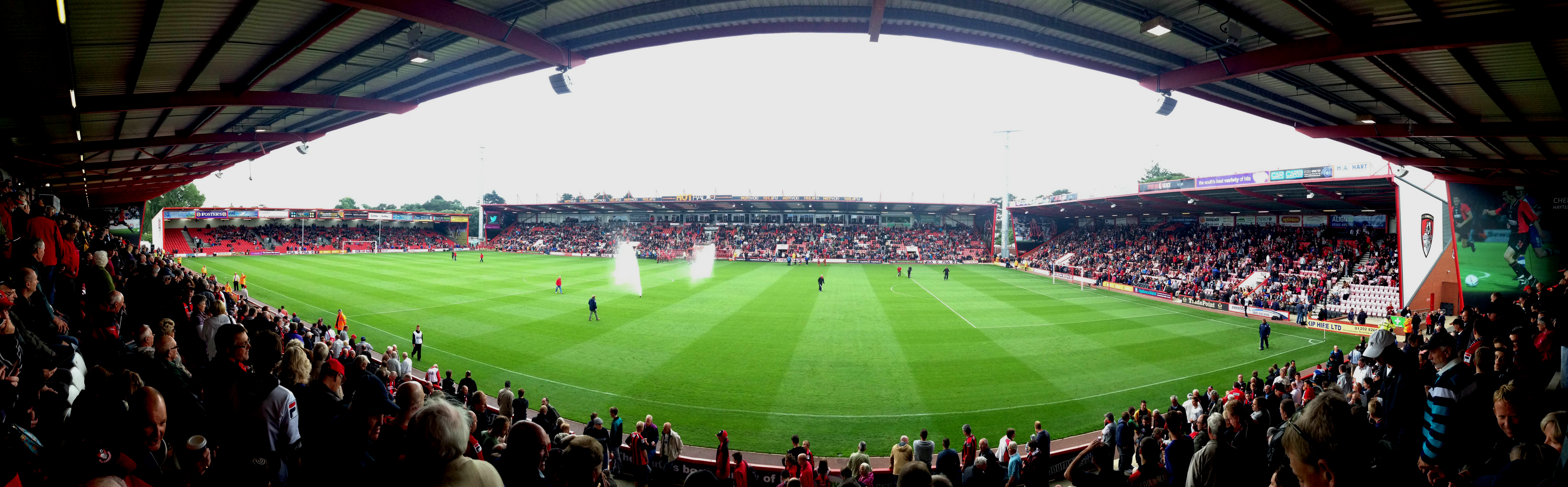
Dean Court

=== Bournemouth & Boscombe Athletic ===
To make the club more representative of the district, the name was changed to Bournemouth & Boscombe Athletic Football Club in 1923. During the same year, the club was elected to the newly expanded Third Division South. The first league match was at Swindon Town on 25 August 1923, which Bournemouth lost 3–1. The first league game at Dean Court was also against Swindon, where Bournemouth gained their first league point after a 0–0 draw.

Bournemouth struggled in the Football League but eventually established themselves as a Third Division club. Bournemouth remains on the records as the longest continuous members of the Third Division.

As a league club, Bournemouth had to wait until after the Second World War before winning their first trophy. This was accomplished as they beat Walsall in the Third Division (South) Cup in the final at Stamford Bridge.

=== AFC Bournemouth ===
The club adopted the name AFC Bournemouth for the start of the 1971–72 season, with the intention that the club would appear first in alphabetical lists of English clubs whilst also keeping the initialism of AFC (Athletic Football Club) as part of their name. A year later, the club adopted a new badge as a symbol of its progress. The stripes in the background were based on the club shirt, while in the foreground is the profile of a player heading the ball, in honour of Dickie Dowsett, a prolific scorer for the club in the 1950s and 1960s.

The team's red-and-black kit, introduced in 1971, was based on the AC Milan strip. This was the era of Ted MacDougall, a prolific goalscorer who, in an FA Cup tie in November 1971, scored nine goals in an 11–0 win against Margate.

=== Late 20th century ===
Chart of yearly table positions of Bournemouth in the League.

Bournemouth recorded a famous victory over holders Manchester United in the FA Cup in January 1984, while they were managed by Harry Redknapp. The club won its second piece of silverware by winning the Associate Members' Cup in its inaugural season, beating Hull City 2–1 at Boothferry Park on 24 May 1984 in the final.

Redknapp took Bournemouth into the second tier of the English league for the first time in their history as Third Division champions in 1987. After comfortably surviving in their first season in the Second Division, Bournemouth made a serious challenge for promotion to the top flight in the 1988–89 season; they ultimately fell away after a poor run late in the season, but their eventual finish of 12th place remained their highest-ever in the Football League until the 2013–14 season.

On 5 May 1990, the final day of the 1989–90 season, Leeds United had the chance to win the Second Division and gain promotion into the First Division by beating Bournemouth at Dean Court. Some United fans had already caused trouble in the town during the morning and the atmosphere was tense as Leeds won the match by a single goal. Combined with the results of other matches, this meant that Leeds were promoted while Bournemouth were relegated. The violence and destruction by visitors to Bournemouth continued over the holiday weekend, causing more than £1 million worth of damage and injury to opposing fans and police officers. The town's Daily Echo newspaper reported that "spectators, including many young children, had to run to safety as missiles were hurled and riot police waded in to control the crowds." The matter was raised in Parliament by one of the town's MPs. Financially, the Leeds trouble affected the club for more than a decade, as Bournemouth were prevented by local police from staging home games on Bank Holidays (traditionally a popular day for football) until a game against Shrewsbury Town on 21 April 2003.

Redknapp remained at the club for two more seasons, both of which ended with the club falling three points short of the play-offs. However, mounting financial pressures caused him to resign his position at the end of the 1991–92 season, and he subsequently re-joined former club West Ham United as a coach. He was replaced by Tony Pulis, who built a much cheaper squad that could only manage two consecutive 17th-place finishes before Pulis walked out of the club, blaming financial pressures.

Bournemouth went the first few months of the 1994–95 season without a permanent manager in place, and a dreadful start saw them bottom of the table for much of the first half of the season. Despite a minor upturn in form when Mel Machin was appointed as manager, they looked highly unlikely to survive, given that there were five relegation spots in Division Two for that season due to league reconstruction. However, a late run of form combined with collapses by relegation rivals Cambridge United and Plymouth Argyle saw them survive on the last day of the season by two points.

Machin ultimately remained in charge for six years, most of which were marked by unremarkable mid-table finishes. The 1998–99 season proved to be arguably the highlight of his tenure, with the club making a serious playoff challenge for most of the season, but ultimately falling short and finishing seventh. However, a drop to 16th place in the 1999–2000 season followed by a poor start to the following season saw Machin removed from his position and given the role of director of football.

=== Early 21st century ===
Sean O'Driscoll was promoted from the coaching staff in place of Mel Machin at the start of the 2000–01 season. In O'Driscoll's first season as manager, Bournemouth narrowly missed out on the Division Two playoffs but were relegated a year later in the new stadium (in the early part of the 2001–02 season, they played their home matches at Dorchester Town's ground while their own stadium was being redeveloped). The board kept faith in O'Driscoll and they were rewarded with promotion via the Division Three playoffs in 2002–03. The club became the first to score five goals at the Millennium Stadium when they beat Lincoln City 5–2 in the 2002–03 Division Three play-off final with goals from Steve Fletcher, Carl Fletcher (2), Stephen Purches and Garreth O'Connor. Under O'Driscoll, Bournemouth narrowly missed out on the play-offs for the 2003–04 and 2004–05 seasons, and just avoided relegation in the 2005–06 season.

Long-serving player James Hayter scored the fastest league hat-trick in English Football League history during the 2003–04 season. The Cherries were leading 3–0 against Wrexham thanks to goals from Stephen Purches, Warren Cummings and Warren Feeney when Hayter was brought onto the field as a substitute. With 86 minutes gone, Hayter managed to net three goals in the space of two minutes and 21 seconds, making the final score 6–0 to Bournemouth.

In September 2006, with the team in eighth in the League, Sean O'Driscoll left to become manager of Doncaster Rovers. He was replaced by Kevin Bond.

=== Decline and administration (2008–2009) ===
In February 2008, Bournemouth were forced into administration, suffering a ten-point deduction which put them in relegation trouble. Bournemouth had debts of around £4 million and almost went out of business. The off-field uncertainty continued throughout the season, with only one, ultimately unsuccessful, bid for the club accepted, and the club ended the season being relegated to League Two.

Ahead of the 2008–09 season, the team's future in the Football League was put into doubt when the league threatened to block Bournemouth's participation in League Two, due to problems with the club's continuing administration and change in ownership. The league ordered both Bournemouth and Rotherham United to demonstrate that they could fulfil all of their fixtures and find a way out of administration, eventually allowing the club to compete with a 17-point penalty for failing to follow the Football League insolvency rules. The new company was also ordered to pay unsecured creditors the amount offered at the time of the original CVA (around ten pence in the pound) within two years.

Early into the season, manager Bond was sacked and was replaced by former player Jimmy Quinn, who would himself leave the club only a few months later. Former player Eddie Howe took over as manager with the club still ten points adrift at the bottom of the league and initially on a caretaker basis, becoming the youngest manager in the Football League at the age of 31.

At the end of 2008, it was announced that local businessman Adam Murray had completed the purchase of 50% of the club's shares from previous chairman, Paul Baker. However, in January 2009, Murray missed the deadline to buy Baker's shares.

In the final home game of the 2008–09 season, the Cherries guaranteed their Football League status by beating Grimsby Town 2–1 with a winning goal ten minutes from time by Bournemouth's Steve Fletcher, sparking celebrations after an ending to "The Great Escape." They finished their season with a 4–0 victory at Morecambe.

In June 2009, a consortium including Adam Murray finally took over Bournemouth. The consortium included Jeff Mostyn, former vice-chairman Steve Sly, Neill Blake and former Dorchester Town chairman Eddie Mitchell.

=== Rise to the Premier League (2009–2015) ===
Howe's first full season in charge brought success as Bournemouth finished second in League Two to earn promotion with two games to spare. Howe left the club for Burnley during the following season; his successor, another former Bournemouth player, Lee Bradbury, led Bournemouth to the League One play-offs. The two-legged semi-final against Huddersfield Town finished 3–3 after extra time, and Huddersfield went through the final by winning the penalty shoot-out 4–2. Bradbury was unable to lead Bournemouth to another promotion challenge in the 2011–12 Football League One, placing 11th after a season of indifferent results, and was replaced by youth team coach Paul Groves for the final games of the season.

Groves remained in charge at the start of the 2012–13 season, only to be sacked in October 2012 following a start which left the club near the bottom of the table. Eddie Howe returned as manager, and not only did he pull the club away from their early-season relegation battle, they achieved promotion to the Championship, returning to the second-tier of English football for the first time since 1990. The club also revealed a new club crest. After a promising start to life in the Championship, the club was handed a fourth Round FA Cup tie with Premier League club Liverpool which ended in a 2–0 loss. Bournemouth finished their first season back in the Championship in tenth place, their highest ever position in the Football League.

On 25 October 2014, Bournemouth won 8–0 away at St. Andrew's against Birmingham City. It was the first time that the Cherries had ever scored eight goals in a league game and their largest winning margin in the league (not counting a 10–0 win over Northampton Town in September 1939, which was discounted after the league was abandoned due to the Second World War). The club followed up this success with a 2–1 victory over Premier League side West Bromwich Albion in the League Cup, reaching the quarter-finals of the competition for the first time. Bournemouth were again drawn against Liverpool but lost 3–1. The club spent most of the 2014–15 season near the top of the table, and a 3–0 win away at Charlton Athletic on the final day of the season was enough to clinch the Championship title and a first-ever promotion to the top flight of English football.

=== First Premier League era (2015–2020) ===
In Bournemouth's first season in the Premier League, the team was beset by a number of crippling injuries, including to Callum Wilson, star striker from the previous season. The team struggled for most of the first half of the season but an upturn in form during the second half of the season saw a reversal of fortunes. Bournemouth eventually finished 16th in the league, avoiding relegation.

The club was widely tipped to suffer second season syndrome, but the 2016–17 season was largely successful. Despite a weak start, which saw them in the relegation zone for the first three weeks, the team quickly recovered and went on to finish 9th. Star loan player Nathan Aké was signed permanently from Chelsea for a club-record fee in June 2017, reportedly in the region of £20 million. Despite another slow start in 2017–18, a run of good form through late December and January saw them steer clear of the relegation zone, and earn Howe his second Premier League Manager of the Month award. Bournemouth went on to gain 19 points from losing positions in the second half of the season – a Premier League record – helping the team finish in 12th place.

The 2018–19 season saw the club break their transfer record again on Jefferson Lerma during the summer, and contrasting with the previous season, the club had a strong start, sitting in 6th place after the first 12 games. However, their form regressed for the remainder of the season due to many injury problems. In the end, Bournemouth finished in 14th place, securing a 5th season in the Premier League.

A bright start to the 2019–20 season saw the team sitting in 7th place at the beginning of November. However, continuing injury problems and a poor run of results followed, and the club dropped into the relegation zone in January. Poor performances continued after the COVID-19 pandemic had interrupted the season, with key losses to Manchester City and Southampton putting the club on the brink. Despite a 3–1 victory over Everton away at Goodison Park on the final day, the club's relegation was confirmed because Aston Villa drew against West Ham. On 1 August 2020, Howe left the club by mutual consent, ending his 8-year second spell as manager.

==== Financial Fair Play violation and punishment ====
In 2016, Bournemouth were found guilty of violating the Football League's Financial Fair Play regulations during 2014–15, the season it secured promotion to the Premier League. The club's over-spend broke the 'maximum deviation', with a £38.3 million financial loss in 2014–15. This followed a loss of £10.3 million in 2013–2014. The club was originally fined £7.6 million by the Football League, but subsequently negotiated a settlement with a fine of £4.75 million for breaching Financial Fair Play rules.

=== Back to EFL Championship (2020–2022) ===
On 8 August, Jason Tindall, a former Bournemouth player and Howe's longtime assistant, was promoted to manager. Despite sitting second in mid-December, Tindall was sacked on 3 February 2021 after a run with one win in eight games, which saw the team fall to 6th in the table. He was replaced by first team coach Jonathan Woodgate, initially as caretaker. Woodgate remained as manager for the remainder of the season, as the club finished in 6th and entered the playoffs, but lost 3–2 to Brentford on aggregate in the semi-final. Woodgate's contract was not renewed after the season and on 28 June 2021, former Fulham manager Scott Parker was appointed as the new head coach, with Matt Wells as the assistant coach. Parker led the club on an impressive 15-game unbeaten start to the 2021–22 Championship season, going on to clinch promotion in the penultimate match of the season, a 1–0 victory against promotion rivals Nottingham Forest, amassing 88 points.

=== Second Premier League era, new ownership and European football (2022–present) ===
The club's return to the Premier League got off to a tough start. A breakdown in the club's relationship with Parker and a Premier League record-equalling 9–0 defeat to Liverpool at Anfield resulted in Parker's dismissal after just four league games on 30 August 2022. First team coach Gary O'Neil was made interim head coach and presided over an upturn in form in his 12 games in interim charge before being appointed as the permanent head coach on 27 November 2022.

On 13 December 2022, the club was purchased from previous owner Maxim Demin by Black Knight Football Club, a partnership led by American businessman Bill Foley and Cannae Holdings. The minority ownership group is led by Hollywood actor Michael B. Jordan and Kosmos founder Nullah Sarker. On 19 June 2023, the club announced the departure of manager O'Neil, with Andoni Iraola coming in to replace him. In the 2023–24 season, Bournemouth, led by Iraola, achieved their best points tally in the Premier League, accumulating 48 points to finish 12th. The following season, in the 2024–25 season, Bournemouth once again broke their record Premier League points total, achieving 56 points, whilst equalling their best ever league finish of 9th in the Premier League. As well as this, the club achieved their most wins in a Premier League season (15), fewest defeats (12), most goals scored (58), and fewest goals conceded (46).

On 19 May 2026, Bournemouth qualified for European football for the first time in their history, after their 1–1 draw with Manchester City. On 24 May 2026, they drew 1–1 with Nottingham Forest to confirm sixth place, the highest league finish in the club's history, which, after Manchester City lost to Aston Villa preventing the EPS from dropping down, meant Bournemouth qualified for the 2026–27 UEFA Europa League. With 57 points, the club also broke their Premier League points total for the third season running, whilst also only losing seven games, their fewest defeats in a Premier League season. This game was also the club's eighteenth draw of the season, breaking the record for the most draws in a thirty-eight game Premier League season, and extended the club's record unbeaten run to eighteen games, having not lost in the league since a 3–2 loss at home to Arsenal on 3 January 2026.

In the 2026–27 UEFA Europa League campaign, the Cherries defeated Real Sociedad 2–1 away on 17 September followed by a 3–0 home victory against Sturm Graz on 15 October in the club's first ever match and home match respectively. With a third win, 3–0 hosting AC Milan on 22 October, the club became the first in 53 years to win their first three matches in European competition. Three days later on 25 October, they set a further record in the 2026–27 Premier League with a 3–0 victory away at Manchester United, becoming the first team to score three or more goals in four consecutive visits to Old Trafford, having won by the same scoreline in the 2023–24 season and 2024–25 season, and scoring four in a 4–4 draw in the 2025–26 season.

== European record ==
=== Record by competition ===
Competition	Pld	W	D	L	GF	GA	GD	Best performance
UEFA Europa League	4	4	0	0	11	2	+9	TBD

Season	Competition	Round	Opposition	Home	Attendance	Away	Attendance	Aggregate
2026–27	UEFA Europa League	League phase	(Spain) Real Sociedad	—N/a	—N/a	2–1	30,020	
2026–27	UEFA Europa League	League phase	(Austria) Sturm Graz	3–0	12,070	—N/a	—N/a	
2026–27	UEFA Europa League	League phase	(Italy) Milan	3–0	12,130	—N/a	—N/a	
2026–27	UEFA Europa League	League phase	(Czech Republic) Sparta Prague	—N/a	—N/a	3–1	17,377	
2026–27	UEFA Europa League	League phase	(Spain) Celta Vigo	—N/a	—N/a			
2026–27	UEFA Europa League	League phase	(Czech Republic) Viktoria Plzeň			—N/a	—N/a	
2026–27	UEFA Europa League	League phase	(Norway) Lillestrøm	—N/a	—N/a			
2026–27	UEFA Europa League	League phase	(Israel) Hapoel Be'er Sheva			—N/a	—N/a	

== Players ==
=== Current squad ===
As of 8 September 2026

Note: Flags indicate national team as defined under FIFA eligibility rules; some limited exceptions apply. Players may hold more than one non-FIFA nationality.

No.	Pos.	Nation	Player
1	GK	SRB	Đorđe Petrović
2	DF	MEX	Julián Araujo
3	DF	FRA	Adrien Truffert
4	MF	ENG	Lewis Cook (vice-captain)
5	DF	ENG	James Hill
6	DF	ARG	Julio Soler
7	MF	WAL	David Brooks (3rd captain)
8	MF	ENG	Alex Scott
9	FW	BRA	Evanilson
10	MF	SCO	Ryan Christie (4th captain)
11	FW	SCO	Ben Gannon-Doak
12	MF	USA	Tyler Adams
14	DF	POR	António Silva
15	DF	ENG	Adam Smith (captain)

No.	Pos.	Nation	Player
16	MF	ENG	Marcus Tavernier
17	GK	ENG	Fraser Forster
18	DF	FRA	Bafodé Diakité
19	FW	NED	Justin Kluivert
20	GK	ITA	Michele Di Gregorio (on loan from Juventus)
21	MF	MAR	Amine Adli
22	FW	FRA	Eli Junior Kroupi
24	DF	ESP	Juanlu Sánchez
27	MF	HUN	Alex Tóth
28	DF	ENG	Max Aarons
29	FW	CAN	Daniel Jebbison
30	FW	URU	Álvaro Rodríguez
37	FW	BRA	Rayan
44	DF	SRB	Veljko Milosavljević

==== Out on loan ====
Note: Flags indicate national team as defined under FIFA eligibility rules; some limited exceptions apply. Players may hold more than one non-FIFA nationality.

No.	Pos.	Nation	Player
—	GK	NZL	Alex Paulsen (at Motherwell until 30 June 2027)
—	DF	ESP	Álex Jiménez (at Fiorentina until 30 June 2027)
—	MF	FRA	Romain Faivre (at Auxerre until 30 June 2027)

== Club officials ==
Board
Owner
(United States) Black Knight Football Club
Chairman	President of Football Operations	Technical Director	President of Business
(United States) Bill Foley	(Portugal) Tiago Pinto	(Scotland) Matt Ritchie	(United States) Jim Frevola
First Team
Management
Head Coach
(Germany) Marco Rose
Assistant Head Coach	Assistant Coach	First Team Coach	Technical Coach
(Germany) Marco Kurth	(Germany) Frank Geideck	(Austria) Patrick Eibenberger	(Germany) Fabian Friedrich
First Team Set Piece Coach	Head of Goalkeeping	First Team Goalkeeper Coach	First Team Assistant Goalkeeper Coach
(Canada) Nicolas Gagnon	(England) Neil Moss	(Belgium) Frederic De Boever	(England) Charlie Philpott
Medical
Performance Director	Head of Therapy	Physiotherapists	
(Germany) Robert Percy Marshall	(England) Scot McAllister	(England) Michael Harding	(England) Joe Barton
(England) Dave Gardner	(England) Natasha Nolan		
Sports Scientists
Lead Rehabilitation & Performance Specialist	Sports Scientists		
(England) Charlie Moore	(Northern Ireland) Sean McCullagh	(England) Rob Lloyd	
Analysis & Performance
First Team Senior Performance Analyst	Analysts		
(England) Ryan Dawes	(England) Sam May	(England) Luke Summers	

Position	Name
Academy Manager	(England) Sam Gisborne
Academy Head of Goalkeeping	(England) Billy Granger
Development Squad Manager	(England) Alan Connell
U18 Coach	(England) James Lowy

=== Former Officials ===
- Eddie Mitchell (owner from 2009 to 2013)
- Maxim Demin (owner from 2011 to 2022)

== Managers ==
- (England) Vincent Kitcher (1914–1923)
- (England) Harry Kinghorn (1923–1925, 1939–1947)
- (England) Leslie Knighton (1925–1928)
- (England) Frank Richards (1928–1930)
- (Scotland) Billy Birrell (1930–1935)
- (England) Bob Crompton (1935–1936)
- (England) Charlie Bell (1936–1939)
- (Scotland) Harry Lowe (1947–1950)
- (England) Jack Bruton (1950–1956)
- (England) Freddie Cox (1956–1958, 1965–1970)
- (England) Don Welsh (1958–1961)
- (England) Bill McGarry (1961–1963)
- (England) Reg Flewin (1963–1965)
- (England) John Bond (1970–1973)
- (England) Trevor Hartley (1974–1975)
- (England) Tony Nelson (2–23 January 1975)
- (Scotland) John Benson (23 January 1975 – 1978)
- (England) Alec Stock (1979–1980)
- (England) David Webb (1980–1982)
- (England) Don Megson (March–October 1983)
- (England) Harry Redknapp (October 1983 – 1992)
- (Wales) Tony Pulis (1992 – August 1994)
- (England) John Williams (August–September 1994)
- (England) Mel Machin (1 September 1994 – 18 August 2000)
- (Republic of Ireland) Sean O'Driscoll (19 August 2000 – 8 September 2006)
- (England) Stuart Murdoch and
  (England) Joe Roach (jointly, 10 September 2006 – 13 October 2006)
- (England) Kevin Bond (13 October 2006 – 1 September 2008)
- (Northern Ireland) Jimmy Quinn (2 September 2008 – 31 December 2008)
- (England) Eddie Howe (31 December 2008 – 16 January 2011, 12 October 2012 – 1 August 2020)
- (England) Lee Bradbury (16 January 2011 – 25 March 2012)
- (England) Paul Groves (25 March 2012 – 3 October 2012)
- (England) Jason Tindall (8 August 2020 – 3 February 2021)
- (England) Jonathan Woodgate (3 February 2021 – 28 June 2021)
- (England) Scott Parker (28 June 2021 – 30 August 2022)
- (England) Gary O'Neil (30 August 2022 – 19 June 2023)
- (Spain) Andoni Iraola (19 June 2023 – 24 May 2026)
- (Germany) Marco Rose (1 June 2026 – )

== Colours ==
The team's colours have varied slightly throughout the club's history. Starting off playing in red-and-white stripes, Bournemouth have also played in all-red shirts, red with white sleeves, and mostly, since 1990, in red-and-black stripes. A predominantly red shirt was chosen for the 2004–05 and 2005–06 seasons, but – due to fan demand – a return was made to the stripes for the 2006–07 season.

Since 2026 the team's kit has been manufactured by Hummel. Previously it has been made by Umbro (1974–78, 1983–86, 2017–26), Adidas (1978–81), Osca (1982–83), Henson (1986–87), Scoreline (1987–90), Ellgren (1990–92), Matchwinner (1993–95), Le Coq Sportif (1995–96), Patrick (1996–2000), Super League (2000–01), TFG Sportswear (2001–03), Bourne Red (2003–08), Carbrini Sportswear (2008–11, 2014–15), Fila (2011–14) and JD Sports (2015–17).

For the 2026–27 season, the team's shirts are sponsored by Vitality, with MrQ as the shirt sleeve sponsor. Before this, sponsors have been Reg Heynes Toyota (1980–82, 1983–85), Coopers Beers (1985–87), Canberra Homes (1987–88), Nolan (1988–89), A1 Windscreens (1990–92), Exchange & Mart (1992–94), Frizzell (1994–97), Seward (1997–2006), Focal Point (2006–08, 2011–12), Carbrini Sportswear (2008–11), Energy Consulting (2012–15), Mansion (2015–17), M88 (2017–20), Vitality (2020), MSP Capital (2020–22), Dafabet (2022–24) and bj88 (2024–26). The team's sleeve sponsors have previously been Mansion (2017–20), DeWalt (2022–24) and LEOS International (2024–26).

Year	Kit manufacturer	Shirt sponsor (front)	Shirt sponsor (sleeve)	Shirt sponsor (back)	Shorts sponsor
1974–1978	Umbro	No sponsor	No sponsor	No sponsor	No sponsor
1978–1980	Adidas	No sponsor	No sponsor	No sponsor	No sponsor
1980–1981	Adidas	Reg Heynes Toyota	No sponsor	No sponsor	No sponsor
1981–1982	In-House	Reg Heynes Toyota	No sponsor	No sponsor	No sponsor
1982–1983	Osca	No sponsor	No sponsor	No sponsor	No sponsor
1983–1985	Umbro	Reg Heynes Toyota	No sponsor	No sponsor	No sponsor
1985–1986	Umbro	Coopers Beers	No sponsor	No sponsor	No sponsor
1986–1987	Hensons	Coopers Beers	No sponsor	No sponsor	No sponsor
1987–1988	Scoreline	Canberra Homes	No sponsor	No sponsor	No sponsor
1988–1989	Scoreline	Nolan	No sponsor	No sponsor	No sponsor
1989–1990	Scoreline	No sponsor	No sponsor	No sponsor	No sponsor
1990–1992	Ellgren	A1 Windscreens	No sponsor	No sponsor	No sponsor
1992–1994	Matchwinner	Exchange & Mart	No sponsor	No sponsor	No sponsor
1994–1995	Matchwinner	Frizzell	No sponsor	No sponsor	No sponsor
1995–1996	Le Coq Sportif	Frizzell	No sponsor	No sponsor	No sponsor
1996–1997	Patrick	Frizzell	No sponsor	No sponsor	No sponsor
1997–2000	Patrick	Seward Cars	No sponsor	No sponsor	No sponsor
2000–2001	Super League	Seward Cars	No sponsor	No sponsor	No sponsor
2001–2003	TFG Sports	Seward Cars	No sponsor	No sponsor	No sponsor
2003–2006	Bourne Red	Seward Cars	No sponsor	No sponsor	No sponsor
2006–2008	Bourne Red	Focal Point Fires	No sponsor	No sponsor	No sponsor
2008–2011	Carbrini Sportswear	Carbrini Sportswear	No sponsor	JD Sports	JD Sports
2011–2012	Fila	Focal Point Fires	No sponsor	Focal Point Fires	No sponsor
2012–2014	Fila	Energy-Consulting	No sponsor	Energy-Consulting	No sponsor
2014–2015	Carbrini Sportswear	Energy-Consulting	No sponsor	Energy-Consulting	No sponsor
2015–2017	JD Sports	Mansion	No sponsor	No sponsor	No sponsor
2017–2019	Umbro	M88	Mansion	No sponsor	No sponsor
2019–2020	Umbro	M88 / Vitality (Note: Bournemouth's main shirt sponsor was M88 until 13 June 2020, when Vitality became the main sponsor for the rest of the season.)	Mansion	No sponsor	No sponsor
2020–2021	Umbro	MSP Capital	No sponsor	DWP Housing Partnership	United Pallet Network
2021–2022	Umbro	MSP Capital	No sponsor	QuinnBet	United Pallet Network
2022–2024	Umbro	Dafabet	DeWalt	No sponsor	No sponsor
2024–2025	Umbro	bj88	LEOS International	The Soccer Tournament (in FA Cup matches)	No sponsor
2025–2026	Umbro	bj88	LEOS International	No sponsor	No sponsor
2026–	Hummel	Vitality	MrQ	No sponsor	No sponsor

== Rivalries ==
According to a poll named 'The League of Love and Hate' in August 2019, Bournemouth supporters named their club's near neighbour Southampton as its biggest rival, with Portsmouth, Brighton and Hove Albion, Reading and Leeds United following.

The most intense rivalry is with Leeds United, due to an incident on 5 May 1990, where Leeds fans caused widespread disorder and damage in Bournemouth over the May Day bank holiday weekend.

== Records and statistics ==
Steve Fletcher holds the record for Bournemouth appearances, having played 726 first-team matches between 1992 and 2013. Fletcher also holds the record for most league appearances, making 628. Ron Eyre holds the record for the most goals 229 in a Bournemouth shirt having played 337 first-team matches between 1924 and 1933. Ted MacDougall holds the record for the most goals scored in a single season, 42 in the 1970–71 season in the Fourth Division.

The highest transfer fee received for a Bournemouth player to date is £65 million, from Tottenham Hotspur for Dominic Solanke in August 2024, whilst the highest transfer fee paid by the club to date is £40.2 million, for Evanilson from Porto, also in August 2024.

The club's highest league finish to date is 6th place in the Premier League, achieved in the 2025–26 season. Their best performance in the FA Cup is reaching the quarter-finals of the competition in the 1956–57, 2020–21 and 2024–25 seasons, whilst in the EFL Cup, Bournemouth's best performance is reaching the quarter-finals in the 2014–15, 2017–18 and 2018–19 seasons.

== Honours ==
League

- Championship (level 2)
  - Champions: 2014–15
  - Runners-up: 2021–22
- Third Division South / Third Division / League One (level 3)
  - Champions: 1986–87
  - Runners-up: 1947–48, 2012–13
- Fourth Division / Third Division / League Two (level 4)
  - Runners-up: 1970–71, 2009–10
  - Promoted: 1981–82
  - Play-off winners: 2003
- Southern League
  - Runners-up: 1922–23

Cup

- Associate Members' Cup / Football League Trophy
  - Winners: 1983–84
  - Runners-up: 1997–98
- Third Division South Cup
  - Winners: 1945–46

== See also ==
- AFC Bournemouth Women
