= 1937–38 Mansfield Town F.C. season =

Mansfield Town
1937–38 season
- Manager: Harry Parkes, Jack Poole
- Stadium: Field Mill
- Third Division South: 14th
- FA Cup: Third round
- Third Division South Cup: First Round
Home colours

The 1937–38 season was Mansfield Town's seventh season in the Football League and Second in the Third Division South, they finished in 14th position with 39 points.

== Final league table ==
Pos	Team	Pld	W	D	L	GF	GA	GAv	Pts
12	Southend United	42	15	10	17	70	68	1.029	40
13	Bournemouth & Boscombe Athletic	42	14	12	16	56	57	0.982	40
14	Mansfield Town	42	15	9	18	62	67	0.925	39
15	Bristol Rovers	42	13	13	16	46	61	0.754	39
16	Newport County	42	11	16	15	43	52	0.827	38

== Results ==
=== Football League Third Division South ===
Match	Date	Opponent	Venue	Result	Attendance	Scorers
1	28 August 1937	Northampton Town	H	4–1	9,619	Crawshaw (3), Holmes
2	4 September 1937	Bristol Rovers	A	0–0	7,996	
3	8 September 1937	Walsall	H	3–1	7,979	Crawshaw, Horne (2)
4	11 September 1937	Gillingham	H	3–1	7,921	Crawshaw (2), Speed
5	15 September 1937	Brighton & Hove Albion	A	0–2	6,294	
6	18 September 1937	Torquay United	H	1–1	7,393	Speed
7	25 September 1937	Clapton Orient	A	2–1	8,590	Crawshaw (2)
8	2 October 1937	Southend United	H	2–2	8,330	Crawshaw (2)
9	7 October 1937	Notts County	A	0–2	13,362	
10	9 October 1937	Queens Park Rangers	A	1–1	14,142	Crawshaw
11	16 October 1937	Exeter City	A	0–4	4,894	
12	23 October 1937	Swindon Town	H	2–0	5,264	Crawshaw, Sams
13	30 October 1937	Aldershot	A	0–1	5,680	
14	6 November 1937	Millwall	H	1–1	8,400	Horne
15	13 November 1937	Reading	A	2–3	7,910	Horne, Sams
16	20 November 1937	Crystal Palace	H	2–0	8,207	Crawshaw, Bungay
17	4 December 1937	Newport County	H	1–1	2,946	Holmes
18	18 December 1937	Watford	H	0–1	5,274	
19	25 December 1937	Cardiff City	H	3–0	12,114	Holmes (2), Crawshaw
20	26 December 1937	Cardiff City	A	1–4	37,726	Johnston
21	26 December 1937	Northampton Town	A	0–3	6,401	
22	15 January 1938	Bristol Rovers	H	1–0	3,222	Reed
23	22 January 1938	Gillingham	A	0–0	5,590	
24	29 January 1938	Torquay United	A	1–0	2,467	Reed
25	5 February 1938	Clapton Orient	H	3–1	5,394	Crawshaw (2), Reed
26	12 February 1938	Southend United	A	1–0	5,375	Speed
27	19 February 1938	Queens Park Rangers	H	3–2	9,072	Speed, Crawshaw, Turner
28	26 February 1938	Exeter City	H	2–3	7,187	Horne, Turner
29	5 March 1938	Swindon Town	A	3–3	7,728	Reed, Turner, Johnston
30	12 March 1938	Aldershot	H	2–0	7,173	Horne, Crawshaw
31	19 March 1938	Millwall	A	0–1	29,253	
32	26 March 1938	Reading	H	5–1	6,521	Crawshaw (4), Turner
33	2 April 1938	Crystal Palace	A	0–4	13,105	
34	9 April 1938	Notts County	H	1–2	11,190	Crawshaw
35	15 April 1938	Bournemouth & Boscombe Athletic	A	4–5	8,616	Crawshaw, Turner, Reed, Speed
36	16 April 1938	Newport County	A	0–1	8,087	
37	18 April 1938	Bournemouth & Boscombe Athletic	H	3–2	7,198	Crawshaw, Johnston, Reed
38	23 April 1938	Bristol City	H	3–5	7,233	Johnston, Reed (2)
39	27 April 1938	Bristol City	A	1–2	15,231	Reed
40	30 April 1938	Watford	A	0–2	9,222	
41	2 May 1938	Walsall	A	0–2	2,022	
42	7 May 1938	Brighton & Hove Albion	H	1–1	4,417	Shaw

=== FA Cup ===
Round	Date	Opponent	Venue	Result	Attendance	Scorers
R1	27 November 1937	Wellington Town	A	2–1	6,000	Crawshaw, Bungay
R2	15 December 1937	Lincoln City	H	2–1	8,062	Crawshaw, Holmes
R3	8 January 1938	Leicester City	H	1–2	15,890	Johnston

=== Football League Third Division South Cup ===
Round	Date	Opponent	Venue	Result	Attendance	Scorers
R1	27 September 1937	Crystal Palace	H	0–1	1,500	

== Squad statistics ==
- Squad list sourced from 1937–38 Mansfield Town F.C. season at the English National Football Archive (subscription required)

Pos.	Name	League		FA Cup		Third Division Cup		Total	
Pos.	Name	Apps	Goals	Apps	Goals	Apps	Goals	Apps	Goals
GK	(England) Daniel Black	3	0	0	0	1	0	4	0
GK	(Wales) John Hughes	39	0	3	0	0	0	42	0
DF	(England) Lloyd Barke	42	0	3	0	1	0	46	0
DF	(England) Reg Bungay	32	1	3	1	0	0	35	2
DF	(Scotland) William Patterson	40	0	3	0	1	0	44	0
DF	(England) Ted Vaux	3	0	0	0	0	0	3	0
DF	(England) George Stimpson	40	0	3	0	1	0	44	0
MF	(England) Austin Morris	1	0	0	0	0	0	1	0
MF	(England) Frank O'Connor	18	0	2	0	1	0	21	0
MF	(England) Fred Speed	39	5	3	0	1	0	43	5
MF	(England) Leonard Wood	4	0	0	0	0	0	4	0
FW	(England) Harold Crawshaw	41	25	3	2	1	0	45	27
FW	(England) Howitt Fielding	4	0	0	0	0	0	4	0
FW	(England) Maxey Holmes	17	4	2	1	0	0	19	5
FW	(England) Alf Horne	22	6	3	0	1	0	26	6
FW	(Scotland) Charlie Johnston	36	4	3	1	1	0	40	5
FW	(England) Chick Reed	22	9	0	0	0	0	22	9
FW	(England) George Rudkin	1	0	0	0	0	0	1	0
FW	(England) Alfie Sams	11	2	1	0	1	0	13	2
FW	(England) Fred Shaw	22	1	0	0	1	0	23	1
FW	(England) Jackie Stamps	1	0	0	0	0	0	1	0
FW	(England) John Turner	24	5	1	0	0	0	25	5
