= 1938–39 Mansfield Town F.C. season =

Mansfield Town
1938–39 season
- Manager: Jack Poole
- Stadium: Field Mill
- Third Division South: 16th
- FA Cup: Second round
- Third Division South Cup: Second Round
Home colours

The 1938–39 season was Mansfield Town's eighth season in the Football League and third in the Third Division South, they finished in 16th position with 39 points.

== Final league table ==
Pos	Team	Pld	W	D	L	GF	GA	GAv	Pts
14	Exeter City	42	13	14	15	65	82	0.793	40
15	Bournemouth & Boscombe Athletic	42	13	13	16	52	58	0.897	39
16	Mansfield Town	42	12	15	15	44	62	0.710	39
17	Northampton Town	42	15	8	19	51	58	0.879	38
18	Port Vale	42	14	9	19	52	58	0.897	37

== Results ==
=== Football League Third Division South ===
Match	Date	Opponent	Venue	Result	Attendance	Scorers
1	27 August 1938	Bristol Rovers	A	0–3	11,050	
2	31 August 1938	Cardiff City	H	2–2	6,959	Dutton (2)
3	3 September 1938	Brighton & Hove Albion	H	4–2	5,830	Dutton, Bungay (2), Carter
4	7 September 1938	Exeter City	A	0–2	6,297	
5	10 September 1938	Bournemouth & Boscombe Athletic	A	1–1	9,414	Dutton
6	17 September 1938	Walsall	H	0–0	5,918	
7	24 September 1938	Port Vale	A	0–3	8,100	
8	1 October 1938	Queens Park Rangers	A	0–3	12,519	
9	8 October 1938	Southend United	H	3–1	5,472	Dutton, Gardiner, Wilson
10	15 October 1938	Watford	H	0–0	6,491	
11	22 October 1938	Swindon Town	A	2–1	11,853	Wilson, Somerfield
12	29 October 1938	Bristol City	H	3–2	7,398	Dutton, Somerfield, Turner
13	5 November 1938	Aldershot	A	0–3	6,848	
14	12 November 1938	Notts County	H	2–0	9,852	Dutton, Turner
15	19 November 1938	Northampton Town	A	4–3	8,774	Dutton, Somerfield (3)
16	3 December 1938	Clapton Orient	A	0–0	8,204	
17	17 December 1938	Crystal Palace	A	2–6	10,244	Bell, Carter
18	24 December 1938	Bristol Rovers	H	1–3	3,343	Gardiner
19	26 December 1938	Ipswich Town	A	1–5	3,774	Dutton
20	27 December 1938	Ipswich Town	H	0–1	6,486	
21	31 December 1938	Brighton & Hove Albion	A	0–3	7,084	
22	11 January 1939	Newport County	H	0–2	1,419	
23	14 January 1939	Bournemouth & Boscombe Athletic	H	2–0	3,098	Somerfield, Turner
24	28 January 1939	Port Vale	H	2–0	3,742	Carter, Bungay
25	2 February 1939	Walsall	A	0–0	2,980	
26	4 February 1939	Queens Park Rangers	H	2–2	5,523	Dutton, Mee
27	11 February 1939	Southend United	A	0–2	6,195	
28	18 February 1939	Watford	A	0–2	7,254	
29	25 February 1939	Swindon Town	H	1–1	4,111	Turner
30	4 March 1939	Bristol City	A	0–2	8,270	
31	8 March 1939	Torquay United	H	4–0	800	Gardiner (2), Carter (2)
32	11 March 1939	Aldershot	H	1–0	3,218	Carter
33	18 March 1939	Notts County	A	1–1	11,629	Harkin
34	25 March 1939	Northampton Town	H	1–1	4,039	Carter
35	1 April 1939	Newport County	A	0–0	10,600	
36	7 April 1939	Reading	H	0–0	6,635	
37	8 April 1939	Clapton Orient	H	1–0	4,188	Flowers
38	10 April 1939	Reading	A	0–0	9,225	
39	15 April 1939	Torquay United	A	0–3	3,209	
40	22 April 1939	Crystal Palace	H	0–0	3,016	
41	29 April 1939	Cardiff City	A	0–0	5,886	
42	6 May 1939	Exeter City	H	4–2	2,632	Flowers, Harkin, Dutton (2)

=== FA Cup ===
Round	Date	Opponent	Venue	Result	Attendance	Scorers
R1	26 November 1938	Workington	A	1–1	11,137	Somerfield
R1 Replay	30 November 1938	Workington	H	2–1	5,111	Somerfield, Dutton
R2	10 December 1938	Halifax Town	A	1–1	14,208	Somerfield
R2 Replay	14 December 1938	Halifax Town	H	3–3	6,083	Dutton, Wilson, Bell
R2 2nd Replay	19 December 1938	Halifax Town	N	0–0	2,341	
R2 3rd Replay	21 December 1938	Halifax Town	N	1–2	1,219	Somerfield

=== Football League Third Division South Cup ===
Round	Date	Opponent	Venue	Result	Attendance	Scorers
R1	12 October 1938	Notts County	H	3–0	1,616	Bell, Gardiner, Wilson
R2	13 February 1939	Port Vale	A	1–3	1,000	Bell

== Squad statistics ==
- Squad list sourced from 1938–39 Mansfield Town F.C. season at the English National Football Archive (subscription required)

Pos.	Name	League		FA Cup		Third Division Cup		Total	
Pos.	Name	Apps	Goals	Apps	Goals	Apps	Goals	Apps	Goals
GK	(England) Daniel Black	5	0	6	0	0	0	11	0
GK	(Wales) John Hughes	37	0	0	0	2	0	39	0
DF	(England) Lloyd Barke	40	0	6	0	2	0	48	0
DF	(England) Ernest Bramley	13	0	0	0	0	0	13	0
DF	(England) Reg Bungay	27	3	6	0	2	0	35	3
DF	(Scotland) William Patterson	21	0	2	0	0	0	23	0
DF	(England) George Stimpson	42	0	6	0	2	0	50	0
MF	(England) Austin Collier	21	0	4	0	1	0	26	0
MF	(England) Jim Harkin	16	2	0	0	1	0	17	2
MF	(England) Joseph Hodgetts	1	0	0	0	0	0	1	0
MF	(England) Fred Speed	27	0	6	0	2	0	35	0
MF	(England) Alwyne Statham	3	0	0	0	0	0	3	0
FW	(England) Ernie Bell	28	1	6	1	2	2	36	4
FW	(England) Syd Carter	27	7	0	0	1	0	28	7
FW	(England) Tommy Dutton	39	12	6	2	2	0	47	14
FW	(England) Ivan Flowers	7	2	0	0	0	0	7	2
FW	(Scotland) Charlie Gardiner	27	4	2	0	1	1	30	5
FW	(England) Bertie Mee	13	1	0	0	1	0	14	1
FW	(England) Alf Somerfield	14	6	6	4	0	0	20	10
FW	(England) John Turner	34	4	4	0	2	0	40	4
FW	(England) Albert Wilson	20	2	6	1	1	1	27	4
