= List of Mansfield Town F.C. players =

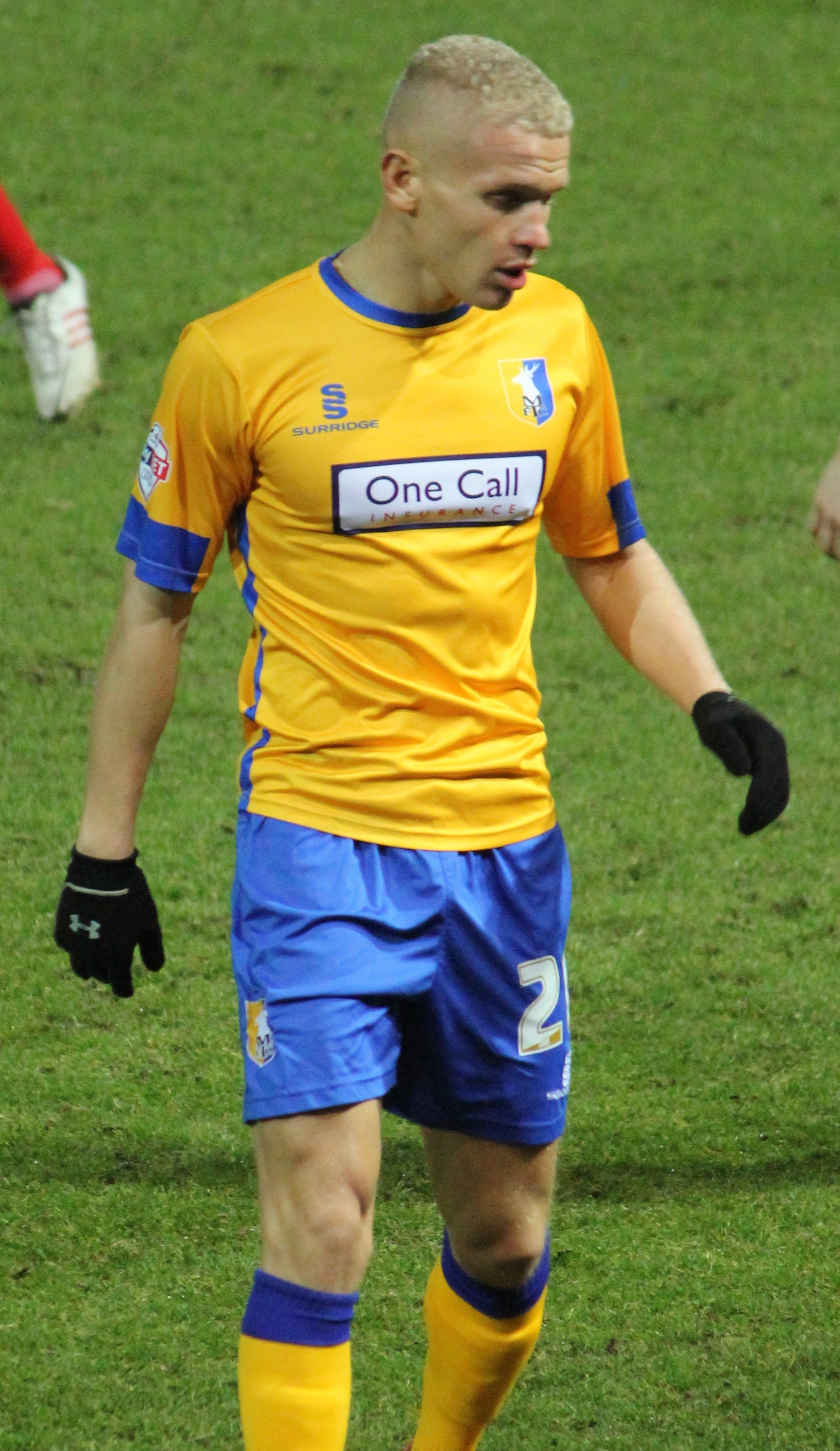
Lindon Meikle was a member of the Mansfield Town team that won the 2012–13 Conference Premier title.

Mansfield Town Football Club is an English professional association football club based in Mansfield, Nottinghamshire. As of the 2016–17 season, they play in League Two, the fourth tier level of the English football league system. The club was formed in 1897 as Mansfield Wesleyans. In 1906, the club turned professional, after which the Methodist church disowned the club and forbade them to use the name "Wesleyans". The club reacted by changing its name to Mansfield Wesley, before adopting the current name Mansfield Town in 1910.

The club began its existence playing in the Mansfield and District Amateur League. In 1911, Mansfield became a founding member of a new league, the Central Alliance. In 1919, the club moved to Field Mill, which remains their ground to this date, and in 1921, the club joined the Midland League. In 1924, the club applied to join the Football League, but was turned down. The club unsuccessfully applied several times to join the northern section of Football League's Third Division. However, in 1931, the club changed tactics and applied for membership in the southern section, and was finally elected to the league. The following season, Mansfield was transferred to the northern section to replace Wigan Borough who had folded during the previous season. The club remained in the bottom two divisions of the league with the exception of a single season at the second tier in 1977–78. The club also won the Football League Trophy in 1987, and defeated West Ham United to reach the quarter-finals of the FA Cup in 1968–69. In 2007–08, Mansfield Town was relegated to the Football Conference. They won promotion back to the Football League in 2012–13.

Goalkeeper Rod Arnold owns the club record for most games played for Mansfield Town. He made a total of 513 appearances for the club, 440 of those being in the league, between 1971 and 1984. Sandy Pate is second on Mansfield's all-time appearance list with 479 first-team games (413 in the league). Defenders Don Bradley, Kevin Bird and George Foster, the latter of whom also served as manager of the club, have also played more than 400 matches for Mansfield Town. Harry Johnson owns the club's all-time goalscoring record, with 114 goals. Incidentally, Johnson is also Sheffield United's all-time top goalscorer, having scored more than 200 goals for the Blades. Ken Wagstaff is second on the list with 106 goals, while Steve Wilkinson is third with 91 goals. The record for most goals in a single season belongs to Ted Harston, who scored 55 goals for Mansfield in the 1936–37 season, and was subsequently sold to Liverpool.

== Players with 50 or more appearances ==
The list comprises players with at least 50 first-team appearances, or 25 first-team goals for Mansfield Town since the club was elected to The Football League in 1931. Appearances and goals are for matches in the Football League (including playoffs and the war-abandoned 1939–40 season), Conference National, FA Cup, League Cup, Football League Trophy, FA Trophy, Conference League Cup, as well as the now-defunct Football League Group Cup, Anglo-Scottish Cup, Watney Cup, Third Division North Cup and Third Division South Cup. Substitute appearances are included.

The career field in the table indicates the seasons in which the player was on Mansfield's books. For instance, if the field says 1982–1991, it means this player played his first game for Mansfield in the 1982–83 season, and his last game for the club in the 1990–91 season, but not necessarily in every intervening season. However, if the player had two or more separate spells with the club, this is indicated with separate time periods in the table.

Statistics correct as of the end of the 2023–24 season. Current Mansfield Town players listed in bold.

Position key: GK – Goalkeeper; FB – Full-back; CD – Central defender; MF – Midfielder; WI – Winger; FW – Forward

Name	Nationality	Position	Mansfield Town career	Apps.	Goals
Charlie Adam	Scotland	WI	1952–1955	98	9
**Lucas Akins**	Grenada	FW	2022–Present	154	28
Russell Allen	England	FW	1978–1981	134	21
George Antonio	England	MF	1949–1951	75	3
Nathan Arnold	England	WI	2005–2009	117	14
Rod Arnold	England	GK	1970–1971; 1972–1984	513	0
David Artell	England	CD	2003–2005	55	5
Alistair Asher	England	FB	1999–2002	85	0
Jack Ashley	England	FB	1933–1936	78	0
Arthur Atkinson	England	WI	1934–1937	130	34
Will Atkinson	England	MF	2008; 2017–2019	83	3
Terry Austin	England	FW	1978–1981	99	35
Billy Ayre	England	CD	1982–1984	75	8
Danny Bacon	England	FW	1999–2003	56	5
George Banks	England	FW	1947–1949	69	21
Alex Baptiste	England	CD	2002–2008	198	6
Ian Baraclough	England	FB	1994–1996	62	5
Lloyd Barke	England	CD	1937–1947	136	0
Richard Barker	England	FW	2004–2007	106	48
Eddie Barks	England	MF	1948–1955	225	7
Stewart Barrowclough	England	WI	1983–1985	62	15
Chris Beardsley	England	FW	2002–2004; 2005–2007; 2015–2016	58	4
Andy Beasley	England	GK	1984–1993	109	0
Rhys Bennett	England	FB	2016–2018	97	4
Mal Benning	England	FB	2015–2021	251	10
Lee Beevers	England	FB	2012–2015	110	3
Charlie Bell	England	MF	1981–1983	96	14
Kevin Bird	England	CD	1972–1983	452	64
Nathan Bishop	England	GK	2021–2022	53	0
Neal Bishop	England	MF	2018–2020	78	4
Daniel Black	England	GK	1935–1939	54	0
Mark Blake	England	MF	1999–2001	94	10
Stuart Boam	England	CD	1966–1971; 1981–1983	215	4
Hiram Boateng	England	MF	2022–2025	127	10
Aidy Boothroyd	England	FB	1993–1996	121	3
Michael Boulding	England	FW	1999–2001; 2006–2008	168	43
George Bowater	England	FW	1931–1933	61	28
**Jordan Bowery**	England	FW	2020–Present	264	27
Ian Bowling	England	GK	1995–2001	196	0
Stuart Brace	England	WI	1966–1968	65	30
Don Bradley	England	FB	1949–1962	413	6
Louis Briscoe	England	WI	2008–2014	201	42
Graham Brown	England	GK	1969–1974; 1981–1982	165	0
Simon Brown	England	FW	2004–2008	126	23
Reg Bungay	England	MF	1936–1939	98	6
Adrian Burrows	England	FB	1979–1982	87	6
Jake Buxton	England	CD	2002–2008	174	5
George Bytheway	England	WI	1933–1936	94	23
Colin Calderwood	Scotland	CD	1981–1985	118	2
David Caldwell	Scotland	FW	1979–1985	188	64
Keith Cassells	England	FW	1985–1989	195	61
Gary Castledine	Scotland	MF	1991–1995	76	3
Neville Chamberlain	England	FW	1985–1987	76	23
Steve Chambers	England	FB	1986–1991	69	0
Adam Chapman	Northern Ireland	MF	2012–2013; 2015–2016	52	6
Roy Chapman	England	FW	1961–1965	150	88
Sammy Chapman	Northern Ireland	MF	1956–1958; 1961–1964	169	42
Steve Charles	England	MF	1987–1993	278	47
Harry Charsley	England	MF	2020–2022	77	7
Sammy Chessell	England	FB	1946–1954	281	7
Iyseden Christie	England	FW	1996–1999; 2002–2004	173	51
Trevor Christie	England	FW	1988–1991	107	28
Martin Clark	Scotland	MF	1989–1992	54	1
Darrell Clarke	England	MF	1995–2001	177	27
Ollie Clarke	England	MF	2020–2024	152	15
Ray Clarke	England	FW	1974–1976	114	59
Chris Clements	England	MF	2012–2016	153	11
David Coates	England	MF	1960–1964	173	19
Giles Coke	England	MF	2004–2007	82	7
John Coleman	England	FB	1966–1968	50	1
Simon Coleman	England	CD	1986–1990	118	8
Lee Collins	England	CB	2015–2017	82	0
Paul Connor	England	FW	2010–2012	65	19
Andy Cook	England	FW	2019–2021	52	9
Billy Coole	England	WI	1947–1954	193	38
Roy Cooling	England	FW	1947–1950	68	16
Wayne Corden	England	WI	2000–2005	218	38
Brian Cox	England	GK	1988–1990	65	0
Harold Crawshaw	England	FW	1937–1938	45	27
Charlie Croft	England	MF	1947–1950	91	5
Bill Curry	England	FW	1965–1968	113	57
Bob Curtis	England	FB	1977–1980	87	9
Tom Curtis	England	MF	2002–2005	103	2
Alan Daley	England	WI	1953–1956	100	26
Colin Daniel	England	MF	2012–2014; 2015–2016	86	11
George Darwin	England	FW	1953–1957	132	64
Derek Dawkins	England	FB	1978–1981	88	0
Stephen Dawson	Republic of Ireland	MF	2005–2008	131	4
Rhys Day	Wales	CD	2002–2006; 2010–2012	132	14
Lindy Delapenha	Jamaica	WI	1958–1961	120	27
John Dempster	Scotland	CD	2011–2015	97	7
Ray Devey	England	MF	1947–1950	82	4
Luke Dimech	Malta	CD	2003–2005	53	1
Craig Disley	England	MF	1999–2004	158	16
Jonathan D'Laryea	England	MF	2005–2009	153	3
Willie Donaldson	Scotland	WI	1950–1952	57	12
John Doolan	England	MF	1994–1998	151	14
Ted Dransfield	England	FB	1934–1937	85	1
Rob Duffy	Wales	FW	2008–2011	85	31
John Dungworth	England	FW	1982–1984	65	21
Ross Dyer	England	FW	2011–2014	65	13
Terry Eccles	England	FW	1973–1977	147	57
Dick Edwards	England	CD	1966–1968; 1973–1974	82	2
Frank Elliott	England	GK	1956–1958	69	0
Sam Ellis	England	CD	1971–1973	67	7
Ernie England	England	FB	1931–1935	137	4
Scott Eustace	England	CD	1995–1998	110	7
John Fairbrother	England	FW	1971–1973	92	43
Wayne Fairclough	England	MF	1989–1994	161	13
Des Fawcett	England	GK	1934–1936	78	0
Greg Fee	England	CD	1990–1993	56	7
Phil Ferns	England	CD	1966–1968	63	1
Arthur Fitzsimons	Republic of Ireland	FW	1959–1961	68	25
Paul Fleming	England	FB	1991–1995	79	0
**Aden Flint**	England	CB	2023–Present	93	3
Gary Ford	England	WI	1990–1993	98	6
Tony Ford	England	WI	1996–1999	116	9
Barry Foster	England	FB	1971–1982	343	0
Colin Foster	England	CD	1971–1979	241	19
George Foster	England	CD	1983–1993	448	3
Oscar Fox	England	MF	1950–1958	258	34
Walter Fox	England	FB	1946–1950	64	0
Mick Galloway	Scotland	CD	1983–1986	62	4
Paul Garner	England	FB	1984–1989	139	8
Scott Garner	England	CD	2008–2010	56	7
Johnny Gill	England	CD	1961–1966	153	0
Jimmy Goodfellow	Scotland	MF	1967–1971	117	16
Dave Goodwin	England	MF	1977–1980	58	8
Kellan Gordon	England	FB	2019–2023	88	2
Mike Graham	England	FB	1985–1989	168	2
Kevin Gray	England	CD	1988–1994	170	6
Matt Green	England	FW	2011–2013; 2015–2016	143	73
Chris Greenacre	England	FW	1999–2002	134	58
John Gregson	England	WI	1964–1967	82	5
Johnny Grogan	Scotland	CD	1947–1952	217	0
Warren Hackett	Saint Lucia	CD	1995–1999	130	5
Stewart Hadley	England	FW	1993–1998	145	34
Brian Hall	England	WI	1958–1965	81	24
Ian Hall	England	MF	1962–1968	160	13
CJ Hamilton	Republic of Ireland	WI	2016–2020	173	20
Neville Hamilton	England	MF	1978–1981	103	5
Matt Hamshaw	England	WI	2006–2008	96	7
Steve Harper	England	FB	1995–1999	181	19
Ted Harston	England	FW	1935–1937	75	85
Bobby Hassell	England	FB	1997–2004	180	3
Ian Hathaway	England	WI	1988–1991	50	3
Oliver Hawkins	England	FW	2021–2023	72	13
**Elliott Hewitt**	England	FB	2021–Present	138	3
Kevin Hitchcock	England	GK	1983–1988	224	0
Jon Olav Hjelde	Norway	CD	2005–2007	66	2
David Hodges	England	MF	1986–1991	98	8
Gordon Hodgson	England	MF	1974–1979	224	24
Freddie Hogg	England	FW	1946–1948	50	9
Paul Holland	England	MF	1990–1995	176	29
Ivan Hollett	England	FW	1958–1964	107	47
Dave Hollins	Wales	GK	1966–1970	126	0
Mick Hopkinson	England	FB	1968–1970	56	1
Lee Howarth	England	CD	1994–1996	73	2
Anthony Howell	England	MF	2008–2009; 2011–2014	118	13
Jack Hughes	Wales	GK	1937–1939	81	0
Wilf Humble	England	FB	1959–1966	213	2
Alan Humphreys	England	GK	1964–1968	64	0
Simon Ireland	England	WI	1993–1997	106	12
Alan Jarvis	Wales	MF	1970–1973	90	0
Brian Jayes	England	MF	1956–1960	125	1
Gareth Jelleyman	Wales	FB	2004–2008	144	3
Barry Jepson	England	FW	1953–1957	58	38
Harry Johnson	England	FW	1931–1936	172	114
Dai Jones	Wales	FB	1947–1949	80	0
Dai Jones (born 1941)	Wales	FW	1967–1972	140	34
Glyn Jones	England	FW	1959–1961	51	19
Luke Jones	England	CD	2009–2010; 2012–2013	65	12
Mick Jones	England	FB	1962–1966	98	0
Mark Kearney	England	WI	1982–1991	303	37
Ray Keeley	England	WI	1968–1970	65	11
Stan Keery	England	MF	1957–1959	57	17
Davis Keillor-Dunn	England	MF	2022–2024	75	29
Kevin Kent	England	WI	1985–1991	276	47
Tony Kenworthy	England	CD	1985–1989	124	0
David Kerr	Scotland	MF	1995–2000	94	4
Otis Khan	Pakistan	MF	2018–2020	53	4
Brian Kilcline	England	CD	1995–1997	54	3
Reggie Lambe	Bermuda	MF	2014–2016	74	10
George Lapslie	England	MF	2021–2023	104	23
Colin Larkin	Republic of Ireland	FW	2002–2005	106	26
John Lathan	England	MF	1973–1976; 1979–1980	117	16
Mick Laverick	England	MF	1972–1976	107	18
Jason Law	England	FW	2015–2023	52	1
Liam Lawrence	Republic of Ireland	WI	1999–2004	153	39
Bob Ledger	England	WI	1967–1970	65	18
Jack Lewis	England	MF	1948–1953	176	12
Conrad Logan	Republic of Ireland	GK	2017–2020	97	0
David Logan	England	FB	1984–1987	82	1
Dennis Longhorn	England	MF	1971–1974	106	6
Tony Lormor	England	FW	1998–2000	84	24
Tony Lowery	England	MF	1982–1991	317	27
Noel Luke	England	FB	1984–1986	63	11
Jim Lumby	England	FW	1980–1982	55	21
Jim McCaffrey	England	WI	1972–1977	211	27
Jimmy McCarter	Scotland	WI	1948–1950	72	10
John McClelland	Northern Ireland	CD	1978–1981	149	11
Ian McDonald	England	MF	1975–1978	75	11
Willie McGregor	Scotland	FB	1953–1956	124	0
Jamie McGuire	England	FB	2013–2016	84	3
Les McJannet	Scotland	FB	1979–1982	83	0
**Stephen McLaughlin**	Republic of Ireland	FB	2020–Present	196	18
Alex MacDonald	England	MF	2016–2020	123	6
Ian MacKenzie	England	CD	1975–1978	92	1
Neil MacKenzie	England	MF	2002–2004; 2008–2009	94	7
Craig McKernon	England	FB	1984–1990	114	0
Bill McKinney	England	FB	1966–1968	59	2
Paul McLoughlin	England	FW	1991–1994	68	10
Brian Macready	England	FW	1964–1966	53	13
Arthur Mann	Scotland	MF	1979–1982	132	3
Alan Marriott	England	GK	2008–2014	220	1
**George Maris**	England	MF	2020–Present	210	24
Chris Marron	England	FW	1952–1954	56	27
Dennis Martin	Scotland	MF	1977–1979	55	3
John Matthews	England	MF	1982–1984	84	6
Paul Matthews	England	MF	1972–1978	147	8
Nicky Maynard	England	FW	2019–2021	56	19
Lindon Meikle	England	WI	2011–2014	129	12
Jacob Mellis	England	MF	2017–2020	102	5
Ken Mellor	England	CD	1957–1959	71	0
Junior Mendes	Montserrat	MF	2002–2004	65	14
Harry Middleton	England	FW	1964–1966	50	25
Johnny Miller	England	WI	1976–1980	133	16
Bobby Mimms	England	GK	1999–2001	50	0
Tommy Mitchinson	England	MF	1965–1968	84	18
Charlie Mitten	England	WI	1955–1958	106	27
Fred Morris	England	WI	1956–1958	60	19
Peter Morris	England	MF	1960–1968; 1976–1978	365	53
Ernie Moss	England	FW	1976–1979	61	21
Carl Muggleton	England	GK	1999–2000; 2006–2008	71	0
Johnny Mullins	England	FB	2006–2008	97	5
Adam Murray	England	MF	2001–2002; 2004–2005; 2010–2015	211	25
Ken Murray	England	FW	1953–1957	145	61
Malcolm Murray	Scotland	FB	1989–1992	67	0
Gary Nicholson	England	WI	1981–1984	132	21
Kyle Nix	Australia	MF	2009–2011	55	5
Kevin Noteman	England	WI	1991–1995	111	16
Cliff Nugent	England	WI	1958–1960	54	8
**Rhys Oates**	England	FW	2021–Present	96	22
Harry Oscroft	England	FW	1946–1950	121	45
Sid Ottewell	England	FW	1949–1952	74	22
Gordon Owen	England	WI	1987–1989	62	8
John-Joe O'Toole	Republic of Ireland	CB	2021–2024	58	3
Ollie Palmer	England	FW	2013–2015	64	7
Steve Parkin	England	MF	1992–1996	106	4
Noel Parkinson	England	MF	1980–1982	79	17
Malcolm Partridge	England	FW	1967–1971	79	25
Sandy Pate	Scotland	FB	1967–1978	479	3
Bill Paterson	Scotland	CD	1937–1939	72	0
Lee Peacock	Scotland	FW	1997–2000	101	32
Krystian Pearce	Barbados	CB	2015–2020	217	16
Jason Pearcey	England	GK	1988–1995	91	0
Martin Pemberton	England	FB	2000–2002	62	5
James Perch	England	CB	2020–2023	102	4
Mark Peters	Wales	CD	1994–1999	128	10
Brian Phillips	England	CD	1960–1963	116	3
Kevin Pilkington	England	GK	2000–2005; 2010–2011	200	0
Norman Plummer	England	CD	1952–1956	174	5
Brian Pollard	England	WI	1979–1981	60	7
Gary Pollard	England	CD	1984–1987	86	2
Matt Preston	England	CB	2018–2020	72	4
**Christy Pym**	England	GK	2023–Present	138	0
Johnny Quigley	Scotland	MF	1968–1971	122	2
**Stephen Quinn**	Republic of Ireland	MF	2021–Present	179	12
Kevin Randall	England	FW	1975–1978	71	21
Farrend Rawson	England	CB	2020–2022	81	1
Joe Readman	England	FW	1931–1933	75	12
Stuart Reddington	England	CD	2000–2003	57	1
**Louis Reed**	England	MF	2023–Present	99	2
Ken Reeve	England	FW	1949–1954	145	62
Matt Rhead	England	FW	2011–2015	135	16
Bill Richardson	England	FB	1965–1968	70	0
Martin Riley	England	CD	2011–2012; 2013–2015	104	2
Bobby Roberts	Scotland	MF	1970–1972	87	5
Dudley Roberts	England	FW	1967–1974	230	73
Les Robinson	England	FB	1984–1987; 2000–2002	107	0
Sam Robinson	England	CD	1931–1934	64	1
Danny Rose	England	FW	2016–2021	165	44
Mitch Rose	England	FB	2015–2017	60	5
John Rowland	England	FW	1966–1968	53	16
Adam Rundle	England	WI	2004–2006	57	9
John Ryan	England	FB	1987–1989	77	2
Mark Sale	England	FW	1995–1997	52	13
John Saunders	England	CD	1969–1973	98	2
Keith Savin	England	FB	1957–1959	72	0
Mick Saxby	England	CD	1975–1979	90	5
Albert Scanlon	England	WI	1962–1966	116	24
John Schofield	England	MF	1997–1999	98	0
Ben Sedgemore	England	MF	1995–1998	84	6
Nick Sharkey	Scotland	FW	1967–1970	80	21
Scott Shearer	Scotland	GK	2015–2017	53	0
Gary Silk	England	FB	2008–2011	131	2
Bill Slack	England	MF	1932–1936	131	1
Mark Smalley	England	CD	1989–1991	52	2
Adam Smith	England	WI	2010–2012	50	8
Matt Somner	Wales	MF	2008–2010	70	2
Fred Speed	England	MF	1936–1939	114	6
Jake Speight	England	FW	2009–2010; 2012–2014	72	27
Steve Spooner	England	MF	1990–1993	66	3
Phil Stant	England	FW	1991–1994	70	35
Freddie Steele	England	FW	1949–1952	62	44
John Stenson	England	MF	1969–1972	126	26
Lee Stevenson	England	MF	2011–2014	59	17
George Stimpson	England	FB	1937–1939	97	0
Ian Stringfellow	England	FW	1985–1994	206	38
Mike Stringfellow	England	WI	1960–1962	65	12
Ritchie Sutton	England	FB	2011–2015	154	0
Will Swan	England	FW	2022–2024	78	20
Ryan Sweeney	Republic of Ireland	CB	2018–2021	127	7
Dave Syrett	England	FW	1977–1979	79	24
Ryan Tafazolli	England	CD	2012–2016	118	9
Gary Tallon	Republic of Ireland	MF	1997–2000	85	2
Barrie Thomas	England	FW	1957–1960	73	49
David Thompson	England	WI	1970–1974	148	24
Brian Thomson	Scotland	WI	1979–1982	74	2
Colin Toon	England	FB	1957–1966	231	1
Colin Treharne	Wales	GK	1961–1966	212	0
Jack Turner	England	WI	1937–1939	65	9
Dennis Uphill	England	FW	1956–1959	84	40
Mick Vinter	England	FW	1984–1986	71	10
Ken Wagstaff	England	FW	1960–1965	196	106
Clive Walker	England	FB	1969–1975	260	10
Johnny Walker	Scotland	MF	1996–1999	82	4
Tyler Walker	England	FW	2018–2019	50	26
Phil Waller	England	CD	1968–1972	187	3
Darren Ward	Wales	GK	1992–1995	97	0
Sid Watson	England	MF	1951–1961	307	11
Neil Whatmore	England	FW	1984–1988	100	24
Andy White	England	FW	2000–2004	76	10
Hayden White	England	FB	2017–2020	86	2
Jason White	England	GK	2002–2009	63	0
Steve Whitehall	England	FW	1997–1998	49	26
Steve Whitworth	England	FB	1983–1985	94	2
Frank Wignall	England	FW	1971–1973	61	16
Steve Wilkinson	England	FW	1989–1995	274	91
Bill Williams	England	CD	1965–1968	56	1
George Williams	England	MF	1957–1962	163	5
Lee Williams	England	MF	1996–2002	196	9
Ryan Williams	England	WI	1995–1997; 2008–2011	84	6
Lee Williamson	Jamaica	MF	1999–2005	166	3
Chris Withe	England	FB	1990–1993	84	5
Ian Wood	England	FB	1975–1982	173	11
Simon Woodhead	England	FB	1980–1985	135	6
Dennis Wright	England	GK	1946–1957	399	0
Bob Wyllie	Scotland	GK	1959–1962	100	0

== Sources ==
- "allfootballers.com".
- Retter, Jack (1995). Who's Who – The Stags 1902–1995. Yore Publications. ISBN 1-874427-31-3.
- Bracegirdle, Dave & Hartshorn, Steve (2004). The Legends of Mansfield Town. Breedon Books. ISBN 1-85983-435-3.
- "Post War English & Scottish Football League A - Z Player's Database". Neil Brown.
- "Soccerbase.com".
