= Alwyne =

Alwyne is an English given name. Notable people with this name include:

- Alwyne Compton (disambiguation)
  - Lord Alwyne Compton (bishop)
  - Lord Alwyne Compton (politician)
- Alwyne Wilks
- Alwyne Statham
- John Alwyne Kitching
- Alwyne Jan "AJ" Perez
- Gilbert Byng Alwyne Russell
- Alwyne Michael Webster Whistler
