= 1937–38 in English football =

Football in England
- Season: 1937–38

Men's football
- Football League: Arsenal
- Football League Second Division: Aston Villa
- FA Cup: Preston North End

The 1937–38 season was the 63rd season of competitive football in England.

== Overview ==
Manchester City became the only team to have been relegated in the season after winning the league title as well as the only team to ever be relegated from the top tier of English football having scored the most goals in that particular season.

The points spread between the league champions, Arsenal, and the team that finished bottom of the league, West Bromwich Albion, was a mere 16 points.

Arsenal won the title (the club's fifth) on the final day of the season with a mere 52 points from 42 matches after beating Bolton Wanderers 5–0 at Highbury, while the table leaders after the penultimate round of fixtures, Wolverhampton Wanderers, lost 1–0 to 10-man Sunderland at Roker Park to be denied their first league title. Wolves, who finished as runners-up for the first time in their history, had to wait until 1953–54 to win their first English league title, although by that time they had once again been pipped to the title late in the season – by Liverpool in 1946-47.

== Honours ==
Competition	Winner	Runner-up
First Division	Arsenal (5)	Wolverhampton Wanderers
Second Division	Aston Villa	Manchester United
Third Division North	Tranmere Rovers	Doncaster Rovers
Third Division South	Millwall	Bristol City
FA Cup	Preston North End (2)	Huddersfield Town
Charity Shield	Manchester City	Sunderland
Home Championship	England	Scotland

Notes = Number in parentheses is the times that club has won that honour. * indicates new record for competition

== Football League ==
=== First Division ===
Pos	Team	Pld	W	D	L	GF	GA	GAv	Pts	Relegation
1	Arsenal (C)	42	21	10	11	77	44	1.750	52	
2	Wolverhampton Wanderers	42	20	11	11	72	49	1.469	51	
3	Preston North End	42	16	17	9	64	44	1.455	49	
4	Charlton Athletic	42	16	14	12	65	51	1.275	46	
5	Middlesbrough	42	19	8	15	72	65	1.108	46	
6	Brentford	42	18	9	15	69	59	1.169	45	
7	Bolton Wanderers	42	15	15	12	64	60	1.067	45	
8	Sunderland	42	14	16	12	55	57	0.965	44	
9	Leeds United	42	14	15	13	64	69	0.928	43	
10	Chelsea	42	14	13	15	65	65	1.000	41	
11	Liverpool	42	15	11	16	65	71	0.915	41	
12	Blackpool	42	16	8	18	61	66	0.924	40	
13	Derby County	42	15	10	17	66	87	0.759	40	
14	Everton	42	16	7	19	79	75	1.053	39	
15	Huddersfield Town	42	17	5	20	55	68	0.809	39	
16	Leicester City	42	14	11	17	54	75	0.720	39	
17	Stoke City	42	13	12	17	58	59	0.983	38	
18	Birmingham	42	10	18	14	58	62	0.935	38	
19	Portsmouth	42	13	12	17	62	68	0.912	38	
20	Grimsby Town	42	13	12	17	51	68	0.750	38	
21	Manchester City (R)	42	14	8	20	80	77	1.039	36	Relegation to the Second Division
22	West Bromwich Albion (R)	42	14	8	20	74	91	0.813	36	Relegation to the Second Division

Source: World Football
Rules for classification: 1) Points; 2) Goal average; 3) Goals scored
(C) Champions; (R) Relegated

=== Second Division ===
Pos	Team	Pld	W	D	L	GF	GA	GAv	Pts	Qualification or relegation
1	Aston Villa (C, P)	42	25	7	10	73	35	2.086	57	Promotion to the First Division
2	Manchester United (P)	42	22	9	11	82	50	1.640	53	Promotion to the First Division
3	Sheffield United	42	22	9	11	73	56	1.304	53	
4	Coventry City	42	20	12	10	66	45	1.467	52	
5	Tottenham Hotspur	42	19	6	17	76	54	1.407	44	
6	Burnley	42	17	10	15	54	54	1.000	44	
7	Bradford (Park Avenue)	42	17	9	16	69	56	1.232	43	
8	Fulham	42	16	11	15	61	57	1.070	43	
9	West Ham United	42	14	14	14	53	52	1.019	42	
10	Bury	42	18	5	19	63	60	1.050	41	
11	Chesterfield	42	16	9	17	63	63	1.000	41	
12	Luton Town	42	15	10	17	89	86	1.035	40	
13	Plymouth Argyle	42	14	12	16	57	65	0.877	40	
14	Norwich City	42	14	11	17	56	75	0.747	39	
15	Southampton	42	15	9	18	55	77	0.714	39	
16	Blackburn Rovers	42	14	10	18	71	80	0.888	38	
17	Sheffield Wednesday	42	14	10	18	49	56	0.875	38	
18	Swansea Town	42	13	12	17	45	73	0.616	38	
19	Newcastle United	42	14	8	20	51	58	0.879	36	
20	Nottingham Forest	42	14	8	20	47	60	0.783	36	
21	Barnsley (R)	42	11	14	17	50	64	0.781	36	Relegation to the Third Division North
22	Stockport County (R)	42	11	9	22	43	70	0.614	31	Relegation to the Third Division North

Rules for classification: 1) Points; 2) Goal average; 3) Goals scored
(C) Champions; (P) Promoted; (R) Relegated

=== Third Division North ===
Pos	Team	Pld	W	D	L	GF	GA	GAv	Pts	Promotion
1	Tranmere Rovers (C, P)	42	23	10	9	81	41	1.976	56	Promotion to the Second Division
2	Doncaster Rovers	42	21	12	9	74	49	1.510	54	
3	Hull City	42	20	13	9	80	43	1.860	53	
4	Oldham Athletic	42	19	13	10	67	46	1.457	51	
5	Gateshead	42	20	11	11	84	59	1.424	51	
6	Rotherham United	42	20	10	12	68	56	1.214	50	
7	Lincoln City	42	19	8	15	66	50	1.320	46	
8	Crewe Alexandra	42	18	9	15	71	53	1.340	45	
9	Chester	42	16	12	14	77	72	1.069	44	
10	Wrexham	42	16	11	15	58	63	0.921	43	
11	York City	42	16	10	16	70	68	1.029	42	
12	Carlisle United	42	15	9	18	57	67	0.851	39	
13	New Brighton	42	15	8	19	60	61	0.984	38	
14	Bradford City	42	14	10	18	66	69	0.957	38	
15	Port Vale	42	12	14	16	65	73	0.890	38	Transferred to the Third Division South
16	Southport	42	12	14	16	53	82	0.646	38	
17	Rochdale	42	13	11	18	67	78	0.859	37	
18	Halifax Town	42	12	12	18	44	66	0.667	36	
19	Darlington	42	11	10	21	54	79	0.684	32	
20	Hartlepools United	42	10	12	20	53	80	0.663	32	
21	Barrow	42	11	10	21	41	71	0.577	32	Re-elected
22	Accrington Stanley	42	11	7	24	45	75	0.600	29	Re-elected

Source: rsssf.com
(C) Champions; (P) Promoted

=== Third Division South ===
Pos	Team	Pld	W	D	L	GF	GA	GAv	Pts	Promotion or relegation
1	Millwall (C, P)	42	23	10	9	83	37	2.243	56	Promotion to the Second Division
2	Bristol City	42	21	13	8	68	40	1.700	55	
3	Queens Park Rangers	42	22	9	11	80	47	1.702	53	
4	Watford	42	21	11	10	73	43	1.698	53	
5	Brighton & Hove Albion	42	21	9	12	64	44	1.455	51	
6	Reading	42	20	11	11	71	63	1.127	51	
7	Crystal Palace	42	18	12	12	67	47	1.426	48	
8	Swindon Town	42	17	10	15	49	49	1.000	44	
9	Northampton Town	42	17	9	16	51	57	0.895	43	
10	Cardiff City	42	15	12	15	67	54	1.241	42	
11	Notts County	42	16	9	17	50	50	1.000	41	
12	Southend United	42	15	10	17	70	68	1.029	40	
13	Bournemouth & Boscombe Athletic	42	14	12	16	56	57	0.982	40	
14	Mansfield Town	42	15	9	18	62	67	0.925	39	
15	Bristol Rovers	42	13	13	16	46	61	0.754	39	
16	Newport County	42	11	16	15	43	52	0.827	38	
17	Exeter City	42	13	12	17	57	70	0.814	38	
18	Aldershot	42	15	5	22	39	59	0.661	35	
19	Clapton Orient	42	13	7	22	42	61	0.689	33	
20	Torquay United	42	9	12	21	38	73	0.521	30	
21	Walsall	42	11	7	24	52	88	0.591	29	Re-elected
22	Gillingham (R)	42	10	6	26	36	77	0.468	26	Failed re-election and demoted to the Southern League

(C) Champions; (P) Promoted; (R) Relegated

=== Top goalscorers ===
First Division

- Tommy Lawton (Everton) – 28 goals

Second Division

- George Henson (Bradford Park Avenue) – 27 goals

Third Division North

- Jack Roberts (Port Vale) – 28 goals

Third Division South

- Harold Crawshaw (Mansfield Town) – 25 goals

== National team ==
A tour to central Europe was successful as the England squad comprehensively beat Germany in front of Adolf Hitler and Joseph Goebbels in Berlin as well as defeating France in Paris. However, between these successes was another defeat; to Switzerland. The tour was considered very controversial as the players were instructed to give the German leaders the Nazi salute during the anthems before the kick-off of the match in Berlin.

=== European tour ===
14 May 1938

Germany	3–6	England
Rudi Gellesch, Jupp Gauchel, Hans Pesser		Jackie Robinson 2, Cliff Bastin, Frank Broome, Stanley Matthews, Len Goulden

Olympiastadion, Berlin

21 May 1938

Switzerland	2–1	England
André Abegglen, Georges Aeby		Cliff Bastin (P)

Hardturm, Zürich

26 May 1938

France	2–4	England
Auguste Jordan, Jean Nicolas		Ted Drake 2, Frank Broome, Cliff Bastin (P)

Stade Olympique Yves-du-Manoir, Paris
