= 1933–34 Queens Park Rangers F.C. season =

English football club season

Queens Park Rangers
1933–34 season
- Chairman: Charles W Fielding
- Manager: Mick O'Brien
- Stadium: Loftus Road
- Football League Third Division South: 4th
- Football League Third Division South Cup.: 3rd Round
- F A Cup: 3rd Round
- Top goalscorer: League: Jack Blackman 24; All: Jack Blackman 31
- Highest home attendance: 19,347 Vs Leyton Orient (Mon 25 Dec 1933)
- Lowest home attendance: 3,050 Vs Brighton & Hove Albion (Thu 8 Mar 1934)
- Average home league attendance: 10,281
- Biggest win: 6–0 Vs Kettering Town. (Sat 25 Nov 1933)
- Biggest defeat: 0–5 Vs Reading (Sat 31 Mar 1934)
Home colours	Away colours

The 1933–34 Queens Park Rangers season was the club's 43rd season of existence and their 14th season in the Football League Third Division. QPR finished 4th in the league, and were eliminated in the third round of the FA Cup. The club moved back to Loftus Road from White City Stadium during the season due to financial difficulties.

== League standings ==
Pos	Team	Pld	W	D	L	GF	GA	GAv	Pts
2	Coventry City	42	21	12	9	100	54	1.852	54
3	Reading	42	21	12	9	82	50	1.640	54
4	Queens Park Rangers	42	24	6	12	70	51	1.373	54
5	Charlton Athletic	42	22	8	12	83	56	1.482	52
6	Luton Town	42	21	10	11	83	61	1.361	52

=== Results ===
QPR scores given first

Win Draw Loss

=== Third Division South ===
Date	Venue	Opponent	Result	Score F–A	Scorers	Attendance	Position
Sat 26 August 1933	H	Brighton and Hove Albion	W	2–0	Clarke 2	11,986	10
Wed 30 August 1933	A	Swindon Town	L	1–3	Emmerson	9,342	12
Sat 2 September 1933	A	Aldershot	L	1–3	Devine	6,020	15
Thu 7 September 1933	H	Swindon Town	W	1–0	Eaton	5,956	13
Sat 9 September 1933	H	Luton Town	W	2–1	Emmerson, Clarke	10,110	11
Sat 16 September 1933	A	Northampton Town	L	1–2	Devine	7,025	12
Sat 23 September 1933	H	Torquay United	W	2–0	Blackman, Emmerson	6,400	9
Sat 30 September 1933	A	Exeter City	D	1–1	Blackman	7,128	8
Sat 7 October 1933	A	Newport County	W	2–1	OG, Blackman	7,463	8
Sat 14 October 1933	H	Norwich City	W	5–2	Emmerson 2, Blackman 2, Clarke	8,573	2
Sat 21 October 1933	H	Cardiff City	W	4–0	Blake 2, Emmerson, Blackman	12,169	1
Sat 28 October 1933	A	Bournemouth and Boscombe Athletic	L	2–3	Allen, Clarke	6,324	4
Sat 4 November 1933	H	Charlton Athletic	W	2–1	Blackman, Clarke	15,677	2
Sat 11 November 1933	A	Watford	D	0–0		14,299	5
Sat 18 November 1933	H	Reading	D	0–0		11,867	5
Sat 2 December 1933	H	Southend United	W	4–0	Brown, Devine, Emmerson, Blake	8,191	2
9-Dec-33	A	Bristol Rovers		pp			
Sat 16 December 1933	H	Crystal Palace	W	2–1	Blackman, Blake	12,849	2
Sat 23 December 1933	A	Gillingham	W	4–1	Blackman 3, Eaton	6,979	2
Mon 25 December 1933	H	Leyton Orient	W	2–0	Blackman,Brown	19,347	2
Tue 26 December 1933	A	Leyton Orient	D	2–2	Blackman 2	6,274	2
Sat 30 December 1933	A	Brighton and Hove Albion	W	1–0	Blackman	6,579	1
Sat 6 January 1934	H	Aldershot	L	2–4	Devine, Blake	13,100	3
13-Jan-34	A	Coventry City		PP			
Thu 18 January 1934	A	Coventry City	W	1–0	Emmerson	9,703	2
Sat 20 January 1934	A	Luton Town	L	2–4	OG 2, Kingham 2	8,096	2
27 January 1934	H	Northampton Town		PP			
Wed 31 January 1934	H	Northampton Town	W	2–1	Brown 2	5,368	2
Sat 3 February 1934	A	Torquay United	D	1–1	Brown	3,153	3
Sat 10 February 1934	H	Exeter City	W	2–0	Emmerson, Blackman	12,380	2
Sat 17 February 1934	H	Newport County	W	2–1	Devine, Allen	7,278	2
Sat 24 February 1934	A	Norwich City	L	0–1		20,390	2
Sat 3 March 1934	A	Cardiff City	L	1–3	Brown	6,140	3
Sat 10 March 1934	H	Bournemouth and Boscombe Athletic	W	1–0	Brown	7,149	2
Sat 17 March 1934	A	Charlton Athletic	W	2–1	Emmerson, Blackman	14,491	2
Sat 24 March 1934	H	Watford	D	0–0		8,205	2
Fri 30 March 1934	H	Bristol City	W	1–0	Blackman	12,912	2
Sat 31 March 1934	A	Reading	L	0–5		10,864	2
Mon 2 April 1934	A	Bristol City	W	2–0	Devine, Blackman	11,441	2
Sat 7 April 1934	H	Coventry City	L	0–1		9,562	3
Sat 14 April 1934	A	Southend United	W	2–0	Devine, Blackman	5,249	3
Wed 18 April 1934	A	Bristol Rovers	L	1–4	Hammond	4,875	4
Sat 21 April 1934	H	Bristol Rovers	W	1–0	March	6,248	3
Sat 28 April 1934	A	Crystal Palace	L	1–4	Blackman	7,777	4
Sat 5 May 1934	H	Gillingham	W	5–0	Blackman 3, Hammond, Devine	5,129	4

=== F A Cup ===
Round	Date	Venue	Opponent	Result	Score F–A	Scorers	Attendance
FA Cup 1	Sat 25 November 1933	H	Kettering Town (Central Combination)	W	6–0	Blackman 2, Emmerson 2, Allen, Brown	10,000
FA Cup 2	Sat 9 December 1933	H	New Brighton AFC (Third Division North)	D	1–1	Blackman	12,000
FA Cup 2R	Wed 13 December 1933	A	New Brighton AFC (Third Division North)	W	4–0	Blackman 4	5,062
FA Cup 3	Sat 13 January 1934	A	Nottingham Forest (Second Division)	L	0–4		21,170

=== Division 3 South Cup ===
Round	Date	Venue	Opponent	Result	Score F–A	Scorers	Attendance
2	Wed 28 February 1934	H	Reading	W	2–0	Brown 2	3,070
3	Thu 8 March 1934	H	Brighton & Hove Albion	L	1–2	Hammond	3,050

=== London Challenge Cup ===
Round	Date	Opponent	Venue	Result	Score F–A	Scorers	Attendance
1	9 December 1933	Chelsea	H	L	1–2	Jones (pen)	

=== Friendlies ===
12 August 1933	Hoops v Reds (H)	H	
19 August 1933	Hoops v Reds (H)	H	
27-Jan-34	Royal Air Force	h	Friendly

== Squad ==
Position	Nationality	Name	Third Division South		FA Cup		Third Division South Cup		Total	
Position	Nationality	Name	Apps	Goals	Apps	Goals	Apps	Goals	Apps	Goals
GK	ENG	Ernie Beecham	34		4				38	
GK	ENG	Bill Mason	8				2		10	
DF	ENG	Don Ashman	42		4		1		47	
DF	ENG	Jimmy Allan	26	2	2	1	1		29	4
DF	ENG	Sidney Russell	1				1		2	
DF	ENG	Wally Rivers	3				1		4	
DF		Walter Barrie	41		4		2		47	
DF	ENG	Ted Goodier	30		4				34	
MF	SCO	Alec Farmer	12				1		13	
MF		Joe Hammond	5	2			2	1	7	3
MF	ENG	Dicky March	40	1	4		1		45	1
MF		Albert Blake	38	5	4		1		43	5
MF	ENG	Walter Langford	9				1		10	
MF	ENG	George Emmerson	37	10	4	2	2		43	12
MF	ENG	Frank Eaton	15	2	2		2		19	2
FW	ENG	Jack Blackman	36	24	4	7			40	31
FW	ENG	George Goddard	6				1		7	
FW	SCO	Joe Devine	37	8	4		1		42	8
FW	ENG	Tommy Dutton								
FW	ENG	Dick Brown	24	7	4	1	1	2	29	10
FW	ENG	George Clarke	15	6			1		16	5
FW	WAL	Charlie Jones	3						3	

== Transfers in ==
Name	from	Date	Fee
Frank Eaton	Reading	July 1933	
George Clarke	Crystal Palace	July 1933	
Walter Rivers	Crystal Palace	22 May 1933	
Bill Mason	Fulham	July 1933	
Albert Blake	Watford	Aug 1933	Free
Walter Langford	Leicester City	3 Aug 1933	
Alec Farmer	Nottingham Forest	2 September 1933	
Terry McCarthy	Hanwell Town	9 September 1933	
Bill Field	Hereford U	4 October 1933	
Bill Ford	South Shields Corinthians	12 December 1933	
Ernest Scott		13 December 1933	
Tommy Dutton	Leicester City	1934	
Joe Hammond	London Paper Mill	13 January 1934	
Watson, George	Shotton Colliery	24 January 1934	

== Transfers out ==
Name	from	Date	Fee	Date	To	Fee
Gerry Keizer	Charlton	26 July 1932		1933	Ajax (Hol)	
Dilling, A		1932		1933	Sutton United	
Collins, Jimmy	Wimbledon	17 October 931		July 1933	Bradford C	
Tom Nixon	Crawcrook Albion	1927		July 33	Crystal Palace	
Jobson, Jack	Stockport	24 June 1932		July 1933	Gateshead	
Hill, Joe	Barnsley	19 July 1932		July 1933	Stockport	
Wiles, Harry	Sittingbourne	9 May 1929		July 1933	Walsall	
Ferrari, Fred	Mansfield	Jan 1931		Sep 1933	Hillsborough Old Boys	
Adlam, Leslie	Oldham	13 November 1931	£750	Dec 1933	Cardiff	Free
George Goddard	Redhill	1926		December 1933	Wolverhampton	£1,200
Leslie Adlam	Oldham Athletic	1931		December 1933	Cardiff City	
Charlie Jones	North End	1932		1934		
Ernest Scott		13 December 1933		Feb 1934		
Hall, Ernie	Bedworth Town	6 May 1930		June 34	Chester	
Eaton, Frank	Reading	July1933		June 34	Macclesfield	
