= Sydney Carter (disambiguation) =

Sydney Carter (1915–2004) was an English poet, songwriter and folk musician

Sydney, Sidney, Sydnee or Syd Carter may also refer to:

- Sydney Carter (basketball) (born 1990), college and WNBA basketball player
- Syd Carter (1916–1978), English footballer
- Sidney Carter (1878–1943), pseudonym of composer, occasional lyricist, and music publisher Charles N. Daniels
- Sydnee Carter, a finalist in The X Factor (Australia season 6)
