= 1937–38 Arsenal F.C. season =

English football club season

Arsenal
1937–38 season
- Chairman: Bernard Forbes, 8th Earl of Granard
- Manager: George Allison
- Stadium: Highbury
- First Division: 1st
- FA Cup: Fifth Round

The 1937–38 season was Arsenal's 19th consecutive season in the top division of English football. They won the league for the fifth time in eight years, beating Wolverhampton Wanderers by a point with a 5–0 final day victory over Bolton Wanderers. The Gunners had staged a surprise comeback to win the league after being eleventh in November, and went out of the FA Cup at the fifth round stage in February. Ted Drake once again top-scored for the Gunners with eighteen goals in all competition, with 17 of them coming in the league, but an injury to Drake forced manager George Allison to improvise with Eddie Carr up front, but he came to the fore with five goals in the final three games, with Arsenal winning each one.

== Results ==
Arsenal's score comes first

=== Legend ===
Win	Draw	Loss

=== Football League First Division ===
Date	Opponent	Venue	Result	Attendance	Scorers
28 August 1937	Everton	A	4–1	53,856	
1 September 1937	Huddersfield Town	H	3–1	32,758	
4 September 1937	Wolverhampton Wanderers	H	5–0	67,311	
8 September 1937	Huddersfield Town	A	1–2	28,405	
11 September 1937	Leicester City	A	1–1	39,106	
15 September 1937	Bolton Wanderers	A	0–1	39,750	
18 September 1937	Sunderland	H	4–1	65,635	
25 September 1937	Derby County	A	0–2	33,101	
2 October 1937	Manchester City	H	2–1	68,353	
9 October 1937	Chelsea	A	2–2	75,952	
16 October 1937	Portsmouth	H	1–1	45,150	
23 October 1937	Stoke City	A	1–1	35,684	
30 October 1937	Middlesbrough	H	1–2	39,066	
6 November 1937	Grimsby Town	A	1–2	20,244	
13 November 1937	West Bromwich Albion	H	1–1	40,324	
20 November 1937	Charlton Athletic	A	3–0	55,078	
27 November 1937	Leeds United	H	4–1	34,350	
4 December 1937	Birmingham	A	2–1	18,440	
11 December 1937	Preston North End	H	2–0	35,679	
18 December 1937	Liverpool	A	0–2	32,093	
25 December 1937	Blackpool	A	1–2	23,229	
27 December 1937	Blackpool	H	2–1	54,163	
1 January 1938	Everton	H	2–1	36,953	
15 January 1938	Wolverhampton Wanderers	A	1–3	39,383	
29 January 1938	Sunderland	A	1–1	42,638	
2 February 1938	Leicester City	H	3–1	23,839	
5 February 1938	Derby County	H	3–0	47,263	
16 February 1938	Manchester City	A	2–1	34,299	
19 February 1938	Chelsea	H	2–0	49,573	
26 February 1938	Portsmouth	A	0–0	43,991	
5 March 1938	Stoke City	H	2–0	35,296	
12 March 1938	Middlesbrough	A	1–2	46,747	
19 March 1938	Grimsby Town	H	5–1	40,701	
26 March 1938	West Bromwich Albion	A	0–0	45,944	
2 April 1938	Charlton Athletic	H	2–2	52,858	
9 April 1938	Leeds United	A	1–0	29,365	
15 April 1938	Brentford	H	0–2	51,299	
16 April 1938	Birmingham	H	0–0	35,161	
18 April 1938	Brentford	A	0–3	34,601	
23 April 1938	Preston North End	A	3–1	42,684	
30 April 1938	Liverpool	H	1–0	34,703	
7 May 1938	Bolton Wanderers	H	5–0	40,500	

==== Final League table ====
Pos	Team	Pld	W	D	L	GF	GA	GAv	Pts
1	Arsenal (C)	42	21	10	11	77	44	1.750	52
2	Wolverhampton Wanderers	42	20	11	11	72	49	1.469	51
3	Preston North End	42	16	17	9	64	44	1.455	49
4	Charlton Athletic	42	16	14	12	65	51	1.275	46
5	Middlesbrough	42	19	8	15	72	65	1.108	46

Source: World Football
Rules for classification: 1) Points; 2) Goal average; 3) Goals scored
(C) Champions

=== FA Cup ===
Arsenal entered the FA Cup in the third round, in which they were drawn to face Bolton Wanderers.

Round	Date	Opponent	Venue	Result	Attendance	Goalscorers
R3	8 January 1938	Bolton Wanderers	H	3–1	64,016	
R4	22 January 1938	Wolverhampton Wanderers	A	2–1	61,267	
R5	12 February 1938	Preston North End	H	0–1	72,121	

== See also ==
- 1937–38 in English football
- List of Arsenal F.C. seasons
