= William McGregor =

William McGregor may refer to:

- William McGregor (football) (1846–1911), founder of the Football League
- William McGregor (judoka) (born 1949), Canadian Olympic judoka
- William McGregor (politician) (1836–1903), Canadian businessman and political figure
- William McGregor (director) (born 1987), British screenwriter and director
- William B. McGregor (born 1952), Australian linguist and professor
- William Roy McGregor (1894–1977), New Zealand zoologist and early conservationist
- Will McGregor (Wild Roses), a character on Wild Roses
- Billy McGregor (1876–1919), Australian rules footballer
- Bill McGregor, football player in the 1973 CFL draft
- Willie McGregor, Mansfield Town F.C. player
- Billy McGregor (ice hockey), ice hockey player in the 1938 Memorial Cup

== See also ==
- William MacGregor (disambiguation)
- William Gregor (1761–1817), British clergyman and mineralogist
