= Raymond O'Connor =

Raymond or Ray O'Connor may refer to:

- Raymond O'Connor (footballer) (1913–1980), English footballer
- Ray O'Connor (1926–2013), Australian politician
- Remo Capitani (1927–2014), Italian actor, also credited as Ray O'Connor
- Raymond O'Connor (actor) (1955–2023), American actor
