= William MacGregor (disambiguation) =

William MacGregor (1846–1919) was a Lieutenant-Governor of British New Guinea, Governor of Newfoundland and Governor of Queensland.

William or Bill(y) MacGregor may also refer to:

- Sir William Macgregor, 2nd Baronet (1817–1846), British Army officer
- William MacGregor (Australian politician) (1853–1899), New South Wales politician
- William York Macgregor (1855–1923), Scottish landscape painter
- William MacGregor (judge) (1862–1934), New Zealand King's Counsel
- William Firth MacGregor (1896–?), painter, illustrator and artist
- William Macgregor (cricketer) (1888–1980), Australian cricketer and veterinarian
- Bill MacGregor (politician), American politician and member of the Massachusetts House of Representatives

== Characters ==
- Bill MacGregor, character on Second Thoughts
- Billy MacGregor, character in Head of the Class and Billy

== Musicians ==
- Will MacGregor, musician in Fear
- Bill MacGregor, musician in High Holy Days

== See also ==
- William McGregor (disambiguation)
- William Gregor (1761–1817), British clergyman and mineralogist
