= 1937–38 Football League =

46th season of the Football League

The Football League
- Season: 1937–38
- Champions: Arsenal

The 1937–38 season was the 46th season of The Football League. Manchester City, champions in 1936–37, were relegated, the only time this has happened in the English top flight.

== Final league tables ==
The tables and results below are reproduced here in the exact form that they can be found at The Rec.Sport.Soccer Statistics Foundation website and in Rothmans Book of Football League Records 1888–89 to 1978–79, with home and away statistics separated.

Beginning with the season 1894–95, clubs finishing level on points were separated according to goal average (goals scored divided by goals conceded), or more properly put, goal ratio. In case one or more teams had the same goal difference, this system favoured those teams who had scored fewer goals if they had scored more than they had conceded, whereas among teams who had conceded more than they had scored the system favoured teams who scored more. The goal average system was eventually scrapped beginning with the 1976–77 season.

From the 1922–23 season, the bottom two teams of both Third Division North and Third Division South were required to apply for re-election.

== First Division ==
First Division
- Season: 1937–38
- Champions: Arsenal; 5th English title
- Relegated: Manchester City; West Bromwich Albion
- Matches: 462
- Goals: 1,430 (3.1 per match)
- Top goalscorer: Tommy Lawton (28 goals)
- Biggest home win: Wolverhampton Wanderers 10–1 Leicester City (15 April 1938)
- Biggest away win: Derby County 1–7 Manchester City (29 January 1938)
- Highest scoring: Wolverhampton Wanderers 10–1 Leicester City (15 April 1938)

Pos	Team	Pld	W	D	L	GF	GA	GAv	Pts	Relegation
1	Arsenal (C)	42	21	10	11	77	44	1.750	52	
2	Wolverhampton Wanderers	42	20	11	11	72	49	1.469	51	
3	Preston North End	42	16	17	9	64	44	1.455	49	
4	Charlton Athletic	42	16	14	12	65	51	1.275	46	
5	Middlesbrough	42	19	8	15	72	65	1.108	46	
6	Brentford	42	18	9	15	69	59	1.169	45	
7	Bolton Wanderers	42	15	15	12	64	60	1.067	45	
8	Sunderland	42	14	16	12	55	57	0.965	44	
9	Leeds United	42	14	15	13	64	69	0.928	43	
10	Chelsea	42	14	13	15	65	65	1.000	41	
11	Liverpool	42	15	11	16	65	71	0.915	41	
12	Blackpool	42	16	8	18	61	66	0.924	40	
13	Derby County	42	15	10	17	66	87	0.759	40	
14	Everton	42	16	7	19	79	75	1.053	39	
15	Huddersfield Town	42	17	5	20	55	68	0.809	39	
16	Leicester City	42	14	11	17	54	75	0.720	39	
17	Stoke City	42	13	12	17	58	59	0.983	38	
18	Birmingham	42	10	18	14	58	62	0.935	38	
19	Portsmouth	42	13	12	17	62	68	0.912	38	
20	Grimsby Town	42	13	12	17	51	68	0.750	38	
21	Manchester City (R)	42	14	8	20	80	77	1.039	36	Relegation to the Second Division
22	West Bromwich Albion (R)	42	14	8	20	74	91	0.813	36	Relegation to the Second Division

Source: World Football
Rules for classification: 1) Points; 2) Goal average; 3) Goals scored
(C) Champions; (R) Relegated

=== Results ===
Home \ Away	ARS	BIR	BLP	BOL	BRE	CHA	CHE	DER	EVE	GRI	HUD	LEE	LEI	LIV	MCI	MID	POR	PNE	STK	SUN	WBA	WOL
Arsenal		0–0	2–1	5–0	0–2	2–2	2–0	3–0	2–1	5–1	3–1	4–1	3–1	1–0	2–1	1–2	1–1	2–0	4–0	4–1	1–1	5–0
Birmingham	1–2		1–1	2–0	0–0	1–1	1–1	1–0	0–3	2–2	2–2	3–2	4–1	2–2	2–2	3–1	2–2	0–2	1–1	2–2	2–1	2–0
Blackpool	2–1	0–3		2–2	1–1	1–0	0–2	1–1	1–0	2–2	4–0	5–2	2–4	0–1	2–1	4–2	2–0	1–0	0–1	0–0	3–1	0–2
Bolton Wanderers	1–0	1–1	3–0		2–0	1–0	5–5	0–2	1–2	3–1	2–0	0–0	6–1	0–0	2–1	3–1	1–1	1–4	1–0	1–1	3–0	1–2
Brentford	3–0	1–2	2–4	1–1		5–2	1–1	2–3	3–0	6–1	2–0	1–1	1–1	1–3	2–1	3–3	2–0	2–1	0–0	4–0	0–2	2–1
Charlton Athletic	0–3	2–0	4–1	1–1	1–0		3–1	1–2	3–1	0–0	4–0	1–1	2–0	3–0	0–0	1–0	5–1	0–0	3–0	2–1	3–1	4–1
Chelsea	2–2	2–0	1–3	0–0	2–1	1–1		3–0	2–0	1–0	3–1	4–1	4–1	6–1	2–2	0–1	3–1	0–2	2–1	0–0	2–2	0–2
Derby County	2–0	0–0	3–1	4–2	1–3	3–2	4–0		2–1	1–2	0–4	2–2	0–1	4–1	1–7	1–1	1–0	1–1	4–1	2–2	5–3	1–2
Everton	1–4	1–1	3–1	4–1	3–0	3–0	4–1	1–1		3–2	1–2	1–1	3–0	1–3	4–1	2–2	5–2	3–5	3–0	3–3	5–3	0–1
Grimsby Town	2–1	4–0	1–0	0–1	0–1	1–1	2–0	0–0	2–1		4–2	1–1	2–1	0–0	3–1	2–1	1–0	1–1	1–5	0–2	1–4	1–0
Huddersfield Town	2–1	2–1	3–1	1–0	0–3	1–1	1–2	2–0	1–3	1–2		0–3	0–0	1–2	1–0	3–0	2–0	1–3	3–0	1–1	2–1	1–0
Leeds United	0–1	1–0	1–1	1–1	4–0	2–2	2–0	0–2	4–4	1–1	2–1		0–2	2–0	2–1	5–3	3–1	0–0	2–1	4–3	1–0	1–2
Leicester City	1–1	1–4	0–1	1–1	0–1	1–0	1–0	0–0	3–1	1–0	2–1	2–4		2–2	1–4	0–1	3–3	1–0	2–0	4–0	4–1	1–1
Liverpool	2–0	3–2	4–2	2–1	3–4	1–2	2–2	3–4	1–2	2–1	0–1	1–1	1–1		2–0	1–1	3–2	2–2	3–0	4–0	0–1	0–1
Manchester City	1–2	2–0	2–1	1–2	0–2	5–3	1–0	6–1	2–0	3–1	3–2	6–2	3–0	1–3		1–6	2–1	1–2	0–0	0–0	7–1	2–4
Middlesbrough	2–1	1–1	2–2	1–2	0–1	3–1	4–3	4–2	1–2	1–0	0–1	2–0	4–2	1–1	4–0		0–0	2–1	2–1	2–1	4–1	0–3
Portsmouth	0–0	1–1	1–2	1–1	4–1	2–1	2–4	4–0	3–1	3–0	3–0	4–0	1–1	1–1	2–2	0–2		3–2	2–0	1–0	2–3	1–0
Preston North End	1–3	2–1	2–0	2–2	1–1	0–1	0–0	4–1	2–1	4–1	1–1	3–1	0–0	4–1	2–2	0–2	1–1		2–1	0–0	1–1	2–0
Stoke City	1–1	2–2	1–3	3–2	3–0	2–0	2–1	8–1	1–1	1–1	0–1	0–1	1–2	2–0	3–2	3–0	3–1	1–1		0–0	4–0	1–1
Sunderland	1–1	1–0	2–1	3–1	1–0	1–1	1–1	2–0	2–0	2–2	2–1	0–0	1–0	2–3	3–1	3–1	0–2	0–2	1–1		3–0	1–0
West Bromwich Albion	0–0	4–3	1–2	2–4	4–3	0–0	4–0	4–2	3–1	2–1	5–1	2–1	1–3	5–1	1–1	3–1	1–2	1–1	0–1	1–6		2–2
Wolverhampton Wanderers	3–1	3–2	1–0	1–1	2–1	1–1	1–1	2–2	2–0	1–1	1–4	1–1	10–1	2–0	3–1	0–1	5–0	0–0	2–2	4–0	2–1	

Updated to match(es) played on unknown. Source:
Legend: Blue = home team win; Yellow = draw; Red = away team win.

=== Maps ===
Locations of the Football League First Division London teams
Locations of the Football League First Division teams

== Second Division ==
Second Division
- Season: 1937–38
- Champions: Aston Villa
- Promoted: Aston Villa; Manchester United
- Relegated: Barnsley; Stockport County
- Matches: 462
- Goals: 1,346 (2.91 per match)
- Top goalscorer: George Henson (27 goals)
- Biggest home win: Fulham 8–1 Swansea Town (22 January 1938)
- Biggest away win: Chesterfield 1–7 Manchester United (13 November 1937)
- Highest scoring: Luton Town 6–4 Stockport County (1 January 1938)

Pos	Team	Pld	W	D	L	GF	GA	GAv	Pts	Qualification or relegation
1	Aston Villa (C, P)	42	25	7	10	73	35	2.086	57	Promotion to the First Division
2	Manchester United (P)	42	22	9	11	82	50	1.640	53	Promotion to the First Division
3	Sheffield United	42	22	9	11	73	56	1.304	53	
4	Coventry City	42	20	12	10	66	45	1.467	52	
5	Tottenham Hotspur	42	19	6	17	76	54	1.407	44	
6	Burnley	42	17	10	15	54	54	1.000	44	
7	Bradford (Park Avenue)	42	17	9	16	69	56	1.232	43	
8	Fulham	42	16	11	15	61	57	1.070	43	
9	West Ham United	42	14	14	14	53	52	1.019	42	
10	Bury	42	18	5	19	63	60	1.050	41	
11	Chesterfield	42	16	9	17	63	63	1.000	41	
12	Luton Town	42	15	10	17	89	86	1.035	40	
13	Plymouth Argyle	42	14	12	16	57	65	0.877	40	
14	Norwich City	42	14	11	17	56	75	0.747	39	
15	Southampton	42	15	9	18	55	77	0.714	39	
16	Blackburn Rovers	42	14	10	18	71	80	0.888	38	
17	Sheffield Wednesday	42	14	10	18	49	56	0.875	38	
18	Swansea Town	42	13	12	17	45	73	0.616	38	
19	Newcastle United	42	14	8	20	51	58	0.879	36	
20	Nottingham Forest	42	14	8	20	47	60	0.783	36	
21	Barnsley (R)	42	11	14	17	50	64	0.781	36	Relegation to the Third Division North
22	Stockport County (R)	42	11	9	22	43	70	0.614	31	Relegation to the Third Division North

Rules for classification: 1) Points; 2) Goal average; 3) Goals scored
(C) Champions; (P) Promoted; (R) Relegated

=== Results ===
Home \ Away	AST	BAR	BLB	BPA	BUR	BRY	CHF	COV	FUL	LUT	MUN	NEW	NWC	NOT	PLY	SHU	SHW	SOU	STP	SWA	TOT	WHU
Aston Villa		3–0	2–1	2–0	0–0	2–1	0–2	1–1	2–0	4–1	3–0	2–0	2–0	1–2	3–0	1–0	4–3	3–0	7–1	4–0	2–0	2–0
Barnsley	0–1		0–0	0–1	2–2	2–2	1–1	1–1	0–0	3–1	2–2	3–0	0–0	2–2	3–2	1–1	4–1	0–2	2–0	2–0	1–1	1–0
Blackburn Rovers	1–0	5–3		0–0	3–3	2–1	3–3	1–3	2–2	2–2	1–1	2–1	5–3	5–1	2–1	2–3	1–0	4–0	3–0	3–1	2–0	2–1
Bradford Park Avenue	1–2	4–3	7–1		3–1	1–1	3–2	0–1	1–2	1–1	4–0	2–0	3–0	2–2	2–0	5–1	1–1	2–0	4–1	0–1	3–1	2–1
Burnley	3–0	1–0	3–1	1–1		2–0	0–2	2–0	1–0	3–2	1–0	2–1	3–0	0–0	0–2	2–0	1–1	4–0	0–0	2–0	2–1	2–0
Bury	1–1	0–2	2–1	5–1	4–0		4–0	0–2	4–2	3–4	1–2	1–1	3–1	2–0	2–0	1–0	2–0	2–1	1–3	0–0	1–2	4–3
Chesterfield	0–1	0–0	3–0	0–3	0–1	1–2		4–0	0–2	5–2	1–7	2–0	6–2	1–0	2–0	1–0	1–0	5–0	1–0	4–1	2–2	0–1
Coventry City	0–1	1–0	3–2	0–0	1–0	0–2	2–2		0–1	2–1	1–0	1–0	2–0	1–1	4–0	2–2	0–1	2–0	1–0	5–0	2–1	1–1
Fulham	1–1	0–0	3–1	1–1	2–1	4–0	1–1	3–4		4–1	1–0	1–2	3–4	2–0	2–3	1–1	0–0	1–0	2–0	8–1	3–1	1–1
Luton Town	3–2	4–0	4–1	4–2	3–1	0–1	1–1	1–4	4–0		1–0	4–1	1–1	2–2	1–1	2–3	2–2	1–3	6–4	5–1	2–4	2–2
Manchester United	3–1	4–1	2–1	3–1	4–0	2–0	4–1	2–2	1–0	4–2		3–0	0–0	4–3	0–0	0–1	1–0	1–2	3–1	5–1	0–1	4–0
Newcastle United	2–0	0–1	2–0	3–0	2–2	1–0	3–1	1–2	1–2	1–3	2–2		0–1	3–1	3–1	6–0	1–0	3–0	0–0	1–0	1–0	2–2
Norwich City	1–0	1–0	3–2	1–1	1–0	1–2	2–1	0–2	1–2	0–4	2–3	1–1		2–0	4–0	2–2	3–1	4–3	1–0	1–1	2–1	2–2
Nottingham Forest	0–2	2–1	3–1	1–0	1–1	1–0	4–2	2–1	0–1	1–0	2–3	0–0	1–2		1–0	2–1	0–1	2–1	1–2	2–1	3–1	0–0
Plymouth Argyle	0–3	2–2	2–2	1–0	2–3	2–1	1–1	3–1	4–0	2–4	1–1	2–1	1–1	1–0		2–0	2–4	4–0	2–1	2–2	2–2	2–1
Sheffield United	0–0	6–3	1–1	3–1	2–1	2–1	0–2	3–2	2–1	2–0	1–2	4–0	4–1	2–1	0–0		2–1	5–0	2–0	1–1	1–0	3–1
Sheffield Wednesday	1–2	0–1	1–1	1–0	2–1	2–0	1–0	2–1	2–1	4–0	1–3	3–0	1–0	0–2	1–1	0–1		0–0	3–3	1–1	0–3	1–0
Southampton	0–0	2–0	1–0	2–1	0–0	4–1	0–1	0–4	4–0	3–6	3–3	1–0	3–1	2–0	0–0	2–1	5–2		4–1	1–1	2–1	3–3
Stockport County	1–3	1–2	0–1	1–2	3–1	0–1	1–1	1–1	2–0	2–1	1–0	1–3	1–1	1–0	1–3	1–1	2–1	0–0		1–0	3–2	0–0
Swansea Town	2–1	1–0	3–2	0–1	3–1	1–0	1–0	3–3	2–0	1–1	2–2	2–0	1–0	1–0	1–0	3–5	1–1	0–0	0–2		3–2	0–0
Tottenham Hotspur	2–1	3–0	3–1	2–1	4–0	1–3	2–0	0–0	1–1	3–0	0–1	2–2	4–0	3–0	3–2	1–2	1–2	5–0	2–0	2–0		2–0
West Ham United	1–1	4–1	2–0	3–1	1–0	3–1	5–0	0–0	0–0	0–0	1–0	1–0	3–3	2–1	0–1	0–2	1–0	3–1	1–0	2–1	1–3	

Updated to match(es) played on unknown. Source: Ian Laschke: Rothmans Book of Football League Records 1888–89 to 1978–79. Macdonald and Jane’s, London & Sydney, 1980.
Legend: Blue = home team win; Yellow = draw; Red = away team win.

=== Maps ===
Locations of the Football League Second Division London teams
Locations of the Football League Second Division teams

== Third Division North ==
Football League Third Division North
- Season: 1937–1938
- Champions: Tranmere Rovers (1st title)
- Failed re-election: None
- Matches: 462
- Goals: 1,401 (3.03 per match)
- Top goalscorer: Jack Roberts (Port Vale), 28

Pos	Team	Pld	W	D	L	GF	GA	GAv	Pts	Promotion
1	Tranmere Rovers (C, P)	42	23	10	9	81	41	1.976	56	Promotion to the Second Division
2	Doncaster Rovers	42	21	12	9	74	49	1.510	54	
3	Hull City	42	20	13	9	80	43	1.860	53	
4	Oldham Athletic	42	19	13	10	67	46	1.457	51	
5	Gateshead	42	20	11	11	84	59	1.424	51	
6	Rotherham United	42	20	10	12	68	56	1.214	50	
7	Lincoln City	42	19	8	15	66	50	1.320	46	
8	Crewe Alexandra	42	18	9	15	71	53	1.340	45	
9	Chester	42	16	12	14	77	72	1.069	44	
10	Wrexham	42	16	11	15	58	63	0.921	43	
11	York City	42	16	10	16	70	68	1.029	42	
12	Carlisle United	42	15	9	18	57	67	0.851	39	
13	New Brighton	42	15	8	19	60	61	0.984	38	
14	Bradford City	42	14	10	18	66	69	0.957	38	
15	Port Vale	42	12	14	16	65	73	0.890	38	Transferred to the Third Division South
16	Southport	42	12	14	16	53	82	0.646	38	
17	Rochdale	42	13	11	18	67	78	0.859	37	
18	Halifax Town	42	12	12	18	44	66	0.667	36	
19	Darlington	42	11	10	21	54	79	0.684	32	
20	Hartlepools United	42	10	12	20	53	80	0.663	32	
21	Barrow	42	11	10	21	41	71	0.577	32	Re-elected
22	Accrington Stanley	42	11	7	24	45	75	0.600	29	Re-elected

Source: rsssf.com
(C) Champions; (P) Promoted

=== Results ===
Home \ Away	ACC	BRW	BRA	CRL	CHE	CRE	DAR	DON	GAT	HAL	HAR	HUL	LIN	NWB	OLD	PTV	ROC	ROT	SOU	TRA	WRE	YOR
Accrington Stanley		2–0	3–1	1–4	0–0	3–2	2–1	0–1	1–5	3–4	2–1	0–2	0–3	3–1	1–2	2–1	0–1	0–0	3–0	0–1	4–0	1–2
Barrow	0–0		0–0	4–2	0–2	1–0	1–1	1–1	1–3	2–1	0–0	1–0	4–1	3–0	2–1	3–0	0–1	1–0	1–2	2–2	0–1	1–2
Bradford City	2–2	1–0		4–0	2–2	3–1	2–1	2–0	1–1	3–0	4–1	1–2	2–0	3–0	1–1	5–0	3–1	3–2	1–1	1–3	2–2	0–1
Carlisle United	3–1	2–1	2–0		1–3	5–1	3–0	2–2	1–0	5–2	3–1	0–1	0–1	1–1	1–1	3–1	0–1	0–1	1–0	0–0	0–0	2–1
Chester	3–1	3–1	3–1	1–0		0–3	3–2	4–0	2–1	1–1	6–0	1–3	1–1	1–2	3–3	7–2	4–1	2–3	2–1	1–1	2–1	4–3
Crewe Alexandra	3–1	4–0	3–1	4–1	1–0		2–2	0–0	1–3	4–0	2–0	0–1	2–0	1–0	0–1	1–2	5–1	3–1	5–0	1–0	1–1	4–2
Darlington	3–0	0–1	4–2	3–1	2–1	0–1		1–1	1–2	3–0	2–0	1–3	1–4	1–0	1–0	2–2	2–4	2–1	1–1	0–2	5–3	2–2
Doncaster Rovers	5–1	1–0	4–0	1–3	2–1	0–0	4–0		1–0	2–2	3–3	2–1	3–0	3–0	1–0	3–2	5–0	0–1	3–0	1–1	2–0	2–1
Gateshead	1–0	6–0	3–0	2–1	3–1	2–0	5–2	2–3		4–1	2–1	3–2	1–1	3–1	0–0	2–1	3–1	0–0	5–0	2–1	2–2	2–2
Halifax Town	1–2	1–1	0–2	0–0	1–1	2–1	1–0	0–1	2–0		0–0	1–0	2–0	2–0	2–1	2–1	2–3	1–3	1–1	1–0	0–0	2–2
Hartlepool	2–0	1–1	1–1	4–1	0–1	2–2	2–1	0–0	1–3	2–0		2–2	2–0	1–0	2–0	2–1	3–3	4–0	1–2	2–2	2–0	0–0
Hull City	0–0	4–0	2–2	2–1	2–2	1–1	4–0	2–1	3–1	0–1	4–0		1–1	1–1	4–1	0–0	4–1	1–1	10–1	0–1	3–2	3–1
Lincoln City	2–0	5–0	4–0	0–1	1–1	3–2	0–0	2–2	3–2	2–0	2–1	2–1		4–1	0–1	1–0	2–0	5–0	1–3	0–1	7–1	2–0
New Brighton	2–1	2–1	1–1	5–1	4–0	4–0	3–0	1–2	4–1	2–0	4–1	0–0	0–1		1–0	1–1	2–0	2–3	2–2	0–1	1–1	2–1
Oldham Athletic	1–0	0–0	1–2	3–0	3–2	0–0	3–0	2–1	3–1	2–1	3–1	1–1	2–2	2–1		3–0	4–2	3–1	2–0	2–1	2–0	6–2
Port Vale	4–1	4–0	4–3	2–2	2–2	1–1	1–0	1–1	2–2	0–2	5–1	2–4	1–0	3–2	2–2		4–1	0–0	1–1	1–0	2–0	3–2
Rochdale	0–1	3–3	2–0	3–1	4–0	1–4	1–1	4–5	2–2	1–1	2–2	0–0	0–1	2–1	1–1	1–1		2–0	3–2	0–0	6–1	0–0
Rotherham United	1–1	3–0	2–1	0–1	4–1	1–0	4–2	2–2	1–1	4–1	3–1	2–2	4–0	1–2	2–1	3–2	1–0		1–1	2–1	1–1	3–0
Southport	2–1	2–0	2–0	1–1	2–2	3–1	1–1	1–3	0–0	2–2	2–0	2–1	1–1	0–0	2–2	1–0	2–0	0–3		1–3	1–2	2–3
Tranmere	5–0	3–0	2–1	5–0	0–0	2–2	1–1	2–0	4–2	2–0	4–0	3–1	2–0	5–2	1–1	2–1	3–2	0–2	7–2		3–2	1–2
Wrexham	2–0	3–2	2–1	0–0	3–1	1–0	4–0	2–0	0–0	2–0	6–3	0–1	1–0	0–1	1–0	0–0	2–1	2–0	4–1	1–3		1–1
York City	1–1	1–2	3–1	3–1	4–0	1–2	1–2	2–0	5–1	1–1	1–0	0–1	3–1	3–1	0–0	2–2	0–5	4–1	1–2	2–0	2–1	

Updated to match(es) played on unknown. Source: Ian Laschke: Rothmans Book of Football League Records 1888–89 to 1978–79. Macdonald and Jane’s, London & Sydney, 1980.
Legend: Blue = home team win; Yellow = draw; Red = away team win.

=== Maps ===
Locations of the Football League Third Division North teams

== Third Division South ==
Football League Third Division South
- Season: 1937–1938
- Champions: Millwall (2nd title)
- Failed re-election: Gillingham
- Matches: 462
- Goals: 1,264 (2.74 per match)
- Top goalscorer: Harold Crawshaw (Mansfield Town), 25

Pos	Team	Pld	W	D	L	GF	GA	GAv	Pts	Promotion or relegation
1	Millwall (C, P)	42	23	10	9	83	37	2.243	56	Promotion to the Second Division
2	Bristol City	42	21	13	8	68	40	1.700	55	
3	Queens Park Rangers	42	22	9	11	80	47	1.702	53	
4	Watford	42	21	11	10	73	43	1.698	53	
5	Brighton & Hove Albion	42	21	9	12	64	44	1.455	51	
6	Reading	42	20	11	11	71	63	1.127	51	
7	Crystal Palace	42	18	12	12	67	47	1.426	48	
8	Swindon Town	42	17	10	15	49	49	1.000	44	
9	Northampton Town	42	17	9	16	51	57	0.895	43	
10	Cardiff City	42	15	12	15	67	54	1.241	42	
11	Notts County	42	16	9	17	50	50	1.000	41	
12	Southend United	42	15	10	17	70	68	1.029	40	
13	Bournemouth & Boscombe Athletic	42	14	12	16	56	57	0.982	40	
14	Mansfield Town	42	15	9	18	62	67	0.925	39	
15	Bristol Rovers	42	13	13	16	46	61	0.754	39	
16	Newport County	42	11	16	15	43	52	0.827	38	
17	Exeter City	42	13	12	17	57	70	0.814	38	
18	Aldershot	42	15	5	22	39	59	0.661	35	
19	Clapton Orient	42	13	7	22	42	61	0.689	33	
20	Torquay United	42	9	12	21	38	73	0.521	30	
21	Walsall	42	11	7	24	52	88	0.591	29	Re-elected
22	Gillingham (R)	42	10	6	26	36	77	0.468	26	Failed re-election and demoted to the Southern League

(C) Champions; (P) Promoted; (R) Relegated

=== Results ===
Home \ Away	ALD	B&BA	B&HA	BRI	BRR	CAR	CLA	CRY	EXE	GIL	MAN	MIL	NPC	NOR	NTC	QPR	REA	STD	SWI	TOR	WAL	WAT
Aldershot		2–0	1–2	1–1	0–2	1–1	1–2	1–0	0–1	2–0	1–0	2–1	5–0	0–2	0–1	1–0	0–0	1–0	1–1	1–0	1–0	1–0
Bournemouth & Boscombe Athletic	3–0		0–0	0–0	1–3	3–0	2–0	1–0	2–2	2–0	5–4	0–3	1–1	0–0	1–1	1–1	1–1	7–1	1–2	0–0	5–0	0–0
Brighton & Hove Albion	2–1	3–1		1–1	3–0	2–1	2–1	2–1	6–0	1–0	2–0	1–0	1–0	1–2	0–1	3–1	1–1	3–1	3–1	1–1	1–0	1–2
Bristol City	3–1	2–1	1–1		0–0	0–1	2–0	0–0	4–1	3–1	2–1	0–0	0–0	1–0	3–1	2–0	1–0	4–2	1–1	2–0	3–1	3–1
Bristol Rovers	0–1	2–1	0–0	1–0		2–1	3–2	1–0	1–1	2–1	0–0	0–2	2–0	0–0	1–1	1–1	2–2	2–1	1–2	2–0	5–2	0–2
Cardiff City	0–1	3–0	4–1	0–0	1–1		2–0	4–2	1–1	4–0	4–1	3–2	3–1	4–1	2–2	2–2	4–1	5–0	2–2	5–2	3–1	1–1
Clapton Orient	2–1	3–0	0–3	0–0	1–0	1–1		0–2	2–1	3–0	1–2	2–1	0–2	1–0	2–0	1–1	1–1	1–1	1–0	2–0	2–2	1–1
Crystal Palace	1–1	0–1	3–2	1–1	3–2	1–0	1–0		2–2	3–0	4–0	0–0	3–0	0–1	3–1	4–0	3–1	2–1	0–1	4–1	3–1	4–1
Exeter City	0–1	3–1	4–0	3–2	0–0	2–1	2–0	2–2		3–5	4–0	1–5	2–0	4–1	0–3	0–4	0–2	1–1	0–0	2–0	3–2	1–2
Gillingham	2–0	0–2	1–1	1–0	0–1	1–0	1–2	2–4	2–1		0–0	2–3	1–0	2–1	2–1	1–5	1–2	2–1	0–0	1–1	3–0	0–0
Mansfield Town	2–0	3–2	1–1	3–5	1–0	3–0	3–1	2–0	2–3	3–1		1–1	1–1	4–1	1–2	3–2	5–1	2–2	2–0	1–1	3–1	0–1
Millwall	4–0	4–0	2–0	0–3	2–1	1–0	3–0	2–2	2–1	5–0	1–0		4–0	3–0	5–0	1–4	1–1	1–0	0–2	7–0	4–0	1–1
Newport County	4–0	1–1	1–0	0–0	2–2	1–1	3–1	0–0	2–2	2–0	1–0	3–1		0–0	3–0	1–1	2–2	2–0	2–0	0–2	1–2	0–0
Northampton Town	1–0	1–3	3–1	1–0	2–0	0–0	2–0	1–1	1–0	4–1	3–0	0–1	2–0		2–0	0–2	2–2	0–2	1–0	0–3	1–1	3–2
Notts County	1–0	1–2	0–3	2–0	1–1	2–0	1–0	0–1	0–0	1–0	2–0	1–1	1–1	5–0		2–2	2–1	0–2	3–0	0–0	3–1	1–2
Queens Park Rangers	3–0	1–2	2–1	0–2	4–0	2–1	3–2	1–0	4–0	2–0	1–1	0–2	0–0	1–1	2–1		3–0	1–0	3–0	6–3	3–1	2–0
Reading	3–2	4–1	2–1	0–1	4–0	0–0	2–0	3–2	1–0	2–0	3–2	1–0	2–1	4–3	0–2	1–0		3–2	2–1	1–1	2–1	4–1
Southend	4–1	1–0	2–1	5–0	1–1	3–1	1–2	2–2	1–1	2–0	0–1	1–2	0–2	4–2	2–1	2–1	4–2		0–0	5–1	1–0	2–2
Swindon Town	2–0	1–0	0–1	2–3	2–1	2–0	1–0	4–0	3–0	3–0	3–3	1–2	3–2	1–0	1–0	1–3	0–0	1–1		1–0	1–1	0–2
Torquay United	1–5	0–0	0–1	1–3	4–1	0–1	3–1	0–0	2–1	1–0	0–1	1–1	0–0	1–2	0–3	0–2	3–2	3–3	1–0		1–0	0–1
Walsall	2–0	2–0	0–3	2–8	5–2	1–0	2–0	1–1	0–2	3–1	2–0	1–1	3–1	1–1	1–0	0–3	2–5	1–5	2–3	0–0		3–1
Watford	5–1	0–2	1–1	3–1	4–0	4–0	2–0	1–2	0–0	1–1	2–0	1–1	3–0	1–3	2–0	3–1	4–0	3–1	4–0	4–0	2–1	

Updated to match(es) played on unknown. Source: Ian Laschke: Rothmans Book of Football League Records 1888–89 to 1978–79. Macdonald and Jane’s, London & Sydney, 1980.
Legend: Blue = home team win; Yellow = draw; Red = away team win.

=== Maps ===
Locations of the Football League Third Division South London teams
Locations of the Football League Third Division South teams

== Attendances ==
=== Division One ===
No.	Club	Average
1	Arsenal FC	44,045
2	Chelsea FC	33,975
3	Manchester City FC	32,670
4	Wolverhampton Wanderers FC	31,032
5	Everton FC	30,324
6	Charlton Athletic FC	28,336
7	Liverpool FC	27,682
8	Sunderland AFC	25,132
9	Bolton Wanderers FC	25,012
10	Stoke City FC	24,970
11	Birmingham City FC	24,544
12	Middlesbrough FC	24,260
13	Brentford FC	23,335
14	West Bromwich Albion FC	23,207
15	Portsmouth FC	22,827
16	Preston North End FC	22,671
17	Blackpool FC	21,264
18	Leeds United FC	21,256
19	Leicester City FC	20,402
20	Derby County FC	17,288
21	Huddersfield Town AFC	17,004
22	Grimsby Town FC	12,288

=== Division Two ===
No.	Club	Average
1	Aston Villa FC	41,950
2	Manchester United	26,633
3	Tottenham Hotspur FC	26,101
4	Coventry City FC	25,825
5	Sheffield Wednesday FC	23,124
6	West Ham United FC	23,004
7	Sheffield United FC	21,927
8	Newcastle United FC	21,276
9	Plymouth Argyle FC	18,449
10	Fulham FC	17,216
11	Southampton FC	16,583
12	Norwich City FC	16,086
13	Luton Town FC	15,836
14	Nottingham Forest FC	14,818
15	Blackburn Rovers FC	14,779
16	Stockport County FC	14,399
17	Chesterfield FC	13,871
18	Burnley FC	13,394
19	Swansea City AFC	12,015
20	Barnsley FC	11,804
21	Bradford Park Avenue AFC	11,116
22	Bury FC	10,120

== See also ==
- 1937-38 in English football
- 1937 in association football
- 1938 in association football
