= Alf Horne =

English footballer

Personal information
- Full name: Alfred Horne
- Date of birth: 1903
- Place of birth: Birmingham, England
- Date of death: April 1976 (aged 72–73)
- Height: 5 ft 8 in (1.73 m)
- Positions: Winger; inside forward; right half

Senior career*
Years	Team	Apps	(Gls)
- Alvechurch
1923–192x	West Bromwich Albion	0	(0)
192x–1925	Stafford Rangers		
1925–1927	Hull City	25	(2)
1927–1928	Southend United	30	(10)
1928–1929	Manchester City	11	(2)
1929–1932	Preston North End	40	(5)
1932–1936	Lincoln City	166	(36)
1936–1938	Mansfield Town	44	(9)
- * Club domestic league appearances and goals

Alfred Horne (1903 – April 1976) was an English professional footballer who scored 64 goals from 316 appearances in the Football League, playing for Hull City, Southend United, Manchester City, Preston North End, Lincoln City and Mansfield Town. He played as a winger or inside forward, and also played at right half in the later part of his career.

== Life and career ==
=== Early career ===
Horne was born in Birmingham. He played football for non-league club Alvechurch before joining West Bromwich Albion in 1923. After failing to break into West Brom's first team, he returned to non-League football with Birmingham League club Stafford Rangers before signing as an outside right for Second Division club Hull City in 1925.

=== Hull City ===
He made his first appearance in the Football League against South Shields on 10 October, and in his second game, two days later against Nottingham Forest, scored his first goal as well as setting up another for William Cowan in a 5–0 win. The Hull Daily Mail's pseudonymous "Veritas" thought he "appear[ed] to be as promising as anyone. Though not exactly a flier, he is not easily put out of step, and capable of giving as much as he received; he also knows when to cross a ball to the benefit of those in the centre". He was also tried at inside right, to accommodate George Richardson on the wing, but was to find himself playing as often for the reserves as for the first team. By the 1926–27 FA Cup draw with Everton, "Veritas" was suggesting that Horne had "clearly showed ... that his time is not yet", and outside-left George Martin (a future league-winner with Everton) would be better employed in his place. It was Horne's 26th and last appearance for Hull's first team, though he did help the reserves win the Midland Combination title.

=== Southend United and Manchester City ===
Horne left Hull City for Third Division South club Southend United ahead of the 1927–28 Football League season. He played the first 32 matches of the season, scoring 10 goals, and then joined Second Division promotion-chasers Manchester City as one of five forwards signed in the two weeks before the 17 March transfer deadline. Horne played in 7 of the remaining 12 matches, scoring twice, as City achieved promotion as Second Division champions. He appeared just four times in the First Division, and returned to the Second Division with Preston North End in September 1929 for a £2,000 fee.

=== Preston North End ===
At the start of the season, Preston were uncertain as to their best forward line; Horne began at inside right, from which position he scored twice against Bradford City to secure an unlikely draw, switched to inside left and back again, and only in November did they field a settled side, with Horne at outside right, and won four games out of five. As at Manchester City, Horne became an infrequent selection, finishing a three-year spell with 40 League appearances. He was transfer-listed in 1932, and signed for Lincoln City, newly promoted to the Second Division.

=== Lincoln City ===
Horne was injured early in the 6–3 win against Grimsby Town in October 1932, "completed the game in a very dazed condition, and his first question on reaching the dressing room at the end of the match was 'Have we won?'" His "return to form" in the next game contributed to a 6–0 defeat of West Ham United. Left out for a month after Phil Cartwright's return to fitness, he came back into the first team when Cartwright again sustained an injury, and played regularly for his remaining four years with the club. He finished the season with seven goals, including the opener in a 2–1 win against former club Preston, from 34 matches as Lincoln avoided relegation by three points.

Lincoln had lost top scorer Allan Hall to Tottenham Hotspur in the summer, and early in the new season, the forward line was regularly shuffled in the hope of finding a goalscoring combination. Horne played at outside right and in both inside-forward positions, and was responsible for taking penalties. He was tried at right half for the reserves with the intention of filling the first-team gap left when Bill Dodgin was moved to centre half, but injuries elsewhere meant he continued in the forward line.

With Hull City, Southend United and Preston he filled the wing and inside positions. Lincoln discovered his ability as a half-back, and last season found in him one of the best captains the club has had. Always thinks before passing, and his craft enables him to hold the ball until the right moment comes.

— Lincolnshire Echo, August 1935

Lincoln's relegation was confirmed with three matches still to play, and Horne, who had finished the season at right half, began the 1934–35 Third Division North season as established first-choice in that position. The team was much more settled in general, and Lincoln finished in fourth place; Horne and left-half George Whyte were both ever-present in 42 League and 5 FA Cup matches. He returned to the forward line during the latter part of the season. Against Accrington Stanley in March 1935, he took a ball in the face followed by a tackle which left his face bloodied, but he returned after 13 minutes' treatment and set up the only goal of the game for Tommy Robinson; two weeks later, the Daily Express dubbed him "the star of Lincoln attack" for creating two first-half goals for Robinson against Stockport County. When he resumed his right-half duties, the Lincolnshire Echo wrote that "on the team captain's recent displays one can well imagine that the management wish they could play him in two or three positions at once, but he can be relied upon to continue a dominating figure at right half."

Having missed a penalty for the first time in a League match for Lincoln, albeit in a 6–0 win, in April, he atoned at the start of the 1935–36 season with a hat-trick of penalties to beat Stockport County 3–0. He missed a month with ankle ligament damage, but came back to score 14 goals, of which 7 were from the penalty spot, and to enjoy what the Echo's review called

his best season with the club so far. As captain, whether playing at right half or inside right, he was always an inspiration to his colleagues, and was far from being a captain only in name. At home and away he always put all the energy and great skill he possesses into the game, and while some other members of the attack were sometimes but a mere shadow of themselves on opponents' grounds, he was always in the thick of the game.

=== Later career ===
He played regularly until the end of December 1936, and then joined fellow Northern Section team Mansfield Town, where he linked up again with former Lincoln manager Harry Parkes. He remained with the club as player and captain for 18 months, making 44 League appearances, and then took up the role of assistant trainer, working under manager Jack Poole.
