= Chick Reed =

English footballer (1912-1964)

Personal information
- Full name: Charles William Reed
- Date of birth: 21 March 1912
- Place of birth: Holbeach, England
- Date of death: 28 July 1964 (aged 52)
- Place of death: Spalding, England
- Height: 5 ft 8 in (1.73 m)
- Positions: Forward; left half

Senior career*
Years	Team	Apps	(Gls)
–	Little London Vics		
–	Spalding Institute		
–	Spalding United		
1930–1932	Sheffield United	2	(1)
1932–1935	Lincoln City	55	(24)
1935–1936	Southport	35	(9)
1936–1937	Chesterfield	37	(10)
1937	Spalding United		
1937–1938	Mansfield Town	22	(9)
1938–1939	Notts County	36	(2)
–	Pinchbeck		
–	Crowland		
- * Club domestic league appearances and goals

Charles William Reed (21 March 1912 – 28 July 1964), known as Chick or Charlie Reed, was an English professional footballer who scored 55 goals from 187 appearances in the Football League playing as a forward or left half for Sheffield United, Lincoln City, Southport, Chesterfield, Mansfield Town and Notts County.

== Football career ==
Reed was born in Holbeach, Lincolnshire, and played local football in the Lincolnshire area before a successful trial led to his signing for Sheffield United. He made his debut in the 1931–32 season, and scored his first goal on 19 September 1931 as Sheffield United beat Birmingham 3–1 in the Football League First Division.

After two seasons with Sheffield United, during which he played only twice in the League, Reed moved to Lincoln City, newly promoted to the Second Division. He played in only a third of Lincoln's games in his first season, and around a half in the next, nevertheless finishing as the club's leading scorer for 1933–34, though with only seven goals as the club were relegated to the Third Division North. Reed appeared regularly in 1934–35, and scored 17 goals from only 25 games – only one goal behind Johnny Campbell's tally of 18, which had come from a full season's worth of matches – before leaving the club to join Third Division rivals Southport in February 1935.

A highlight of the year Reed spent at Southport came against Hartlepools United in April 1935 when, after "picking up the ball in his own half, he ran 70 yards and shrugged off four challenges before smacking it into the net to score a memorable goal".

Reed joined Chesterfield for a fee of £800, scored on debut in a 3–1 defeat of Tranmere Rovers, and helped the club to the championship of the Third Division North and consequent promotion. He played regularly in the Second Division until January 1937, when he played his last game for the club, the third-round FA Cup defeat to Arsenal, and returned to non-League football with Spalding United.

He spent the 1937–38 season with Mansfield Town and the next season with Notts County before dropping back into Lincolnshire local football with Pinchbeck and then with Crowland.

Reed died at his home in Spalding, Lincolnshire, in 1964 at the age of 52.
