= Alfie Sams =

English footballer

Personal information
- Full name: Alfie Sams
- Date of birth: 10 November 1911
- Place of birth: Craghead, England
- Date of death: 1990 (aged 78–79)
- Position: Inside forward

Senior career*
Years	Team	Apps	(Gls)
1931	Whitby United		
1932	Shildon		
1933	Trimdon Grange		
1934	Shildon		
1935–1937	Grantham		
1937–1938	Mansfield Town	11	(2)
1938–1939	Reading	10	(0)
1939–1940	Accrington Stanley	0	(0)
1945	Grantham		
Total		21	(2)
- * Club domestic league appearances and goals

Alfie Sams (10 November 1911 – 1990) was an English professional footballer who played in the Football League for Mansfield Town and Reading.
