= Austin Morris =

English footballer

Personal information
- Full name: Austin Morris
- Date of birth: 10 February 1913
- Place of birth: Thurcroft, England
- Date of death: 1991 (aged 77–78)
- Position: Wing half

Senior career*
Years	Team	Apps	(Gls)
1936	Thurcroft Main		
1937–1938	Mansfield Town	1	(0)
1938	Gainsborough Trinity		
Total		1	(0)
- * Club domestic league appearances and goals

Austin Morris (10 February 1913 – 1991) was an English professional footballer who played in the Football League for Mansfield Town.
