= Fred Shaw (footballer) =

English footballer (1909–1994)

Personal information
- Full name: Thomas Frederick Shaw
- Date of birth: 27 March 1909
- Place of birth: Hucknall, England
- Date of death: 1994 (aged 84–85)
- Height: 5 ft 9 3/4 in (1.77 m)
- Position: Inside forward

Senior career*
Years	Team	Apps	(Gls)
- Annesley Colliery
- Darlaston
1932–1934	Birmingham	6	(0)
1934–1937	Notts County	56	(21)
1937–1938	Mansfield Town	22	(1)
1938–19??	Bournemouth & Boscombe Athletic	10	(1)
- Ollerton Colliery
- * Club domestic league appearances and goals

Thomas Frederick Shaw (27 March 1909 – 1994) was an English professional footballer who scored 23 goals in 94 appearances in the Football League playing for Birmingham, Notts County, Mansfield Town and Bournemouth & Boscombe Athletic.

Shaw was born in Hucknall, Nottinghamshire. He began his football career with Annesley Colliery and also played for Darlaston before turning professional with Birmingham in October 1932. Shaw made his debut in the First Division on 29 January 1934 in a 3–1 defeat at Blackburn Rovers. A mobile, lightweight inside forward, Shaw did not fit into Birmingham's style of play, and enjoyed greater success when he moved to Notts County. Put straight into the starting eleven for the Second Division match at home to Swansea Town, Shaw repaid his manager with a hat-trick, becoming only the second player in Notts County history to achieve the feat on his debut. After scoring 21 goals in 56 league games in two and a half seasons, Shaw spent a season with Mansfield Town and another with Bournemouth & Boscombe Athletic before returning to his native Nottinghamshire on the outbreak of the Second World War.
