= Alf Somerfield =

English footballer (1918–1985)

Personal information
- Full name: Albert Somerfield
- Date of birth: 23 March 1918
- Place of birth: South Kirkby, Yorkshire, England
- Date of death: March 1985
- Place of death: Mansfield, England
- Position: Centre forward

Senior career*
Years	Team	Apps	(Gls)
1938	Frickley Colliery		
1938–1939	Mansfield Town		
1939–1946	Wolverhampton Wanderers		
- → Ipswich Town (guest)
- → Clapton Orient (guest)
	→ Queens Park Rangers (guest)	7	(1)
1946–1947	Chelmsford City		
1947	Wrexham	2	(1)
1947–1948	Crystal Palace	10	(3)
1948–1950	Worcester City		
1950	Kidderminster Harriers		
- * Club domestic league appearances and goals

Albert 'Alf' Somerfield (23 March 1918 – March 1985) was an English professional footballer who played as a centre forward in the Football League for Crystal Palace and made guest appearances for Ipswich Town He began his career at Frickley Colliery but the outbreak of war interrupted his professional career.
