= George Rudkin =

English footballer

Personal information
- Full name: George William Rudkin
- Date of birth: 22 June 1912
- Place of birth: Spalding, England
- Date of death: 2003 (aged 90–91)
- Position: Inside forward

Senior career*
Years	Team	Apps	(Gls)
1935–1937	Grantham		
1937–1938	Mansfield Town	1	(0)
1938–1939	Carlisle United	16	(1)
1939	Boston United		
1945–1946	Chesterfield	0	(0)
Total		17	(1)
- * Club domestic league appearances and goals

George William Rudkin (22 June 1912 – 2003) was an English professional footballer who played in the Football League for Carlisle United and Mansfield Town.
