= Ernie Bell =

English footballer

Personal information
- Full name: Ernie Bell
- Date of birth: 22 July 1918
- Place of birth: Kingston upon Hull, England
- Date of death: 1968 (aged 49–50)
- Height: 5 ft 8 in (1.73 m)
- Position: Inside forward

Senior career*
Years	Team	Apps	(Gls)
1935–1936	Blundell Street Old Boys		
1936–1938	Hull City	22	(4)
1938–1939	Mansfield Town	28	(1)
1945–1946	Aldershot	0	(0)
1946–1947	Hull City	5	(1)
1947	Scarborough		
1948	Hessle Old Boys		
Total		55	(6)
- * Club domestic league appearances and goals

Ernie Bell (22 July 1918 – 1968) was an English professional footballer who played in the Football League for Hull City and Mansfield Town.
