= Joseph Hodgetts =

English footballer

Personal information
- Full name: Joseph Harold Hodgetts
- Date of birth: 2 June 1916
- Place of birth: Forest Town, England
- Date of death: 2008 (aged 101–102)
- Position: Winger

Senior career*
Years	Team	Apps	(Gls)
1935	Forest Town St Alban's		
1936	Mansfield Colliery		
1937–1938	Brighton & Hove Albion	0	(0)
1938–1939	Mansfield Town	1	(0)
1939	Ollerton Colliery		
1945	Bilsthorpe		
1946	Huthwaite CWS		
Total		1	(0)
- * Club domestic league appearances and goals

Joseph Harold Hodgetts (2 June 1916 – 2008) was an English professional footballer who played in the Football League for Mansfield Town.
