= Charlie Johnston (Scottish footballer) =

Scottish footballer

Personal information
- Full name: Charles Johnston
- Date of birth: 26 November 1911
- Place of birth: Larkhall, Scotland
- Date of death: 1991 (aged 79–80)
- Place of death: Larkhall, Scotland
- Height: 5 ft 7 in (1.70 m)
- Position: Outside left

Senior career*
Years	Team	Apps	(Gls)
- Blantyre Victoria
1932–1935	Motherwell	6	(1)
1935–1937	Doncaster Rovers	36	(3)
1937–1938	Mansfield Town	36	(4)
1938–1940	Dunfermline Athletic	23	(10)
1940–1946	Rangers	0	(0)
1946–1953	Queen of the South	165	(30)
Total		266	(48)

International career
1942	Scotland (wartime)	1	(0)
- * Club domestic league appearances and goals

Charles Johnston (26 November 1911 – 1991) was a Scottish professional footballer who played as an outside left.

== Career ==
Johnston was in the Scottish Junior Football Association setup with Blantyre Victoria before joining Motherwell in December 1932, but was rarely selected by the Steelmen before departing in 1935. He then moved on to play in the English Football League for Doncaster Rovers and Mansfield Town, before returning to Scotland to sign for Dunfermline Athletic.

His career was interrupted by World War II, during which time he moved to Rangers for a £350 fee, making over 200 appearances for the Glasgow club and winning several trophies, but these all came in unofficial competitions. As a result of his good form with the Gers, Johnston was selected to play for the Scotland national football team in an unofficial wartime international fixture against England at Wembley in 1942.

In 1946 he joined Dumfries club Queen of the South where he spent seven seasons. With the Palmerston Park club, he picked up the 1951 Scottish B Division title and played in two major domestic cup semi-finals during one of their strongest periods, playing alongside the likes of Jim Patterson, Doug McBain and Roy Henderson.
