= Albert Wilson (footballer) =

English footballer (1915–1998)

Personal information
- Full name: Albert Wilson
- Date of birth: 28 January 1915
- Place of birth: Rotherham, England
- Date of death: 1998 (aged 82–83)
- Position: Winger

Senior career*
Years	Team	Apps	(Gls)
1933–1934	Rotherham YMCA		
1934–1935	Rawmarsh Welfare		
1935–1936	Stafford Rangers		
1936–1938	Derby County	1	(0)
1938–1939	Mansfield Town	20	(2)
1939–1946	Crystal Palace	20	(6)
1946–1947	Rotherham United	38	(19)
1947–1948	Grimsby Town	17	(1)
1948–1949	Boston United		
1949–19??	Scunthorpe & Lindsey United		

Managerial career
- 1958: Rotherham United (caretaker)
- * Club domestic league appearances and goals

Albert Wilson (28 January 1915 – 1998) was an English professional footballer who played as a winger.
