= Howitt Fielding =

English footballer

Personal information
- Full name: Howitt Fielding
- Date of birth: 22 August 1914
- Place of birth: Selston, England
- Date of death: 2003 (aged 88–89)
- Height: 5 ft 9 in (1.75 m)
- Position: Winger

Senior career*
Years	Team	Apps	(Gls)
1935–1936	Ilkeston United		
1936–1937	Reading	0	(0)
1937–1938	Mansfield Town	4	(0)
1938	Peterborough United		
Total		4	(0)
- * Club domestic league appearances and goals

Howitt Fielding (22 August 1914 – 10 May 2003) was an English professional footballer who played in the Football League for Mansfield Town.
