= Alwyne Compton =

Alwyne Compton may refer to:

- Lord Alwyne Compton (bishop) (1825–1906), Bishop of Ely
- Lord Alwyne Compton (politician) (1855–1911), British politician, nephew of the above
