= Charlie Gardiner (footballer, born 1915) =

Scottish footballer (1915–1973)

Personal information
- Full name: Charles Gardiner
- Date of birth: 7 April 1915
- Place of birth: Perth, Scotland
- Date of death: 1973 (aged 57)
- Place of death: Perth, Scotland
- Height: 5 ft 6 in (1.68 m)
- Position: Inside forward

Senior career*
Years	Team	Apps	(Gls)
1933–1934	Cherrybank Boys' Club		
1934–1935	Perth Roselea		
1935–1938	Nottingham Forest	38	(8)
1938–1939	Mansfield Town	27	(4)
1939	Montrose		
Total		65	(12)
- * Club domestic league appearances and goals

Charles Gardiner (7 April 1915 – 1973) was a Scottish professional footballer who played in the Football League for Mansfield Town and Nottingham Forest.
