= Maxey Holmes =

English footballer

Personal information
- Full name: Maxey Martin Holmes
- Date of birth: 24 December 1908
- Place of birth: Pinchbeck, Lincolnshire, England
- Date of death: 1999 (aged 90–91)
- Height: 5 ft 7 1/2 in (1.71 m)
- Position: Winger

Senior career*
Years	Team	Apps	(Gls)
1930–1931	Spalding United		
1931–1935	Grimsby Town	37	(17)
1935–1937	Hull City	29	(10)
1937–1938	Mansfield Town	17	(4)
1938–1940	Lincoln City	20	(1)
- * Club domestic league appearances and goals

Maxey Martin Holmes (24 December 1908 – 1999) was an English professional footballer who played as a winger.
