= Ivan Flowers =

English footballer

Personal information
- Full name: Ivan Joseph Flowers
- Date of birth: 21 February 1919
- Place of birth: Mutford, England
- Date of death: 8 July 1944 (aged 25)
- Place of death: Normandy, German-occupied France
- Position: Inside forward

Senior career*
Years	Team	Apps	(Gls)
1936	Eastern Coach Works		
1937–1938	Wolverhampton Wanderers	0	(0)
1938–1940	Mansfield Town	7	(2)
Total		7	(2)
- * Club domestic league appearances and goals

Ivan Joseph Flowers (21 February 1919 – 8 July 1944) was an English professional footballer who played in the Football League for Mansfield Town.

== Personal life ==
Flowers served as a serjeant in the 7th Battalion, Royal Norfolk Regiment during the Second World War and was killed in Normandy on 8 July 1944. He is buried at Cambes-en-Plaine War Cemetery.
