= George Henson =

English footballer

Personal information
- Full name: George Horace Henson
- Date of birth: 25 December 1911
- Place of birth: Stony Stratford, England
- Date of death: 25 April 1988 (aged 76)
- Height: 5 ft 11 in (1.80 m)
- Position: Forward

Senior career*
Years	Team	Apps	(Gls)
- Stony Stratford Town
- Wolverton
1932–1934	Northampton Town	43	(23)
1935	Wolverhampton Wanderers	6	(1)
1936	Swansea Town	23	(5)
1937–1938	Bradford Park Avenue	60	(33)
1938–1939	Sheffield United	13	(6)
Total		145	(68)
- * Club domestic league appearances and goals

George Horace Henson (25 December 1911 – 25 April 1988) was an English footballer who played in the Football League for Bradford Park Avenue, Northampton Town, Sheffield United, Swansea Town and Wolverhampton Wanderers.

George Henson was born in Stony Stratford in Buckinghamshire on Christmas Day 1911 and from an early age his football skills were recognised. He started playing for Stony Stratford Town Football Club in the Bedfordshire League at the age of fifteen and just two years later (in August 1932) signed for Wolverton Football Club as an amateur player where he scored over 50 goals in the North Bucks League. It was here he was spotted by scouts from Northampton Town and trialled for the Cobblers. His father, King Henson, wouldn't let him sign on professionally and made him finish his apprenticeship in Wolverton Railway Works before signing professionally to Northampton Town when he was 21 years old on 11 August 1932.

== Northampton Town ==
In the 1932–33 season, George made just two appearances for Northampton Town, making his debut on 19 November 1932 in a 2–0 loss away to Crystal Palace where he played number 9. He played his second game on 6 May 1933 in another losing away game to Norwich City. George's first goal for Northampton Town came on 30 September 1933 when he made his home debut against Norwich City and scored both of the 2 goals for the Cobblers in a 2–2 draw.

Whilst playing for Northampton Town, George featured in the memorable 1933-34 Cobblers F.A. Cup run scoring the winning goal in the 1–0 win against Southampton. They then travelled away to Huddersfield who were then top of Division 1 and beat them 2–0 in one of their biggest giant killing acts before crashing out to Preston 4–0 in the 5th round in front of a crowd of over 40,000 people. A press report from the Huddersfield game has the following caption against a pen picture of George Henson "Just a boy. This is his first season as a professional footballer. Played in the local football before being bought to the Town first as an amateur and later as a pro. Has a terrific right foot shot"

In the 1934-35 Season, George played in 11 out of the first 13 League games for Northampton Town scoring 6 goals, however his goal scoring exploits had been noted by Wolverhampton Wanderers for whom he signed in November 1934.

== Wolverhampton Wanderers ==
George signed for Wolves on 9 November 1934 at the age of 22 years old, joining a team full of current internationals and unsurprisingly didn't get a chance to play for the first team that season. This came later in September 1935 when he played at home to Portsmouth. He scored just the one goal for Wolves on 13 April 1934 at home to Aston Villa in a 2–2 draw playing amongst a number of well known players, one of whom was a young man called Stan Cullis. George never really got a chance to make an impact at Wolves and in May 1936, after just a few appearances in the first team he signed a deal to move to Swansea Town.

In the Wolves Encyclopaedia, A-Z of Wolves Stars it states "George was a football nomad, tall, powerful and with a fierce shot who scored six goals in atrocious weather conditions against Blackburn Rovers in January 1938 which makes you think what he might have done had he stayed with Wolves and lined up alongside the likes of Westcott, Dorsett and company"

== Swansea Town ==
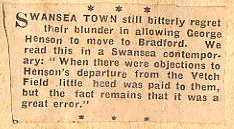

Swansea Town (now Swansea City) were in Division 2 in 1936 and George moved straight into the action making his debut in the opening game of the season against the newly relegated Aston Villa, playing in Division 2 for the first time in their history. Although Aston Villa won the game (2–1) George had the satisfaction of scoring the first ever goal conceded by Aston Villa in a lower division. George made 23 appearances for Swansea Town and score 5 League goals. Despite his reputation for being a first-class goal scorer at the start of the 1937–38 Season he was transfer-listed and signed by Bradford Park Avenue.

== Sheffield United ==
George was signed by Sheffield for the sum of £2,600 as part of their push to gain promotion to the First Division in 1939 and as cover for a number of injured players. He joined them in March 1939 and was immediately thrown into action with a game at home to Swansea Town, his old team who won 2–1 but at least George had the satisfaction of scoring the Sheffield goal.

Playing in all but one of the remaining League games he formed a good partnership with Hagan, Reid and Hampson scoring another 4 goals in 10 matches and setting up a good few more for his team-mates to score. Notable games were a 3–0 win over Bradford Park Avenue where George scored one of the goals and in the final game of the season with a win needed to secure promotion they managed a 6–1 win over Tottenham Hotspur with George scoring two of the goals taking Sheffield United up into Division 1.

Finally up into Division 1 again, George prepared for the new season with Sheffield United. The team played 3 games in the Division in 1939, beating Liverpool 2–1, drawing 0–0 at Preston and winning 1–0 at Leeds where George scored what was to be the last goal at Elland Road before the war. With war declared on 3 September 1939, the Football League was called to a halt on 2 September and so just as George was beginning to make an impact, his football career was called to a halt and we'll never know quite how much more he might have achieved.

== During and after the War ==
During the war George worked on munitions at W.H.Allen in Bedford as well as making a few guest appearances for the Cobblers and a random appearance for Watford during the war.Once hostilities ended he became player manager for Bedford Town in the Southern League for just one season before returning to where it all began as player coach for Stony Stratford Town in the South Midlands League where he helped them to promotion in their first season. He hung up his boots for good in 1951.
