= Tommy Dutton =

English footballer

Personal information
- Full name: Thomas Dutton
- Date of birth: 10 November 1906
- Place of birth: Southport, England
- Date of death: 1982 (aged 74–75)
- Height: 5 ft 10 in (1.78 m)
- Position: Inside forward

Senior career*
Years	Team	Apps	(Gls)
1928–1929	Southport High Park		
1929–1930	Southport	0	(0)
1930	Chorley		
1930	West Bromwich Albion	0	(0)
1930	Chorley		
1931–1932	Leicester City	0	(0)
1934–1935	Queens Park Rangers	23	(6)
1935–1938	Doncaster Rovers	48	(9)
1938–1939	Mansfield Town	39	(12)
1939–1940	Rochdale	0	(0)
Total		110	(27)
- * Club domestic league appearances and goals

Thomas Dutton (10 November 1906 – 1982) was an English professional footballer who played in the Football League for Doncaster Rovers, Mansfield Town and Queens Park Rangers.
