= Syd Carter =

English footballer

Personal information
- Full name: Sydney Youles Carter
- Date of birth: 28 July 1916
- Place of birth: Chesterfield, England
- Date of death: 5 September 1978 (aged 62)
- Place of death: Mansfield, England
- Position: Centre forward

Senior career*
Years	Team	Apps	(Gls)
- Bolsover Colliery
1936–1937	Sheffield United	0	(0)
1937	Wolverhampton Wanderers	0	(0)
1937–1938	Macclesfield Town	39	(40)
1938–1947	Mansfield Town	39	(10)

Managerial career
- 1955–1956: Mansfield Town (caretaker manager)
- * Club domestic league appearances and goals

Sydney Youles Carter (28 July 1916 – 5 September 1978) was an English footballer who played as a centre forward in the Football League for Mansfield Town. (Note: Hugman's 15 September 1978 date for Carter's death would appear to be a typo. The probate record lists 5 September, and the death was reported on 6 September.)

== Life and career ==
Carter was born in Chesterfield, Derbyshire, in 1916. He began his football career with Bolsover Colliery, and had spells on the books of Sheffield United and Wolverhampton Wanderers, without playing league football for either, before joining Macclesfield Town in 1937. In his only season with the club, he scored 40 goals from 39 appearances in the Cheshire League, a return that included 6 in Macclesfield's 8–4 defeat of Hurst.

He signed for Mansfield Town of the Football League Third Division North in May 1938, and established himself in the first team over the following season, but his career was disrupted by the Second World War. By the time the Football League resumed, he was 30. He returned to Mansfield and made a few more appearances in 1946–47, after which he joined the club's backroom staff, first as assistant trainer and then, in 1949, as trainer in his own right.

After Mansfield dismissed Stan Mercer on 10 October 1955 because he refused to take on secretarial duties in addition to his managerial role, Carter was appointed as caretaker manager. He held the position until Charlie Mitten's appointment in February 1956 and, according to the Football Post's "Townsman", Carter's "behind-the-scenes work as trainer and acting manager deserves to be better known. Most of the credit for the team's improvement since October belongs to him. The Stags are lucky to have a man capable of taking over the double job during the period of waiting for a player-manager."

He continued as a member of the club's backroom staff, completing 30 years' service in 1968, by which time he was Mansfield's physiotherapist, and remained on the staff until at least 1969.

Carter worked privately as a masseur after leaving Mansfield Town. He died at his Mansfield home in 1978 at the age of 62.
