= Alwyne Statham =

English footballer

Personal information
- Full name: Alwyne Statham
- Date of birth: 28 January 1920
- Place of birth: Sleaford, England
- Date of death: 2003 (aged 82–83)
- Position: Wing half

Senior career*
Years	Team	Apps	(Gls)
1937–1938	Wolverhampton Wanderers	0	(0)
1938–1939	Mansfield Town	3	(0)
Total		3	(0)
- * Club domestic league appearances and goals

Alwyne Statham (28 January 1920 – 2003) was an English professional footballer who played in the Football League for Mansfield Town as a wing half. He was born in Sleaford. His career started with Wolverhampton Wanderers before playing in the Football League for Mansfield Town.
