= Raymond O'Connor (footballer) =

English footballer

Personal information
- Full name: Francis Raymond O'Connor
- Date of birth: 28 January 1913
- Place of birth: Jarrow, County Durham, England
- Date of death: 1980 (aged 67)
- Place of death: South Shields, (Note: O'Connor's death was registered in the fourth quarter of 1980 in the South Shields registration district of County Durham, which covers nearby places such as Jarrow and Hebburn as well as South Shields itself.) County Durham, England
- Height: 5 ft 8 in (1.73 m)
- Position: Right half

Senior career*
Years	Team	Apps	(Gls)
1933–1935	Jarrow		
1935–1937	Portsmouth	0	(0)
1937–1938	Mansfield Town	18	(0)
1938–1939	Darlington	19	(0)
1939–19??	Gillingham		
- * Club domestic league appearances and goals

Francis Raymond O'Connor (28 January 1913 – q4 1980), generally known as Raymond O'Connor but also as Frank O'Connor, was an English footballer who played as a right half in the Football League for Mansfield Town and Darlington. He was on the books of Portsmouth without playing League football for them, and also played non-league football for Jarrow and Gillingham.

== Life and career ==
O'Connor was born in Jarrow, County Durham. After two seasons playing football for his hometown club, he signed for Football League First Division club Portsmouth. He stayed with the club for two seasons, and although he played regularly for their junior teams in the Southern League midweek section and the London Combination, he never appeared in the Football League. Described as "an attacking type of wing half [who] has also appeared at inside forward", he signed on a free transfer for Mansfield Town of the Third Division South in 1937.

He played regularly for Mansfield's league side in the first half of the season, helping them win the Nottinghamshire County Cup as a member of what was described as a full-strength team, and finished the campaign with 18 league appearances. Harry Parkes, who had signed him for Mansfield and then left midway through the season to manage Notts County, wanted to recruit O'Connor to his new club, but he refused the offer of terms, preferring to return to his native north-east of England and join Northern Section club Darlington. He played 19 league games during the 1938–39 season, then went south and signed for Gillingham shortly before the Southern League was abandoned for the duration of the Second World War.

O'Connor was a grandson of Alderman Terence O'Connor, who was Mayor of Jarrow in 1938. He died in 1980 at the age of 67.
