= George Stimpson =

English footballer

Personal information
- Full name: George Henry Stimpson
- Date of birth: 25 January 1910
- Place of birth: Giltbrook, England
- Date of death: 1983 (aged 72–73)
- Height: 5 ft 10 in (1.78 m)
- Position: Full back

Senior career*
Years	Team	Apps	(Gls)
1928–1929	Ainsworth United Methodists		
1929–1930	Kimberley Amateurs		
1930–1934	Notts County	90	(0)
1934–1936	Rhyl Athletic		
1936–1937	Exeter City	29	(0)
1937–1940	Mansfield Town	82	(0)
1942	Giltbrook Villa		
1945	Brinsley		
Total		201	(0)
- * Club domestic league appearances and goals

George Henry Stimpson (25 January 1910 – 1983) was an English professional footballer who played in the Football League for Exeter City, Mansfield Town and Notts County.
