= Daniel Black =

English footballer

Personal information
- Full name: Daniel Black
- Date of birth: 16 April 1911
- Place of birth: Whitehaven, England
- Date of death: 1978 (aged 66–67)
- Height: 6 ft 3 in (1.91 m)
- Position: Goalkeeper

Senior career*
Years	Team	Apps	(Gls)
1932–1933	Kells		
1933–1935	Carlisle United	21	(0)
1935	Rotherham United	0	(0)
1935–1938	Mansfield Town	46	(0)
1938	Peterborough United		
Total		67	(0)
- * Club domestic league appearances and goals

Daniel Black (16 April 1911 – May 1978) was an English professional footballer who played in the Football League for Carlisle United and Mansfield Town.
