= Lloyd Barke =

English footballer

Personal information
- Full name: John Lloyd Barke
- Date of birth: 16 December 1916
- Place of birth: Kirkby-in-Ashfield, England
- Date of death: 1976 (aged 68–69)
- Height: 5 ft 10 1/2 in (1.79 m)
- Position: Central defender

Senior career*
Years	Team	Apps	(Gls)
1929–1930	Annesley Colliery		
1930–1931	Chesterfield	0	(0)
1931–1932	East Kirkby Colliery Welfare		
1932–1933	Bleakhall United		
1933–1934	Scunthorpe & Lindsey United		
1934–1937	Sheffield United	6	(0)
1937–1947	Mansfield Town	114	(0)
1947–1950	Denaby United		
1950–1951	Sutton Town		
1951–1952	Heanor Town		
1952–1953	Ilkeston Town		
1953	Belper Town		
Total		120	(0)

Managerial career
- 1944–1945: Mansfield Town
- * Club domestic league appearances and goals

John Lloyd Barke (16 December 1916 – 1976) was an English professional footballer who played in the Football League for Mansfield Town and Sheffield United.
