= Fred Speed =

English footballer

Personal information
- Full name: Frederick Speed
- Date of birth: 1909
- Place of birth: Newcastle upon Tyne, England
- Height: 5 ft 8 1/2 in (1.74 m)
- Position: Left half

Senior career*
Years	Team	Apps	(Gls)
	Newark Town	?	(?)
1930–1934	Hull City	49	(15)
1934–1936	York City	79	(15)
1936–1939	Mansfield Town	100	(6)
1939	Exeter City	2	(0)
- * Club domestic league appearances and goals

Frederick Speed (born 1909) was an English footballer. He was born in Newcastle upon Tyne, England.

== Career ==
Speed joined Hull City from Newark Town in 1930. After making 49 appearances and scoring 15 goals in the league for Hull, he joined York City in 1934. He was the club's top scorer for the 1935–36 season with 13 goals. After making 83 appearances and scoring 16 goals for York, he joined Mansfield Town in 1936. He joined Exeter City in 1939 after making 100 appearances and scoring six goals in the league for Mansfield. He made two appearances in the league for Exeter.
