= William Patterson (footballer) =

Scottish footballer

Personal information
- Full name: William Patterson
- Date of birth: 4 March 1914
- Place of birth: Hamilton, South Lanarkshire, Scotland
- Position: Central defender

Senior career*
Years	Team	Apps	(Gls)
1929	Quarter United		
1930	Denny Hibernian		
1931	Morton		
1932	Ballymena		
1933	Belfast Celtic		
1933	Distillery		
1933	East Fife		
1933	Broadway United		
1934	Dundee		
1934	Arbroath		
1935	Raith Rovers		
1936	Stenhousemuir		
1936–1937	Lincoln City	2	(0)
1937–1939	Mansfield Town	61	(0)
Total		63	(0)
- * Club domestic league appearances and goals

William Patterson (4 March 1914 – unknown) was a Scottish professional footballer who played in the Football League for Lincoln City and Mansfield Town.
