= Reg Bungay =

English footballer

Personal information
- Full name: Reginald Harold Bungay
- Date of birth: 5 February 1911
- Place of birth: Reading, England
- Date of death: 1986 (aged 74–75)
- Place of death: Reading, England
- Height: 5 ft 9 in (1.75 m)
- Positions: Left back; centre forward

Youth career
- –1931: Huntley & Palmers

Senior career*
Years	Team	Apps	(Gls)
1931–1932	Oxford City		
1932–1933	Tottenham Hotspur	0	(0)
1933–1935	Plymouth Argyle	3	(0)
1935–1936	Bristol City	8	(3)
1936–1939	Mansfield Town	87	(5)
1939–1940	Clapton Orient	0	(0)
Total		98	(8)
- * Club domestic league appearances and goals

Reginald Harold Bungay (5 February 1911 – 1986) was an English professional footballer who played in the Football League for Bristol City, Mansfield Town and Plymouth Argyle as a left back.

== Career statistics ==
Appearances and goals by club, season and competition
Club	Season	League			FA Cup		Total	
Club	Season	Division	Apps	Goals	Apps	Goals	Apps	Goals
Plymouth Argyle	1933–34	Second Division	2	0	0	0	2	0
Plymouth Argyle	1934–35	Second Division	1	0	0	0	1	0
Career total			3	0	0	0	3	0
