= John Iorwerth Hughes =

Welsh footballer

Personal information
- Date of birth: 29 January 1913
- Place of birth: Rhosllanerchrugog, Wales
- Date of death: 26 September 1993 (aged 80)
- Place of death: Harrowden, England
- Height: 5 ft 9 in (1.75 m)
- Position: Goalkeeper

Senior career*
Years	Team	Apps	(Gls)
- Plas Bennion
- Llanerch Colts
- Aberystwyth Town
- Afongoch
- Druids
- Llanerch Colts
- Rhos
- Dick, Kerr's XI
1932–1937	Blackburn Rovers	47	(0)
1937–1938	Mansfield Town	76	(0)
- Nelson
- Bacup Borough
- Rossendale United
- Darwen
- Third Lanark

International career
1935	Wales	1	(0)
- * Club domestic league appearances and goals

John Iorwerth Hughes (1913 – 1993) was a Welsh footballer who played professionally in England and Scotland. He played one game for the Wales national football team.

== Playing career ==
=== Club career ===
Born in Rhosllanerchrugog, Hughes played for various Welsh clubs until 1932, when he joined Blackburn Rovers. Over the next five years he made 47 appearances in the Football League First Division. In 1937 he joined Mansfield Town, where he made 76 League appearances. After the Second World War he played for a number of non-League teams in the Lancashire area before moving to Scotland to play for Third Lanark.

=== International career ===
Hughes gained one cap for the Welsh national team, on 27 March 1935 against Ireland.

== See also ==
- List of Wales international footballers (alphabetical)
