= John Turner (footballer, born 1913) =

English footballer

Personal information
- Full name: John Kipling Turner
- Date of birth: 20 May 1913
- Place of birth: Doncaster, England
- Date of death: 1979 (aged 71–72)
- Position: Winger

Senior career*
Years	Team	Apps	(Gls)
1933	Worksop Town		
1934	Northern Rubber Works (Retford)		
1935–1937	Leeds United	14	(0)
1937–1939	Mansfield Town	58	(9)
1939–1940	Bristol City	0	(0)
Total		72	(9)
- * Club domestic league appearances and goals

John Kipling Turner (20 May 1913 – 1979) was an English professional footballer who played in the Football League as a winger for Leeds United and Mansfield Town.
