= John Poole (footballer, born 1892) =

English footballer and manager

Personal information
- Full name: John Smith Poole
- Date of birth: 1892
- Place of birth: Codnor, England
- Date of death: 23 March 1967 (aged 74)
- Place of death: Whitwell, England
- Height: 5 ft 10 in (1.78 m)
- Position: Centre half

Senior career*
Years	Team	Apps	(Gls)
- Sutton United (Notts)
- Sutton Junction
1914–1919	Nottingham Forest	0	(0)
1919–1924	Sunderland	144	(1)
1924–1930	Bradford City	97	(0)

Managerial career
- 1938–1944: Mansfield Town
- * Club domestic league appearances and goals as of 15:12, 7 December 2011 (UTC)

John Smith Poole (1892–1967) was an English footballer who played for Sunderland and Bradford City, who later became a trainer of the latter. He was born in Codnor. After retiring from playing he had a lengthy spell as manager of Mansfield Town.

== Career ==
Poole played for Sutton United (Notts) and Sutton Junction before signing for Nottingham Forest, but he failed to break into their first team. With the outbreak of World War I he began appearing as a guest player for Sheffield United. After the war he signed for Sunderland where he made his Football League début before finishing his playing career at Bradford City.

== Managerial career ==
After retiring from playing he became coach at Bradford before becoming manager of Mansfield Town.
