= Harold Crawshaw =

English footballer

Personal information
- Date of birth: 18 February 1912
- Place of birth: Prestwich, England
- Date of death: 1971 (aged 58–59)
- Position: Forward

Senior career*
Years	Team	Apps	(Gls)
- Newton Heath Loco
- Ashington
1936–1937	Portsmouth	1	(0)
1937–1938	Mansfield Town	41	(25)
1938–1939	Nottingham Forest	22	(9)
Total		64	(34)
- * Club domestic league appearances and goals

Harold Crawshaw (18 February 1912 – 1971) was an English footballer who played in the Football League for Mansfield Town, Nottingham Forest and Portsmouth.
