= 1952–53 Mansfield Town F.C. season =

Mansfield Town
1952–53 season
- Manager: George Jobey
- Stadium: Field Mill
- Third Division North: 18th
- FA Cup: Third round

The 1952–53 season was Mansfield Town's 15th season in the Football League and tenth season in the Third Division North, they finished in 18th position with 46 points.

== Final league table ==
Pos	Team	Pld	W	D	L	GF	GA	GAv	Pts
16	Bradford City	46	14	18	14	75	80	0.938	46
17	Hartlepools United	46	16	14	16	57	61	0.934	46
18	Mansfield Town	46	16	14	16	55	62	0.887	46
19	Barrow	46	16	12	18	66	71	0.930	44
20	Chester	46	11	15	20	64	85	0.753	37

Source: rsssf.com

== Results ==
=== Football League Third Division North ===
Match	Date	Opponent	Venue	Result	Attendance	Scorers
1	23 August 1952	Chesterfield	A	1–4	18,506	Reeve
2	25 August 1952	Gateshead	H	2–0	12,685	Reeve, Coole
3	30 August 1952	Tranmere Rovers	H	1–0	12,129	Marron
4	1 September 1952	Gateshead	A	2–1	5,388	Marron (2)
5	6 September 1952	York City	A	0–2	8,645	
6	8 September 1952	Workington	H	0–0	9,951	
7	13 September 1952	Grimsby Town	H	1–1	12,980	Evans
8	17 September 1952	Workington	A	1–0	6,479	Fox
9	20 September 1952	Barrow	A	0–3	5,964	
10	25 September 1952	Scunthorpe & Lindsey United	A	1–0	7,252	Adam
11	27 September 1952	Wrexham	H	0–2	8,007	
12	29 September 1952	Darlington	H	3–2	4,589	Adam, Evans, Marron
13	4 October 1952	Bradford Park Avenue	A	1–1	9,623	Marron
14	11 October 1952	Hartlepools United	A	0–2	8,554	
15	18 October 1952	Carlisle United	H	2–1	7,500	S Watson, Fox
16	25 October 1952	Southport	A	3–1	5,685	Marron, Reeve, Adam
17	1 November 1952	Crewe Alexandra	H	3–0	7,348	Marron (2), Coole
18	8 November 1952	Port Vale	A	1–1	14,103	Adam
19	15 November 1952	Chester	H	2–2	6,390	Marron, Chessell
20	29 November 1952	Stockport County	H	2–2	4,956	Marron (2)
21	13 December 1952	Rochdale	H	2–1	6,211	Marron, Scott
22	20 December 1952	Chesterfield	H	1–4	6,802	Scott
23	26 December 1952	Oldham Athletic	A	0–1	26,194	
24	27 December 1952	Oldham Athletic	H	0–2	12,200	
25	1 January 1953	Darlington	A	1–2	4,045	Fox
26	3 January 1953	Tranmere Rovers	A	0–1	8,844	
27	17 January 1953	York City	H	1–1	6,960	Lewis
28	24 January 1953	Grimsby Town	A	1–5	13,890	Chessell
29	31 January 1953	Accrington Stanley	A	2–2	3,274	Marron, Brocklehurst (o.g.)
30	7 February 1953	Barrow	H	2–2	5,298	Marron, Reeve
31	14 February 1953	Wrexham	A	0–1	6,647	
32	21 February 1953	Bradford Park Avenue	H	1–1	6,219	Evans
33	28 February 1953	Hartlepools United	H	2–0	6,720	Reeve, Chessell
34	7 March 1953	Carlisle United	A	0–1	8,309	
35	14 March 1953	Southport	H	2–2	6,661	Reeve, Evans
36	21 March 1953	Crewe Alexandra	A	0–1	5,802	
37	28 March 1953	Port Vale	H	1–0	6,083	V Watson
38	4 April 1953	Chester	A	2–2	5,082	V Watson, Reeve
39	6 April 1953	Halifax Town	A	2–1	5,794	V Watson, Fox
40	7 April 1953	Halifax Town	H	2–1	7,953	V Watson, Marron
41	11 April 1953	Scunthorpe & Lindsey United	H	1–0	7,310	Reeve
42	13 April 1953	Accrington Stanley	H	0–0	5,465	
43	18 April 1953	Stockport County	A	2–2	6,503	Marron, Coole
44	20 April 1953	Bradford City	A	1–2	8,165	Reeve
45	25 April 1953	Bradford City	H	3–1	6,230	Reeve, Fox, V Watson
46	29 April 1953	Rochdale	A	0–1	4,282	

=== FA Cup ===
Round	Date	Opponent	Venue	Result	Attendance	Scorers
R1	22 November 1952	Scarborough	A	8–0	6,536	Adam (2), Marron (2), Fox (3), S Watson
R2	6 December 1952	Accrington Stanley	A	2–0	8,606	Adam, Fox
R3	10 January 1953	Nottingham Forest	H	0–1	24,467	

== Squad statistics ==
- Squad list sourced from 1952–53 Mansfield Town F.C. season at the English National Football Archive (subscription required)

Pos.	Name	League		FA Cup		Total	
Pos.	Name	Apps	Goals	Apps	Goals	Apps	Goals
GK	(England) Arthur Bramley	17	0	2	0	19	0
GK	(England) Dennis Wright	29	0	1	0	30	0
DF	(England) Don Bradley	32	0	3	0	35	0
DF	(England) Sammy Chessell	45	3	3	0	48	3
DF	(England) Gordon Livie	5	0	0	0	5	0
DF	(England) Les Mayfield	6	0	0	0	6	0
DF	(England) Norman Plummer	45	0	3	0	48	0
DF	(England) Gordon Revel	1	0	0	0	1	0
MF	(England) Eddie Barks	28	0	1	0	29	0
MF	(England) Norman Field	16	0	2	0	18	0
MF	(England) Oscar Fox	38	5	3	4	41	9
MF	(England) Jack Lewis	28	1	3	0	31	1
MF	(England) Sid Watson	30	1	3	1	33	2
FW	(Scotland) Charlie Adam	40	4	3	3	43	7
FW	(England) Billy Coole	35	3	1	0	36	3
FW	(England) Joe Eaton	2	0	0	0	2	0
FW	(England) Ray Evans	15	4	0	0	15	4
FW	(England) Eddie Hawksford	1	0	0	0	1	0
FW	(England) Chris Marron	39	16	3	2	42	18
FW	(England) Ken Reeve	32	10	0	0	32	10
FW	(England) Ken Scott	5	2	2	0	7	2
FW	(England) George Simpson	5	0	0	0	5	0
FW	(England) Vaughan Watson	10	5	0	0	10	5
FW	(England) Vince Wright	2	0	0	0	2	0
–	Own goals	–	1	–	0	–	1
