= 1954–55 Mansfield Town F.C. season =

Mansfield Town
1954–55 season
- Manager: Stan Mercer
- Stadium: Field Mill
- Third Division North: 13th
- FA Cup: First Round
Home colours

The 1954–55 season was Mansfield Town's 17th season in the Football League and 12th season in the Third Division North, they finished in 13th position with 45 points.

== Final league table ==
Pos	Team	Pld	W	D	L	GF	GA	GAv	Pts
11	Southport	46	16	16	14	47	44	1.068	48
12	Rochdale	46	17	14	15	69	66	1.045	48
13	Mansfield Town	46	18	9	19	65	71	0.915	45
14	Halifax Town	46	15	13	18	63	67	0.940	43
15	Darlington	46	14	14	18	62	73	0.849	42

Source: rsssf.com

== Results ==
=== Football League Third Division North ===
Match	Date	Opponent	Venue	Result	Attendance	Scorers
1	21 August 1954	Barrow	H	0–5	12,494	
2	25 August 1954	Crewe Alexandra	A	1–2	6,773	Gaskell
3	28 August 1954	Workington	A	2–2	8,850	Gaskell, Daley
4	30 August 1954	Crewe Alexandra	H	4–2	10,270	Gaskell, Daley (2), Fox
5	4 September 1954	Chesterfield	H	2–0	16,759	Daley, Fox
6	8 September 1954	Halifax Town	A	2–1	5,899	Adam, Murray
7	11 September 1954	Accrington Stanley	H	2–2	9,766	Daley, Murray
8	13 September 1954	Halifax Town	H	2–1	9,564	Murray (2)
9	18 September 1954	Wrexham	A	3–1	9,197	Adam, Gaskell, Bradley
10	22 September 1954	Bradford City	A	0–1	8,621	
11	25 September 1954	Scunthorpe & Lindsey United	H	2–1	11,809	Daley, Fox
12	27 September 1954	Bradford City	H	1–0	8,264	Adam
13	2 October 1954	Barnsley	A	0–1	14,234	
14	9 October 1954	Carlisle United	A	2–1	6,158	Daley, Hill (o.g.)
15	16 October 1954	Chester	H	2–1	9,464	Murray (2)
16	23 October 1954	Grimsby Town	A	2–3	7,359	Gaskell (2)
17	30 October 1954	Bradford Park Avenue	H	2–1	9,221	Gaskell, Daley
18	6 November 1954	Rochdale	A	0–2	6,527	
19	13 November 1954	Tranmere Rovers	H	3–1	6,980	Daley, Gaskell, Kieran (o.g.)
20	27 November 1954	Hartlepools United	H	0–2	7,855	
21	4 December 1954	Gateshead	A	0–4	3,774	
22	18 December 1954	Barrow	A	2–2	3,398	Adam, Darwin
23	25 December 1954	York City	A	1–3	10,272	Darwin
24	27 December 1954	York City	H	1–2	9,752	Darwin
25	1 January 1955	Workington	H	2–0	6,746	Murray, Vitty (o.g.)
26	8 January 1955	Oldham Athletic	A	1–1	9,575	Hudson
27	22 January 1955	Accrington Stanley	A	2–3	8,527	Darwin, Daley
28	29 January 1955	Oldham Athletic	H	1–3	6,838	Darwin
29	5 February 1955	Wrexham	H	2–1	4,980	Murray (2)
30	12 February 1955	Scunthorpe & Lindsey United	A	0–2	7,132	
31	19 February 1955	Barnsley	H	1–1	4,020	Adam
32	26 February 1955	Carlisle United	H	1–1	4,070	Watson
33	5 March 1955	Chester	A	0–1	4,864	
34	12 March 1955	Grimsby Town	H	3–0	6,250	Adam, Darwin, Jepson
35	19 March 1955	Bradford Park Avenue	A	0–0	5,527	
36	26 March 1955	Rochdale	H	3–2	2,561	Darwin, Adam (2)
37	30 March 1955	Chesterfield	A	1–4	6,712	Darwin
38	2 April 1955	Tranmere Rovers	A	1–2	3,388	Adam (2)
39	8 April 1955	Southport	A	0–1	4,087	
40	9 April 1955	Stockport County	H	0–0	6,387	
41	11 April 1955	Southport	H	3–0	5,170	Adam, Gaskell, Murray
42	16 April 1955	Hartlepools United	A	2–1	7,404	Gaskell, Murray
43	18 April 1955	Darlington	H	3–1	4,889	Murray (2), Daley
44	23 April 1955	Gateshead	H	0–1	4,334	
45	25 April 1955	Stockport County	A	2–2	4,368	Daley, Fox
46	30 April 1955	Darlington	A	1–3	4,603	Gaskell

=== FA Cup ===
Round	Date	Opponent	Venue	Result	Attendance	Scorers
R1	20 November 1954	Bradford City	A	1–3	9,314	Adam

== Squad statistics ==
- Squad list sourced from 1954–55 Mansfield Town F.C. season at the English National Football Archive (subscription required)

Pos.	Name	League		FA Cup		Total	
Pos.	Name	Apps	Goals	Apps	Goals	Apps	Goals
GK	(Scotland) Willie White	3	0	0	0	3	0
GK	(England) Dennis Wright	43	0	1	0	44	0
DF	(England) Don Bradley	43	1	1	0	44	1
DF	(England) Eric Goodwin	8	0	0	0	8	0
DF	(England) Brian Lambert	1	0	0	0	1	0
DF	(Scotland) Roger McDonald	6	0	0	0	6	0
DF	(Scotland) Willie McGregor	39	0	1	0	40	0
DF	(England) Norman Plummer	38	0	1	0	39	0
DF	(England) Eric Ryan	2	0	0	0	2	0
DF	(England) Reg Warner	7	0	0	0	7	0
MF	(England) Frank Allen	2	0	0	0	2	0
MF	(England) Eddie Barks	23	0	1	0	24	0
MF	(England) Oscar Fox	41	4	1	0	42	4
MF	(England) Sid Watson	39	1	1	0	40	1
FW	(Scotland) Charlie Adam	17	0	0	0	17	0
FW	(Scotland) Jimmy Adam	39	10	1	1	40	11
FW	(England) Alan Daley	41	12	1	0	42	12
FW	(England) George Darwin	28	8	1	0	29	8
FW	(England) Alec Gaskell	29	11	1	0	30	11
FW	(Wales) Billy Hudson	8	1	0	0	8	1
FW	(England) Barry Jepson	8	1	0	0	8	1
FW	(England) Ken Murray	37	13	0	0	37	13
FW	(Scotland) Jimmy Wilson	4	0	0	0	4	0
–	Own goals	–	3	–	0	–	3
