= 1953–54 Mansfield Town F.C. season =

Mansfield Town
1953–54 season
- Manager: Stan Mercer
- Stadium: Field Mill
- Third Division North: 7th
- FA Cup: First Round

The 1953–54 season was Mansfield Town's 16th season in the Football League and 11th season in the Third Division North, they finished in 7th position with 51 points.

== Final league table ==
Pos	Team	Pld	W	D	L	GF	GA	GAv	Pts
5	Bradford City	46	22	9	15	60	55	1.091	53
6	Chesterfield	46	19	14	13	76	64	1.188	52
7	Mansfield Town	46	20	11	15	88	67	1.313	51
8	Wrexham	46	21	9	16	81	68	1.191	51
9	Bradford (Park Avenue)	46	18	14	14	77	68	1.132	50

Source: rsssf.com

== Results ==
=== Football League Third Division North ===
Match	Date	Opponent	Venue	Result	Attendance	Scorers
1	19 August 1953	Port Vale	H	1–2	10,410	Marron
2	22 August 1953	Tranmere Rovers	A	5–2	7,917	Plummer, Adam, Reeve (2), Murray
3	26 August 1953	Bradford City	A	2–2	9,873	Plummer, Reeve
4	29 August 1953	Halifax Town	H	3–1	6,888	Plummer, Murray, Reeve
5	31 August 1953	Bradford City	H	0–0	8,879	
6	5 September 1953	Carlisle United	A	0–5	8,482	
7	12 September 1953	Accrington Stanley	H	1–1	7,627	Murray
8	14 September 1953	Chesterfield	H	2–2	11,185	Murray (2)
9	19 September 1953	Grimsby Town	A	2–0	9,929	Adam, Marron
10	21 September 1953	Barrow	A	2–4	3,617	Murray, Reeve
11	26 September 1953	Stockport County	H	3–1	8,610	Murray, Plummer, Coole
12	28 September 1953	Barrow	H	2–3	6,590	Murray, Marron
13	3 October 1953	Rochdale	A	0–1	7,483	
14	10 October 1953	Southport	H	4–2	7,926	Murray (2), Bradley
15	17 October 1953	York City	A	1–5	6,294	Murray
16	24 October 1953	Scunthorpe & Lindsey United	H	2–1	8,539	Bradley, Marron
17	31 October 1953	Workington	A	1–1	6,570	Reeve
18	7 November 1953	Gateshead	H	1–1	7,355	Watson
19	14 November 1953	Hartlepools United	A	1–3	7,128	Daley
20	28 November 1953	Barnsley	A	1–2	9,241	Daley
21	5 December 1953	Bradford Park Avenue	H	1–1	5,493	Murray
22	12 December 1953	Darlington	H	6–0	5,655	Murray (2), Darwin (2), Daley, Reeve
23	19 December 1953	Tranmere Rovers	H	2–0	6,102	Darwin, Reeve
24	25 December 1953	Crewe Alexandra	H	6–0	6,092	Darwin (2), Reeve (2), Plummer, Daley
25	26 December 1953	Crewe Alexandra	A	0–0	4,648	
26	1 January 1954	Chesterfield	A	0–0	12,259	
27	2 January 1954	Halifax Town	A	0–2	4,965	
28	9 January 1954	Chester	H	2–1	6,572	Reeve, Darwin
29	16 January 1954	Carlisle United	H	2–1	6,386	Daley, Darwin
30	23 January 1954	Accrington Stanley	A	1–5	5,617	Darwin
31	6 February 1954	Grimsby Town	H	5–1	6,513	Darwin, Fox, Murray (3)
32	13 February 1954	Stockport County	A	2–3	6,371	Darwin (2)
33	20 February 1954	Rochdale	H	2–0	8,234	Daley, Darwin
34	27 February 1954	Southport	A	1–2	3,377	Darwin
35	6 March 1954	York City	H	7–2	6,783	Darwin (2), Daley, Fox, Murray, Watson (2)
36	13 March 1954	Scunthorpe & Lindsey United	A	2–2	6,516	Murray, Watson
37	20 March 1954	Workington	H	0–2	8,059	
38	24 March 1954	Chester	A	2–0	1,667	Marron, Daley
39	27 March 1954	Gateshead	A	3–1	4,678	Marron (2), Murray
40	3 April 1954	Hartlepools United	H	1–0	5,948	Eaton
41	5 April 1954	Port Vale	A	1–1	13,060	Daley
42	10 April 1954	Darlington	A	2–1	3,392	Daley, Murray
43	16 April 1954	Wrexham	A	0–2	10,268	
44	17 April 1954	Barnsley	H	2–0	10,031	Marron (2)
45	19 April 1954	Wrexham	H	4–0	8,984	Daley (2), Darwin (2)
46	24 April 1954	Bradford Park Avenue	A	0–1	5,437	

=== FA Cup ===
Round	Date	Opponent	Venue	Result	Attendance	Scorers
R1	21 November 1953	Hartlepools United	A	1–1	11,779	S Watson
R1 Replay	25 November 1953	Hartlepools United	H	0–3	6,237	

== Squad statistics ==
- Squad list sourced from 1953–54 Mansfield Town F.C. season at the English National Football Archive (subscription required)

Pos.	Name	League		FA Cup		Total	
Pos.	Name	Apps	Goals	Apps	Goals	Apps	Goals
GK	(England) Dennis Wright	46	0	2	0	48	0
DF	(England) Don Bradley	32	3	2	0	34	3
DF	(England) Sammy Chessell	16	0	1	0	17	0
DF	(England) Eric Goodwin	1	0	0	0	1	0
DF	(England) Gordon Livie	16	0	0	0	16	0
DF	(Scotland) Willie McGregor	42	0	2	0	44	0
DF	(England) Norman Plummer	45	5	2	0	47	5
MF	(England) Frank Allen	4	0	0	0	4	0
MF	(England) Eddie Barks	33	0	1	0	34	0
MF	(England) Oscar Fox	38	2	2	0	40	2
MF	(England) Sid Watson	39	0	2	1	41	1
FW	(Scotland) Charlie Adam	36	2	2	0	38	2
FW	(England) Billy Coole	12	1	0	0	12	1
FW	(Scotland) John Cuthbertson	3	0	0	0	3	0
FW	(England) Alan Daley	29	12	0	0	29	12
FW	(England) George Darwin	26	17	2	0	28	17
FW	(England) Joe Eaton	2	1	0	0	2	1
FW	(England) John Heather	1	0	0	0	1	0
FW	(England) Barry Jepson	2	0	0	0	2	0
FW	(England) James Lill	2	0	0	0	2	0
FW	(England) Chris Marron	14	9	0	0	14	9
FW	(England) Ken Murray	40	21	2	0	42	21
FW	(England) Ken Reeve	19	11	0	0	19	11
FW	(England) George Simpson	3	0	0	0	3	0
FW	(England) Dennis Sinclair	1	0	0	0	1	0
FW	(England) Vaughan Watson	4	4	2	0	6	4
