= 1955–56 Mansfield Town F.C. season =

Mansfield Town
1955–56 season
- Manager: Stan Mercer; Charlie Mitten
- Stadium: Field Mill
- Third Division North: 18th
- FA Cup: Second Round

The 1955–56 season was Mansfield Town's 18th season in the Football League and 13th season in the Third Division North, they finished in 18th position with 39 points.

== Final league table ==
Pos	Team	Pld	W	D	L	GF	GA	GAv	Pts
16	Tranmere Rovers	46	16	9	21	59	84	0.702	41
17	Chester	46	13	14	19	52	82	0.634	40
18	Mansfield Town	46	14	11	21	84	81	1.037	39
19	Halifax Town	46	14	11	21	66	76	0.868	39
20	Oldham Athletic	46	10	18	18	76	86	0.884	38

Source: rsssf.com

== Results ==
=== Football League Third Division North ===
Match	Date	Opponent	Venue	Result	Attendance	Scorers
1	20 August 1955	Derby County	A	0–4	24,159	
2	22 August 1955	Scunthorpe & Lindsey United	H	3–2	9,729	Fox, Murray (2)
3	27 August 1955	Crewe Alexandra	H	1–1	6,964	Daley
4	31 August 1955	Scunthorpe & Lindsey United	A	0–3	8,923	
5	3 September 1955	Hartlepools United	A	2–4	7,714	Lee, Gaskell
6	5 September 1955	Oldham Athletic	H	2–0	5,643	Gaskell (2)
7	10 September 1955	Stockport County	H	2–2	7,104	Gaskell, Murray
8	12 September 1955	Oldham Athletic	A	1–1	5,417	Watkin
9	17 September 1955	Barrow	A	1–4	6,126	Watkin
10	19 September 1955	Workington	H	0–0	6,028	
11	24 September 1955	Wrexham	A	0–2	7,513	
12	26 September 1955	Bradford City	H	0–0	5,338	
13	1 October 1955	Halifax Town	H	3–1	5,638	Gaskell, Watkin, Griffiths (o.g.)
14	8 October 1955	Darlington	H	3–3	5,609	Gaskell, Darwin, Murray
15	15 October 1955	Chester	A	3–4	7,709	Darwin, Wilson, Watkin
16	22 October 1955	Southport	H	0–1	5,563	
17	29 October 1955	Tranmere Rovers	A	0–1	3,987	
18	5 November 1955	Chesterfield	H	0–1	8,375	
19	12 November 1955	Rochdale	A	1–1	4,660	Jepson
20	26 November 1955	Grimsby Town	A	0–2	12,572	
21	3 December 1955	Carlisle United	H	0–1	6,047	
22	17 December 1955	Derby County	H	1–1	9,017	Watkin
23	24 December 1955	Crewe Alexandra	A	1–2	3,018	Darwin
24	26 December 1955	York City	H	3–1	6,296	Darwin (2), Murray
25	27 December 1955	York City	A	1–1	14,209	Fox
26	31 December 1955	Hartlepools United	H	5–1	7,294	Jepson (2), Darwin (3)
27	14 January 1956	Stockport County	A	2–7	5,619	Jepson, Darwin
28	21 January 1956	Barrow	H	4–0	5,423	Jepson, Darwin (2), Daley
29	28 January 1956	Gateshead	A	0–3	3,701	
30	4 February 1956	Wrexham	H	6–1	5,072	Darwin (3), Jepson (2), Wynn (o.g.)
31	11 February 1956	Halifax Town	A	1–1	5,229	Murray
32	18 February 1956	Darlington	A	1–3	3,104	Jepson
33	25 February 1956	Chester	H	3–0	7,693	Jepson (2), Darwin
34	3 March 1956	Southport	A	1–1	6,827	Murray
35	10 March 1956	Tranmere Rovers	H	6–0	8,591	Murray (2), Jepson (2), Darwin, Steele (o.g.)
36	17 March 1956	Bradford Park Avenue	A	3–0	5,912	Murray, Darwin, Batty (o.g.)
37	24 March 1956	Rochdale	H	6–0	8,563	Murray (3), Darwin, Jepson, Mitten
38	30 March 1956	Accrington Stanley	H	3–2	17,331	Murray, Jepson, Mitten
39	31 March 1956	Chesterfield	A	1–2	15,138	Jepson
40	2 April 1956	Accrington Stanley	A	1–3	8,179	Jepson, Lee
41	7 April 1956	Grimsby Town	H	0–2	15,562	
42	9 April 1956	Bradford Park Avenue	H	5–0	6,382	Jepson (3), Murray, Darwin
43	12 April 1956	Carlisle United	A	2–5	4,145	Jepson, Mitten
44	21 April 1956	Gateshead	H	3–1	7,348	Jepson (2), Murray
45	25 April 1956	Bradford City	A	2–4	3,672	Jepson, Murray
46	28 April 1956	Workington	A	1–2	4,833	Bradley

=== FA Cup ===
Round	Date	Opponent	Venue	Result	Attendance	Scorers
R1	19 November 1955	Stockport County	H	2–0	8,072	Jepson, Watkin
R2	10 December 1955	York City	A	1–2	13,326	Darwin

== Squad statistics ==
- Squad list sourced from 1955–56 Mansfield Town F.C. season at the English National Football Archive (subscription required)

Pos.	Name	League		FA Cup		Total	
Pos.	Name	Apps	Goals	Apps	Goals	Apps	Goals
GK	(England) Dennis Wright	46	0	2	0	48	0
DF	(England) Don Bradley	29	1	1	0	30	1
DF	(England) Brian Lambert	6	0	0	0	6	0
DF	(Scotland) Roger McDonald	7	0	0	0	7	0
DF	(Scotland) Willie McGregor	38	0	2	0	40	0
DF	(England) Norman Plummer	38	0	2	0	40	0
DF	(England) Eric Ryan	17	0	1	0	18	0
DF	(England) Jim Stainton	3	0	0	0	3	0
DF	(England) Reg Warner	20	0	0	0	20	0
MF	(England) Oscar Fox	37	2	2	0	39	2
MF	(England) Sid Watson	42	1	2	0	44	1
FW	(England) Alan Daley	27	2	2	0	29	2
FW	(England) George Darwin	37	19	2	1	39	20
FW	(England) Alec Gaskell	13	6	0	0	13	6
FW	(England) Barry Jepson	26	22	1	1	27	23
FW	(England) Harry Lee	3	2	0	0	3	2
FW	(England) James Lill	1	0	0	0	1	0
FW	(England) Billy Linacre	13	0	2	0	15	0
FW	(England) Charlie Mitten	17	3	0	0	17	3
FW	(England) Ken Murray	38	17	1	0	39	17
FW	(England) Dave Smith	8	0	0	0	8	0
FW	(England) Billy Watkin	25	4	2	1	27	5
FW	(Scotland) Jimmy Wilson	15	1	0	0	15	1
–	Own goals	–	4	–	0	–	4
