= 1951–52 Mansfield Town F.C. season =

Mansfield Town
1951–52 season
- Manager: Freddie Steele; George Jobey
- Stadium: Field Mill
- Third Division North: 6th
- FA Cup: First round
Home colours

The 1951–52 season was Mansfield Town's 14th season in the Football League and tenth season in the Third Division North, they finished in 6th position with 52 points.

== Final league table ==
Pos	Team	Pld	W	D	L	GF	GA	GAv	Pts
4	Oldham Athletic	46	24	9	13	90	61	1.475	57
5	Gateshead	46	21	11	14	66	49	1.347	53
6	Mansfield Town	46	22	8	16	73	60	1.217	52
7	Carlisle United	46	19	13	14	62	57	1.088	51
8	Bradford (Park Avenue)	46	19	12	15	74	64	1.156	50

Source: rsssf.com

== Results ==
=== Football League Third Division North ===
Match	Date	Opponent	Venue	Result	Attendance	Scorers
1	18 August 1951	Stockport County	H	1–0	10,753	Donaldson
2	22 August 1951	Accrington Stanley	A	0–1	8,614	
3	25 August 1951	Workington	A	1–0	6,770	Geddes
4	27 August 1951	Accrington Stanley	H	3–0	10,520	Coole, Lewis, Reeve
5	1 September 1951	Barrow	H	2–1	10,609	Coole, Lewis
6	4 September 1951	Rochdale	A	0–1	6,046	
7	8 September 1951	Grimsby Town	A	1–1	17,361	Steele
8	15 September 1951	Wrexham	H	3–0	8,547	Reeve, Ottewell (2)
9	17 September 1951	Rochdale	H	1–1	10,413	Ottewell
10	22 September 1951	Chesterfield	A	1–1	17,446	Steele
11	29 September 1951	Bradford Park Avenue	H	1–0	11,567	Geddes
12	6 October 1951	Bradford City	H	2–1	11,712	Steele, Fox
13	13 October 1951	York City	A	0–3	7,577	
14	20 October 1951	Chester	H	3–1	9,550	Steele, Donaldson (2)
15	27 October 1951	Lincoln City	A	2–1	16,364	Steele, Coole
16	3 November 1951	Scunthorpe & Lindsey United	H	4–1	10,301	Steele (2), Fox, Reeve
17	10 November 1951	Tranmere Rovers	A	1–1	8,215	Fox
18	17 November 1951	Southport	H	4–0	10,172	Fox, Donaldson, Reeve (2)
19	1 December 1951	Gateshead	H	2–3	10,712	Fox, Wyles (o.g.)
20	8 December 1951	Darlington	A	1–2	3,024	Donaldson
21	15 December 1951	Stockport County	A	1–2	10,212	Lewis
22	22 December 1951	Workington	H	3–2	6,127	Donaldson, Fox, Evans
23	25 December 1951	Hartlepools United	A	0–2	10,524	
24	26 December 1951	Hartlepools United	H	0–1	9,185	
25	29 December 1951	Barrow	A	1–1	7,585	Reeve
26	5 January 1952	Grimsby Town	H	2–2	9,471	Donaldson, Fox
27	12 January 1952	Carlisle United	H	1–2	8,497	Lewis
28	19 January 1952	Wrexham	A	1–3	7,917	Evans
29	26 January 1952	Chesterfield	H	2–1	10,411	Reeve, Coole
30	2 February 1952	Carlisle United	A	0–0	8,946	
31	9 February 1952	Bradford Park Avenue	A	1–0	10,516	Donaldson
32	16 February 1952	Bradford City	A	1–2	11,676	Reeve
33	23 February 1952	Oldham Athletic	H	2–1	9,623	Donaldson, Fox
34	1 March 1952	York City	H	1–1	7,953	Reeve
35	8 March 1952	Chester	A	5–1	5,133	Reeve (2), Evans (3)
36	15 March 1952	Lincoln City	H	1–0	19,043	Reeve
37	22 March 1952	Scunthorpe & Lindsey United	A	1–4	7,552	Reeve
38	29 March 1952	Tranmere Rovers	H	3–0	3,194	Reeve, Evans, Fox
39	5 April 1952	Southport	A	1–0	2,630	Evans
40	12 April 1952	Crewe Alexandra	H	2–1	8,136	Fox, Reeve
41	14 April 1952	Halifax Town	A	0–1	5,901	
42	15 April 1952	Halifax Town	H	4–2	8,214	Evans, Reeve (3)
43	19 April 1952	Gateshead	A	1–4	3,501	Reeve
44	23 April 1952	Crewe Alexandra	A	0–1	3,825	
45	26 April 1952	Darlington	H	3–2	5,941	Reeve (2), Coole
46	3 May 1952	Oldham Athletic	A	3–5	5,593	Coole, Barks, Watson

=== FA Cup ===
Round	Date	Opponent	Venue	Result	Attendance	Scorers
R1	24 November 1951	Stockton	A	1–1	10,000	Lewis
R1 Replay	28 November 1951	Stockton	H	0–2	5,229	

== Squad statistics ==
- Squad list sourced from 1951–52 Mansfield Town F.C. season at the English National Football Archive (subscription required)

Pos.	Name	League		FA Cup		Total	
Pos.	Name	Apps	Goals	Apps	Goals	Apps	Goals
GK	(England) Dennis Wright	46	0	2	0	48	0
DF	(England) Don Bradley	46	0	2	0	48	0
DF	(England) Sammy Chessell	24	0	2	0	26	0
DF	(Scotland) Johnny Grogan	42	0	2	0	44	0
DF	(England) Les Mayfield	23	0	0	0	23	0
MF	(England) Eddie Barks	45	1	2	0	47	1
MF	(England) Norman Field	4	0	0	0	4	0
MF	(England) Oscar Fox	43	10	2	0	45	10
MF	(Scotland) Andy Geddes	11	2	0	0	11	2
MF	(England) Jack Lewis	46	4	2	1	48	5
MF	(England) Sid Watson	21	1	0	0	21	1
FW	(England) Billy Coole	37	6	2	0	39	6
FW	(Scotland) Willie Donaldson	30	9	2	0	32	9
FW	(England) Ray Evans	23	8	0	0	23	8
FW	(England) Sid Ottewell	16	3	1	0	17	3
FW	(England) Ken Reeve	37	21	2	0	39	21
FW	(England) Freddie Steele	12	7	1	0	13	7
–	Own goals	–	1	–	0	–	1
