= 1950–51 Mansfield Town F.C. season =

Mansfield Town
1950–51 season
- Manager: Freddie Steele
- Stadium: Field Mill
- Third Division North: 2nd
- FA Cup: Fifth Round

The 1950–51 season was Mansfield Town's 13th season in the Football League and ninth season in the Third Division North, they finished in 2nd position with 64 points.

== Final league table ==
Pos	Team	Pld	W	D	L	GF	GA	GAv	Pts	Promotion or relegation
1	Rotherham United (C, P)	46	31	9	6	103	41	2.512	71	Promotion to the Second Division
2	Mansfield Town	46	26	12	8	78	48	1.625	64	
3	Carlisle United	46	25	12	9	79	50	1.580	62	
4	Tranmere Rovers	46	24	11	11	83	62	1.339	59	
5	Lincoln City	46	25	8	13	89	58	1.534	58	

Source: rsssf.com
(C) Champions; (P) Promoted

== Results ==
=== Football League Third Division North ===
Match	Date	Opponent	Venue	Result	Attendance	Scorers
1	19 August 1950	Wrexham	A	2–2	13,015	Godwin, Ottewell
2	21 August 1950	Darlington	H	2–1	14,307	Barks, Ottewell
3	26 August 1950	Scunthorpe & Lindsey United	H	1–1	11,513	Coole
4	30 August 1950	Darlington	A	2–1	7,334	Ottewell, Steele
5	2 September 1950	Lincoln City	H	1–1	13,111	Lewis
6	2 September 1950	Bradford Park Avenue	H	3–2	13,447	Lewis, Ottewell, Steele
7	9 September 1950	Rotherham United	A	0–3	13,113	
8	13 September 1950	Bradford Park Avenue	A	0–1	11,174	
9	16 September 1950	Barrow	H	4–0	8,929	Steele (2), Coole, Bradley
10	23 September 1950	York City	A	1–1	9,273	Coole
11	30 September 1950	Carlisle United	H	2–1	6,686	Steele (2)
12	7 October 1950	Crewe Alexandra	A	0–2	8,743	
13	14 October 1950	New Brighton	H	4–0	10,464	Ottewell, Steele, Coole, Galbraith (o.g.)
14	21 October 1950	Hartlepools United	A	1–1	8,524	Ottewell
15	28 October 1950	Gateshead	H	2–1	13,349	Ottewell, Coole
16	4 November 1950	Stockport County	A	1–3	12,297	Ottewell
17	11 November 1950	Halifax Town	H	3–1	9,744	Coole, Steele (2)
18	18 November 1950	Bradford City	A	3–2	13,999	Coole, Steele, Donaldson
19	2 December 1950	Chester	A	1–0	3,963	Coole
20	23 December 1950	Scunthorpe & Lindsey United	A	0–0	7,459	
21	25 December 1950	Oldham Athletic	A	0–2	12,227	
22	26 December 1950	Oldham Athletic	H	3–1	10,254	Reeve, Lewis, Whyte (o.g.)
23	30 December 1950	Lincoln City	A	0–3	7,904	
24	10 January 1951	Tranmere Rovers	H	2–1	5,414	Steele, Reeve
25	13 January 1951	Rotherham United	H	1–1	18,241	Reeve
26	20 January 1951	Barrow	A	3–2	4,861	Reeve (2), Coole
27	3 February 1951	York City	H	3–1	10,347	Steele, Coole, Ottewell
28	17 February 1951	Carlisle United	A	0–2	10,734	
29	24 February 1951	Crewe Alexandra	H	4–1	9,227	Reeve, Steele, Ottewell (2)
30	3 March 1951	New Brighton	A	1–0	3,347	Fox
31	3 March 1951	Tranmere Rovers	A	1–2	4,426	Antonio
32	10 March 1951	Hartlepools United	H	1–0	7,282	Steele
33	17 March 1951	Gateshead	A	2–1	4,342	Reeve, Ottewell (2)
34	23 March 1951	Accrington Stanley	H	5–0	4,504	Reeve, Barks, Coole (2), Fox
35	24 March 1951	Stockport County	H	2–1	10,219	Reeve, Ottewell
36	26 March 1951	Accrington Stanley	A	2–0	3,602	Barks, Ottewell
37	31 March 1951	Halifax Town	A	1–0	5,537	Coole
38	7 April 1951	Bradford City	H	1–1	9,387	Ottewell
39	10 April 1951	Southport	A	1–0	3,712	Coole
40	14 April 1951	Rochdale	A	0–0	4,000	
41	16 April 1951	Rochdale	H	1–0	11,384	Reeve
42	21 April 1951	Chester	H	2–1	10,239	Coole, Fox
43	23 April 1951	Wrexham	H	1–1	12,018	Tunney (o.g.)
44	28 April 1951	Shrewsbury Town	A	1–1	10,132	Lewis
45	30 April 1951	Shrewsbury Town	H	4–0	7,590	Coole, Reeve, Fox (2)
46	5 May 1951	Southport	H	2–2	8,360	Lewis, Reeve

=== FA Cup ===
Round	Date	Opponent	Venue	Result	Attendance	Scorers
R1	25 November 1950	Walthamstow Avenue	H	1–0	11,784	Steele
R2	9 December 1950	Chelmsford City	A	4–1	11,500	Coole, Barks, Donaldson (2)
R3	6 January 1951	Swansea Town	H	2–0	16,564	Steele (2)
R4	27 January 1951	Sheffield United	A	0–0	48,696	
R4 Replay	31 January 1951	Sheffield United	H	2–1	20,374	Steele, Ottewell
R5	10 February 1951	Blackpool	A	0–2	33,108	

== Squad statistics ==
- Squad list sourced from 1950–51 Mansfield Town F.C. season at the English National Football Archive (subscription required)

Pos.	Name	League		FA Cup		Total	
Pos.	Name	Apps	Goals	Apps	Goals	Apps	Goals
GK	(England) Arthur Bramley	1	0	0	0	1	0
GK	(England) Dennis Wright	45	0	6	0	51	0
DF	(England) Don Bradley	42	1	6	0	48	1
DF	(England) Sammy Chessell	46	0	6	0	52	0
DF	(Scotland) Johnny Grogan	46	0	6	0	52	0
DF	(England) Les Mayfield	4	0	0	0	4	0
DF	(England) Cyril Poole	7	0	0	0	7	0
MF	(England) Eddie Barks	36	3	5	1	41	4
MF	(England) Oscar Fox	34	5	0	0	34	5
MF	(England) Jack Lewis	46	5	6	0	52	5
FW	(England) George Antonio	38	1	6	0	44	1
FW	(England) Billy Coole	44	16	6	1	50	17
FW	(Scotland) Willie Donaldson	22	1	3	2	25	3
FW	(England) Verdi Godwin	14	2	0	0	14	2
FW	(England) Sid Ottewell	38	15	6	1	44	16
FW	(England) Ken Reeve	24	12	4	0	28	14
FW	(England) Freddie Steele	19	14	6	4	25	18
–	Own goals	–	3	–	0	–	3
