= 1949–50 Mansfield Town F.C. season =

Mansfield Town
1949–50 season
- Manager: Freddie Steele
- Stadium: Field Mill
- Third Division North: 8th
- FA Cup: Second Round

The 1949–50 season was Mansfield Town's 12th season in the Football League and eighth season in the Third Division North, they finished in 8th position with 48 points.

== Final league table ==
Pos	Team	Pld	W	D	L	GF	GA	GAv	Pts
6	Rotherham United	42	19	10	13	80	59	1.356	48
7	Crewe Alexandra	42	17	14	11	68	55	1.236	48
8	Mansfield Town	42	18	12	12	66	54	1.222	48
9	Carlisle United	42	16	15	11	68	51	1.333	47
10	Stockport County	42	19	7	16	55	52	1.058	45

Source: rsssf.com

== Results ==
=== Football League Third Division North ===
Match	Date	Opponent	Venue	Result	Attendance	Scorers
1	20 August 1949	Southport	A	1–1	10,182	Reeve
2	24 August 1949	Accrington Stanley	A	2–2	8,712	Steele (2)
3	27 August 1949	Carlisle United	H	4–1	15,165	Steele (2), Oscroft (2)
4	29 August 1949	Accrington Stanley	H	2–0	15,454	Steele, Coole
5	3 September 1949	Rotherham United	A	2–2	14,794	Steele, Coole
6	5 September 1949	York City	A	3–3	8,563	McCarter, Poole, Oscroft
7	10 September 1949	Lincoln City	H	2–1	16,813	Steele, Oscroft
8	12 September 1949	York City	H	1–0	14,914	Oscroft
9	17 September 1949	Barrow	A	1–0	8,021	Coole
10	24 September 1949	Crewe Alexandra	H	3–0	17,116	Coole, Reeve, McCarter
11	1 October 1949	Tranmere Rovers	A	1–2	11,136	Coole
12	8 October 1949	Stockport County	A	0–1	15,885	
13	15 October 1949	Doncaster Rovers	H	1–2	19,446	Oscroft
14	22 October 1949	Gateshead	A	1–0	11,157	Steele
15	29 October 1949	Hartlepools United	H	7–1	13,166	Steele (3), Oscroft (3), Coole
16	5 November 1949	Darlington	A	2–2	9,594	Steele, Oscroft
17	12 November 1949	New Brighton	H	2–2	11,419	Steele, Oscroft
18	19 November 1949	Halifax Town	A	3–0	7,213	Steele (2), Oscroft
19	3 December 1949	Bradford City	A	1–2	14,613	Coole
20	17 December 1949	Southport	H	1–2	7,447	McCarter
21	24 December 1949	Carlisle United	A	1–1	12,495	McCarter
22	26 December 1949	Oldham Athletic	H	3–1	14,823	McCarter, Reeve (2)
23	27 December 1949	Oldham Athletic	A	0–1	22,512	
24	31 December 1949	Rotherham United	H	0–2	15,352	
25	14 January 1950	Lincoln City	A	0–1	15,018	
26	21 January 1950	Barrow	H	1–1	11,185	Godwin
27	28 January 1950	Rochdale	H	1–1	11,492	Godwin
28	4 February 1950	Crewe Alexandra	A	1–1	9,433	McCarter
29	11 February 1950	Chester	H	0–2	9,630	
30	18 February 1950	Tranmere Rovers	H	1–1	9,301	Steele
31	25 February 1950	Halifax Town	H	1–0	5,746	Ottewell
32	4 March 1950	Rochdale	A	1–7	6,336	Antonio
33	11 March 1950	Gateshead	H	1–0	8,530	Steele
34	18 March 1950	Hartlepools United	A	3–1	5,555	Reeve, Godwin
35	25 March 1950	Darlington	H	2–1	8,547	Steele, Godwin
36	1 April 1950	New Brighton	A	2–1	4,122	Reeve, Godwin
37	7 April 1950	Wrexham	H	1–0	10,026	Reeve
38	8 April 1950	Stockport County	H	3–0	9,153	Godwin, Ottewell (2)
39	10 April 1950	Wrexham	A	0–0	4,932	
40	15 April 1950	Doncaster Rovers	A	1–0	19,567	Reeve
41	22 April 1950	Bradford City	H	0–2	9,915	
42	29 April 1950	Chester	A	3–6	2,215	Coole, Lewis, Lee (o.g.)

=== FA Cup ===
Round	Date	Opponent	Venue	Result	Attendance	Scorers
R1	26 November 1949	Walsall	H	4–1	15,398	Oscroft, Antonio, Coole (2)
R2	10 December 1949	Doncaster Rovers	A	0–1	22,569	

== Squad statistics ==
- Squad list sourced from 1949–50 Mansfield Town F.C. season at the English National Football Archive (subscription required)

Pos.	Name	League		FA Cup		Total	
Pos.	Name	Apps	Goals	Apps	Goals	Apps	Goals
GK	(England) Arthur Bramley	1	0	0	0	1	0
GK	(England) Dennis Wright	41	0	2	0	43	0
MF	(England) Eddie Barks	32	0	2	0	34	0
DF	(England) Don Bradley	36	0	2	0	38	0
DF	(England) Sammy Chessell	32	0	2	0	34	0
DF	(England) Walter Fox	8	0	0	0	8	0
DF	(Scotland) Johnny Grogan	37	0	2	0	39	0
DF	(England) Les Mayfield	1	0	0	0	1	0
DF	(England) Cyril Poole	9	1	0	0	9	1
MF	(England) Charlie Croft	7	0	0	0	7	0
MF	(England) Ray Devey	1	0	0	0	1	0
MF	(England) Jack Lewis	39	1	2	0	41	1
FW	(England) George Antonio	29	1	2	1	31	2
FW	(England) Billy Coole	41	8	2	2	43	10
FW	(England) Roy Cooling	3	0	0	0	3	0
FW	(England) Ray Evans	1	0	0	0	1	0
FW	(England) Verdi Godwin	17	7	0	0	17	7
FW	(Scotland) Jim McCarter	41	6	2	0	43	6
FW	(England) Harry Oscroft	23	12	2	0	25	12
FW	(England) Sid Ottewell	13	3	0	0	13	3
FW	(England) Ken Reeve	27	8	0	0	27	8
FW	(England) Freddie Steele	22	18	2	1	24	19
FW	(England) Billy Wheatley	1	0	0	0	1	0
–	Own goals	–	1	–	0	–	1
