= Geoffrey Hill (disambiguation) =

Sir Geoffrey Hill (1932–2016) was an English poet.

Geoffrey or Geoff Hill may also refer to:

- Geoffrey T. R. Hill (1895–1955), British aviator and aeronautical engineer
- Geoffrey Hill (cricketer, born 1934) (1934–2012), English cricketer
- Geoffrey Hill (cricketer, born 1837) (1837–1891), English cricketer and British Army officer.
- Geoff Hill (Northern Ireland journalist) (born 1956), author, journalist and long-distance motorcycle rider
- Geoff Hill (South African journalist) (born 1956), journalist and author working in London, Nairobi and Johannesburg
- Geoff Hill (Australian footballer) (1936–1982), Australian rules footballer
- Geoff Hill (footballer, born 1929) (1929–2006), English footballer
- Geoff Hill (mountaineer) (1941–1967), Australian mountaineer
- Geoff Hill (wrestler), English wrestler

== See also ==
- Geoffrey Hills, mountain range in Antarctica
