= Oscar Fox =

Oscar Fox may refer to:

- Oscar Fox Sr. (1892–1946), English footballer for Bradford City
- Oscar Fox Jr. (1921–1990), his son, English footballer for Sheffield Wednesday and Mansfield Town
