= Mount Currie =

Mount Currie may refer to:

- Mount Currie (British Columbia), the northernmost summit of the Garibaldi Ranges in British Columbia
  - Mount Currie, British Columbia, a rural community near Pemberton, British Columbia, named for the summit
  - Mount Currie Indian Band, a band government of the Lil'wat (Lower St'at'imc) people at Mount Currie, British Columbia
- Mount Currie (Alberta), a mountain in Alberta, Canada
- Mount Currie (Antarctica), a mountain in Antarctica
- Mount Currie (Australia), a mountain in the Northern Territory of Australia
- Mount Currie (South Africa), a summit near Kokstad
