= Mount Merrick =

Mount Merrick may refer to:

- Mount Merrick (Antarctica)
- Mount Merrick (Australia)
- Mount Merrick (British Columbia)
