= Dick Peaks =

Mountains in Antarctica

The Dick Peaks (67°40′S 49°36′E) are a group of peaks 1 nautical mile (2 km) east of Mount Humble at the east end of the Raggatt Mountains, Enderby Land. They were plotted from air photos taken from Australian National Antarctic Research Expeditions aircraft in 1956, and were named after W. Dick, a weather observer at Mawson Station in 1960. It has frequently been noted on lists of unusual place names.
