= Wyles =

Wyles may refer to:

- Chris Wyles (born 1983), International rugby union player
- Harry Wyles (1922–1982), English footballer
- Lilian Wyles (1885–1975), British police officer
