= Bill Hudson =

Bill Hudson may refer to:

- Bill Hudson (Alaska politician) (born 1932), American politician
- Bill Hudson (alpine skier) (born 1966), American alpine skier
- Bill Hudson (American football) (1935–2017), American football defensive tackle
- Bill Hudson (British Army officer) (1910–1995), British Special Operations Executive officer
- Bill Hudson (footballer) (1920–1945), Australian rules footballer
- Bill Hudson (guitarist) (born 1988), heavy metal guitarist
- Bill Hudson (ice hockey) (1910–1988), ice hockey player
- Bill Hudson (photographer) (1932–2010), American photojournalist
- Bill Hudson (rugby league), English rugby league footballer
- Bill Hudson (singer) (born 1949), musician in Hudson Brothers
- Billy Hudson (1938–2022), American politician

== See also ==
- William Hudson (disambiguation)
