= Andrew Geddes =

Andrew Geddes is the name of:

- Andrew Geddes Bain (1797–1864), South African geologist, road engineer, palaeontologist and explorer
- Andrew Geddes (artist) (1783–1844), Scottish artist
- Andy Geddes (footballer, born 1922), Scottish footballer
- Andy Geddes (footballer, born 1959), Scottish footballer
- Andrew James Wray Geddes (1906–1988), British RAF officer

== See also ==
- Andrew Geddis (1886–1976), businessman and sports enthusiast in Bombay
