= William Hudson =

William Hudson may refer to:

== Science and medicine ==
- William Hudson (botanist) (1730–1793), British botanist
- William Hudson (engineer) (1896–1978), New Zealand-born head of Snowy Mountains Scheme in Australia
- William Henry Hudson (1841–1922), Anglo-Argentine writer and naturalist

== Sports ==
- Bill Hudson (rugby league), rugby league footballer of the 1940s and 1950s for Great Britain, Yorkshire, England, Batley, Wigan, and Wakefield Trinity
- William Hudson (baseball) (1903–???), American baseball pitcher in the 1930s
- William Hudson (footballer) (1928–2014), British footballer
- Willie Hudson (William Henry Hudson), American baseball player in the 1940s
- William Rodney Hudson, American football player

== Others ==
- William Hudson (actor) (1919–1974), American actor
- William L. Hudson (1794–1862), United States Navy officer
- William Parker Hudson (1841–1912), Ontario businessman and political figure
- William Wilson Hudson (1808–1859), president of the University of Missouri
- William Hudson (1664–1742), mayor of Philadelphia, 1725–1726
- Private William Hudson, a character in the 1986 film Aliens, played by Bill Paxton

== See also ==
- Bill Hudson (disambiguation)
- Will Hudson (disambiguation)
