= Norman Field =

Norman Field may refer to:

- Norman Field (rugby league)
- Norman Field (footballer)
