= Mount Dyke =

Mountain in Enderby Land, Antarctica

Mount Dyke (67°35′S 49°25′E) is a mountain, 1,100 metres (3,600 ft) high, standing 3 nautical miles (6 km) north of Mount Humble in the northeast part of the Raggatt Mountains. It was plotted from air photos taken by Australian National Antarctic Research Expeditions in 1956, and was named by the Antarctic Names Committee of Australia for Flying Officer Graeme Dyke, a Royal Australian Air Force pilot at Mawson Station in 1960.
