= Thyer Glacier =

Glacier in Antarctica

Tyer Glacier
- Location within Antarctica
- Type: tributary
- Location: Enderby Land
- Coordinates: 67°43′S 48°45′E
- Thickness: unknown
- Terminus: Rayner Glacier
- Status: unknown

Thyer Glacier (67°43′S 48°45′E) is a tributary glacier, flowing northwest along the south side of the Raggatt Mountains to enter the Rayner Glacier. Mapped from ANARE (Australian National Antarctic Research Expeditions) air photos taken by the RAAF flight in 1956. Named by Antarctic Names Committee of Australia (ANCA) for R.F. Thyer, chief geophysicist, Bureau of Mineral Resources, Australian Department of National Development and Energy.

== See also ==
- List of glaciers in the Antarctic
- Glaciology
