= Mount Currie (Antarctica) =

Mountain in Antarctica

Mount Currie (67°42′S 49°12′E) is a mountain, 1,110 m, between Mount Maslen and Mount Merrick in the Raggatt Mountains, Enderby Land. Plotted from air photos taken from ANARE (Australian National Antarctic Research Expeditions) aircraft in 1956 and 1957. Named by Antarctic Names Committee of Australia (ANCA) for G.J. Currie, radio supervisor at Mawson Station in 1960.
