= Mount Bergin =

Mountain in Enderby Land, Antarctica

- Location within Antarctica

Highest point
- Elevation: 700 m (2,300 ft)

Naming
- Etymology: R.D. Bergin, radio officer at Mawson Station

Geography
- Continent: Antarctica
- Area: Enderby Land
- Range coordinates: 67°42′S 48°55′E
- Parent range: Raggatt Mountains

Mount Bergin (67°42′S 48°55′E) is a mountain, 700 m (2,300 ft), standing 4 nautical miles (7.4 km) west of Mount Maslen in the Raggatt Mountains, Enderby Land. It was plotted from air photos taken from ANARE (Australian National Antarctic Research Expeditions) aircraft in 1956. It was named by Antarctic Names Committee of Australia (ANCA) for R.D. Bergin, radio officer at Mawson Station in 1956.
