= Mount Sibiryakov =

Mountain in Enderby Land, Antarctica

Mount Sibiryakov (67°56′S 49°35′E) is an isolated mountain about 16 miles (26 km) south of Mount Humble of the Raggatt Mountains, in Enderby Land. Rock outcrops here were investigated by the Soviet Antarctic Expedition of 1961-62 who named the feature for the Soviet icebreaker Sibiryakov.
