= Archibald White =

Archibald or Archie White may refer to:

- Sir Archibald White, 4th Baronet (1877–1945), English amateur first-class cricketer
- Archibald White (umpire) (1871–1920), Test match cricket umpire
- Archie Cecil Thomas White (1890–1971), English recipient of the Victoria Cross
- Archie White (rugby union) (born 1997), English rugby union player

== See also ==
- Archie Whyte (1919–1973), Scottish footballer
