= World records for fastest motorcycle ride around Australia =

Long-distance motorcycle riding

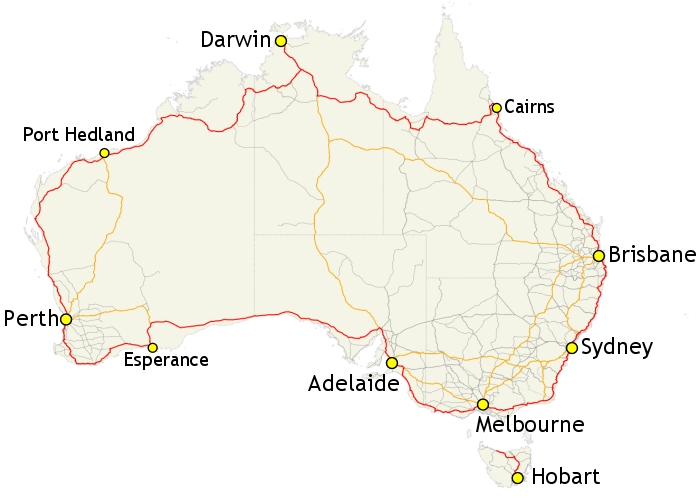
Australia Highway 1

World records for fastest motorcycle ride around Australia The official route for the record around Australia is via Highway 1, visiting every capital city (except Hobart) starting at any point travelling clockwise or anti-clockwise. This official route was deemed necessary due to the great discrepancy in the distances covered by the riders. The first motorcycle ride around Australia was originally a US$20,000 bet made in 1972 between two Americans, Entrepreneur Frank Wheeler (AKA Big Frank) and record producer Julian Grant. Big Frank began the records riding on a 125 cc Hodaka motorcycle with his recorded time of 21 days and 0 hours in July 1972.

Following is a list of the records made over the years until the current record in 1987.

- Frank Wheeler, July 1972, Hodaka 125cc, 16572 kilometres. 21 days 0 hours.
- Julian Grant, May 1973, Honda 750cc, Approximately 16000 kilometres. 19 days 0 hours.
- Chris Peckham, December 1973, Honda 125cc, kilometres not recorded. 18 days 8 hours.
- Don Kerr and Rich Willey, October 1974, Kawasaki 900cc, 16400 kilometres. 16 days 10 hours.
- Barry Renton, November 1974, Suzuki 500cc, 13500 kilometres. 14 days 9 hours.
- Shane Mc Lachlan, March 1975, Honda 350cc, kilometres not recorded. 14 days 4 hours 30 minutes.
- Barry Renton, September 1975. Kawasaki 400cc, kilometres not recorded. 10 days 9 hours or 10 days and 10 hours
- Rich Willey, November 1976. Kawasaki 650cc, 15300 kilometres. 10 days. 7 hours 54 minutes.
- Warwick Schuberg, October 1977. Kawasaki 900cc, kilometres not recorded. 9 days 23 hours.
- Terry Tex O`Grady, March 1978. Honda 750cc, kilometres not recorded. 8 days 23 hours 51 minutes.
- Ray Kerr Lansom, October 1981. BMW. Kilometres not recorded. 8 days 4 hours 57 minutes.
- Ross Atkin, September 1982. Kawasaki Z1300. 15000 Kilometres. 6 days 22 hours 51 minutes.
- Rich Willey and Gary Van Straten, October 1987. Each riding a Kawasaki 1000cc. 15508 Kilometres. 6 days 17 hours 6 minutes. (Current world record)

== In published works ==
Oz : around Australia on a Triumph by Geoff Hill describes the route in detail.
