= Mount Lira =

Mountain in Enderby Land, Antarctica

Mount Lira (67°52′S 48°53′E) is a mountain located 5 nautical miles (9 km) east of the Condon Hills, in Enderby Land, Antarctica. The geology of this feature was investigated by the Soviet Antarctic Expedition of 1961–62, which called it "Gora Lira" (lyre mountain), probably because of its shape.
