= Will Hudson =

Will Hudson may refer to:

- Will Hudson (basketball)
- Will Hudson (songwriter)

== See also ==
- William Hudson (disambiguation)
