= Margaret Gale =

English operatic soprano (1931–2025)

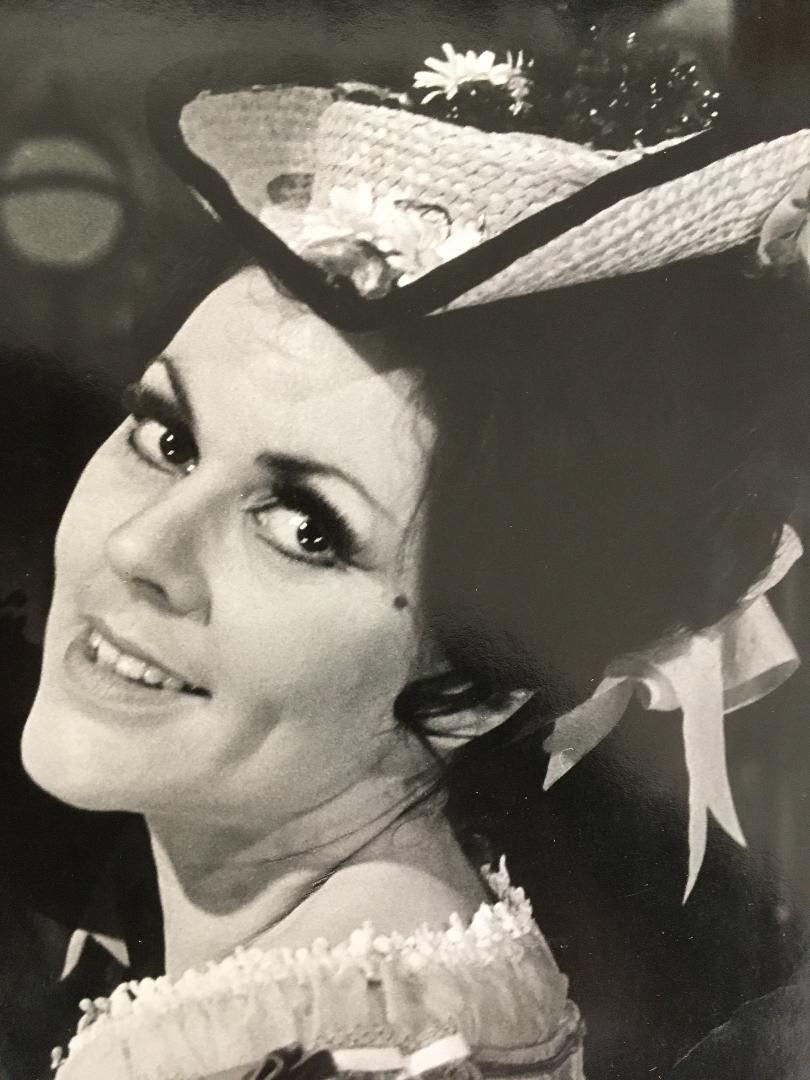
Margaret Gale

Margaret Winifred Gale (10 September 1931 – 25 February 2025) was an English operatic soprano who sang leading roles with Sadler's Wells Opera Company (later to become English National Opera) throughout the 1960s and early 1970s.

== Early life ==
Margaret Gale was born and educated in Sheffield, the second of three daughters of Winifred née Walker and Arthur Gale, an artisan working in the cutlery trade for Joseph Rodgers of Sheffield but who also had his own cutlery business employing six people. She first sang in public at the age of four and by her teens had gained a local reputation, performing solos and duets at Crookes Congregational Church in Sheffield where, at 19, she sang the title role in Paul Abraham's operetta Victoria and Her Hussar. Her first jobs were as a clerk at Bennet College and then with the National Coal Board.

She appeared with several local operatic societies taking leading roles in Oklahoma!, Carousel and Song of Norway. Her first operatic roles were with the Sheffield Grand Opera Society as Oscar (a travesty role) in The Masked Ball and Abigail in Nabucco. It was after this that she was advised to start training seriously for a professional singing career. Aged 19, she began lessons with Eva Rich at the same time as Joyce Blackham and Peter Glossop, also later to become stalwarts of Sadler's Wells.

== Career ==
After a decade as a semi-professional singer Gale sang her first role in London as Adele in Die Fledermaus for the London County Council Open Air Theatres. The spring of 1961 saw her at Glyndebourne in cover roles after which she made her first appearance as a principal with the Sadler's Wells Opera Company in the 1961/2 season as Musetta in La Bohème. In 1963 she spent a month in Milan studying with the baritone Luigi Borgonovo (1899–1975), the teacher of Franco Corelli and Luciano Pavarotti.

In the space of three years she proved her versatility, singing the roles of Esmeralda in The Bartered Bride; and was one of the three spirits in The Magic Flute. In January 1962 the Sadler's Wells Opera Company gave its first Gilbert and Sullivan opera, Iolanthe, on the day on which the Savoy Operas came out of copyright and the D'Oyly Carte monopoly ended. Gale played both Celia and Phyllis in the well-received production. When Iolanthe was broadcast on television by the BBC on 1 October 1964 Gale played Celia. She sang The Slim Girl in A Village Romeo and Juliet (1962); Alicia in Count Ory; a Niece in Peter Grimes (1964); Gabrielle in La Vie Parisienne; and Millie in Our Man in Havana. Other roles with the Sadler's Wells Opera Company included Norina in Don Pasquale, of which Alan Blyth wrote in The Times: ‘Margaret Gale has just the vivacious personality and nimble technique to portray the heroine’s sense of fun'. She was Ännchen in Der Freischütz; Zerlina in Don Giovanni; Despina in Così fan tutte; Adele in Die Fledermaus, of which Mosco Carner wrote in The Times: ‘a quicksilver Adele who brought off her Laughing Song with much gusto’; and Saffi in The Gypsy Baron, singing under the batons of Bryan Balkwill, Colin Davis, Peter Gellhorn, Leonard Hancock, Charles Mackerras and John Matheson among others. In 1965 she was a memorable Clorinda in La Cenerentola. After the Sadler's Wells company moved to the London Coliseum in 1968 her roles included Naiad in Ariadne on Naxos and Servilia in La clemenza di Tito.

For the New Opera Company, Gale was the lead soprano in the world premiere of Daniel Jones’s The Knife and created the role of Natalie in John Joubert’s Under Western Eyes, based on the novel by Joseph Conrad. In 1969, for the opening season of Opera Piccola at Dodington Hall, she sang the role of Vespetta in a rare performance of Telemann’s 1725 opera Pimpinone. On 7 August 1969 she was the coloratura soprano at the BBC Proms in the first performance of Wilfrid Mellers’s Yeibichai for chorus, orchestra, jazz trio, coloratura soprano and jazz singer with the Scottish National Orchestra conducted by Alexander Gibson.

In Scotland she sang Adele in Die Fledermaus (1968); Naiad in Ariadne on Naxos (1969), and Servilia in La clemenza di Tito (1970).

With the Dublin Grand Opera and Cork Opera companies she sang Adele in Die Fledermaus; Sophie in Der Rosenkavalier – ‘a voice of impressive range and purity brought this somewhat anaemic part to life’ and Josefa in White Horse Inn. With the Basilica Opera Company she played Valencienne in The Merry Widow and Micaela in Carmen. With the Phoenix Opera Company she sang Miss Wordsworth in Albert Herring and Susanna in The Marriage of Figaro.

In 1973, Margaret Gale left the Sadler's Wells company to embark on a freelance career of concert work and teaching. For two years, she taught singing at Roehampton College (now the University of Roehampton). Afterwards, she began a third career as a recruitment consultant, founding her own company, Gale Associates, in 1987. She retired in 2004.

== Personal life and death ==
Margaret Gale married footballer Jim Stainton in Sheffield in 1953; they separated in 1961. After living with Canadian bass Don Garrard for six years, the couple married in 1967; they separated six months later.

Gale died on 25 February 2025, at the age of 93.
