= Condon Hills =

Hills in Antarctica

The Condon Hills (67°53′S 48°38′E) are a group of hills rising to 840 metres (2,760 ft) along the east side of Rayner Glacier, Enderby Land. They were plotted from air photos taken by Australian National Antarctic Research Expeditions in 1956 and 1957, and named by the Antarctic Names Committee of Australia for M.A. Condon, Assistant Director, Bureau of Mineral Resources, Canberra, Australia.

== See also ==
- Mount Lira, located 5 nautical miles (9 km) east of the Condon Hills
