= Carl Stearns Clancy =

American long-distance motorcycle rider (1890–1971)

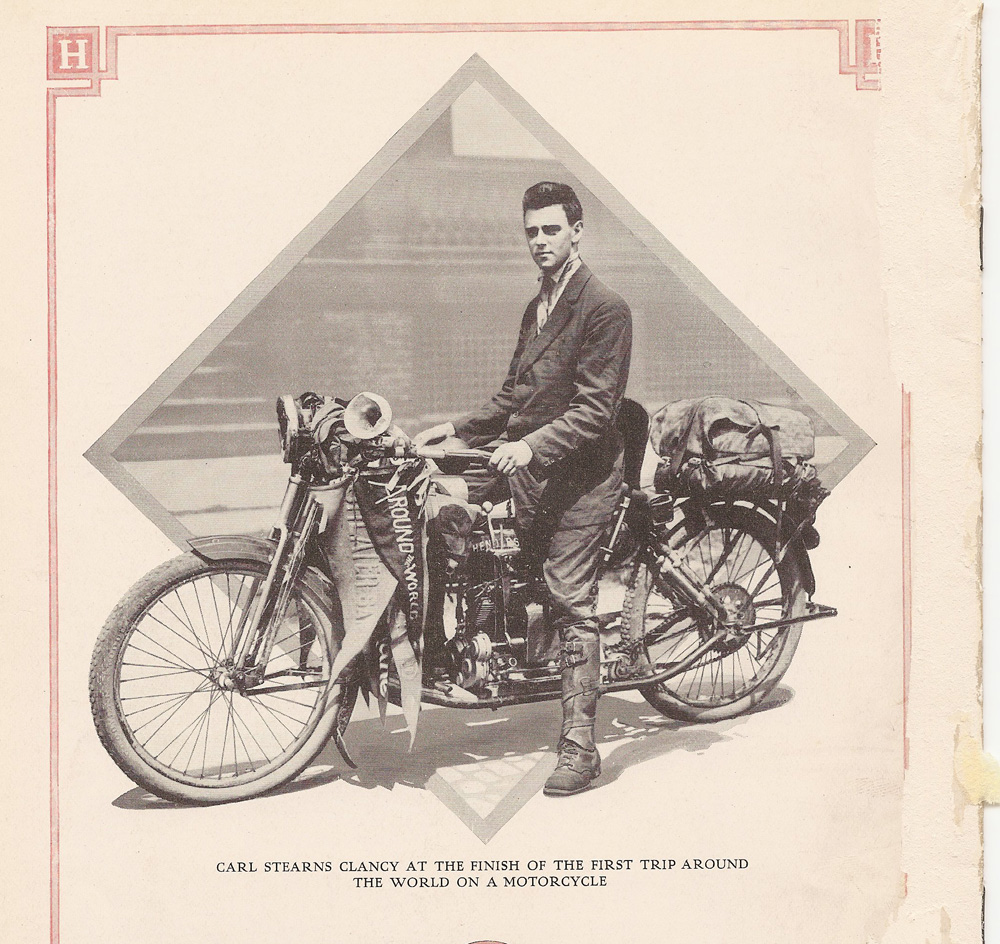
- Clancy on Henderson Four after world circumnavigation, 1913
- Born: August 8, 1890; Epping, New Hampshire, USA
- Died: January 1971; Alexandria, Virginia, USA
- Known for: First world circumnavigation by motorcycle

Carl Stearns Clancy (8 August 1890 – January 1971) was an American long-distance motorcycle rider, film director and producer. He is credited with being the first person to circumnavigate the world on a motorcycle.

== Life ==
Clancy was born in New Hampshire in 1890, the son of Alice Clancy from Massachusetts, and William Clancy, a 55-year-old Irishman. He became an advertising copy writer.

In early October 1912, along with his biking partner, Walter Rendell Storey, he sailed from New York to Dublin, via Liverpool. His bike was a 934 cc 7-horsepower (5.2 kW) 1912 Henderson Four motorcycle. The editor of The Irish Cyclist, Richard J. Mecredy (the inventor of bicycle polo) gave them road maps and helped them plot their route in Ireland. After covering the northern part of the country, they both got the ferry to Glasgow. Storey returned home from Paris, while Clancy continued his circumnavigation of the globe until August 1913. During the trip he rode 18,000 miles in Europe, Africa, Asia and North America.

Clancy helped finance his trip by submitting details of his epic journey to Bicycling World and Motorcycle Review, a New York-based weekly magazine.

Clancy produced or directed a number of Will Rogers movies starting with The Headless Horseman in 1922. In his later life, he moved to Virginia and made documentaries for the United States Forest Service.

One must die sometime and to die with one's boots on is very noble.

— Carl Stearns Clancy (while riding his motorcycle at night in Spain, 1913), from Frazier 2010

The longest, most difficult, and most perilous motorcycle journey ever attempted.

— The Bicycling World and Motorcycle Review, 1912, quoted by Hill in The Telegraph

== Centenary commemorative circumnavigation ==
After reading the 2010 book Motorcycle Adventurer by Dr. Gregory W. Frazier, two serious Irish adventurers decided to organize a global re-enactment of the Clancy record setting ride around the world. Feargal O’Neill and his colleague Joe Walsh, in conjunction with the motorcycle traveller's website Horizons Unlimited, in 2011 announced the Clancy Centenary Ride for 2012–2013. According to O'Neill, "I feel that there is a duty on us modern-day motorcyclists to do our bit to honour the memory of this great pioneer of our sport."

In 2013, Geoff Hill and Gary Walker recreated Clancy's ride, joined by Gregory W. Frazier and Richard Livermore for the North American transcontinental portion. Their travels were serialized by Hill in The Irish Times, and blogged on an Australian sponsor's website, and the American portion by Frazier in Motorcycle USA. Hill's travelogue In Clancy's Boots was published in 2013.

== Bibliography ==
- Clancy, Carl Stearns (2013), The Gasoline Tramp or Around the World on a Motorcycle (e-book edition of previously unpublished book ed.), Booksmango, ISBN 978-616-222-255-9
