= Gordon Livie =

English footballer

Personal information
- Full name: Gordon Livie
- Date of birth: 10 June 1932
- Place of birth: Billingham, England
- Date of death: 2004 (aged 71–72)
- Position: Central defender

Senior career*
Years	Team	Apps	(Gls)
1949–1950	Leicester City	0	(0)
1952–1954	Mansfield Town	21	(0)
1958-1961	Bourne Town	92	(90)
Total		103	(90)
- * Club domestic league appearances and goals

Gordon Livie (10 June 1932 – 2004) was an English professional footballer who played in the Football League for Mansfield Town.

He would later sign for Sid Ottewell at Bourne Town and score a blistering 90 goals in 92 appearances over 3 seasons. This included 6 hat-tricks and scoring 5 goals in a game against Brush Sports Reserves on 4th April 1959.
