= Mount Merrick (Antarctica) =

Mountain in Antarctica

- Location within Antarctica

Highest point
- Elevation: 1,120 m (3,670 ft)
- Coordinates: 67°42′S 49°18′E

Geography
- Continent: Antarctica
- Parent range: Raggatt Mountains

Mount Merrick is a mountain, 1,120 metres (3,670 ft) high, standing 3 nautical miles (6 km) west of Mount Humble in the Raggatt Mountains of Antarctica. It is about 20 nautical miles (37 km) south-east of Casey Bay in Enderby Land. The mountain was plotted from air photos taken by the Australian National Antarctic Research Expeditions in 1956 and 1957, and was named by the Antarctic Names Committee of Australia for Robert William Merrick, a geophysicist at Mawson Station in 1960.
