= Geoff Hill (Northern Ireland journalist) =

Author, journalist and motorcycle rider (born 1956)

- Born: 21 May 1956 (age 70)
- Occupations: Journalist, book writer
- Writing career
- Language: English
- Subject: Travel writing

Geoff Hill (born 21 May 1956) is an author, journalist and long-distance motorcycle rider living in Belfast. He is a critically acclaimed author and award-winning feature and travel writer.

He studied at Queen's University Belfast from 1975 to 1979, where he was editor of The Gown, and graduated with a BA in English Language and Literature.

While at Queen's, he earned a Blue by making his first appearance for the Northern Ireland men's volleyball team. He went on to captain the team at the 1981 Commonwealth Championships and to play for Northern Ireland 122 times, still an Irish record.

After starting his career in journalism on the Tyrone Constitution, Hill was the features and travel editor of the Belfast News Letter from January 1991 – March 2009, then motorcycle columnist for the Irish Times, Sunday Times and Daily Mirror. He's the editor of Microlight Flying magazine and the Daily Telegraph's travel expert on Northern Ireland.

== Works ==
His first travel book, Way to Go (2005), on two motorcycle journeys - from Delhi to Belfast on a Royal Enfield and Route 66 on a Harley Davidson - was published in April 2005. was nominated for UK travel book of the year and has been reprinted six times.

The sequel, The Road to Gobblers Knob (2007), on a ride from Chile to Alaska along the 16,500 miles of the Pan-American Highway, was published in Spring 2007 and became an immediate Waterstone’s best seller. His next book, Anyway, Where Was I? Geoff Hill’s alternative A-Z of the world (2008), was published in October 2008 and also went straight into Waterstone’s best sellers list.

A 2010 work, Oz : around Australia on a Triumph, describes his 15,000 mile motorcycle circumnavigation of Australia with a partner on Highway 1.

In 2013 he wrote In Clancy's Boots, the story of Carl Stearns Clancy, who traveled around the world by motorcycle. Hill recreated Clancy's 1912–1913 circumnavigation of the globe (see Carl Stearns Clancy § Centenary commemorative circumnavigation), carrying with him Clancy's original boots, which are now in the National Motorcycle Museum in Anamosa, Iowa, along with Clancy's diaries, photographs, pith helmet and the world's only unrestored 1912 Henderson, the type of motorcycle Clancy rode.

Hill has either won or been shortlisted for a UK Travel Writer of the Year award nine times. He is also a former Irish Travel Writer of the Year and a former Mexican Government European Travel Writer of the Year, and has been Northern Ireland Features Journalist of the Year three times. In 2007 he was NITB Northern Ireland Journalist of the Year. In 2005, he was given a Golden Pen award by the Croatian Tourist Board for the best worldwide feature or broadcast on Zagreb.

He is the author of three novels, Smith, of which The Independent on Sunday said: "Lyrical and lunatic... few first novels achieve as much", and which The Times described as "hilarious", Angel Street and The Butler's Son.

=== Bibliography ===
- Hill, Geoff (1994), Smith, Belfast: Blackstaff Press, ISBN 0856404853
- Hill, Geoff (2005), Way to Go: Two of the World's Great Motorcycle Journeys, Belfast: Blackstaff Press, ISBN 0856407658
- Hill, Geoff (2007), The Road To Gobblers Knob: From Chile to Alaska on a Motorbike, Belfast: Blackstaff Press, ISBN 978-0856408045
- Hill, Geoff (2008). Anyway, Where Was I?: Geoff Hill's Alternative A-Z of the World. Belfast: Blackstaff Press. ISBN 9780856408311.
- Hill, Geoff; O'Carroll, Colin (2010). Oz : around Australia on a Triumph. Belfast: Blackstaff Press. ISBN 978-0-85640-857-1.
- Hill, Geoff (2010), Angel Street, ASIN B0048ELAWG
- Hill, Geoff (2014). In Clancy's Boots: The Greatest Ever Round-the-World Motorbike Adventure. Belfast: Blackstaff Press. ISBN 978-0-85640-913-4.
- Hill, Geoff (2014), Geoff Hill's A-Z of Bikes, Amazon Digital Services, ASIN B00QZ39B60
- Hill, Geoff (2015), The Brownie Dawn Patrol: collected newspaper columns 1-4, Amazon Digital Services, ISBN 978-1521960080
- Hill, Geoff (2016), The Butler's Son, Thunderchild, ASIN B01M1E9PVI
- Hill, Geoff (2019), This Way Up, ASIN 1687706905
- Hill, Geoff (2019), Where was I again?, Amazon Digital Services
- Hill, Geoff (2020), I could have been a stoker for a vertical wimple crimper, Thunderchild
- Hill, Geoff (2021), How to be Happy: a self-help guide for baffled gentlefolk, Amazon Digital Services

== Awards ==
- Northern Ireland Tourist Board (NITB) Northern Ireland Journalist of the Year
