= Geoff Hill (mountaineer) =

Australian mountaineer

Geoffrey Leonard Hill (1941 – 25 October 1967) was an Australian mountaineer. He was the first (along with Colin Pritchard) to climb the 6451m peak Papsura in the Himachal Pradesh state of India on 3 June 1967.

The eldest of five children, Hill developed mountaineering skills in New Zealand, before going to India to work as an architect.

In October 1967, Hill was part of a small party attempting Mukarbeh (6069m), also in the Kullu district. On the thirteenth day of the expedition the weather turned against them, and Hill, Indian climber Suresh Kumar and Sherpa Pembar died when their tent was buried by heavy snowfall in a blizzard. He is buried at the Lady Willingdon Memorial Hospital in Manali
