= Jim McCarter (footballer) =

Scottish footballer (1923–2002)

Personal information
- Full name: James Joseph McCarter
- Date of birth: 19 March 1923
- Place of birth: Glasgow, Scotland
- Date of death: 22 August 2002 (aged 79)
- Place of death: Weymouth, England
- Position: Winger

Senior career*
Years	Team	Apps	(Gls)
1945–1946	Vale of Clyde		
1946–1948	Sheffield Wednesday	6	(0)
1948–1950	Mansfield Town	67	(10)
1950	Weymouth		
Total		73	(10)
- * Club domestic league appearances and goals

James Joseph McCarter (19 March 1923 – 22 August 2002) was a Scottish professional footballer who played in the Football League for Mansfield Town and Sheffield Wednesday.
