= Dennis Sinclair =

English footballer

Personal information
- Full name: Dennis Sinclair
- Date of birth: 20 November 1931
- Place of birth: Middlesbrough, England
- Date of death: 2011 (aged 79–80)
- Position: Forward

Senior career*
Years	Team	Apps	(Gls)
1952–1953	Derby County	0	(0)
1953–1954	Mansfield Town	1	(0)
Total		1	(0)
- * Club domestic league appearances and goals

Dennis Sinclair (20 November 1931 – 2011) was an English professional footballer who played in the Football League for Mansfield Town. He made one appearance in his entire professional career.
