= Geoffrey Hills =

Mountain range in Antarctica

The Geoffrey Hills (67°37′S 48°36′E) are a group of hills at the west end of the Raggatt Mountains in Enderby Land, Antarctica. They were plotted from air photos taken from Australian National Antarctic Research Expeditions aircraft in 1956, and were named by the Antarctic Names Committee of Australia for Geoffrey D.P. Smith, a carpenter at Mawson Station in 1961.
