= Billy Watkin =

English footballer

Personal information
- Full name: Thomas William Steel Watkin
- Date of birth: 14 December 1923
- Place of birth: Grimsby, England
- Date of death: 2001 (aged 77–78)
- Position: Inside forward

Youth career
- Grimsby Town

Senior career*
Years	Team	Apps	(Gls)
1949–1952	Grimsby Town	0	(0)
1952–1954	Gateshead	39	(14)
1954–1955	Middlesbrough	11	(2)
1955–1956	Mansfield Town	25	(4)
- * Club domestic league appearances and goals

Thomas William Steel Watkin (21 September 1932 – 2001) was an English footballer who played as an inside forward.

Watkin was an England schoolboy international who came through the junior ranks at Grimsby Town, signing a professional contract with them in October 1949. In December 1952, Watkin joined Gateshead, scoring a total of 14 goals in 40 league and cup appearances before moving to neighbours Middlesbrough in March 1954, where he scored 2 goals in 11 games. Watkin joined Mansfield Town in June 1955, scoring 5 goals in 26 league and cup games.

== Sources ==
- "allfootballers.com".
- "Post War English & Scottish Football League A–Z Player's Transfer Database".
