= John Heather =

English footballer (1933–2008)

Personal information
- Full name: Leslie John Heather
- Date of birth: 25 April 1933
- Place of birth: Winchcombe, England
- Date of death: 2008 (aged 86–87)
- Position: Inside forward

Senior career*
Years	Team	Apps	(Gls)
1950–1951	Derby County	0	(0)
1951–1953	Belper Town		
1953–1954	Mansfield Town	1	(0)
1954	Ransome & Marles		
Total		1	(0)
- * Club domestic league appearances and goals

John Heather (25 April 1933 – 2008) was an English professional footballer who played in the Football League for Mansfield Town.
