= Harry Lee (footballer, born 1933) =

English footballer

Personal information
- Full name: Harold Lee
- Date of birth: 13 January 1933
- Place of birth: Mexborough, England
- Date of death: February 2022 (aged 89)
- Position: Inside forward

Senior career*
Years	Team	Apps	(Gls)
1949–1950	Thomas Hill Youth Club		
1950–1951	Derby County	0	(0)
1954–1955	Doncaster Rovers	0	(0)
1955–1956	Mansfield Town	3	(2)
1957–1958	Denaby United	0	(0)
1959–1960	Matlock Town	4	(3)
Total		7+	(5+)
- * Club domestic league appearances and goals

Harold Lee (13 January 1933 - February 2022) was an English professional footballer who played in the Football League for Mansfield Town.
