= Len Kieran =

English footballer

Personal information
- Date of birth: 25 July 1926
- Place of birth: Birkenhead, England
- Date of death: 24 July 1981 (aged 54)
- Place of death: Birkenhead, England
- Position: Left half

Senior career*
Years	Team	Apps	(Gls)
1947–1957	Tranmere Rovers	342	(6)
1957–?	Macclesfield Town	?	(?)
- * Club domestic league appearances and goals

Len Kieran (25 July 1926 – 24 July 1981) was an English footballer who played as a left half for Tranmere Rovers and Macclesfield Town. He made 359 appearances for Tranmere, scoring 6 goals.
