= Bill Hudson (Alaska politician) =

American politician and businessman (1932–2021)

Commissioner of the Alaska Department of Administration
- In office 1979 – May 1982
- Preceded by: Bill B. Allen
- Succeeded by: Carole Burger

Member of the Alaska House of Representatives from the 4th district
- In office January 19, 1987 – January 16, 1995
- Preceded by: M. Mike Miller
- Succeeded by: Caren Robinson
- In office January 13, 1997 – January 21, 2003
- Preceded by: Caren Robinson
- Succeeded by: Bruce Weyhrauch

Personal details
- Born: William Ray Hudson; December 14, 1932 Yuma, Arizona, U.S.
- Died: October 11, 2021 (aged 88) Juneau, Alaska, U.S.
- Party: Republican

William Ray Hudson (December 14, 1932 – October 11, 2021) was an American businessman, government official and politician, best known for representing Juneau, Alaska in the Alaska House of Representatives for seven terms.

Born in Yuma, Arizona, Hudson graduated from the Wallace, Idaho High School in 1951. He served in the United States Navy and the United States Coast Guard, where he reached the rank of Commander. Hudson attended Columbia University and Juilliard School in New York City. After living in Ketchikan, Soldotna, Kodiak, and Dot Lake, Alaska, he and his second wife Lucy settled in Juneau in 1974 where he was in the real estate business. A Republican, he served in the Alaska House of Representatives from 1987 to 1995 and from 1997 to 2003. Hudson and Lucy, who was a special assistant to Senator Frank Murkowski and Representative Don Young, had nine children between them: Shawna, Joseph, Patti, Teresa, James, David, Steve, Karen and Kristen. They moved from Juneau to Castle Rock, Colorado in 2017 where Lucy could be provided with memory care. She died in 2018. Hudson died on October 11, 2021.
