= Ken Scott (English footballer) =

English footballer

Personal information
- Full name: Kenneth Scott
- Date of birth: 13 August 1931 (age 95)
- Place of birth: Maltby, South Yorkshire, England
- Position: Winger

Senior career*
Years	Team	Apps	(Gls)
1949–1950	Denaby United		
1950–1951	Derby County	2	(0)
1951–1952	Denaby United		
1952–1953	Mansfield Town	5	(2)
Total		7	(2)
- * Club domestic league appearances and goals

Kenneth Scott (born 13 August 1931) was an English professional footballer who played in the Football League for Derby County and Mansfield Town.
