= Jimmy Adam (footballer, born 1931) =

Scottish footballer

Personal information
- Full name: James Adam
- Date of birth: 22 April 1931 (age 95)
- Place of birth: Paisley, Renfrewshire, Scotland
- Position: Inside forward

Senior career*
Years	Team	Apps	(Gls)
1950–1951	Penilee United		
1951–1952	Leeds United	0	(0)
1954–1955	Mansfield Town	39	(10)
1956	Airdrieonians		
Total		39	(10)
- * Club domestic league appearances and goals

James Adam (born 22 April 1931) is a Scottish former professional footballer who played in the Football League for Mansfield Town.
