= Percy Steele =

English footballer

Personal information
- Full name: Percival Edmund Steele
- Date of birth: 26 December 1923
- Place of birth: Liverpool, England
- Date of death: 21 October 2009 (aged 85)
- Place of death: Liverpool, England
- Position: Full back

Senior career*
Years	Team	Apps	(Gls)
?–1945	Carlton		
1945–1957	Tranmere Rovers	311	(0)
1945–1946	→Dundee United (guest)	4	(5)
1957–?	Burscough		
- * Club domestic league appearances and goals

Percival Edmund Steele (26 December 1923 – 21 October 2009) was an English footballer who played as a full back for Carlton, Tranmere Rovers and Burscough. He made 328 appearances for Tranmere. He also guested for Dundee United during January 1946.
