= Mount Currie (Australia) =

Mountain in Northern Territory, Australia

- Location within Northern Territory

Highest point
- Elevation: 564 m (1,850 ft)AHD
- Coordinates: 25°01′56″S 130°33′44″E

Geography
- Location: Northern Territory, Australia
- Parent range: Mount Currie Conglomerate

Climbing
- Easiest route: Hike

Mount Currie is a mountain in the southwest of the Northern Territory, Australia, with an elevation of 564 metres (1,850 ft) AHD. It is part of the same line of conglomerate hills that includes Uluṟu and Kata Tjuṯa. These three formations have very similar compositions. The sheet of conglomerate that is shared by all three is called Mount Currie Conglomerate.

The peak was named Mount Currie by the explorer William H. Tietkens, who led an expedition through the area in 1889. He named the peak from a distance, and did not actually approach it. The first European colonial explorers to reach Mount Currie were the expedition funded and led by Richard Thelwell Maurice during their journey from Fowlers Bay, South Australia to the Cambridge Gulf in the Kimberley Region of Western Australia. The expedition reached and camped at Mount Currie on 8 July 1902 climbing the largest domes and taking readings and measurements. The area was also visited by the Mackay Expedition in June 1926, which was led by Donald Mackay and Herbert Basedow.

== See also ==
- List of mountains of the Northern Territory

Parliamentary paper (South Australia. Parliament. House of Assembly); A-no. 43. (11 November 1904) - Maurice, R. T. - Fowler's Bay to Rawlinson Ranges, and Fowler's Bay to Cambridge Gulf
