= Jack Vitty =

English footballer (1923–2021)

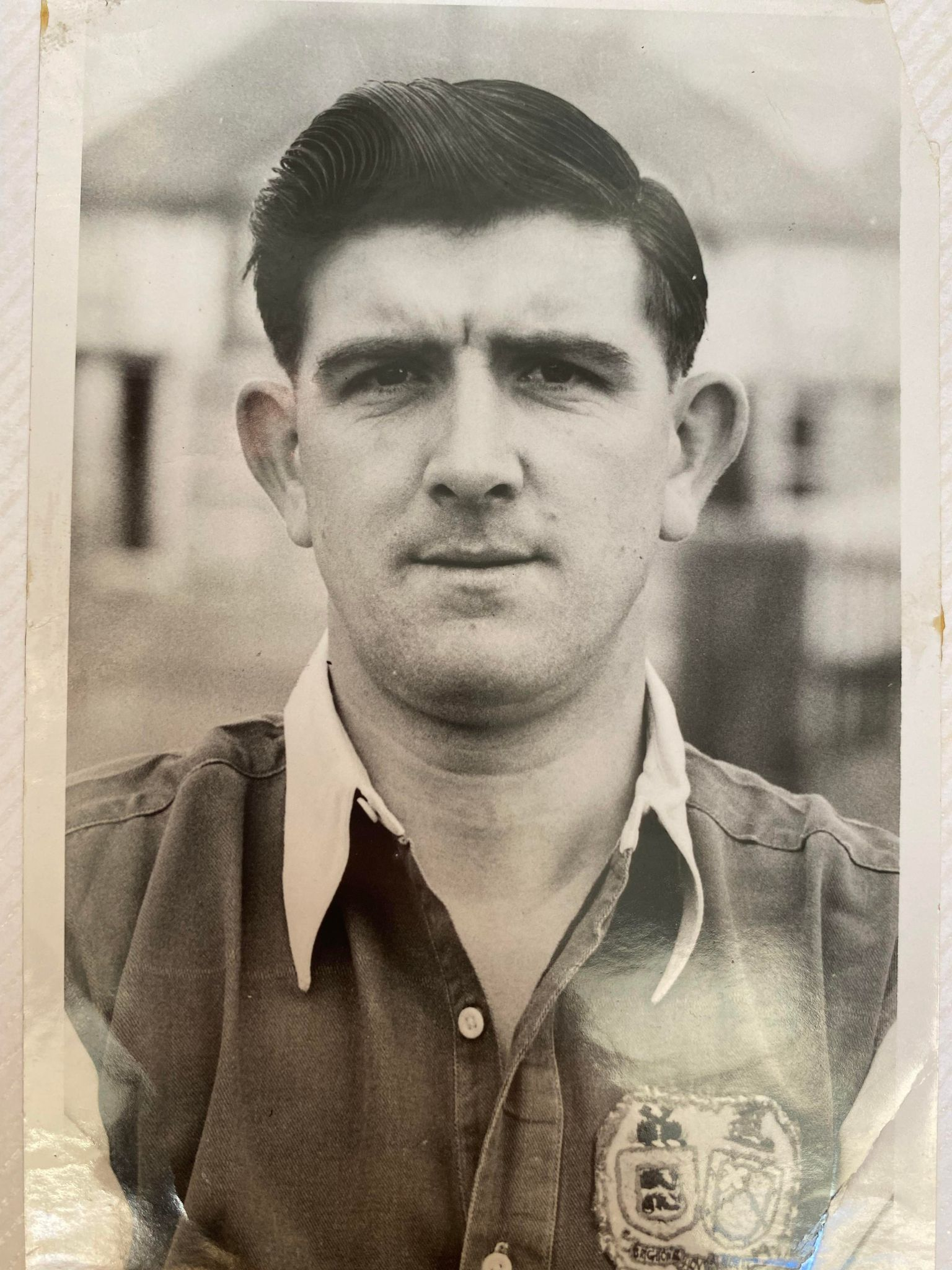
- Jack Vitty in Brighton and Hove Albion Shirt season 1950-51

Personal information
- Full name: John Vitty
- Date of birth: 19 January 1923
- Place of birth: Chilton, County Durham, England
- Date of death: 4 November 2021 (aged 98)
- Place of death: Newcastle upon Tyne, Tyne and Wear, England
- Position: Left-back

Senior career*
Years	Team	Apps	(Gls)
1948–1949	Charlton Athletic	2	(0)
1949–1952	Brighton & Hove Albion	47	(1)
1952–1957	Workington	196	(3)
1957–1958	South Shields		
Total		245	(5)
- * Club domestic league appearances and goals

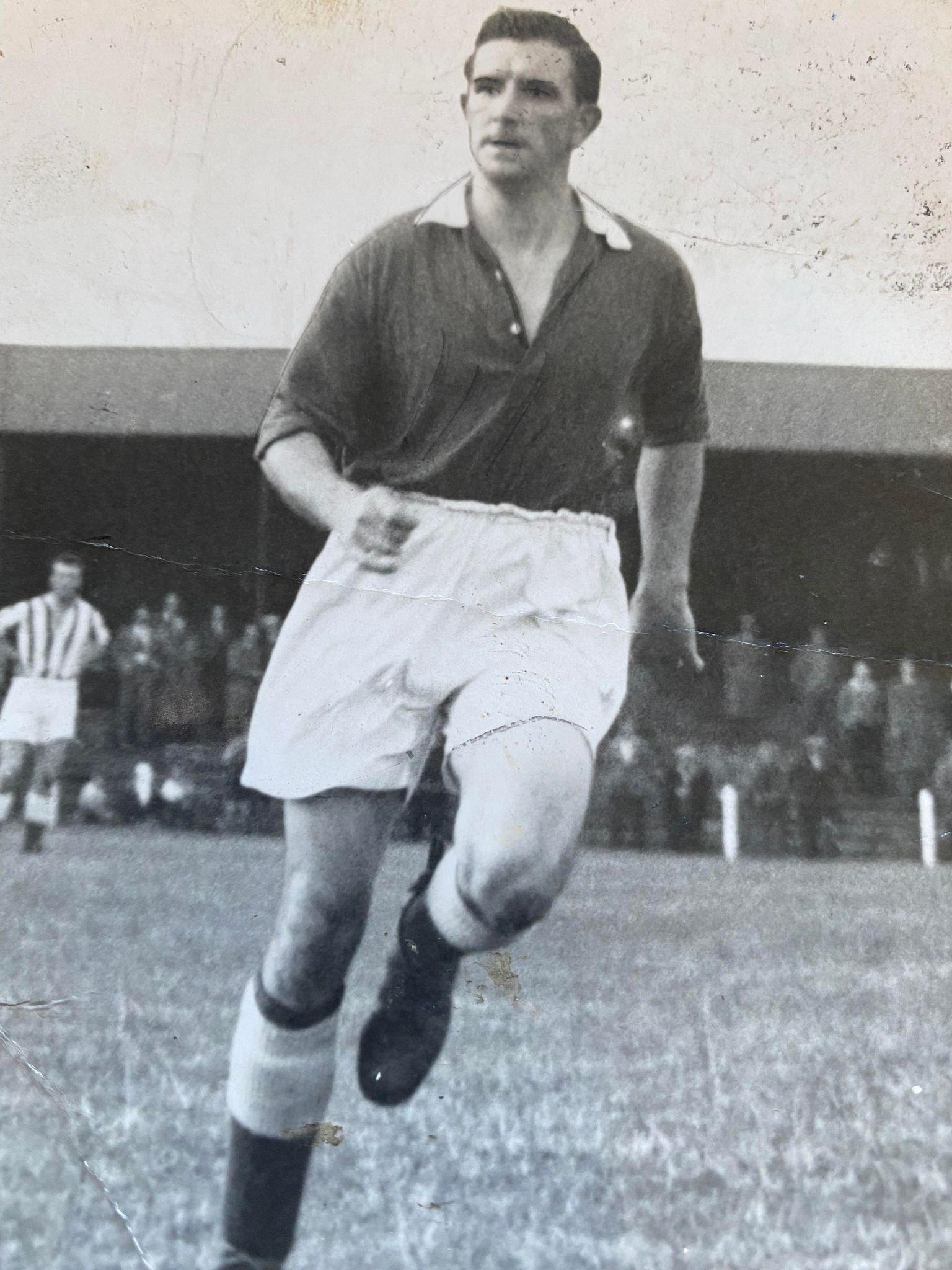
Jack Vitty playing for Workington 1954-55

John Vitty (19 January 1923 – 4 November 2021) was an English footballer who played as a left-back in The Football League.

Vitty died on 4 November 2021, at the age of 98.
