= Raggatt Mountains =

Mountain range in Antarctica

Raggatt Mountains (67°42′S 49°0′E) is a group of peaks westward from the Scott Mountains, lying east of Rayner Glacier and north of Thyer Glacier. Delineated by ANARE (Australian National Antarctic Research Expeditions) from air photos taken by RAAF Antarctic Flight of 1956. Named by Antarctic Names Committee of Australia (ANCA) for Dr. H.G. Raggatt, Secretary of the Australian Dept. of National Development.

== Features ==
Geographical features include:

- Dick Peaks
- Geoffrey Hills
- Mount Bergin
- Mount Dyke
- Mount Humble
- Mount Maslen
- Mount Merrick
- Thyer Glacier
