= Mount Maslen =

Mountain in Antarctica

Coordinates: 67°42′S 49°7′E

Mount Maslen is a mountain, 1,200 metres (4,000 ft) high, standing 1 nautical mile (2 km) west of Mount Currie in the Raggatt Mountains of Enderby Land, Antarctica. It was plotted from air photos taken from Australian National Antarctic Research Expeditions aircraft in 1956 and was named by the Antarctic Names Committee of Australia for A.W.G. Maslen, the officer-in-charge at Mawson Station in 1961.
