= Eddie Hawksford =

English footballer

Personal information
- Full name: Edward Hawksford
- Date of birth: 7 November 1931
- Place of birth: Liverpool, England
- Date of death: 1985 (aged 53–54)
- Position: Winger

Senior career*
Years	Team	Apps	(Gls)
1952	British Army		
1952–1953	Mansfield Town	1	(0)
Total		1	(0)
- * Club domestic league appearances and goals

Edward Hawksford (7 November 1931 – 1985) was an English professional footballer who played in the Football League for Mansfield Town.
