= Jim Stainton =

English footballer

Personal information
- Full name: James Kenneth Stainton
- Date of birth: 14 December 1931
- Place of birth: Sheffield, England
- Date of death: 2009 (aged 87–88)
- Position: Full back

Senior career*
| Years | Team | Apps | (Gls) |
| 1953–1954 | Bradford Park Avenue | 0 | (0) |
| 1954–1957 | Mansfield Town | 9 | (0) |
| Total | | 9 | (0) |
- * Club domestic league appearances and goals

James Kenneth Stainton (14 December 1931 – 2009) was an English professional footballer who played in the Football League for Mansfield Town.

He married the operatic soprano Margaret Gale in Sheffield in 1953. They separated in 1961 and later divorced.
