= Vince Wright =

English footballer

Personal information
- Full name: Vincent Wright
- Date of birth: 12 April 1931
- Place of birth: Bradford, England
- Date of death: 2004 (aged 72–73)
- Position: Winger

Senior career*
Years	Team	Apps	(Gls)
1952	Derby County	0	(0)
1952–1953	Mansfield Town	2	(0)
Total		2	(0)
- * Club domestic league appearances and goals

Vincent Wright (12 April 1931 – 2004) was an English professional footballer who played in the Football League for Mansfield Town.
