= Fred Batty =

English footballer

Personal information
- Full name: Frederick Robson Batty
- Date of birth: 20 December 1934
- Place of birth: Stanley, County Durham, England
- Date of death: 2007 (aged 72–73)
- Position: Central defender

Senior career*
Years	Team	Apps	(Gls)
1954–1955	Stanley United		
1955–1959	Bradford Park Avenue	56	(0)
Total		56	(0)
- * Club domestic league appearances and goals

Frederick Robson Batty (20 December 1934 – 2007) was an English professional footballer who played in the Football League for Bradford Park Avenue.
