= John Cuthbertson (footballer, born 1932) =

Scottish footballer

Personal information
- Full name: John Cuthbertson
- Date of birth: 10 March 1932
- Place of birth: Glasgow, Scotland
- Date of death: 1966 (aged 33–34)
- Position: Inside forward

Senior career*
Years	Team	Apps	(Gls)
1953–1954	Mansfield Town	3	(0)
Total		3	(0)
- * Club domestic league appearances and goals

John Cuthbertson (10 March 1932 – 1966) was a Scottish professional footballer who played in the Football League for Mansfield Town.
