= Willie White (footballer, born 1932) =

Scottish footballer

Personal information
- Full name: William White
- Date of birth: 25 September 1932
- Place of birth: Clackmannan, Scotland
- Date of death: 2015 (aged 82–83)
- Position: Goalkeeper

Senior career*
Years	Team	Apps	(Gls)
1951–1952	Alva Albion Rangers		
1952–1953	Motherwell		
1953–1954	Accrington Stanley	18	(0)
1954–1955	Mansfield Town	3	(0)
1955	→ Derby County (loan)	3	(0)
1956	Bacup Borough		
Total		24	(0)
- * Club domestic league appearances and goals

William White (25 September 1932 – 2015) was a Scottish professional footballer who played in the Football League for Accrington Stanley, Derby County and Mansfield Town.
