= Gordon Revel =

English footballer (1927–2024)

Personal information
- Full name: Gordon Harold Revel
- Date of birth: 1 October 1927
- Place of birth: Mansfield, England
- Date of death: 29 September 2024 (aged 96)
- Position: Full-back

Senior career*
Years	Team	Apps	(Gls)
1952–1953	Mansfield Town	1	(0)
Total		1	(0)
- * Club domestic league appearances and goals

Gordon Harold Revel (1 October 1927 – 29 September 2024) was an English professional footballer who played as a full-back in the Football League for Mansfield Town. Revel died on 29 September 2024, at the age of 96.
