= Geoff Hill (footballer, born 1929) =

English footballer

Personal information
- Full name: Geoffrey Raymond Hill
- Date of birth: 31 August 1929
- Place of birth: Carlisle, England
- Date of death: March 28, 2014
- Place of death: Victoria, B. C., Canada
- Position: Full back

Senior career*
Years	Team	Apps	(Gls)
1949–1958	Carlisle United	190	(0)
Total		190	(0)
- * Club domestic league appearances and goals

Geoffrey Raymond Hill (31 August 1929 – 28 March 2014) was an English professional footballer who played in the Football League for Carlisle United.
