= Rayner Glacier =

Glacier in Antarctica

Rayner Glacier (67°40′S 48°25′E) is a prominent glacier, 19 kilometres (10 nmi) wide, flowing north to the coast of Enderby Land just west of Condon Hills. It was sighted in October 1956 by Squadron Leader D. Leckie during a flight in an ANARE (Australian National Antarctic Research Expeditions) Beaver aircraft, and named by ANCA for J.M. Rayner, Director of the Bureau of Mineral Resources in the Australian Department of National Development.

== See also ==
- Ice stream
- List of glaciers in the Antarctic
- List of Antarctic ice streams
