= Frank Allen (footballer, born 1927) =

English footballer

Personal information
- Full name: Frank Allen
- Date of birth: 28 June 1927
- Place of birth: Shirebrook, England
- Date of death: 2014 (aged 86–87)
- Position: Wing half

Senior career*
Years	Team	Apps	(Gls)
1950–1951	Langwith Imperial		
1951–1953	Chesterfield	3	(0)
1953–1955	Mansfield Town	6	(0)
Total		9	(0)
- * Club domestic league appearances and goals

Frank Allen (28 June 1927 – 2014) was an English professional footballer who played in the Football League for Chesterfield and Mansfield Town.
