= Alec Gaskell =

English footballer

Personal information
- Full name: Alexander Gaskell
- Date of birth: 30 July 1932
- Place of birth: Leigh, England
- Date of death: 14 March 2014 (aged 81)
- Position: Striker

Senior career*
Years	Team	Apps	(Gls)
1949–1951	Manchester United	0	(0)
1951–1953	Southport	44	(18)
1953–1954	Newcastle United	1	(0)
1954–1956	Mansfield Town	42	(17)
1956–1957	Grantham Town		
1957	Tranmere Rovers	6	(6)
1957–1959	Rhyl		
1959–1960	Wigan Rovers		
1960–1962	Mossley	50	(28)
1962	Winsford United		
- * Club domestic league appearances and goals

Alexander Gaskell (30 July 1932 – 14 March 2014 ) was an English professional footballer. He played in the Football League for Southport, Newcastle United, Mansfield Town and Tranmere Rovers.

== Club career ==
Gaskell joined Manchester United as an amateur. He joined Mossley on trial in 1950, but remained on the Red Devils' books the following year, when he left the club to join Southport. He scored 18 goals in two seasons there. In 1953, he joined Newcastle United, but his only appearance for the Magpies came in a Boxing Day tie against Middlesbrough, where he was standing in for the injured Jackie Milburn and Alan Monkhouse. In 1954, he joined Mansfield Town. He scored 17 goals in two seasons there. On leaving Mansfield, he joined non-league Grantham Town in 1956. He left Grantham in May 1957, initially returning to Bolton to try to get back into league football, which he did with Tranmere Rovers later that year. Despite scoring six goals in six games, Gaskell left to join Rhyl.

He had a spell at Wigan Rovers, and then joined Mossley in 1960. He scored 28 times in 50 games for Mossley. He retired in 1962, after sustaining a broken wrist at Winsford United. He later found work as a cable manufacturer, working in Quality Control at the BICC complex in Leigh.

Gaskell died at the age of 81 on 14 March 2014. At the time of his death, he was living in Cheshire.
