= George Simpson (footballer, born 1933) =

English footballer

Personal information
- Full name: George Leonard Simpson
- Date of birth: 3 December 1933
- Place of birth: Shirebrook, England
- Date of death: 23 February 2012 (aged 78)
- Place of death: Cleveleys, England
- Position: Inside forward

Senior career*
Years	Team	Apps	(Gls)
1952–1954	Mansfield Town	8	(0)
1955	Hereford United		
1956–1957	Gillingham	8	(1)
1957	Headington United		
Total		16	(1)
- * Club domestic league appearances and goals

George Leonard Simpson (3 December 1933 – 23 February 2012) was an English professional footballer who played in the Football League for Gillingham and Mansfield Town.
