= Harry Wyles =

English footballer (1922–1982)

Personal information
- Full name: Harold Wyles
- Date of birth: 28 October 1922
- Place of birth: Melton Mowbray, England
- Date of death: 1982 (aged 59–60)
- Position: Full back

Senior career*
Years	Team	Apps	(Gls)
1945–1948	Leicester City	0	(0)
1948–1954	Gateshead	235	(7)
- * Club domestic league appearances and goals

Harold Wyles (28 October 1922 – 1982) was an English footballer who played as a full back.

Wyles started his career with Leicester City. Without making a first team appearance, Wyles moved to Gateshead in March 1948. He scored a total of 7 goals in 251 appearances in league and cup competitions for Gateshead between 1948 and 1954.

== Sources ==
- "allfootballers.com". Archived from the original on 5 April 2010.
- "Post War English & Scottish Football League A–Z Player's Transfer Database".
