= Archie Whyte =

Scottish footballer (1919–1973)

Personal information
- Full name: John Archibald Whyte
- Date of birth: 17 July 1919
- Place of birth: Redding, Falkirk, Scotland
- Date of death: 1 October 1973 (aged 54)
- Place of death: Middleton, England
- Position: Centre half

Senior career*
Years	Team	Apps	(Gls)
	Armadale Thistle	?	(?)
1946–1949	Barnsley	91	(2)
1950–1956	Oldham Athletic	234	(0)
Total		325	(2)
- * Club domestic league appearances and goals

John Archibald Whyte (17 July 1919 – 1 October 1973) was a Scottish footballer who played as a centre half in the Football League for Barnsley and Oldham Athletic.
