= Eric Goodwin =

English footballer

Personal information
- Full name: Eric Goodwin
- Date of birth: 6 March 1929
- Place of birth: Chesterfield, England
- Date of death: 2012 (aged 82–83)
- Position: Central defender

Senior career*
| Years | Team | Apps | (Gls) |
| 1951–1952 | Coventry City | 0 | (0) |
| 1952–1953 | St Aidan Stags | | |
| 1953–1955 | Mansfield Town | 9 | (0) |
| Total | | 9 | (0) |
- * Club domestic league appearances and goals

Eric Goodwin (6 March 1929 – 2012) was an English professional footballer who played in the Football League for Mansfield Town.
