= Jimmy Wilson (footballer, born 1929) =

Scottish footballer (1929–2017)

Personal information
- Full name: James Wilson
- Date of birth: 19 December 1929
- Place of birth: Glasgow, Scotland
- Date of death: 2017 (aged 87–88)
- Place of death: Glasgow, Scotland
- Position: Winger

Senior career*
| Years | Team | Apps | (Gls) |
| 1951–1952 | Duntocher Hibernian | | |
| 1952–1953 | Alloa Athletic | | |
| 1954–1955 | Leicester City | 0 | (0) |
| 1955–1957 | Mansfield Town | 19 | (1) |
| 1957 | Alloa Athletic | | |
| 1958 | Dundee United | | |
| Total | | 19 | (1) |
- * Club domestic league appearances and goals

James Wilson (19 December 1929 – 2017) was a Scottish professional footballer who played in the Football League for Mansfield Town.
