= Vaughan Watson =

English footballer

Personal information
- Full name: Vaughan Watson
- Date of birth: 5 November 1931
- Place of birth: Mansfield, England
- Date of death: 10 December 1984 (aged 53)
- Place of death: Mansfield, England
- Position: Centre forward

Senior career*
Years	Team	Apps	(Gls)
1951–1952	Mansfield West End		
1952–1954	Mansfield Town	14	(9)
1954–1955	Chesterfield	13	(5)
1955	Ransome & Marles		
Total		27	(14)
- * Club domestic league appearances and goals

Vaughan Watson (5 November 1931 – 10 December 1984) was an English professional footballer who played in the Football League for Chesterfield and Mansfield Town.
