= Brian Lambert (footballer, born 1936) =

English footballer

Personal information
- Date of birth: 10 July 1936
- Place of birth: Sutton-in-Ashfield, England
- Date of death: 27 December 2007 (aged 71)
- Place of death: Kirkby-in-Ashfield, England
- Position: Full-back

Senior career*
Years	Team	Apps	(Gls)
1954–1960	Mansfield Town	24	(0)
- * Club domestic league appearances and goals

Brian Lambert (10 July 1936 − 27 December 2007) was an English footballer who played professionally at Mansfield Town as a full-back between 1954 and 1960. Lambert played mostly for the Stags' reserve team, and made only 28 appearances for the first team in his six years at Field Mill.

As a youngster, Lambert was briefly connected to Derby County as an amateur, but never played for the Rams at first-team level. He joined Mansfield from non-league neighbours Sutton Town in October 1954, and rejoined Sutton when he left the Stags in 1960. After his retirement from professional football, he worked as a window cleaner in Ashfield.

He died in December 2007, aged 71.
