= Roger McDonald (footballer) =

Scottish football player

Personal information
- Full name: Roger Brown McDonald
- Date of birth: 2 February 1933
- Place of birth: Glasgow, Scotland
- Date of death: 22 October 1996 (aged 63)
- Place of death: Glasgow, Scotland
- Position: Full back

Senior career*
Years	Team	Apps	(Gls)
1953–1954	St Mirren		
1954–1956	Mansfield Town	13	(0)
1956–1957	Cheltenham Town		
1957	Crystal Palace	0	(0)
Total		13	(0)
- * Club domestic league appearances and goals

Roger Brown McDonald (2 February 1933 – 22 October 1996) was a Scottish professional footballer who played in the English Football League for Mansfield Town.
