= Chris Marron =

English footballer

Personal information
- Full name: Christopher Marron
- Date of birth: 7 February 1925
- Place of birth: Jarrow, England
- Date of death: 11th June 1986
- Place of death: Mansfield, England
- Position: Centre forward

Senior career*
Years	Team	Apps	(Gls)
–1947	South Shields		
1947–1952	Chesterfield	108	(44)
1952–1954	Mansfield Town	53	(25)
1955–1955	Bradford Park Avenue	2	(1)
- Heanor Town

Managerial career
- Heanor Town
- * Club domestic league appearances and goals

Christopher Marron (7 February 1925 – June 1986) was an English professional footballer. A centre forward, he scored 70 goals in 163 matches in the Football League, and also holds the record for the most goals in an FA Cup match, having scored ten in a preliminary round match in September 1947.

== Career ==
Born in Jarrow, Marron was playing for North Eastern League club South Shields when he scored ten goals in a preliminary round match against Radcliffe Welfare United in the 1947–48 FA Cup, a record for the competition. (Note: Ted MacDougall of A.F.C. Bournemouth holds the record (9) for the most goals scored in the non-qualifying rounds.) The record was equalled by Paul Jackson of Stocksbridge Park Steels in 2002 when they beat Oldham Town 17–1.

Shortly afterwards Marron signed for Second Division Chesterfield. He made his debut on 11 October 1947 in a 0–0 draw against Birmingham City and went on to play 108 league games for the club, scoring 44 goals. The club were relegated to the Third Division North at the end of the 1951–52 season, with Marron's last game for the club coming on 26 April 1952, a 2–2 draw with Bradford City.

Marron subsequently signed for Chesterfield's local rivals Mansfield Town. He was top scorer in his first season at the club, scoring 16 times. He also played in goal in a game against Barrow after the team's goalkeeper broke his wrist; during the match Marron saved a penalty. By the end of the following season he had scored 25 goals in 53 matches. He then left to join Bradford Park Avenue for the 1954–55 season. However, he only played two league matches for his new club before leaving to become player-manager of Heanor Town, then playing in the Central Alliance.

Marron lived in Mansfield until his death on June 11th 1986.
