= Eric Ryan =

English footballer

Personal information
- Full name: Eric William Ryan
- Date of birth: 6 January 1933
- Place of birth: Oswestry, England
- Date of death: 2017 (aged 83–84)
- Position: Full back

Senior career*
| Years | Team | Apps | (Gls) |
| 1950–1954 | Oswestry Town | | |
| 1954–1957 | Mansfield Town | 20 | (0) |
| Total | | 20 | (0) |
- * Club domestic league appearances and goals

Eric William Ryan (6 January 1933 – 2017) was an English professional footballer who played in the Football League for Mansfield Town.
