= William Hudson (footballer) =

Welsh footballer

Billy Hudson
Personal information
- Full name: William Albert Hudson
- Date of birth: 10 March 1928
- Place of birth: Swansea, Wales
- Date of death: February 2014
- Place of death: Swansea, Wales
- Position: Outside right

Senior career*
Years	Team	Apps	(Gls)
1951	Pembroke Borough		
1951–1952	Leeds United	4	(0)
1952–1954	Sheffield United	1	(0)
1954–1955	Mansfield Town	8	(1)
- * Club domestic league appearances and goals

William Albert Hudson (10 March 1928 – February 2014 ) was a Welsh footballer who played in the Football League for Leeds United, Sheffield United and Mansfield Town in the 1950s as an outside right.

After coming out of the armed forces he joined Pembroke Borough. He made four league appearances for Leeds United before leaving for Sheffield United in May 1952, where he played briefly, and was signed by Mansfield Town in May 1954. He was released a free transfer in 1955 after eight league appearances.

His uncle, Albert Hudson, was a former Fulham, Llanelly and Pembroke player.
