= Willie Donaldson (footballer) =

Scottish footballer

Personal information
- Full name: William Donaldson
- Date of birth: 20 January 1920
- Place of birth: Wallacetown, Scotland
- Date of death: 9 January 1977 (aged 56)
- Position: Winger

Senior career*
Years	Team	Apps	(Gls)
1938–1946	Leith Athletic		
1946–1950	Bradford Park Avenue	45	(6)
1950–1952	Mansfield Town	52	(10)
1952	Grantham		
Total		97	(16)
- * Club domestic league appearances and goals

William Donaldson (20 January 1920 – 9 January 1977) was a Scottish professional footballer who played in the Football League for Bradford Park Avenue and Mansfield Town.
