= James Lill =

English footballer

Personal information
- Full name: James Alfred Lill
- Date of birth: 4 June 1933
- Place of birth: Barnsley, England
- Date of death: 10 Mar 2008, (age 74) Rotherham
- Position: Inside forward

Senior career*
Years	Team	Apps	(Gls)
1953	Wentworth		
1953–1956	Mansfield Town	3	(0)
Total		3	(0)
- * Club domestic league appearances and goals

James Alfred Lill (4 June 1933 – 10 March 2008) was an English professional footballer who played in the Football League for Mansfield Town.
