= Reg Warner =

English footballer

Personal information
- Full name: Reginald Owen Warner
- Date of birth: 1 March 1931
- Place of birth: Anstey, England
- Date of death: 1996 (aged 64–65)
- Position: Central defender

Senior career*
| Years | Team | Apps | (Gls) |
| 1947–1948 | Anstey Methodists | | |
| 1948–1952 | Anstey Nomads | | |
| 1952–1954 | Leicester City | 7 | (0) |
| 1954–1957 | Mansfield Town | 33 | (0) |
| 1957 | Hinckley Athletic | | |
| Total | | 40 | (0) |
- * Club domestic league appearances and goals

Reginald Owen Warner (1 March 1931 – 1996) was an English professional footballer who played in the Football League for Leicester City and Mansfield Town.
