= Andy Geddes (footballer, born 1922) =

Scottish footballer

Personal information
- Full name: Andrew Geddes
- Date of birth: 6 September 1922
- Place of birth: Motherwell, Scotland
- Date of death: 2 February 1958 (aged 35)
- Place of death: New Cumnock, Scotland
- Position: Wing half

Senior career*
Years	Team	Apps	(Gls)
- Kilmarnock
- St Cuthbert Wanderers
1949–1951	Bradford City	30	(4)
1951–1952	Mansfield Town	11	(2)
1952–1955	Halifax Town	50	(4)
- Glenafton Athletic
Total		91	(10)
- * Club domestic league appearances and goals

Andrew Geddes (6 September 1922 – 2 February 1958) was a Scottish professional footballer, who played as a wing half.

== Career ==
Born in Motherwell, Geddes played for Kilmarnock, St Cuthbert Wanderers, Bradford City, Mansfield Town, Halifax Town and Glenafton Athletic.

For Bradford City he made 30 appearances in the Football League; he also made 2 FA Cup appearances.

== Sources ==
- Frost, Terry (1988). Bradford City A Complete Record 1903–1988. Breedon Books Sport. ISBN 0-907969-38-0.
