= Oscar Fox Sr. =

English footballer

Oscar Fox
Personal information
- Date of birth: 29 July 1892
- Place of birth: Sheffield, England
- Date of death: October 1946 (aged 54)
- Place of death: Sheffield, England
- Height: 5 ft 8 1/2 in (1.74 m)
- Position: Inside right

Senior career*
Years	Team	Apps	(Gls)
- Castleford Town
1910–1922	Bradford City	164	(57)
- * Club domestic league appearances and goals

Oscar Fox (29 July 1892 – October 1946) was an English footballer who played inside right for Castleford Town and Bradford City. His son, also named Oscar, was also a professional footballer.

== Career ==
Oscar Fox was born in Sheffield. He was playing for Castleford Town when he was spotted by Bradford City in November 1910, making his debut on 18 February 1911 against Oldham Athletic. He made two more appearances in the 1910–11, which remains the club's most successful season. He made just 11 appearances the following season, scoring three goals.

For the following three seasons he was the club's top league goal-scorer as he formed a successful partnership with Dicky Bond. The club could not repeat its success of Fox's first season, but his goals helped to keep City in Division One. He played two more full seasons after the war, before making one final appearance in 1921–22. It proved to be the club's last in the top flight for 77 years. His career finished with a benefit match against Middlesbrough when he made £540.

== Personal life and death ==
He returned to his Sheffield home, where he worked in a billiards hall. He died in Nether Edge Hospital, Sheffield, Yorkshire, England in October 1946, aged 54, the same year his son, also called Oscar, had started his own career for Sheffield Wednesday. He played for Wednesday and Mansfield Town more than 300 times as a wing-half.
