= Joe Eaton (footballer) =

English footballer (1931–2025)

Personal information
- Full name: Joseph David Eaton
- Date of birth: 16 May 1931
- Place of birth: Cuckney, England
- Date of death: April 2025 (aged 93)
- Position: Inside forward

Senior career*
| Years | Team | Apps | (Gls) |
| 1952 | Langwith Boys Club | | |
| 1952–1954 | Mansfield Town | 4 | (1) |
| Total | | 4 | (1) |
- * Club domestic league appearances and goals

Joseph David Eaton (16 May 1931 – April 2025) was an English professional footballer who played as an inside forward in the Football League for Mansfield Town. Eaton died in April 2025, at the age of 93.
