= Charlie Adam (footballer, born 1919) =

Scottish footballer (1919–1996)

Personal information
- Full name: Charles Adam
- Date of birth: 22 March 1919
- Place of birth: Glasgow, Scotland
- Date of death: 30 September 1996 (aged 77)
- Place of death: Kirby Muxloe, Leicestershire, England
- Position: Outside left

Youth career
- Greenhead Thistle

Senior career*
Years	Team	Apps	(Gls)
1936–1938	Strathclyde		
1938–1952	Leicester City	158	(22)
1952–1954	Mansfield Town	94	(7)
- * Club domestic league appearances and goals

Charles Adam (22 March 1919 – 30 September 1996) was a Scottish professional footballer who played for Strathclyde, Leicester City and Mansfield Town.

He scored Leicester's first post-war goal and was part of the side who finished FA Cup runners-up in 1949.

After retiring from football, he managed Leicester's youth team for 16 years between 1960 and 1976, winning the national FA youth trophy in 1966, with players such as David Nish and Rodney Fern.

== Honours ==
Leicester City

- FA Cup runner-up: 1948–49
