= Mount Humble =

Mountain in Antarctica

Mount Humble (67°40′S 49°29′E) is, at 1,450 metres (4,760 ft), the highest mountain in the Raggatt Mountains of Antarctica, standing 16 miles (26 km) south of the isolated mountain Mount Sibiryakov. It was plotted from air photos taken by the Australian National Antarctic Research Expeditions in 1956, and was named by the Antarctic Names Committee of Australia for John Edmund Humble, a cosmic ray physicist at Mawson Station in 1960.
