= Willie McGregor =

Scottish footballer (1923–2015

Personal information
- Full name: William McGregor
- Date of birth: 1 December 1923
- Place of birth: Paisley, Scotland
- Date of death: November 2015 (aged 91)
- Position: Full back

Senior career*
Years	Team	Apps	(Gls)
1946–1947	Mossdale YMCA		
1947–1952	Leicester City	9	(0)
1953–1956	Mansfield Town	119	(0)
1956	Corby Town		
Total		128	(0)
- * Club domestic league appearances and goals

William McGregor (1 December 1923 – November 2015) was a Scottish professional footballer who played in the Football League for Leicester City and Mansfield Town.
