= Arthur Bramley =

English footballer (1929–2021)

Personal information
- Full name: Arthur Bramley
- Date of birth: 29 March 1929
- Place of birth: Mansfield, England
- Date of death: 10 January 2021 (aged 91)
- Position: Goalkeeper

Senior career*
Years	Team	Apps	(Gls)
1948	Bentinck Colliery Welfare		
1948–1953	Mansfield Town	19	(0)
Total		19	(0)
- * Club domestic league appearances and goals

Arthur Bramley (25 March 1929 – 10 January 2021) was an English professional footballer who played in the Football League for Mansfield Town.

He died in January 2021 at the age of 90.
