= Norman Field (footballer) =

English footballer

Personal information
- Full name: Norman Field
- Date of birth: 27 August 1927
- Place of birth: Durham, England
- Date of death: 1993 (aged 65–66)
- Position: Wing half

Senior career*
Years	Team	Apps	(Gls)
1945–1946	Portsmouth	0	(0)
1951–1953	Mansfield Town	20	(0)
Total		20	(0)
- * Club domestic league appearances and goals

Norman Field (27 August 1927 – 1993) was an English professional footballer who played in the Football League for Mansfield Town.
