= Ken Murray (footballer) =

English footballer (1928–1993)

Personal information
- Full name: Kenneth Murray
- Date of birth: 8 April 1928
- Place of birth: Darlington, England
- Date of death: 8 January 1993 (aged 64)
- Place of death: Newcastle upon Tyne, England
- Position: Forward

Senior career*
Years	Team	Apps	(Gls)
	Bishop Auckland	?	(?)
1950–1953	Darlington	70	(19)
1953–1957	Mansfield Town	140	(60)
1957–1958	Oldham Athletic	35	(14)
1958–1959	Wrexham	32	(10)
1959–1960	Gateshead	18	(7)
	Ashington	?	(?)
Total		295	(110)
- * Club domestic league appearances and goals

Kenneth Murray (2 April 1928 – 8 January 1993) was an English footballer who played as a forward in the Football League.
