= Ray Evans (footballer, born 1927) =

English footballer

Personal information
- Full name: Raymond Evans
- Date of birth: 27 November 1927
- Place of birth: Mansfield, England
- Date of death: 2010 (aged 82–83)
- Position: Forward

Senior career*
Years	Team	Apps	(Gls)
1948–1949	Coventry City	0	(0)
1949	Stafford Rangers		
1949–1953	Mansfield Town	39	(12)
1954	Stockport County	0	(0)
Total		39	(12)
- * Club domestic league appearances and goals

Raymond Evans (27 November 1927 – 2010) was an English professional footballer who played in the Football League for Mansfield Town.
