= Alan Daley =

English footballer

Personal information
- Date of birth: 11 October 1927
- Place of birth: Mansfield, England
- Date of death: 2008 (aged 80–81)
- Position: Winger

Senior career*
Years	Team	Apps	(Gls)
1946–1947	Mansfield Town	0	(0)
1947–1948	Hull City	7	(0)
1948–1949	Bangor City		
1949	Worksop Town		
1949–1950	Doncaster Rovers	1	(1)
1950–1951	Peterborough United		
1951–1952	Boston United		
1952–1953	Scunthorpe United	35	(8)
1953–1954	Corby Town		
1954–1956	Mansfield Town	97	(25)
1956–1958	Stockport County	73	(17)
1958–1959	Crewe Alexandra	14	(1)
1958–1961	Coventry City	56	(10)
1961	Cambridge United		
Total		283	(62)
- * Club domestic league appearances and goals

Alan Daley (11 October 1927 – 2008) is an English former footballer who played in the Football League for Hull City, Doncaster Rovers, Scunthorpe United, Mansfield Town, Stockport County, Crewe Alexandra and Coventry City.
