= Jack Lewis (footballer, born 1923) =

English footballer

Personal information
- Full name: John Lewis
- Date of birth: 6 October 1923
- Place of birth: Walsall, England
- Date of death: 2002 (aged 78–79)
- Position: Wing half

Senior career*
Years	Team	Apps	(Gls)
1945–1946	West Bromwich Albion	0	(0)
1948–1953	Mansfield Town	163	(11)
1953	Hereford United		
Total		63	(11)
- * Club domestic league appearances and goals

John Lewis (6 October 1923 – 2002) was an English professional footballer who played in the Football League for Mansfield Town.
