= Norman Plummer =

English footballer and Royal Air Force officer

Personal information
- Full name: Norman Leonard Plummer
- Date of birth: 12 January 1924
- Place of birth: Leicester, England
- Date of death: 25 October 1999 (aged 75)
- Place of death: Leicester, England
- Positions: Centre-forward; centre-half

Senior career*
| Years | Team | Apps | (Gls) |
| 1942–1952 | Leicester City | 66 | (1) |
| 1952–1956 | Mansfield Town | 166 | (5) |
| 1956–19?? | Kettering Town | | |
- * Club domestic league appearances and goals

Norman Leonard Plummer (12 January 1924 – 25 October 1999) was a Royal Air Force officer and English footballer.

During the Second World War, Plummer served with the RAF, serving in the Far East and in Europe as a navigator in the Lancaster bombers.

After the war, he signed professional forms with Leicester City FC and established himself as a regular in the side at first as centre-forward, but eventually centre-half. He became captain of the side during the 1948–49 season, under John Duncan, and led Leicester City to their first cup final appearance, defeating the favourites Portsmouth F. C. 3–1 in the semi-final at Highbury. On 30 April 1949, Norman achieved his childhood dream of captaining Leicester City in their first-ever FA Cup Final appearance at Wembley, against Wolverhampton Wanderers, led by the great Billy Wright in front of a capacity 100,000-strong crowd. Leicester were the underdogs against a strong Wolves side, and eventually lost 3–1. After several more seasons at Leicester, Norman moved on to Mansfield Town, and finally ended his career at Kettering Town in the early 1960s.

Once he retired from football, he ran the family shop on Victoria Road East, Leicester for many years until he retired. During his retirement he was a well-known member of the RAFA and a regular at Glen Gorse Golf Club.

He died on 25 October 1999, after a battle with cancer. He left behind his wife of 50 years Peggy, three children and five grandchildren.

== Honours ==
Leicester City

- FA Cup runner-up: 1948–49
