= Les Mayfield (footballer) =

English footballer

Personal information
- Full name: Leslie Mayfield
- Date of birth: 19 January 1926
- Place of birth: Mansfield, England
- Date of death: 2014 (aged 87–88)
- Position: Full back

Senior career*
Years	Team	Apps	(Gls)
1949–1953	Mansfield Town	34	(0)
1953	Sutton Town		
1953	Gainsborough Trinity		
Total		34	(0)
- * Club domestic league appearances and goals

Leslie Mayfield (19 January 1926 – 2014) was an English professional footballer who played in the Football League for Mansfield Town.
