= Sammy Chessell =

English footballer

Personal information
- Full name: Samuel Chessell
- Date of birth: 9 July 1921
- Place of birth: Shirebrook, England
- Date of death: 14 March 1996 (aged 74)
- Place of death: Shirebrook, England
- Position: Full-back

Senior career*
Years	Team	Apps	(Gls)
1945–1954	Mansfield Town	256	(7)
- * Club domestic league appearances and goals

Samuel Chessell (9 July 1921 – 14 March 1996) was an English footballer who played for Mansfield Town as a right-back. A native of nearby Shirebrook, he joined Mansfield in 1942 as a forward, and played 62 wartime matches for the Stags, scoring ten goals.

When the war came to an end, Chessell, by now converted to a full-back, played his first "official" match for Mansfield on 17 November 1945 against Gainsborough Trinity in the FA Cup. He scored his first peacetime goal for the club in a league match against Leyton Orient near the end of the 1946–47 season.

Chessell was ever-present in the 1950–51 season, forming a fine full-back partnership with Don Bradley, when Mansfield finished second in Division Three North and reached the fifth round of the FA Cup. He suffered a broken leg on Christmas Day 1951 against Hartlepools United, but recovered in time for his testimonial against Derby County in April 1952.

Chessell left Mansfield in August 1954, having played 281 peacetime games for the club, scoring seven goals. He later settled in his home village of Shirebrook where he worked at the local colliery. He died in March 1996, aged 74.
