= Sid Ottewell =

English footballer and manager (1919–2012

Personal information
- Full name: Sidney Ottewell
- Date of birth: 23 October 1919
- Place of birth: Holbrook, England
- Date of death: 31 January 2012 (aged 92)
- Place of death: Nottingham, England
- Height: 5 ft 8 in (1.73 m)
- Position: Inside forward

Senior career*
Years	Team	Apps	(Gls)
–	Holbrook Colliery Welfare		
1936–1947	Chesterfield	42	(12)
1947	Birmingham City	5	(2)
1947–1948	Luton Town	15	(4)
1948–1950	Nottingham Forest	32	(3)
1950–1952	Mansfield Town	67	(21)
1952–1953	Scunthorpe United	30	(12)
–	Spalding United		
–	Heanor Town		
1958–1960	Bourne Town	9	(4)

Managerial career
- –: Spalding United (player-manager)
- 1958–1960: Bourne Town (player-manager)
- 1960–1969: Lockheed Leamington
- * Club domestic league appearances and goals

Sidney Ottewell (23 October 1919 – 31 January 2012) was an English professional footballer who scored 54 goals from 191 appearances in the Football League, playing for Chesterfield, Birmingham City, Luton Town, Nottingham Forest, Mansfield Town and Scunthorpe United. He played as an inside forward.

== Playing career ==
Ottewell was born in Holbrook, Derbyshire, and captained the Derbyshire Schools football team. He began his senior career with Holbrook Colliery Welfare before joining Chesterfield in 1936. He made his debut in the Second Division as a 17-year-old, on 3 April 1937 in a 4–0 defeat at home to Blackburn Rovers. During the Second World War, Ottewell served as a Physical Training Instructor in the Royal Air Force, and made guest appearances for clubs including Birmingham, Blackburn Rovers, Blackpool, Bradford City, Chester, Fulham and Tottenham Hotspur.

After the war he remained with Chesterfield until June 1947 when he joined Birmingham City. He played five Second Division games in a variety of positions, and scored twice in a 4–3 defeat of Bradford (Park Avenue) in November 1947, but in December he was allowed to leave for Luton Town, where he finished off the 1947–48 season in the Third Division South. Ottewell then signed for Nottingham Forest, who were relegated from the Second Division at the end of his first season with the club. He left for Mansfield Town in January 1950 for what the Nottingham Evening News reported as "a four-figure fee", and helped the club to runners-up spot in the Third Division North in his first full season. In March 1952 Ottewell joined his final Football League club, Scunthorpe & Lindsey United, establishing himself immediately in the first team, but his appearances became more infrequent in the 1952–53 season, and he retired in 1953.

== Managerial career ==
Ottewell moved into non-league football as player-manager of Spalding United, and later held a coaching role while a player at Heanor Town.

Ottewell joined Bourne Town as player-manager for the 1958–59 season, their first in the Central Alliance Division One South. After an 11th place finish, his strengthened squad won the 1959–60 divisional title. He would play 9 league games and score 4 goals, including a hat-trick against Kings Lynn Reserves.

He was appointed manager of Lockheed Leamington prior to the 1960–61 season. He led the club to successive championships of the Birmingham & District League in 1961–62, when they also won the Birmingham Senior Cup, and 1962–63, this time combined only with losing in the Senior Cup final, at which point they joined the Midland League. After guiding the team to third place in their first season at the higher level, Ottewell led them to the Midland League title in 1964–65. He remained manager until January 1969, tenure which made him the longest-serving Leamington manager of the modern era.

== Personal life ==
Ottewell was married to Eileen from 1947 until her death in 2006. They had two children, Peter and Carole. The couple lived in Wollaton, Nottinghamshire, but in later life moved to nearby Newthorpe. In October 2009, when he celebrated his 90th birthday, he had numerous grandchildren and great-grandchildren, and was believed to be the oldest living former Nottingham Forest player. He died in an Eastwood nursing home on 31 January 2012 at the age of 92.
