= Ken Reeve =

English footballer

Personal information
- Full name: Kenneth Eric Reeve
- Date of birth: 13 January 1921
- Place of birth: Grimsby, England
- Date of death: 20 May 2005 (aged 84)
- Place of death: Saltfleet, England
- Position: Inside forward

Senior career*
Years	Team	Apps	(Gls)
1937–1938	Humber United		
1938–1948	Grimsby Town	24	(5)
1948–1949	Doncaster Rovers	30	(12)
1949–1954	Mansfield Town	139	(62)
1954–195?	Gainsborough Trinity		
- * Club domestic league appearances and goals

Kenneth Eric Reeve (13 January 1921 – 20 May 2005) was an English professional footballer who played in the Football League for Mansfield Town, Doncaster Rovers and Grimsby Town as an inside forward.
