= Billy Coole =

English footballer

Personal information
- Full name: William Coole
- Date of birth: 27 January 1925
- Place of birth: Manchester, England
- Date of death: 12 April 2001 (aged 76)
- Place of death: Sale, England
- Position: Winger

Senior career*
Years	Team	Apps	(Gls)
1947–1953	Mansfield Town	182	(35)
1953–1956	Notts County	42	(5)
1956–1959	Barrow	56	(4)
- Wigan Rovers
Total		280	(44)
- * Club domestic league appearances and goals

William Coole (27 January 1927 – 12 April 2001) was an English professional footballer who played in the Football League for Mansfield Town, Notts County and Barrow.

He joined Wigan Rovers in 1959.
