= Eddie Barks =

English footballer (1921–1989)

Personal information
- Full name: Edwin Barks
- Date of birth: 1 September 1921
- Place of birth: Heanor, England
- Date of death: March 1989 (aged 67)
- Position: Wing half

Senior career*
Years	Team	Apps	(Gls)
1939–1949	Nottingham Forest	66	(5)
1949–1955	Mansfield Town	213	(6)
- * Club domestic league appearances and goals

Edwin "Eddie" Barks (1 September 1921 – March 1989) was an English footballer who played in the English Football League as a wing-half for Nottingham Forest and Mansfield Town. Eddie was born in Heanor Derbyshire at Midland Road the fourth of five sons (Fred, Tom, Horace, Eddie and the youngest Reg, who was killed in a pit accident in 1943 aged 17). His older brother Tom died in a POW camp in Japan.

As a teenager, Barks caught the eye of Nottingham Forest manager Billy Walker while playing for non-league Heanor Town, and signed for Forest as a 17-year-old in April 1939. However, because of the war, he had to wait until 1945 before making his debut for the club in official competition.

Barks remained at the City Ground until January 1949, when he moved to Mansfield Town for a £1,000 transfer fee. He scored on his Mansfield debut against Darlington on 29 January 1949. Described as a wholehearted and hard-working wing-half, Barks gave Mansfield excellent service for seven seasons. He was a member of the side that finished second in Division Three North in 1950–51, and reached the fifth round of the FA Cup the same season before eventually bowing out against Stanley Matthews' Blackpool.

Barks retired from football at the end of the 1954–55 season, having played 225 first-team games for the Stags, scoring seven goals. He died in 1989.
