= Oscar Fox Jr. =

English footballer

Oscar Fox
Personal information
- Date of birth: 1 January 1921
- Place of birth: Clowne, Derbyshire, England
- Date of death: 15 January 1990 (aged 69)
- Position: Wing half

Senior career*
Years	Team	Apps	(Gls)
1946–1950	Sheffield Wednesday	44	(3)
1950–1957	Mansfield Town	248	(30)
- * Club domestic league appearances and goals

Oscar Fox (1 January 1921 – 15 January 1990) was an English footballer who played for Sheffield Wednesday and Mansfield Town primarily as a wing-half, but also sometimes as an inside-forward. He was the son of pre-war footballer Oscar Fox senior.

Fox began his career at Sheffield Wednesday, where he signed in October 1943, and made his peacetime first-team debut during the 1946–47 season. He played a total of 47 matches for the Owls, scoring four goals. In June 1950, he moved to Mansfield Town.

In his debut season for Mansfield, Fox was a member of the team that finished second in Division Three North, and was a regular member of the side for the next five years. In 1951–52, he scored a career-best ten goals.

Fox remained at Mansfield for the rest of his career, retiring from the game in May 1958, having played a total of 258 games for the Stags, scoring 34 goals. He was appointed assistant to manager Sam Weaver the following month, and remained in that role until Weaver was sacked in January 1960.
