= Don Bradley =

English footballer

Personal information
- Full name: Donald John Bradley
- Date of birth: 11 September 1924
- Place of birth: Annesley, England
- Date of death: 26 June 1997 (aged 72)
- Position: Defender

Senior career*
Years	Team	Apps	(Gls)
1945–1949	West Bromwich Albion	0	(0)
1949–1962	Mansfield Town	384	(6)
- * Club domestic league appearances and goals

Donald Bradley (11 September 1924 – 26 June 1997) was an English footballer who played for Mansfield Town as a left-back. A native of Annesley in Nottinghamshire, Bradley began his career at West Bromwich Albion in 1945, but never made any league appearances for them. In 1949, he joined Mansfield Town, and made his debut on 20 August 1949 in a Division Three North match against Southport.

At a 13-year spell at the club, Bradley is one of Mansfield's longest-serving players of all time. In total he played a total of 413 matches, scoring six goals for the club. His last game for Mansfield came on 23 October 1961 in a League Cup tie against Cardiff City at Ninian Park where Mansfield lost 2–1. He left Mansfield at the end of the 1961–62 season, and subsequently played a couple of seasons for non-league Ilkeston Town before retiring from playing the game.

He continued to work in football into his 60s, including a role as a boys football coach at Oldswinford Hospital School in the West Midlands.

He died in June 1997, at the age of 72.
