= 1947–48 Mansfield Town F.C. season =

Mansfield Town
1947–48 season
- Manager: Roy Goodall
- Stadium: Field Mill
- Third Division North: 8th
- FA Cup: Third Round
until December colours	from December colours

The 1947–48 season was Mansfield Town's tenth season in the Football League and sixth season in the Third Division North, they finished in 8th position with 45 points.

== Final league table ==
Pos	Team	Pld	W	D	L	GF	GA	GAv	Pts
6	Accrington Stanley	42	20	6	16	62	59	1.051	46
7	Barrow	42	16	13	13	49	40	1.225	45
8	Mansfield Town	42	17	11	14	57	51	1.118	45
9	Carlisle United	42	18	7	17	88	77	1.143	43
10	Crewe Alexandra	42	18	7	17	61	63	0.968	43

Source: rsssf.com

== Results ==
=== Football League Third Division North ===
Match	Date	Opponent	Venue	Result	Attendance	Scorers
1	23 August 1947	York City	H	1–2	9,695	Croft
2	27 August 1947	Crewe Alexandra	A	0–0	7,810	
3	30 August 1947	Oldham Athletic	A	1–1	14,336	Hogg
4	1 September 1947	Crewe Alexandra	H	3–1	10,043	Croft (2), Oscroft
5	6 September 1947	Tranmere Rovers	H	1–3	10,187	Oscroft
6	8 September 1947	Carlisle United	H	3–2	8,272	Hogg, Chadbourne
7	13 September 1947	Darlington	A	2–1	6,936	Bryant, Chessell
8	20 September 1947	Gateshead	H	1–2	9,879	Cooling
9	27 September 1947	Hartlepools United	A	0–1	7,497	
10	4 October 1947	Rotherham United	H	2–1	13,886	Bryant, Oscroft
11	11 October 1947	Halifax Town	A	1–1	6,713	Shell
12	18 October 1947	Rochdale	H	1–1	12,268	Oscroft
13	25 October 1947	New Brighton	A	2–2	5,540	Oscroft, Croft
14	1 November 1947	Southport	H	2–0	11,260	Cooling, Brown
15	8 November 1947	Lincoln City	A	0–0	15,127	
16	15 November 1947	Accrington Stanley	H	1–0	12,527	Oscroft
17	22 November 1947	Hull City	A	1–1	20,677	Brown
18	6 December 1947	Bradford City	A	1–0	9,322	Banks
19	20 December 1947	York City	A	2–1	5,863	Banks, Butt
20	26 December 1947	Wrexham	A	1–2	17,633	Banks
21	27 December 1947	Wrexham	H	1–0	13,128	Banks
22	1 January 1948	Carlisle United	A	1–3	9,997	Edwards
23	3 January 1948	Oldham Athletic	H	1–1	12,824	Banks
24	17 January 1948	Tranmere Rovers	A	1–0	4,390	Devey
25	24 January 1948	Barrow	H	1–0	10,701	Oscroft
26	31 January 1948	Darlington	H	4–0	11,605	Oscroft, Banks (2), Edwards
27	7 February 1948	Gateshead	A	1–2	9,718	Cooling
28	14 February 1948	Hartlepools United	H	3–2	13,326	Edwards, Oscroft, Banks
29	28 February 1948	Halifax Town	H	3–1	10,664	Banks (3)
30	6 March 1948	Rochdale	A	2–1	10,664	Butt, Cooling
31	13 March 1948	New Brighton	H	5–0	10,886	Butt (2), Cooling, Banks, Oscroft
32	20 March 1948	Southport	A	1–1	7,032	Croft
33	26 March 1948	Chester	A	2–1	11,209	Croft, Banks
34	27 March 1948	Lincoln City	H	0–2	18,863	
35	29 March 1948	Chester	H	2–1	12,770	Banks, Edwards
36	3 April 1948	Accrington Stanley	A	0–1	4,622	
37	5 April 1948	Stockport County	H	1–2	12,760	Coole
38	10 April 1948	Hull City	H	1–1	11,098	Oscroft
39	12 April 1948	Rotherham United	A	1–2	20,522	Cooling
40	17 April 1948	Stockport County	A	0–5	11,039	
41	24 April 1948	Bradford City	H	1–1	6,799	Cooling
42	1 May 1948	Barrow	A	0–1	5,431	

=== FA Cup ===
Round	Date	Opponent	Venue	Result	Attendance	Scorers
R1	29 November 1947	Wimbledon	A	1–0	9,823	Cooling
R2	13 December 1947	Oldham Athletic	A	1–0	22,067	Cooling
R2	10 January 1948	Stoke City	H	2–4	10,529	Oscroft, Butt

== Squad statistics ==
- Squad list sourced from 1947–48 Mansfield Town F.C. season at the English National Football Archive (subscription required)

Pos.	Name	League		FA Cup		Total	
Pos.	Name	Apps	Goals	Apps	Goals	Apps	Goals
GK	(England) Harry Searson	27	0	3	0	30	0
GK	(England) Dennis Wright	15	0	0	0	15	0
DF	(England) Ernest Bramley	4	0	0	0	4	0
DF	(England) Sammy Chessell	22	1	2	0	24	1
DF	(England) Bill Dallman	1	0	0	0	1	0
DF	(England) Walter Fox	27	0	1	0	28	0
DF	(Scotland) Johnny Grogan	34	0	3	0	37	0
DF	(Wales) David Jones	33	0	3	0	36	0
MF	(England) Gordon Baird	1	0	0	0	1	0
MF	(England) Charlie Croft	40	5	3	0	43	5
MF	(England) Ray Devey	41	1	3	0	44	1
MF	(England) Les Smith	10	0	0	0	10	0
FW	(England) Ken Allcock	1	0	0	0	1	0
FW	(England) George Banks	27	14	3	0	30	14
FW	(England) Roy Brown	17	2	1	0	18	2
FW	(England) Eric Bryant	7	2	0	0	7	2
FW	(England) Len Butt	15	4	2	1	17	5
FW	(England) William Chadbourne	3	1	0	0	3	1
FW	(England) Colin Cochrane	1	0	0	0	1	0
FW	(England) Billy Coole	8	1	0	0	8	1
FW	(England) Roy Cooling	33	7	3	2	36	9
FW	(England) Walter Edwards	20	4	1	0	21	4
FW	(England) William Hill	2	0	0	0	2	0
FW	(England) Freddie Hogg	10	2	0	0	10	2
FW	(England) Ken Kay	1	0	0	0	1	0
FW	(England) Harry Oscroft	40	12	3	1	43	13
FW	(England) Frank Shell	22	1	2	0	24	1
