= 1946–47 Mansfield Town F.C. season =

Mansfield Town
1946–47 season
- Manager: Roy Goodall
- Stadium: Field Mill
- Third Division South: 22nd
- FA Cup: First Round
Home colours

The 1946–47 season was Mansfield Town's ninth season in the Football League and fourth and final season in the Third Division South, they finished in bottom in 22nd position with 28 points and were transferred back to the Third Division North.

== Final league table ==
Pos	Team	Pld	W	D	L	GF	GA	GAv	Pts	Promotion
18	Crystal Palace	42	13	11	18	49	62	0.790	37	
19	Leyton Orient	42	12	8	22	54	75	0.720	32	
20	Aldershot	42	10	12	20	48	78	0.615	32	
21	Norwich City	42	10	8	24	64	100	0.640	28	Re-elected
22	Mansfield Town	42	9	10	23	48	96	0.500	28	Re-elected, then transferred to the Third Division North

== Results ==
=== Football League Third Division South ===
Match	Date	Opponent	Venue	Result	Attendance	Scorers
1	31 August 1946	Crystal Palace	H	3–1	9,508	Copestake, Hogg, Bryant
2	4 September 1946	Watford	A	2–1	4,219	Copestake, Bryant
3	7 September 1946	Torquay United	A	2–2	7,258	Bryant (2)
4	9 September 1946	Walsall	A	0–0	9,047	
5	14 September 1946	Port Vale	H	0–3	11,207	
6	18 September 1946	Walsall	H	1–1	7,368	Harper
7	21 September 1946	Bristol Rovers	H	3–1	9,183	Bryant (2), Calverley
8	28 September 1946	Southend United	A	1–1	10,994	Harkin
9	5 October 1946	Queens Park Rangers	H	0–3	13,459	
10	9 October 1946	Watford	H	2–0	5,218	Bryant (2)
11	12 October 1946	Leyton Orient	A	1–3	9,783	Bramley
12	19 October 1946	Bristol City	A	2–5	17,357	Bryant (2)
13	26 October 1946	Swindon Town	H	1–1	7,583	Hogg
14	2 November 1946	Bournemouth & Boscombe Athletic	A	1–3	12,562	Hogg
15	9 November 1946	Cardiff City	H	1–3	9,827	Hogg
16	16 November 1946	Norwich City	A	1–3	16,561	Bryant
17	23 November 1946	Notts County	H	1–0	10,899	Copestake
18	7 December 1946	Aldershot	H	1–3	4,429	Copestake
19	14 December 1946	Brighton & Hove Albion	A	0–5	7,666	
20	21 December 1946	Exeter City	H	1–0	4,485	Hogg
21	25 December 1946	Reading	A	2–2	4,975	Hogg, Copestake
22	26 December 1946	Reading	H	0–3	16,488	
23	28 December 1946	Crystal Palace	A	1–1	15,347	Harkin
24	4 January 1947	Torquay United	H	1–0	5,499	Bryant
25	18 January 1947	Port Vale	A	1–4	14,390	Harkin
26	23 January 1947	Northampton Town	A	0–3	2,713	
27	25 January 1947	Bristol Rovers	A	0–1	9,401	
28	1 February 1947	Southend United	H	0–1	4,411	
29	8 February 1947	Queens Park Rangers	A	1–3	7,776	Bryant
30	1 March 1947	Swindon Town	A	1–6	12,257	Bryant
31	15 March 1947	Cardiff City	A	0–5	9,384	
32	22 March 1947	Norwich City	H	4–4	5,141	Copestake, Betts (2), Carter
33	29 March 1947	Notts County	A	1–5	12,157	Betts
34	4 April 1947	Ipswich Town	H	4–3	5,383	Chadbourne, Carter, Oscroft (2)
35	5 April 1947	Northampton Town	H	3–2	5,625	Chadbourne, Carter, Copestake
36	7 April 1947	Ipswich Town	A	1–2	15,102	Oscroft
37	12 April 1947	Aldershot	A	1–1	4,322	Betts
38	19 April 1947	Brighton & Hove Albion	H	0–3	6,938	
39	26 April 1947	Exeter City	A	0–1	5,346	
40	3 May 1947	Bournemouth & Boscombe Athletic	H	1–1	5,042	Betts
41	17 May 1947	Bristol City	H	1–3	7,012	Bryant
42	31 May 1947	Leyton Orient	H	1–3	4,412	Chessell

=== FA Cup ===
Round	Date	Opponent	Venue	Result	Attendance	Scorers
R1	30 November 1946	Northampton Town	A	0–2	15,600	

== Squad statistics ==
- Squad list sourced from 1946–47 Mansfield Town F.C. season at the English National Football Archive (subscription required)

Pos.	Name	League		FA Cup		Total	
Pos.	Name	Apps	Goals	Apps	Goals	Apps	Goals
GK	(England) Vic Cromack	10	0	0	0	10	0
GK	(England) Dennis Wright	32	0	1	0	33	0
DF	(England) Lloyd Barke	32	0	1	0	33	0
DF	(England) Ernest Bramley	28	1	1	0	29	1
DF	(England) Sammy Chessell	35	1	0	0	35	1
DF	(England) Bill Dallman	4	0	0	0	4	0
DF	(England) Walter Fox	19	0	1	0	20	0
MF	(England) Gordon Baird	8	0	0	0	8	0
MF	(Scotland) Laurie Binnie	20	0	1	0	21	0
MF	(England) Harry Everett	3	0	0	0	3	0
MF	(England) Harold Everett	15	0	0	0	15	0
MF	(England) Jim Harkin	7	3	0	0	7	3
MF	(England) Les Smith	28	0	0	0	28	0
MF	(England) Len Thorpe	5	0	0	0	5	0
FW	(England) Eric Betts	19	5	0	0	19	5
FW	(England) Alex Brown	5	0	1	0	6	0
FW	(England) Eric Bryant	28	15	0	0	28	15
FW	(England) Alf Calverley	30	1	1	0	31	1
FW	(England) Syd Carter	12	3	0	0	12	3
FW	(England) William Chadbourne	6	2	0	0	6	2
FW	(England) Oliver Copestake	33	7	1	0	34	7
FW	(England) Don Harper	21	1	1	0	22	1
FW	(England) Harry Hewitt	1	0	0	0	1	0
FW	(England) Freddie Hogg	35	6	1	0	36	6
FW	(England) William Jeffries	2	0	0	0	2	0
FW	(England) Danny Liddle	1	0	0	0	1	0
FW	(England) Reg Nettleship	1	0	0	0	1	0
FW	(England) Harry Oscroft	12	3	0	0	12	3
FW	(Scotland) James Westland	10	0	1	0	11	0
