= 1948–49 Mansfield Town F.C. season =

Mansfield Town
1948–49 season
- Manager: Roy Goodall
- Stadium: Field Mill
- Third Division North: 10th
- FA Cup: Third round
Home colours

The 1948–49 season was Mansfield Town's 11th season in the Football League and seventh season in the Third Division North, they finished in 10th position with 42 points.

== Final league table ==
Pos	Team	Pld	W	D	L	GF	GA	GAv	Pts
8	Stockport County	42	16	11	15	61	56	1.089	43
9	Wrexham	42	17	9	16	56	62	0.903	43
10	Mansfield Town	42	14	14	14	52	48	1.083	42
11	Tranmere Rovers	42	13	15	14	46	57	0.807	41
12	Crewe Alexandra	42	16	9	17	52	74	0.703	41

Source: rsssf.com

== Results ==
=== Football League Third Division North ===
Match	Date	Opponent	Venue	Result	Attendance	Scorers
1	21 August 1948	Doncaster Rovers	H	2–2	16,749	Oscroft (2)
2	25 August 1948	Bradford City	A	0–1	9,481	
3	28 August 1948	Hull City	A	0–4	34,075	
4	30 August 1948	Bradford City	H	1–0	13,056	Oscroft
5	4 September 1948	Rotherham United	H	1–2	16,224	Cooling
6	6 September 1948	Halifax Town	H	2–1	11,626	Cooling, McCarter
7	11 September 1948	Accrington Stanley	A	1–1	6,160	Banks
8	13 September 1948	Halifax Town	A	2–2	8,900	Banks, Oscroft
9	18 September 1948	Oldham Athletic	H	3–2	11,910	Banks, Oscroft (2)
10	25 September 1948	Tranmere Rovers	A	0–1	8,140	
11	2 October 1948	Chester	H	1–0	12,459	McCarter
12	9 October 1948	Southport	A	1–1	8,850	Wheatley
13	16 October 1948	Crewe Alexandra	H	5–1	12,512	Oscroft, Edwards, Devey, Mercer (2)
14	23 October 1948	York City	A	1–2	10,888	Oscroft
15	30 October 1948	Stockport County	H	4–0	11,807	Mercer (3), Banks
16	6 November 1948	Carlisle United	A	1–3	13,726	Cooling
17	13 November 1948	Gateshead	H	1–1	8,983	Mercer
18	20 November 1948	Hartlepools United	A	1–1	7,394	Wheatley
19	4 December 1948	New Brighton	A	0–1	5,900	
20	18 December 1948	Doncaster Rovers	A	1–1	10,541	Oscroft
21	27 December 1948	Wrexham	H	1–2	13,104	Oscroft
22	1 January 1949	Hull City	H	1–1	11,735	Devey
23	15 January 1949	Rotherham United	A	0–1	16,841	
24	22 January 1949	Accrington Stanley	H	2–0	11,703	Oscroft, Cooling
25	29 January 1949	Darlington	H	2–2	14,094	Devey, Banks
26	5 February 1949	Oldham Athletic	A	0–4	14,935	
27	12 February 1949	New Brighton	H	2–0	9,187	Oscroft (2)
28	19 February 1949	Tranmere Rovers	H	0–0	11,448	
29	26 February 1949	Chester	A	1–1	5,250	Banks
30	5 March 1949	Southport	H	1–1	6,237	Cooling
31	12 March 1949	Crewe Alexandra	A	1–3	5,598	Cooling
32	19 March 1949	York City	H	3–0	8,197	Banks (2), Peters
33	26 March 1949	Stockport County	A	0–2	8,138	
34	2 April 1949	Carlisle United	H	2–0	8,615	Oscroft, Wheatley
35	4 April 1949	Rochdale	A	0–1	3,362	
36	9 April 1949	Gateshead	A	0–0	3,958	
37	15 April 1949	Barrow	A	0–1	5,759	
38	16 April 1949	Hartlepools United	H	1–0	9,017	Cooling
39	18 April 1949	Barrow	H	2–0	8,996	McCarter (2)
40	23 April 1949	Darlington	A	2–1	7,490	Barks, Brown (o.g)
41	30 April 1949	Rochdale	H	2–0	9,885	Chessell (2)
42	4 May 1949	Wrexham	A	1–1	4,353	Peters

=== FA Cup ===
Round	Date	Opponent	Venue	Result	Attendance	Scorers
R1	27 November 1948	Gloucester City	H	4–0	11,400	Oscroft, Mercer (3)
R2	11 December 1948	Northampton Town	H	2–1	13,501	Oscroft, Mercer
R3	8 January 1949	Preston North End	A	1–2	35,985	Oscroft

== Squad statistics ==
- Squad list sourced from 1948–49 Mansfield Town F.C. season at the English National Football Archive (subscription required)

Pos.	Name	League		FA Cup		Total	
Pos.	Name	Apps	Goals	Apps	Goals	Apps	Goals
GK	(England) Harry Searson	15	0	0	0	15	0
GK	(England) Dennis Wright	27	0	3	0	30	0
DF	(England) Sammy Chessell	36	2	3	0	39	2
DF	(England) Walter Fox	8	0	0	0	8	0
DF	(Scotland) Johnny Grogan	42	0	3	0	45	0
DF	(Wales) David Jones	41	0	3	0	44	0
MF	(England) Eddie Barks	16	2	0	0	16	2
MF	(England) Charlie Croft	38	0	3	0	41	0
MF	(England) Ray Devey	34	3	3	0	37	3
MF	(England) Sam Hodgson	2	0	0	0	2	0
MF	(England) Jack Lewis	4	0	0	0	4	0
FW	(England) George Banks	36	7	3	0	39	7
FW	(England) Billy Coole	5	0	0	0	5	0
FW	(England) Roy Cooling	29	7	0	0	29	7
FW	(England) Walter Edwards	5	1	0	0	5	1
FW	(England) Wilf Ibbotson	2	0	0	0	2	0
FW	(Scotland) Alex Lennon	3	0	0	0	3	0
FW	(Scotland) Jim McCarter	26	4	3	0	29	4
FW	(England) Stan Mercer	12	6	3	4	15	10
FW	(England) Harry Oscroft	38	14	3	3	41	17
FW	(England) Tom Peters	6	2	0	0	6	2
FW	(England) Billy Wheatley	37	3	3	0	40	3
–	Own goals	–	1	–	0	–	1
