= Wood House =

Wood House may refer to:

- Jack Wood House, Judsonia, Arkansas, listed on the National Register of Historic Places (NRHP) in White County
- W. L. Wood House, Morrilton, Arkansas, NRHP-listed in Conway County
- Walter B. Wood House, Modesto, California, NRHP-listed in Stanislaus County
- Wood–Morris–Bonfils House, Denver, Colorado, NRHP-listed in Denver County
- Wood–Tellkamp House, LaMoille, Illinois, NRHP-listed
- Ernest M. Wood Office and Studio, Quincy, Illinois, NRHP-listed
- John Wood Mansion, Quincy, Illinois, NRHP-listed
- John Wood Farmstead, Milroy, Indiana, NRHP-listed in Rush County
- William Kennison Wood House, Iowa Center, Iowa, NRHP-listed in Story County
- Herman Wood Round Barn, Iowa Falls, Iowa, NRHP-listed in Franklin County
- Jeremiah Wood House, Sabula, Iowa, NRHP-listed in Jackson County
- Wood House (Cottonwood Falls, Kansas), NRHP-listed in Chase County
- William Johnson Wood House, Hiseville, Kentucky, NRHP-listed in Barren County
- Gen. George T. Wood House, Munfordville, Kentucky, NRHP-listed in Hart County
- J. A. Wood House, Cambridge, Massachusetts, NRHP-listed
- Charles Wood House, Stoneham, Massachusetts, NRHP-listed
- Nathan Wood House, Westminster, Massachusetts, NRHP-listed
- Ahijah Wood House, Westminster, Massachusetts, NRHP-listed
- Ezra Wood–Levi Warner Place, Westminster, Massachusetts, NRHP-listed
- Wood Home for Boys, Mathiston, Mississippi, NRHP-listed in Webster County
- Wood House (Dublin, New Hampshire), NRHP-listed in Cheshire County
- Dr. Granville Wood House, Mimbres, New Mexico, NRHP-listed in Grant County
- Harry Wood House, Huntington, New York, NRHP-listed in Suffolk County
- William Wooden Wood House, Huntington, New York, NRHP-listed in Suffolk County
- John Wood House (Huntington Station, New York), NRHP-listed in Suffolk County
- Wilford Wood House, Mountainville, New York, NRHP-listed in Orange County
- Amos Wood House, North Landing, New York, NRHP-listed in Jefferson County
- Jethro Wood House, Poplar Ridge, New York, a National Historic Landmark and NRHP-listed in Cayuga County
- Joseph Wood House, Sayville, New York, NRHP-listed in Suffolk County
- Dempsey Wood House, Kinston, North Carolina, NRHP-listed in Lenoir County
- Wood Old Homestead, Rio Grande, Ohio, NRHP-listed in Gallia County
- Arad Wood House, Cranston, Rhode Island, NRHP-listed in Providence County
- Andy Wood Log House and Willie Wood Blacksmith Shop, Georgetown, Tennessee, NRHP-listed in Meigs County
- John Howland Wood House, Bayside, Texas, NRHP-listed in Refugio County
- Wood–Hughes House, Brenham, Texas, NRHP-listed in Washington County
- George H. Wood House, Cedar City, Utah, NRHP-listed in Iron County
- Wood–Harrison House, Springville, Utah, NRHP-listed in Utah County
- Wood Hall (Callaghan, Virginia), Callaghan, Virginia, NRHP-listed in Alleghany County
- Judge Henry Wood Jr. House, Clarksville, NRHP-listed in Mecklenburg County
- J. W. Wood Building, Lynchburg, Virginia, NRHP-listed
- Theodore Wood House, Marshfield, Vermont, NRHP-listed in Washington County
- Col. Henry Hewitt Wood House, Charleston, West Virginia, NRHP-listed

== See also ==
- Woods House (disambiguation)
