= Allcock =

Allcock is a surname. Notable people with the surname include:

- Amy Allcock (born 1993), British sprinter
- Annette Allcock (1923–2001), English artist
- Bill Allcock (1907–1971), English footballer
- Charles Allcock (1855–1947), English cricketer
- Daniel Allcock, American mathematician, professor of mathematics at the University of Texas at Austin
- Frank Allcock (1925–2005), English footballer
- Harry R. Allcock (born 1932), American academic chemist
- Henry Allcock (1759–1808), English judge
- Ken Allcock (1921–1996), English footballer
- Louise Allcock, British marine biologist
- Maartin Allcock (1957–2018), English musician
- Terry Allcock (1935–2024), English footballer
- Thomas Allcock (1815–1891), American inventor and businessman
- Tony Allcock (born 1955), English bowls player
