= John Woods House =

John Woods House or John Wood House may refer to:

- John Wood House (Huntington Station, New York), listed on the National Register of Historic Places, a colonial peer to Suydam House
- John Woods House (Pittsburgh, Pennsylvania), listed on the National Register of Historic Places

== See also ==
- Woods House (disambiguation)
