= Harry Hewitt (disambiguation) =

Harry Hewitt (c. 1861–1907) was an Indigenous Australian cricketer and Australian rules footballer. Harry Hewitt may also refer to:

- Harry Hewitt (English footballer) (1919–2011)
- Harry Hewitt (Coronation Street), fictional character on the TV series Coronation Street, between 1960 and 1967

== See also ==
- Harry Lovell-Hewitt (born 1998), English international judoka
- Harry Hewett (born 1867), member of the Wisconsin State Assembly
- Harold Hewitt (disambiguation)
- Henry Hewitt (disambiguation)
