= John Wood House =

John Wood House may refer to:

- John Wood Mansion, Quincy, Illinois, listed on the National Register of Historic Places (NRHP)
- John Wood Farmstead, Milroy, Indiana, listed on the NRHP in Rush County, Indiana
- John Wood House (Huntington Station, New York), NRHP-listed
- John Howland Wood House, Bayside, Texas, listed on the NRHP in Refugio County, Texas
