= George Banks =

George Banks may refer to:

- George Linnaeus Banks (1821–1881), British author
- George L. Banks (soldier) (1839–1924), American soldier and Medal of Honor recipient
- George Banks (rugby league) (c. 1909–?), English rugby league player in the 1930s and 1940s
- George Banks (footballer) (1919–1931), English footballer
- George Banks (baseball) (1938–1985), American baseball player in the 1960s
- George Emil Banks (1942–2025), American mass murderer convicted of the 1982 Wilkes-Barre shootings
- George Banks (basketball) (born 1972), American professional basketball player from 1995 to 2010

== Fictional characters ==
- George Banks (Mary Poppins), one of the main characters in Mary Poppins
- George Stanley Banks, the protagonist/narrator in the films Father of the Bride and Father of the Bride Part II

== See also ==
- George Bankes (1788–1856), MP for Corfe Castle and Dorset
- George Bank (disambiguation)
