= Henry Hewitt =

Henry Hewitt may refer to:

- Henry Hewitt (painter) (1818–1879), English landscape painter
- Henry Charles Hewitt (1885–1968), English film actor
- Henry Harwood Hewitt (1874–1926), American architect who worked in Denver (including with Maurice Biscoe) and Los Angeles
- William Henry Hewitt (1884–1966), South African soldier and Victoria Cross recipient
- Henry Kent Hewitt (1887–1972), American naval officer
- Col. Henry Hewitt Wood House, a historic home located at Charleston, West Virginia
- Hewitt, Minnesota, named for Henry Hewitt, an early settler
- Henry Hewitt, alias Tokamak, a fictional DC Comics character
