= James Harkin =

James Harkin may refer to:

- James Bernard Harkin (1875–1955), Canadian conservationist
- James Harkin (podcaster), British podcaster
- Jim Harkin (1913–1988), English professional footballer
