= Woodsboro =

Woodsboro may refer to a place in the United States:

- Woodsboro, Maryland
- Woodsboro, Texas
- Woodsboro, California, a fictional town where multiple films in the Scream horror movie franchise are set.
