= Woodsboro Independent School District =

School district in Texas, United States

Address
- 408 South Kasten Woodsboro, Texas, 78393; United States

District information
- Grades: PK–12
- Schools: 2
- NCES District ID: 4846380

Students and staff
- Students: 410 (2023–2024)
- Teachers: 37.52 (on an FTE basis)
- Student–teacher ratio: 10.93:1

Other information
- Website: www.wisd.net

Woodsboro Independent School District is a public school district based in Woodsboro, Texas (USA). In addition to Woodsboro, the district also serves the town of Bayside

== Schools ==
Woodsboro ISD has two campuses -

- Woodsboro Junior/Senior High (Grades 7–12)
- Woodsboro Elementary School (Grades PK-6).

In 2009, the school district was rated "academically acceptable" by the Texas Education Agency.
