= National Register of Historic Places listings in Refugio County, Texas =

Location of Refugio County in Texas

This is a list of the National Register of Historic Places listings in Refugio County, Texas.

This is intended to be a complete list of properties listed on the National Register of Historic Places in Refugio County, Texas. There are five properties listed on the National Register in the county. One property is also a Recorded Texas Historic Landmark.

This National Park Service list is complete through NPS recent listings posted March 21, 2025.

== Current listings ==
The locations of National Register properties may be seen in a mapping service provided.

	Name on the Register	Image	Date listed	Location	City or town	Description
1	Amon B. King's Men Monument	Amon B. King's Men Monument	July 27, 2018 (#100002758)	807 Commerce St., King's Memorial Park; 28°17′47″N 97°16′30″W	Refugio	
2	Mitchell-Simmons House	Mitchell-Simmons House	February 1, 2024 (#100009893)	904 Commerce Street; 28°17′45″N 97°16′33″W	Refugio	Also known as "Anaqua". Severely damaged during Hurricane Harvey in 2017.
3	Mission Nuestra Senora del Refugio Monument	Mission Nuestra Senora del Refugio Monument	July 27, 2018 (#100002759)	1008 S Alamo St. 28°17′39″N 97°16′39″W	Refugio	
4	Refugio County Courthouse	Refugio County Courthouse	August 22, 2002 (#02000895)	808 Commerce; 28°17′48″N 97°16′33″W	Refugio	
5	John Howland Wood House	John Howland Wood House	October 13, 1983 (#83003811)	1 Copano Bay St. 28°05′32″N 97°12′45″W	Bayside	Recorded Texas Historic Landmark

== See also ==
- National Register of Historic Places listings in Texas
- Recorded Texas Historic Landmarks in Refugio County
