= George Bank =

George Bank may refer to:

- George Bligh Bank, a seamount in the northeast Atlantic, west of Scotland
- Georges Bank, large elevated area of the sea floor between Cape Cod, Massachusetts (USA), and Cape Sable Island, Nova Scotia

== See also ==
- George Banks (disambiguation)
