= Harold Hewitt =

Harold Hewitt may refer to:

- Harold Hewitt (rowing) (born 1938), Australian former representative rowing coxswain
- Harold Hewitt (trade unionist) (1899–1968), British trade unionist and politician

== See also ==
- Harry Hewitt (disambiguation)
