= Isaac Greenwood House =

Historic house in New Hampshire, United States

- U.S. National Register of Historic Places
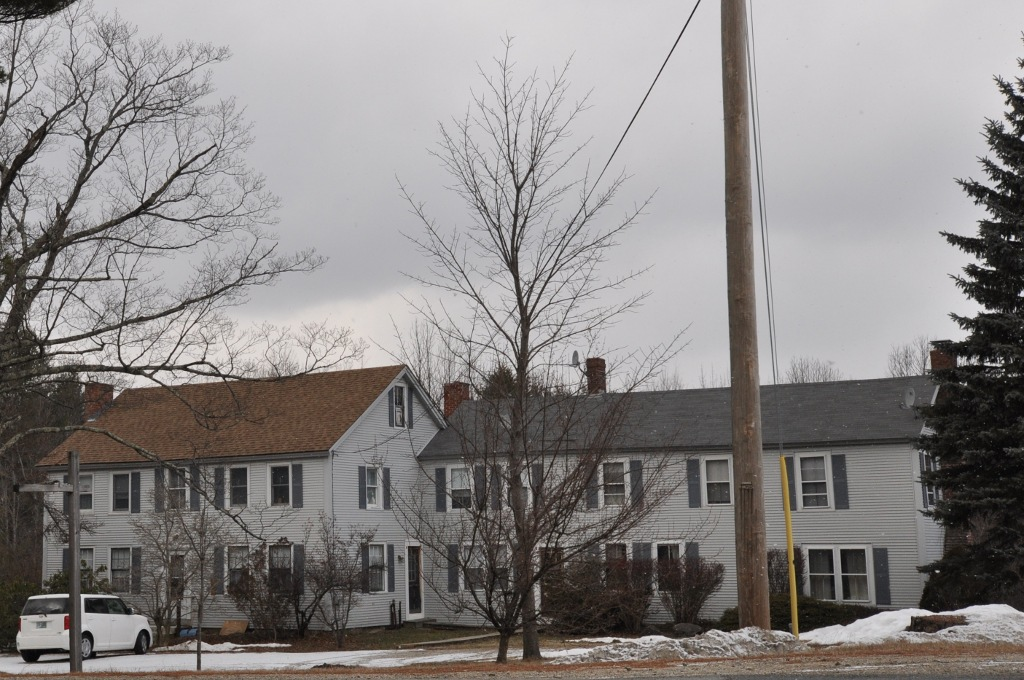

- Location within New Hampshire Location within the United States
- Location: Peterborough Rd., Dublin, New Hampshire
- Coordinates: 42°54′28″N 72°2′43″W
- Area: less than one acre
- Built: 1784
- Built by: Greenwood, Isaac
- Architectural style: Colonial
- MPS: Dublin MRA
- NRHP reference No.: 83004034
- Added to NRHP: December 18, 1983

The Isaac Greenwood House is a historic house on New Hampshire Route 101 in eastern Dublin, New Hampshire, United States. The oldest portion of this house was built c. 1784 by Isaac Greenwood, a veteran of the American Revolutionary War. The house, a good example of additive architecture of the 19th century, was listed on the National Register of Historic Places in 1983.

== Description and history ==
The Isaac Greenwood House is located in eastern Dublin, on the north side of New Hampshire Route 101 just east of its junction with East Harrisville Road. It is a 2 1/2-story wood-frame structure, with a clapboarded exterior and side gable roof. The main facade is five bays wide, with windows arranged symmetrically around the center entrance. A two-story single-depth ell extends to the right, offset back from the main facade. The ell has irregular window placement, with five windows on each level, along with two entrances.

The house was built about 1784 by Isaac Greenwood, a Massachusetts native and veteran of the American Revolutionary War. When built, it was a 1 1/2-story Cape style house with a large central chimney (whose foundation survives in the basement). This structure was raised to a full two stories in the early 19th century, and the ell was added c. 1885. The interior of the oldest portion has retained some of its period finishes, and represents a good example of a local vernacular farmhouse.

== See also ==
- Moses Greenwood House
- National Register of Historic Places listings in Cheshire County, New Hampshire
