= Wood House (Dublin, New Hampshire) =

Historic house in New Hampshire, United States

- U.S. National Register of Historic Places
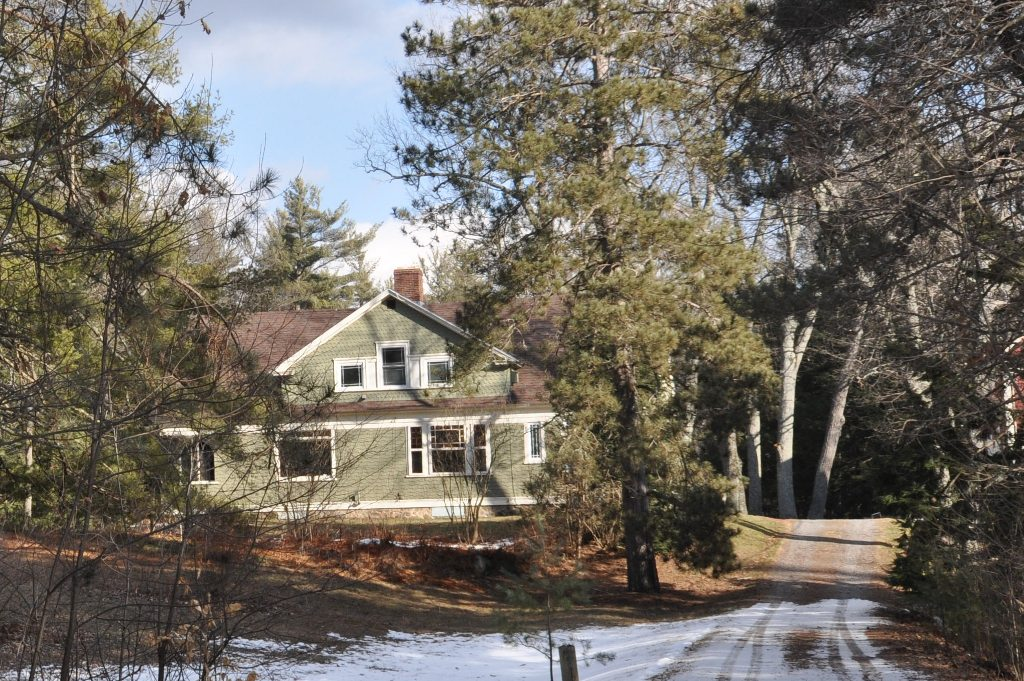

- Location within New Hampshire Location within the United States
- Location: NH 101 and 137, Dublin, New Hampshire
- Coordinates: 42°54′0″N 72°1′25″W
- Area: 0.8 acres (0.32 ha)
- Built: 1890
- Architectural style: Shingle Style
- MPS: Dublin MRA
- NRHP reference No.: 83004088
- Added to NRHP: December 15, 1983

The Wood House is a historic house at the southeast corner of New Hampshire Routes 101 and 137 in Dublin, New Hampshire. Built in 1890, it is a locally distinctive example of Shingle style architecture with Romanesque features. The house was listed on the National Register of Historic Places in 1983.

== Description and history ==
The Wood House is located in eastern Dublin, at the southeast corner of Routes 101 and 137 (Lower Jaffrey Road). It is accessed via a short driveway on Lower Jaffrey Road. It is a two-story wood-frame structure, with a gabled roof and shingled exterior. It is a distinctive Romanesque variant of Shingle style, with round-arch windows on its north and east elevations. The main gable ends are finished scalloped shingles. The second story consists mainly of a large gabled dormer that extends over a recessed porch.

This house was built in 1890 as a summer cottage by Horace Wood, whose wife was descended from Moses Greenwood (whose house survives nearby), one of Dublin's early settlers. It is one of very few Shingle style houses on the east side of town. It has been in the hands of Wood's descendants for many years; among its owners was Harvey Hayes, a professor of physics at Swarthmore College who is credited with the invention of sonar.

== See also ==
- National Register of Historic Places listings in Cheshire County, New Hampshire
