= Woods House =

Woods House may refer to:

- Reid-Woods House, Sarasota, Florida, listed on the National Register of Historic Places
- Mosely-Woods House, Yazoo City, Mississippi, listed on the National Register of Historic Places
- John Woods House (Pittsburgh, Pennsylvania), listed on the National Register of Historic Places

== See also ==
- Wood House (disambiguation)
