= Woodsboro High School (Texas) =

Public school in Texas, United States

Location
- 508 Kasten Street; Woodsboro, Texas 78393-0770; United States; 28.233956°N 97.321312°W

Information
- School type: Public high school
- School district: Woodsboro Independent School District
- Principal: Samuel Castaneda
- Teaching staff: 21.64 (FTE)
- Grades: 6-12
- Enrollment: 230 (2023-2024)
- Student to teacher ratio: 10.63
- Colors: Kelly Green & White
- Athletics conference: UIL Class 2A
- Mascot: Eagle
- Yearbook: The Eagle
- Website: www.wisd.net

Woodsboro High School is a public high school located in Woodsboro, Texas (USA) and classified as a 2A school by the UIL. It is part of the Woodsboro Independent School District located in southwestern Refugio County. In 2015, the school was rated "Met Standard" by the Texas Education Agency.

== Athletics ==
The Woodsboro Eagles compete in these sports -

- Baseball
- Basketball
- Cross Country
- Football
- Golf
- Softball
- Tennis
- Track and Field
- Volleyball

=== State Titles ===
- Boys Track -
  - 1982(2A), 1983(2A), 1992 (2A)
