= John Woods (Pennsylvania politician) =

American politician

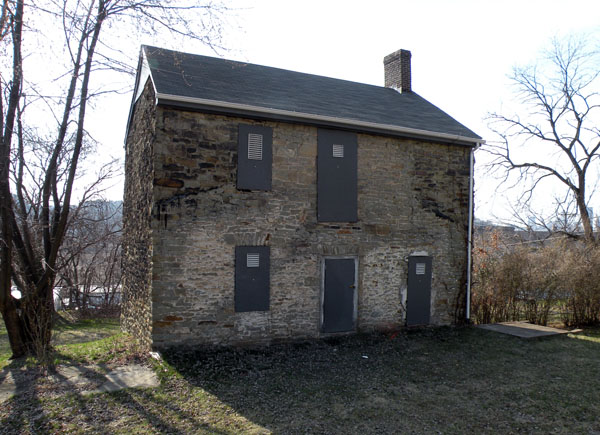
The John Woods House, built in 1792, is perhaps the oldest house in the city of Pittsburgh.

John Woods, (1761, Bedford, Pennsylvania – December 16, 1816, Brunswick County, Virginia) was a Pennsylvania politician who served in the Pennsylvania State Senate and in the United States House of Representatives.

He was the son of Colonel George and Jane McDowell. John was instructed by his father on land surveying. John, his father and his brother George, Jr performed the original survey of Pittsburgh. On 30 Sep 1784, the laying out of the "Town of Pittsburgh" was completed by Thomas Vickroy and John Woods and approved by the attorney (Tench Francis) of the Penns (John & John Penn, Jr.) in Philadelphia. The survey established the future boundaries of Pittsburgh including a tract called "John Woods Plan". John married Theodosius Higbee in about 1780. The two settled in Bedford, briefly, soon after. John's brother Henry Woods was also a U.S. Representative from Pennsylvania.

== History ==
Woods studied law and gained admission to the bar in 1781. He also was a major in the militia and moved to Washington county the same year. In 1784, he joined the Westmoreland and Fayette County bars; He then joined the Allegheny County bar in 1788 and the Bedford bar in 1791. His career was considered successful at the time due to ties to other prominent families in the area. His sister Jane married David Espy and his sister Anne married prominent James Ross, a Pittsburgh attorney. While working David Espy, the collaborative work of the two was described as a powerful influence in Western Pennsylvania at the time. With Hugh Brackentidge and Alexander Addison, Woods controlled the legal system in Pittsburgh from 1788 until the mid-1790s. Woods was the attorney representing Pressley Neville who had lost his home during the Whiskey Rebellion. He was the lottery manager helping to found the Pittsburgh Academy in 1796. His earlier political career included serving as a presidential elector, and he was a five-time candidate for Congress prior to his successful election in 1814: in 1791, 1794, 1796, 1798, and 1812.

He was elected as a Federalist to the Fourteenth Congress, taking office on March 4, 1815. The term was set to run until March 3, 1817, but Woods never appeared in Congress due to poor health. Woods was on his way back from South Carolina to recuperate when he died at the age of 55, only two years into his term.

== See also ==
- List of members of the United States Congress who died in office (1790–1899)

Political offices
| Preceded by position created | Member, Supreme Executive Council of Pennsylvania, representing Fayette County; 6 November 1784 – 2 November 1786 | Succeeded by John Smilie |
U.S. House of Representatives
| Preceded by Adamson Tannehill | Member of the U.S. House of Representatives from Pennsylvania's 14th congressional district 1815–1816 | Succeeded by Henry Baldwin |
