= Refugio County Courthouse =

- U.S. National Register of Historic Places
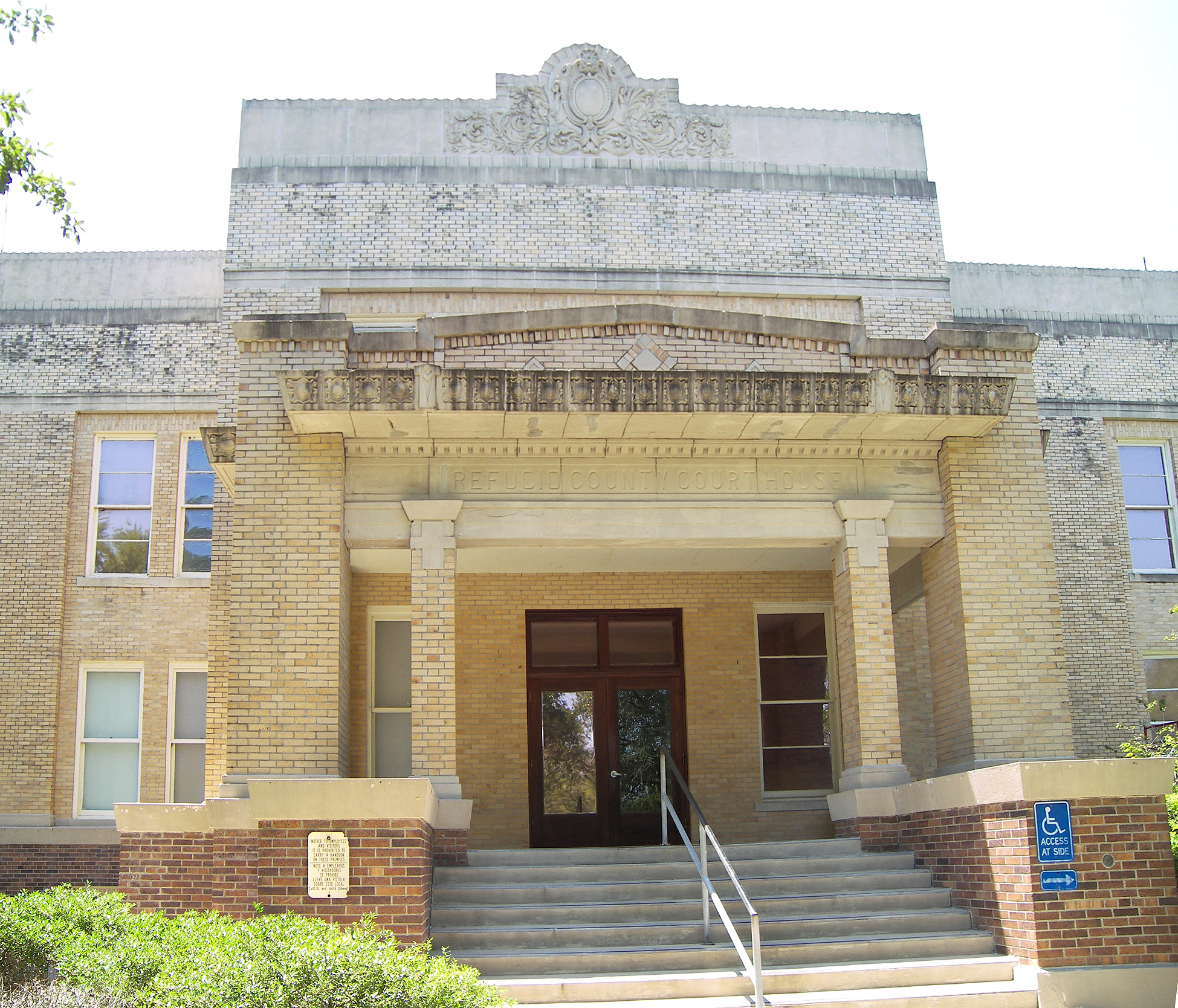
- Refugio County Courthouse in 2008

- Location within Texas Location within the United States
- Location: 808 Commerce St., Refugio, Texas
- Coordinates: 28°17′48″N 97°16′33″W
- Area: less than one acre
- Built: 1917
- Built by: DePuy & Ranney
- Architect: Atlee B. Ayers
- Architectural style: Moderne
- Restored: 1950-1951
- Restored by: Irving H. Dunbar
- NRHP reference No.: 02000895
- Added to NRHP: August 22, 2002

The Refugio County Courthouse, at 808 Commerce in Refugio, Texas, is a courthouse which was listed on the National Register of Historic Places in 2002.

It was built in 1917 in a Mission style design by architect Atlee B. Ayres. It was greatly enlarged and renovated in 1951 into a Moderne style design by Irving H. Dunbar.

The listing included the courthouse, as a contributing building and also two contributing objects. One is a 1936 historical marker provided by the Texas Highway Department as part of Texas's Centennial celebration.

== See also ==
- National Register of Historic Places listings in Refugio County, Texas
- List of county courthouses in Texas
