= 15th Indiana Infantry Regiment =

Infantry regiment of the Union Army during the American Civil War

- Active: May 1861 – June 16, 1864
- Country: United States
- Allegiance: Union
- Branch: Infantry
- Engagements: Battle of Cheat Mountain; Battle of Shiloh; Siege of Corinth; Battle of Perryville; Battle of Stones River; Tullahoma Campaign; Battle of Chickamauga; Siege of Chattanooga; Battle of Missionary Ridge

The 15th Indiana Infantry Regiment was an infantry regiment that served in the Union Army during the American Civil War.

== Service ==
The 15th Indiana Infantry was organized at Lafayette, Indiana for a one-year enlistment in May 1861. It was subsequently reorganized and mustered in for a three-year enlistment on June 14, 1861, under the command of Colonel George Day Wagner.

The regiment was attached to 1st Brigade, Army of Occupation, Western Virginia, July to September 1861. Reynolds' Cheat Mountain District, Western Virginia, to November 1861. 15th Brigade, Army of the Ohio, to December 1861. 15th Brigade, 4th Division, Army of the Ohio, to March 1862. 15th Brigade, 6th Division, Army of the Ohio, March 1862. 21st Brigade, 6th Division, Army of the Ohio, to September 1862. 21st Brigade, 6th Division, IV Corps, Army of the Ohio, to November 1862, 2nd Brigade, 1st Division, Left Wing, XIV Corps, Army of the Cumberland, to January 1863. 2nd Brigade, 1st Division, XXI Corps, Army of the Cumberland, to October 1863. 2nd Brigade, 2nd Division, IV Corps, Army of the Cumberland, to February 1864. Garrison, Chattanooga, Tennessee, Department of the Cumberland, to June 1864.

The 15th Indiana Infantry mustered out of service at Chattanooga, Tennessee on June 16, 1864. Veterans and recruits were transferred to the 17th Indiana Infantry.

== Detailed service ==
Moved to Indianapolis, Indiana then to Clarksburg, Virginia, July 1–6. Western Virginia Campaign July 6–17, including the Battle of Rich Mountain on July 11. Duty in Elkwater Valley, Virginia, July to November 1861. Operations on Cheat Mountain September 11–17. Elkwater September 11. Battle of Cheat Mountain September 12. Battle of Greenbrier River October 3–4. Ordered to Louisville November 19. Duty at Bardstown and Lebanon, Kentucky, until February 1862. Marched to Nashville, Tennessee, February 17-March 13, and to Savannah, Tennessee, March 21-April 6. Battle of Shiloh April 6–7. Advance on and Siege of Corinth, April 29-May 30. Pursuit to Booneville May 30-June 12. Buell's Campaign in northern Alabama and middle Tennessee June to August. March to Louisville, Kentucky, in pursuit of Bragg August 21-September 26. Pursuit of Bragg into Kentucky October 1–22. Battle of Perryville, October 8 (reserve). March to Nashville, Tennessee, October 22-November 7, and duty there until December 26. Lavergne December 11. Advance on Murfreesboro December 26–30. Battle of Stones River December 30–31, 1862 and January 1–3, 1863. Duty at Murfreesboro until June. Reconnaissance to Nolensville and Versailles January 13–15. Tullahoma Campaign June 23-July 7. Camp at Pelham until August 17. Passage of the Cumberland Mountains and Tennessee River and Chickamauga Campaign August 17-September 22. Occupation of Chattanooga September 9, and assigned to duty there as garrison. Siege of Chattanooga, September 24-November 23. Chattanooga-Ringgold Campaign November 23–27. Orchard Knob November 23–24. Battle of Missionary Ridge November 25. Pursuit to Graysville November 26–27. March to relief of Knoxville, November 28-December 8. Duty at Knoxville and vicinity until February 1864. Ordered to Chattanooga, and garrison duty there until June.

== Casualties ==
The regiment lost a total of 183 men during service; 4 officers and 103 enlisted men killed or mortally wounded, 76 enlisted men died of disease.

== Commanders ==
- Colonel George Day Wagner
- Colonel Gustavus A. Wood - commanded at the battles of Perryville and Stones River as lieutenant colonel

== Notable members ==
- Sergeant George L. Banks, Company C - Medal of Honor recipient for action at Missionary Ridge
- Private Charles Gerard Conn, Company B - founder of C.G. Conn Ltd. instrument company
- 2nd Lieutenant Thomas N. Graham, Company G - Medal of Honor recipient for action at Missionary Ridge
- Chaplain John Whitehead - Medal of Honor recipient for action at Stones River

== See also ==
- List of Indiana Civil War regiments
- Indiana in the Civil War
