= Roy Brown (footballer, born 1925) =

English footballer

Personal information
- Full name: Roy Brown
- Date of birth: 10 June 1925
- Place of birth: Stockton-on-Tees, England
- Date of death: December 2004 (aged 79)
- Place of death: Middlesbrough, England
- Position: Full back

Senior career*
| Years | Team | Apps | (Gls) |
| – | Stockton West End | | |
| 1946–1956 | Darlington | 159 | (20) |
- * Club domestic league appearances and goals

Roy Brown (10 June 1925 – December 2004) was an English footballer who scored 20 goals from 159 appearances in the Football League playing as a full back for Darlington in the years following the Second World War. He signed from non-league club Stockton West End.

His playing style was that of a "hard man". According to his teammate Baden Powell, "Roy Brown would hit a player like an Exocet missile".

He worked at engineering firm Head Wrightson in Stockton-on-Tees.
