= Wilf Ibbotson =

English footballer

Personal information
- Full name: Wilfred Ibbotson
- Date of birth: 1 October 1926
- Place of birth: Sheffield, England
- Date of death: 2014 (aged 87–88)
- Position: Inside forward

Senior career*
Years	Team	Apps	(Gls)
1947–1948	Sheffield Wednesday	1	(0)
1948–1949	Mansfield Town	2	(0)
1949	Goole Town		
Total		3	(0)
- * Club domestic league appearances and goals

Wilfred Ibbotson (1 October 1926 – 2014) was an English professional footballer who played in the Football League for Mansfield Town and Sheffield Wednesday.
