= Reg Nettleship =

English footballer

Personal information
- Full name: Reginald Nettleship
- Date of birth: 23 February 1925
- Place of birth: Warsop, England
- Date of death: 2001 (aged 75–76)
- Position: Inside forward

Senior career*
Years	Team	Apps	(Gls)
1942–1945	Welbeck Colliery		
1945–1946	Sheffield United	0	(0)
1946–1947	Mansfield Town	1	(0)
Total		1	(0)
- * Club domestic league appearances and goals

Reginald Nettleship (23 February 1925 – 2001) was an English professional footballer who played in the Football League for Mansfield Town.
