= Alex Brown (footballer, born 1914) =

English footballer

Personal information
- Full name: Alexander Roy Brown
- Date of birth: 21 November 1914
- Place of birth: Seghill, Northumberland, England
- Date of death: 8 August 2006 (aged 91)
- Place of death: Chesterfield, Derbyshire, England
- Height: 5 ft 10 1/2 in (1.79 m)
- Positions: Outside forward; inside right

Senior career*
Years	Team	Apps	(Gls)
–	West Cramlington Welfare		
–	Blyth Spartans		
–	Ashington		
1932–1933	Hartlepools United	0	(0)
–	Seghill Colliery Welfare		
1934–1935	Chesterfield	8	(1)
1935–1936	Darlington	5	(0)
1927–1928	Shrewsbury Town		
1939–19??	Gateshead	0	(0)
1946–1947	Mansfield Town	5	(0)
- * Club domestic league appearances and goals

Alexander Roy Brown (21 November 1914 – 8 August 2006) was an English footballer who made 18 appearances in the Football League playing at outside forward or inside right for Chesterfield, Darlington and Mansfield Town. He was on the books of Hartlepools United without representing them in the League, and played once for Gateshead in the abandoned 1939–40 Football League season. He also played non-league football for clubs including Blyth Spartans, Ashington and Shrewsbury Town.
