= Harold Everett (footballer) =

English footballer

Personal information
- Full name: Harold Everett
- Date of birth: 9 June 1922
- Place of birth: Worksop, England
- Date of death: 2000 (aged 77–78)
- Position: Wing half

Senior career*
Years	Team	Apps	(Gls)
1942–1945	Rufford Colliery		
1945–1946	Notts County	0	(0)
1946–1947	Mansfield Town	15	(0)
Total		15	(0)
- * Club domestic league appearances and goals

Harold Everett (9 June 1922 – 2000) was an English professional footballer who played in the Football League for Mansfield Town.
