= Tom Peters (footballer) =

English footballer

Personal information
- Full name: Thomas James Peters
- Date of birth: 12 December 1920
- Place of birth: Droylsden, England
- Date of death: 2010 (aged 89–90)
- Position: Inside forward

Senior career*
Years	Team	Apps	(Gls)
1937–1938	Avro		
1938–1939	Audenshaw United		
1944	Doncaster Rovers		
1945–1946	Southend United	0	(0)
1946–1947	Doncaster Rovers	0	(0)
1947–1948	Bury	10	(1)
1948	Leeds United	0	(0)
1948	Droylsden		
1948–1949	Mansfield Town	6	(2)
1949	Droylsden		
1949–1950	Accrington Stanley	4	(2)
1950	Brighton & Hove Albion	0	(0)
Total		20	(5)
- * Club domestic league appearances and goals

Thomas James Peters (12 December 1920 – 2010) was an English professional footballer who played in the Football League for Accrington Stanley, Bury and Mansfield Town.
