= George L. Banks (soldier) =

U.S. Medal of Honor recipient

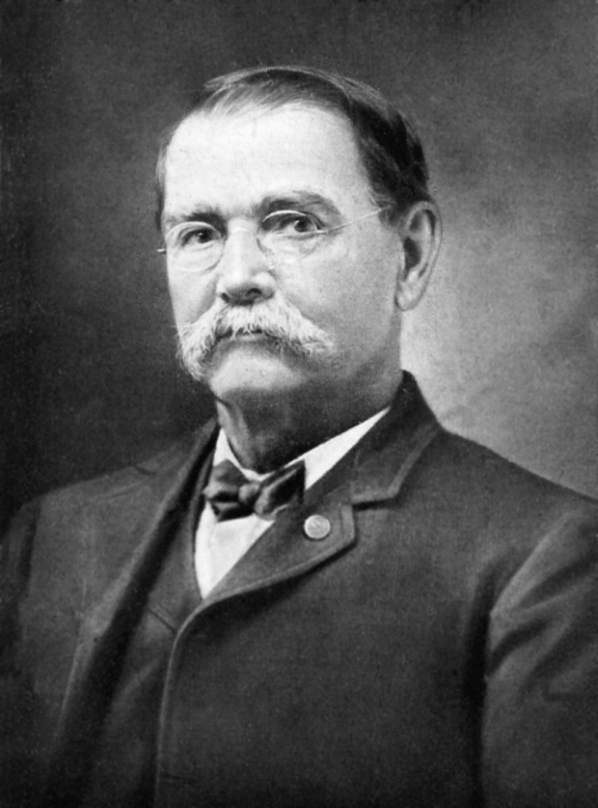
- Born: October 13, 1839; Lake County, Ohio, U.S.
- Died: August 20, 1924 (aged 84); Independence, Kansas, U.S.
- Military career
- Allegiance: United States of America
- Branch: United States Army; Union Army
- Service years: 1861 - 1864
- Rank: First Sergeant
- Unit: 15th Regiment Indiana Volunteer Infantry
- Conflicts: Battle of Missionary Ridge
- Awards: Medal of Honor

George Lovell Banks (October 13, 1839 - August 20, 1924) was an American soldier who received the Medal of Honor for valor during the American Civil War.

== Biography ==
Banks joined the 15th Indiana Infantry Regiment in June 1861, and mustered out three years later. He received the Medal of Honor on February 18, 1891, for his actions at the Battle of Missionary Ridge.

He died at his home in Independence, Kansas, on August 20, 1924.

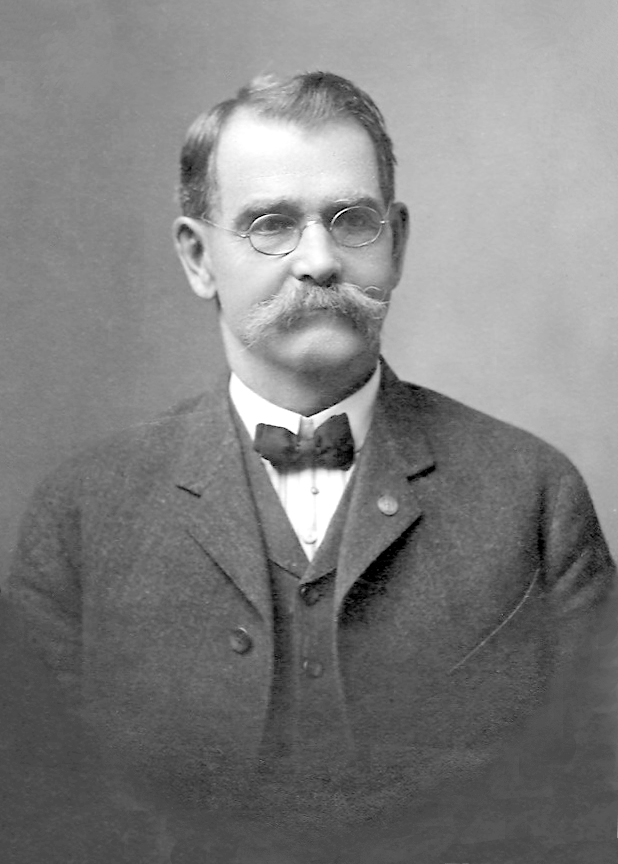

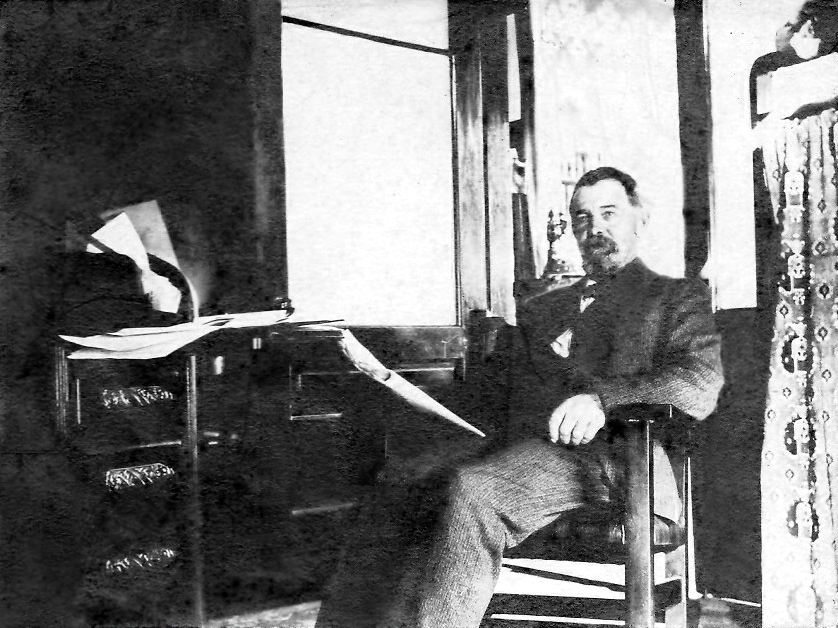

== Medal of Honor citation ==
Citation:

As color bearer, led his regiment in the assault, and, though wounded, carried the flag forward to the enemy's works, where he was again wounded. In a brigade of 8 regiments this flag was the first planted on the parapet.

== See also ==
- List of American Civil War Medal of Honor recipients: A-F
