= Charles Allcock =

English cricketer (1855–1947)

Personal information
- Full name: Charles Howard Allcock
- Born: 16 April 1855; Harborne, Staffordshire, England
- Died: 30 September 1947 (aged 92); Aberdovey, Merioneth, Wales
- Batting: Right-handed
- Bowling: Slow roundarm
- Role: Bowler

Domestic team information
- Years: Team
- 1878–1884: Cambridge University
- 1883: MCC
- 1883: The Rest
- 1895–1898: Buckinghamshire

Career statistics
Competition	First-class
Matches	5
Runs scored	29
Batting average	3.62
100s/50s	0/0
Top score	14
Balls bowled	693
Wickets	14
Bowling average	17.85
5 wickets in innings	0
10 wickets in match	0
Best bowling	4/51
Catches/stumpings	4/–
- Source: CricketArchive, 30 December 2023

Charles Howard Allcock (16 April 1855 – 30 September 1947) was an English cricketer and schoolmaster from Harborne in Staffordshire. He was educated at King Edward's School in Birmingham. He played cricket there and was captain of the school team in 1874. He then enrolled at Emmanuel College, Cambridge where he joined Cambridge University Cricket Club.

He played in one first-class match for Cambridge, against an England XI at Fenner's in 1878. Between 1882 and 1884, Allcock played in four more first-class matches including two against touring Australian teams. Both of these were for the Cambridge University Past and Present team, the first in August 1882 at the United Services Ground, Portsmouth, the second in August 1884 at the County Cricket Ground, Hove. He also played in two matches at the 1883 Scarborough Festival, one for Marylebone Cricket Club against Yorkshire County Cricket Club and the other for a team called The Rest (of England) against a combined Nottinghamshire and Lancashire team.

Following graduation, Allcock became a schoolmaster and taught at Eton College from 1884 to 1910. While he was at Eton, he joined Buckinghamshire County Cricket Club and played in 24 matches for them in the Minor Counties Championship between 1895 and 1898. He died in 1947, aged 92.
