= Oliver Copestake =

English footballer

Personal information
- Full name: Oliver Francis Reginald Copestake
- Date of birth: 1 September 1921
- Place of birth: Mansfield, England
- Date of death: 1953 (aged 31–32)
- Position: Inside forward

Senior career*
Years	Team	Apps	(Gls)
1945	Church Warsop		
1946–1947	Mansfield Town	33	(7)
1947	Boston United		
1948	Heanor Town		
Total		33	(7)
- * Club domestic league appearances and goals

Oliver Francis Reginald Copestake (1 September 1921 – 1953) was an English professional footballer who played in the Football League for Mansfield Town.
