= Len Thorpe =

English footballer

Personal information
- Full name: Leonard Thorpe
- Date of birth: 7 June 1924
- Place of birth: Warsop, England
- Date of death: 2012 (aged 87–88)
- Position: Wing half

Senior career*
| Years | Team | Apps | (Gls) |
| 1944–1945 | Nottingham Forest | 0 | (0) |
| 1945–1947 | Mansfield Town | 5 | (0) |
| 1948 | Grantham | | |
| Total | | 5 | (0) |
- * Club domestic league appearances and goals

Leonard Thorpe (7 June 1924 – 2012) was an English professional footballer who played in the Football League for Mansfield Town.
