= William Jeffries =

English footballer

Personal information
- Full name: William Arthur Jeffries
- Date of birth: 11 March 1921
- Place of birth: Acton, England
- Date of death: 1981 (aged 59–60)
- Position: Inside forward

Senior career*
Years	Team	Apps	(Gls)
1946–1947	Mansfield Town	2	(0)
1947–1948	Hull City	0	(0)
1948	Colchester United		
Total		2	(0)
- * Club domestic league appearances and goals

William Arthur Jeffries (11 March 1921 – 1981) was an English professional footballer who played in the Football League for Mansfield Town.
