= Len Butt (footballer, born 1910) =

English footballer and manager

Personal information
- Full name: Leonard George Butt
- Date of birth: 26 August 1910
- Place of birth: Wilmslow, England
- Date of death: 16 June 1994 (aged 83)
- Position: Inside forward

Senior career*
Years	Team	Apps	(Gls)
1929–1931	Stockport County	8	(0)
1931–1935	Macclesfield Town	150	(84)
1935–1937	Huddersfield Town	67	(11)
1937–1947	Blackburn Rovers	110	(44)
1947–1948	York City	25	(2)
1948	Mansfield Town	15	(4)

Managerial career
- 1948–1950: Mossley (player-manager)
- Macclesfield Town (Reserve Team)
- * Club domestic league appearances and goals

Leonard George Butt (26 August 1910 in Wilmslow – June 1994) was a professional footballer, who played for Stockport County, Macclesfield Town, Huddersfield Town, Blackburn Rovers, York City and Mansfield Town.

He was later manager at Mossley and Macclesfield Town.
