= Jack Wood House =

Historic house in Arkansas, United States

- U.S. National Register of Historic Places
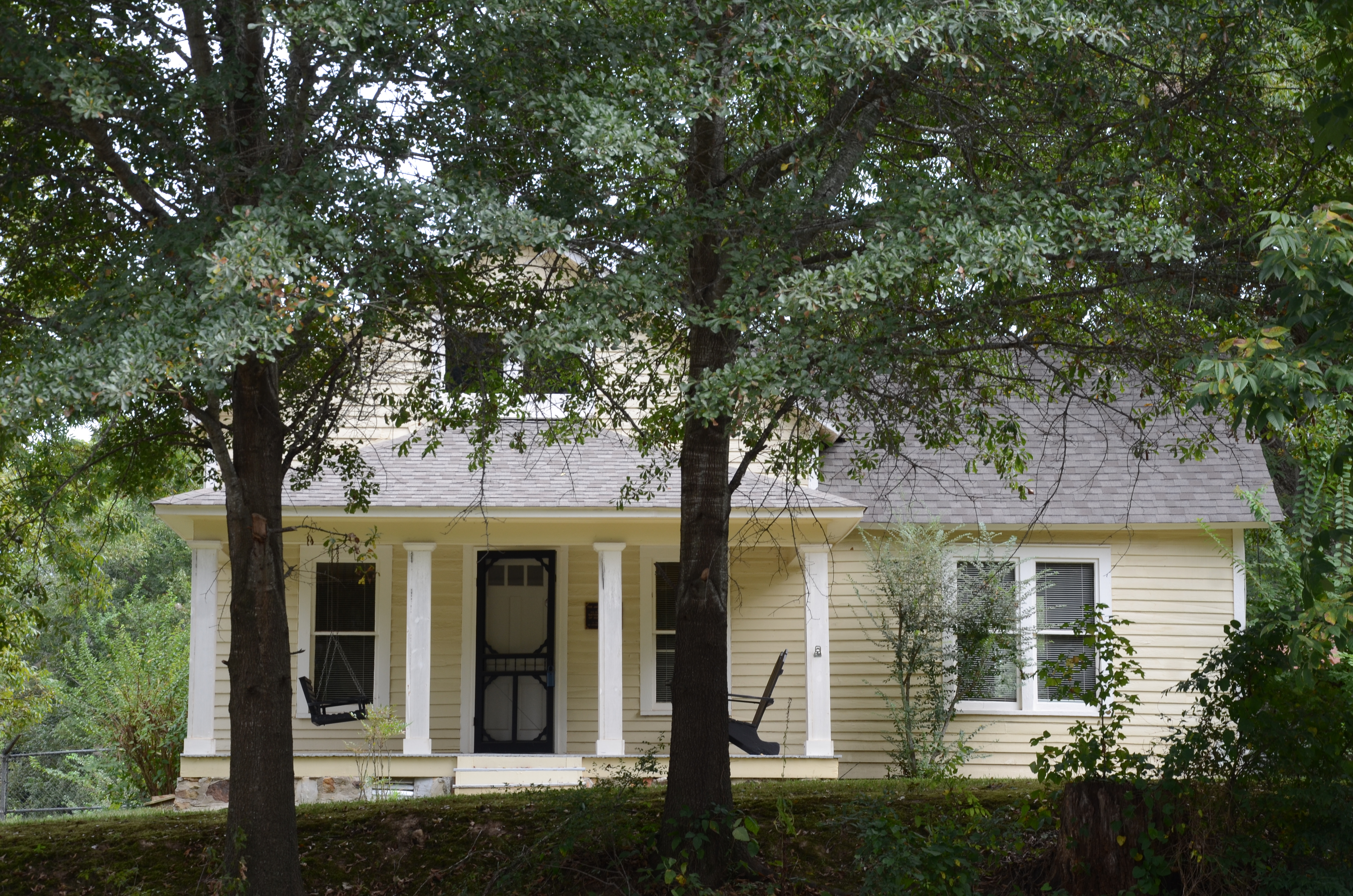

- Location within Arkansas Location within the United States
- Location: Judson Ave., Judsonia, Arkansas
- Coordinates: 35°16′49″N 91°38′14″W
- Area: less than one acre
- Built: 1890
- Architectural style: Box construction
- NRHP reference No.: 89001939
- Added to NRHP: November 2, 1989

The Jack Wood House is a historic house on Judson Avenue in Judsonia, Arkansas. It is an L-shaped wooden structure, clad in weatherboard siding, and presently exhibiting Craftsman styling, the result of a major restyling in c. 1924. The oldest portion of the house was built about 1890, and is a rare local example of box frame construction, with vertical planking as the main means of support, joined to the sills and rafters by square-cut nails. A more conventionally framed ell and the front porch were added about 1907.

The house was listed on the National Register of Historic Places in 1989.

== See also ==
- National Register of Historic Places listings in White County, Arkansas
