= John Howland Wood House =

Historic house in Texas, United States

- U.S. National Register of Historic Places
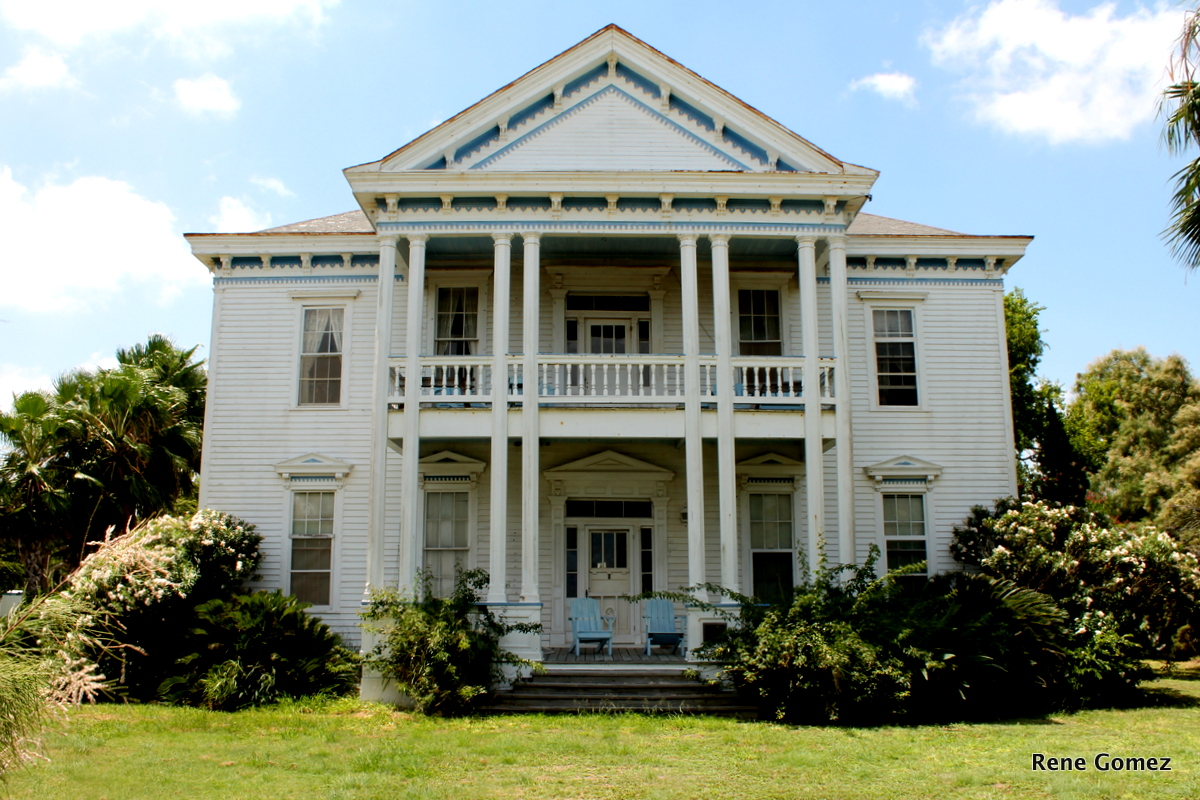
- The house in 2015

- Location within Texas Location within the United States
- Location: 1 Copano Bay Street, Bayside, Texas
- Coordinates: 28°05′32″N 97°12′45″W
- Area: 2 acres (0.81 ha)
- Built: 1875
- Built by: Viggo Kohler
- Architectural style: Greek Revival, Italianate
- NRHP reference No.: 83003811
- Added to NRHP: 2001

The John Howland Wood House is a historic mansion in Bayside, Texas. It was built in 1875, and it was a hotel for five decades. It is listed on the National Register of Historic Places. It is located at 533 Copano Bay Dr in Bayside TX

== History ==
The mansion was built in 1875 by Viggo Kohler for John Howland Wood, his wife Nancy Clark, and their twelve children. Wood was a veteran of the Texas Revolution of 1835-1836 who fought in the Battle of San Jacinto. He also served in the Confederate States Army during the American Civil War of 1861–1865. He subsequently owned ranches in Texas, and he died in 1904.

The house was a hotel from 1907 to the 1950s, and it was acquired by the Seltzer family in the 1970s. It has been the meeting place of the Bayside Historical Society since 2006.

== Architectural significance ==
The mansion was designed in the Greek Revival architectural style, with an Italianate interior. It has been listed on the National Register of Historic Places since 2001.
