= Henry Hewitt (painter) =

English painter (1818–1879)

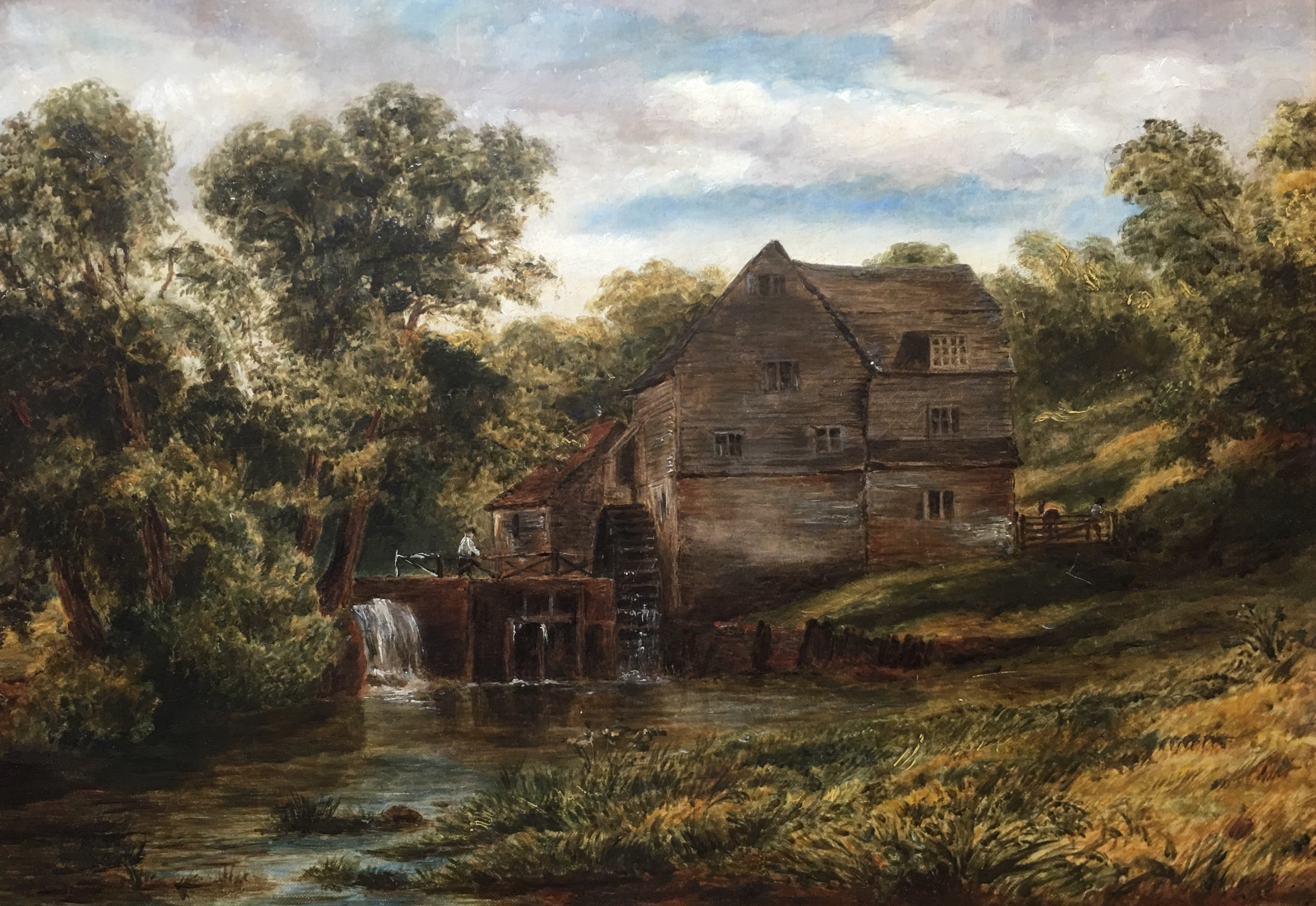
- "The Mill at Dorking," by Henry Hewitt (1818-1879). Oil on canvas, 54.5cm x 35cm, 1869. Signed "H Hewitt" on stretcher.
- Born: 1818; Bristol, England
- Died: 27 November 1879 (aged 60–61); Bristol, England
- Known for: Painting

Henry Hewitt (1818 - 1879) was an English painter of landscapes, who worked mainly in oils and watercolours. Based in Bristol, his style has been called "lyrical and romantic". He exhibited at the Royal Society of British Artists, and his work is on display at Bristol City Museum and Art Gallery.

Within the last 10 years his oil paintings have sold at auction for an average of £1000-£2000, with his watercolours averaging £100-£200.

Some of his works are part of the collection at the Bristol City Museum and Art Gallery. Examples of his paintings include:

- The Mill at Dorking (1869), oil on canvas
- Grounds of Oldbury Court (1856), oil on canvas
- Mill Cottage by Ravine (1847), oil on canvas
- Brockley Combe from Backwell Hill, near Bristol, watercolor
- A valley landscape with a church tower (1856), oil on canvas
- Near Henbury (sold in 2025)
