= Woodsboro, Texas =

- Town
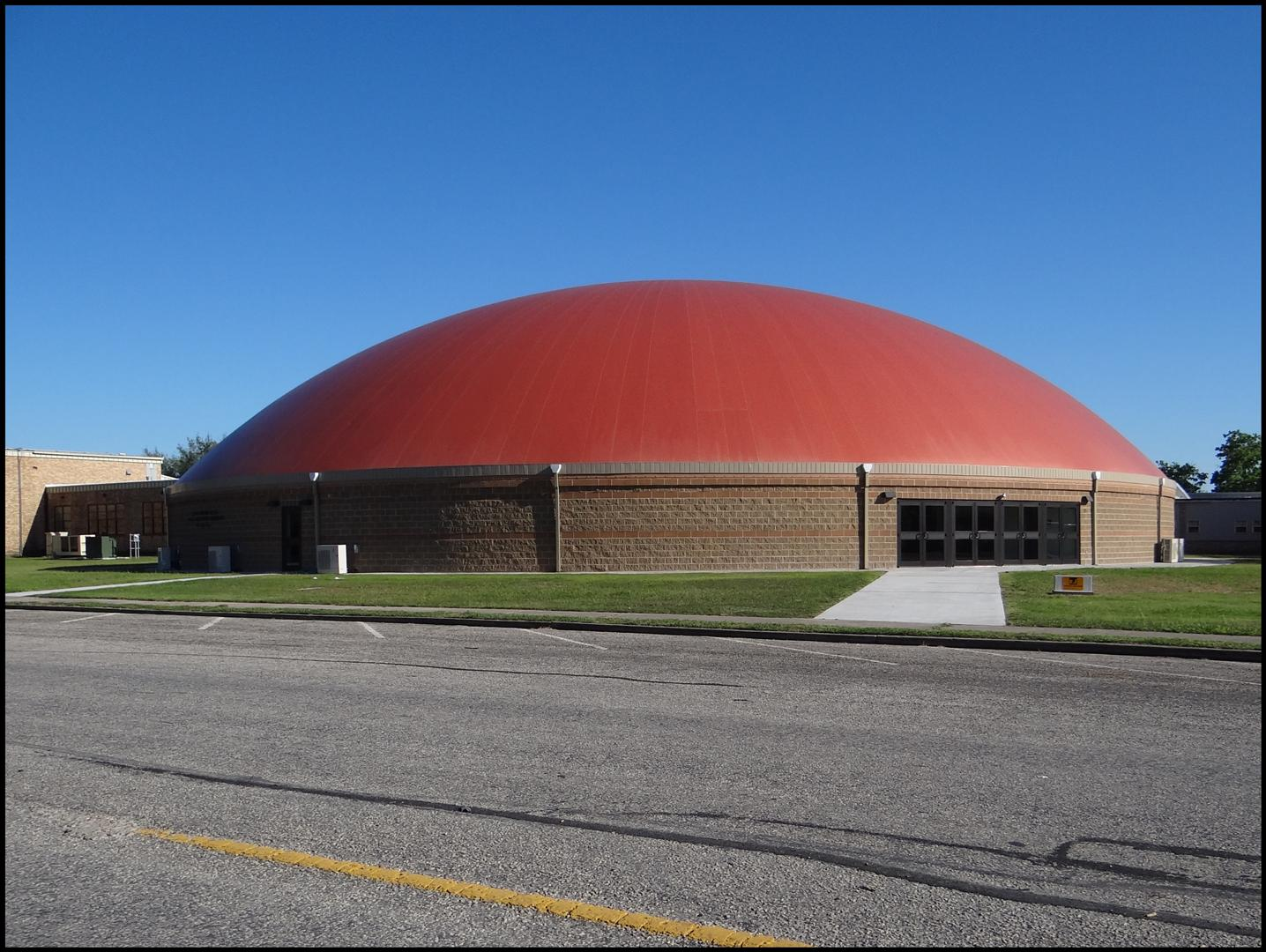
- A hurricane shelter/high school gym in Woodsboro, Texas

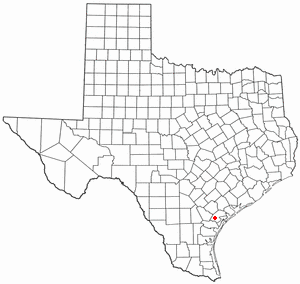
- Location of Woodsboro, Texas

- Coordinates: 28°14′16″N 97°19′30″W
- Country: United States
- State: Texas
- County: Refugio

Area
  - Total: 0.76 sq mi (1.96 km^{2})
  - Land: 0.76 sq mi (1.96 km^{2})
  - Water: 0 sq mi (0.00 km^{2})
- Elevation: 43 ft (13 m)

Population (2020)
  - Total: 1,319
  - Density: 1,740/sq mi (673/km^{2})
- Time zone: UTC-6 (Central (CST))
  - Summer (DST): UTC-5 (CDT)
- ZIP code: 78393
- Area code: 361
- FIPS code: 48-80176
- GNIS feature ID: 1350565
- Website: www.woodsborotx.net

Woodsboro is a town in Refugio County, Texas, United States. The population was 1,319 at the 2020 census.

== Geography ==
Woodsboro is located at 28°14′16″N 97°19′30″W (28.237826, –97.325068).

According to the United States Census Bureau, the town has a total area of 0.8 square miles (2.1 km^{2}), all land.

=== Climate ===
The climate in this area is characterized by hot, humid summers and generally mild to cool winters. According to the Köppen Climate Classification system, Woodsboro has a humid subtropical climate, abbreviated "Cfa" on climate maps.

== Demographics ==
Historical population
Census	Pop.	Note	%±
1930	1,286		—
1940	1,426		10.9%
1950	1,836		28.8%
1960	2,081		13.3%
1970	1,839		−11.6%
1980	1,974		7.3%
1990	1,731		−12.3%
2000	1,685		−2.7%
2010	1,512		−10.3%
2020	1,319		−12.8%
U.S. Decennial Census

=== 2020 census ===
Woodsboro racial composition (NH = Non-Hispanic) (Note: Note: the US Census treats Hispanic/Latino as an ethnic category. This table excludes Latinos from the racial categories and assigns them to a separate category. Hispanics/Latinos can be of any race.)
Race	Number	Percentage
White (NH)	545	41.32%
Black or African American (NH)	54	4.09%
Native American or Alaska Native (NH)	1	0.08%
Asian (NH)	10	0.76%
Some Other Race (NH)	1	0.08%
Mixed/Multi-Racial (NH)	16	1.21%
Hispanic or Latino	692	52.46%
Total	1,319	

As of the 2020 United States census, there were 1,319 people, 489 households, and 311 families residing in the town.

=== 2000 census ===
As of the census of 2000, there were 1,685 people, 613 households, and 446 families residing in the town. The population density was 2,218.6 inhabitants per square mile (856.6/km^{2}). There were 705 housing units at an average density of 928.3 per square mile (358.4/km^{2}). The racial makeup of the town was 77.51% White, 3.62% African American, 0.47% Native American, 0.12% Asian, 0.06% Pacific Islander, 15.07% from other races, and 3.15% from two or more races. Hispanic or Latino of any race were 53.89% of the population.

There were 613 households, out of which 34.1% had children under the age of 18 living with them, 56.0% were married couples living together, 13.1% had a female householder with no husband present, and 27.1% were non-families. 23.5% of all households were made up of individuals, and 11.1% had someone living alone who was 65 years of age or older. The average household size was 2.74 and the average family size was 3.28.

In the town, the population was spread out, with 28.1% under the age of 18, 8.2% from 18 to 24, 26.9% from 25 to 44, 22.7% from 45 to 64, and 14.1% who were 65 years of age or older. The median age was 36 years. For every 100 females, there were 92.6 males. For every 100 females age 18 and over, there were 86.7 males.

The median income for a household in the town was $27,875, and the median income for a family was $33,456. Males had a median income of $26,292 versus $16,875 for females. The per capita income for the town was $14,133. About 14.7% of families and 17.1% of the population were below the poverty line, including 20.3% of those under age 18 and 18.1% of those age 65 or over.

== Education ==
The City of Woodsboro is served by the Woodsboro Independent School District and home to the Woodsboro High School Eagles.

== History ==
Woodsboro is located in southwestern Refugio County, five miles southwest of the city of Refugio at the intersection of U.S. Highway 77 (Future Interstate 69E) and Farm to Market Road 2441. The town began as part of a land development project organized in 1906 by W. C. Johnson and George P. Pugh, experienced developers from Danville, Illinois. The town was originally called Church because it was located just north of the Church siding on the St. Louis, Brownsville and Mexico Railway, which built through the area in 1906. The town site was laid out in November and December 1906, and by February 1907 Johnson and Pugh had completed the town's first structure, a wooden hotel built to house prospective land buyers. ("This is the Real Garden of the Lord," a large sign painted on the side of the hotel advised visitors.) A post office was established in the hotel later that year, and the town's name was changed to Woodsboro after Captain Tobias D. Wood, who had sold the Bonnie View Ranch to the developers. The surrounding farmlands were praised in advertisements distributed across Texas and midwestern states, and a number of settlers began to move into the area. By 1908, when Woodsboro was officially platted, a school had been established, and the town already had grown to include about twenty-five buildings, including the hotel, a cotton gin, a lumberyard, and a number of dwellings. Other stores and a Masonic temple were quickly added, and in 1910 the town's first newspaper, the Woodsboro Hustler, began publication. The Bank of Refugio opened a branch in Woodsboro in 1912, and in 1913 a contract was awarded to install electrical power and lights in the community. By 1914 there were about 500 people living in Woodsboro. The Commercial Club, a group of local businessmen organized soon after the town's creation, actively worked to improve the community. The club organized the town's first water works, which were turned over to the local government when Woodsboro incorporated in 1928.

An estimated 450 people lived in Woodsboro in 1925, but the town experienced a small boom after 1928, when oil was discovered nearby. As construction and oilfield workers moved into the area, Woodsboro's population rapidly increased, rising to 1,286 by 1930. Though the town was touched by the Great Depression in the early 1930s, by the late 1930s oil activity had revived in the area, and the town continued to grow. By 1941 Woodsboro had thirty-five businesses and a population of 1,426. Though the number of farms in the area surrounding the city declined after World War II, the oil and gas industry helped to sustain the local economy until the county's petroleum production dropped significantly during the 1980s. Woodsboro's population was 1,829 in 1950 and 2,081 in 1960, then declined to 1,839 in 1970 before rising slightly to 1,974 in 1980. Woodsboro had fifty-two businesses in 1980, but by 1988 only thirty-three were reported in the town. In 1990 there were 1,731 residents.
