= Frank Allcock =

English footballer

Personal information
- Full name: Francis Edward Allcock
- Date of birth: 7 September 1925
- Place of birth: Nottingham, England
- Date of death: June 2005 (aged 79)
- Place of death: Nottingham, Nottinghamshire, England
- Height: 5 ft 11 in (1.80 m)
- Position: Left back

Youth career
- Beeston Boys Club

Senior career*
Years	Team	Apps	(Gls)
1945–1946	Nottingham Forest	0	(0)
1946–?	Aston Villa	0	(0)
?–1952	Cheltenham Town		
1952–1956	Bristol Rovers	59	(0)
- * Club domestic league appearances and goals

Francis Edward Allcock (7 September 1925 – June 2005) was a professional footballer, who played in The Football League for Bristol Rovers between 1952 and 1956.

Allcock, who was born in Nottingham, played youth team football for Beeston Boys Club, before joining local League side Nottingham Forest at the end of World War II. He spent a year with Forest prior to the resumption of normal Football League matches, and joined Aston Villa in 1946, where he failed to make an impression on the first team. He had a spell playing non-League football with Cheltenham Town, until returning to the professional game in 1952, when he joined Bristol Rovers.

In a four-year spell with The Pirates he played in 59 League games, before being forced to retire in 1956 with a serious knee injury.
