= Alf Calverley =

English footballer

Personal information
- Date of birth: 24 November 1917
- Place of birth: Huddersfield, England
- Date of death: October 1991 (aged 73)
- Place of death: Sheffield, England
- Position: Outside left

Youth career
- Huddersfield Town

Senior career*
Years	Team	Apps	(Gls)
1939−1940	Mossley	2	(0)
1940−1946	Huddersfield Town	0	(0)
1946−1947	Mansfield Town	30	(1)
1947	Arsenal	11	(0)
1947	Preston North End	13	(0)
1947−1953	Doncaster Rovers	142	(11)
- * Club domestic league appearances and goals

Alfred Godfrey Calverley (24 November 1917 − October 1991) was an English footballer who played as an outside left for several League clubs.

== Playing career ==
He joined his hometown team, Huddersfield Town from school, then moved to Mossley where he played a couple of games before returning to Huddersfield. He guested for several clubs during the Second World War, rejoining Huddersfield when it ended, though never made a League appearance for them and moved to Mansfield Town in June 1946.

Calverley was signed by Arsenal for £2,500 in March 1947. Preston North End, the opposition team in his debut game, had been so impressed by him that they persuaded Arsenal to sell him for £1,500 four months later.

Joining Second Division Doncaster Rovers for a then club record fee of £4,000 in November 1947, he was an influential figure in their 1949−50 Third Division (North) title triumph but injury problems curtailed his playing career in December 1952. He scored 13 times in his 153 League and cup appearances for Rovers.

== Death ==
He died in Sheffield towards the end of 1991.
