= Ken Kay =

English footballer

Personal information
- Full name: Kenneth Kay
- Date of birth: 9 March 1920
- Place of birth: Newark-on-Trent, England
- Date of death: 1986 (aged 65–66)
- Position: Winger

Senior career*
Years	Team	Apps	(Gls)
1946–1947	Ransome & Marles		
1947–1948	Mansfield Town	1	(0)
1948–1951	Ransome & Marles		
1951	Peterborough United		
Total		1	(0)
- * Club domestic league appearances and goals

Kenneth Kay (9 March 1920 – 1986) was an English professional footballer who played in the Football League for Mansfield Town.
