= Vic Cromack =

English footballer

Personal information
- Full name: Victor Cromack
- Date of birth: 17 March 1920
- Place of birth: Mansfield, England
- Date of death: 1984 (aged 63–64)
- Position: Goalkeeper

Senior career*
Years	Team	Apps	(Gls)
1945–1947	Mansfield Town	10	(0)
1948	Sutton Town		
Total		10	(0)
- * Club domestic league appearances and goals

Victor Cromack (17 March 1920 – 1984) was an English professional footballer who played in the Football League for Mansfield Town.
