= Moses Greenwood House =

Historic house in New Hampshire, United States

- U.S. National Register of Historic Places
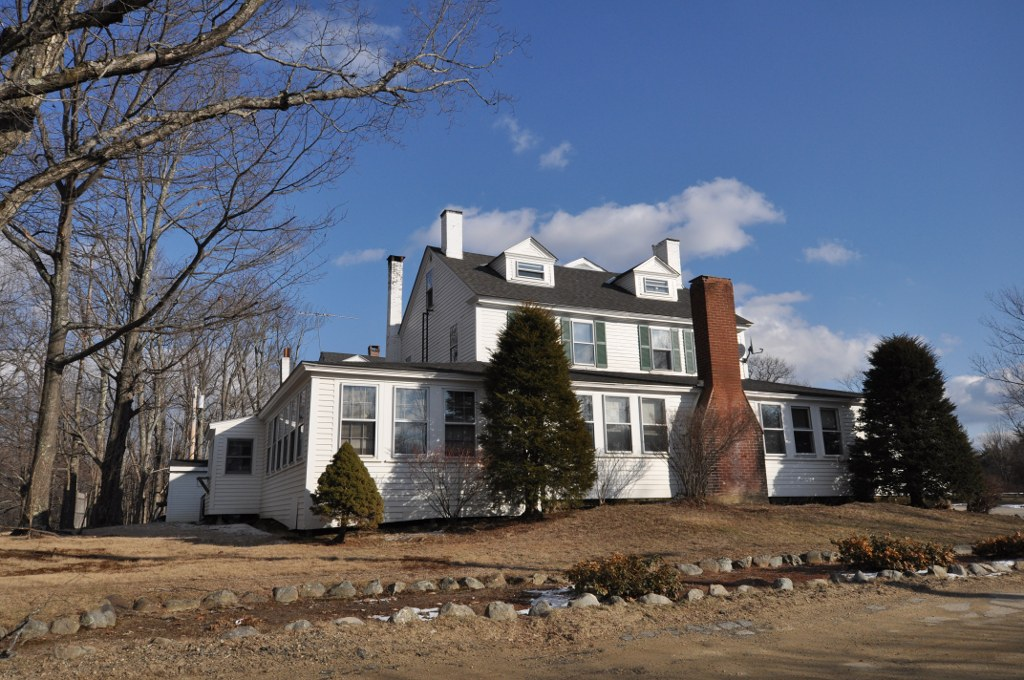

- Location within New Hampshire Location within the United States
- Location: Pierce and Old County Rds., Dublin, New Hampshire
- Coordinates: 42°54′16″N 72°2′33″W
- Area: 0.4 acres (0.16 ha)
- Built: 1787
- Architectural style: Colonial Revival
- MPS: Dublin MRA
- NRHP reference No.: 83004036
- Added to NRHP: December 15, 1983

The Moses Greenwood House, formerly the Dublin Inn, is a historic house at the corner of Pierce Road and Old County Road in Dublin, New Hampshire, United States. Built about 1783, it was substantially enlarged and converted into an inn in the early 20th century. The inn was the site of a meeting of notable Americans in 1945, who drafted the Dublin Declaration. The house was listed on the National Register of Historic Places in 1983.

== Description and history ==
The Moses Greenwood House is located in eastern Dublin, at the southeast corner of Old County and Pierce Roads. It is now a rambling 2 1/2-story frame structure, roughly H-shaped, but its shape is obscured by other additions and a single-story enclosed porch that encircles much of its exterior. Its roofs are studded with a variety of primarily gable-roofed dormers.

The oldest portion of this house was built c.1783 by Moses Greenwood, a veteran of the American Revolutionary War, and is a fairly conventional four-bay wood-frame structure. After being the Greenwood family home for a century, it was acquired by Mary Metcalfe, who added one wing in 1899, and Adele Thayer, who added a second wing in 1910. These additions, Georgian Revival in styling, were sympathetic to the style of the original house. It opened as the Dublin Inn in 1921.

In 1945, a group of American politicians, lawyers, and businessmen met at the inn, where they drafted the Dublin Declaration, a document calling for control of nuclear weapons and the broadening of the United Nations into a worldwide governing body. Attendees included future president John F. Kennedy. A second meeting, the Dublin Assembly on Peace, was held in October 1965. This event was hosted by Anna K. Yoss, owner of the Dublin Inn. The property was later adapted for use by a drug rehabilitation clinic.

== See also ==
- Isaac Greenwood House
- National Register of Historic Places listings in Cheshire County, New Hampshire
