= William Hill (footballer, born 1920) =

English footballer

Personal information
- Full name: William Henry Hill
- Date of birth: 15 March 1920
- Place of birth: Skegby, England
- Date of death: 1999 (aged 78–79)
- Position: Inside forward

Senior career*
Years	Team	Apps	(Gls)
1945–1946	Chesterfield	0	(0)
1946–1947	Skegby Miners Welfare		
1947–1948	Mansfield Town	2	(0)
1948	Teversal Colliery		
Total		2	(0)
- * Club domestic league appearances and goals

William Henry Hill (15 March 1920 – 1999) was an English professional footballer who played in the Football League for Mansfield Town.
