= Colin Cochrane =

English footballer

Personal information
- Full name: Colin Cochrane
- Date of birth: 26 August 1921
- Place of birth: Sutton-in-Ashfield, England
- Date of death: 1985 (aged 63–64)
- Position: Inside forward

Senior career*
Years	Team	Apps	(Gls)
1947–1948	Mansfield Town	1	(0)
Total		1	(0)
- * Club domestic league appearances and goals

Colin Cochrane (26 August 1921 – 1985) was an English professional footballer who played in the Football League for Mansfield Town.
