= Harry Everett =

English footballer

Personal information
- Full name: Harry Everett
- Date of birth: 11 November 1920
- Place of birth: Worksop, England
- Date of death: 1998 (aged 77–78)
- Position: Wing half

Senior career*
Years	Team	Apps	(Gls)
1944–1946	Warsop Main Colliery		
1946–1947	Mansfield Town	3	(0)
1947	Boston United		
Total		3	(0)
- * Club domestic league appearances and goals

Harry Everett (11 November 1920 – 1998) was an English professional footballer who played in the Football League for Mansfield Town.
