= Stan Mercer =

English footballer

Personal information
- Full name: Stan Mercer
- Date of birth: 11 September 1919
- Place of birth: Birkenhead, England
- Date of death: 2003 (aged 83–84)
- Position: Centre forward

Senior career*
Years	Team	Apps	(Gls)
1939–1943	Blackpool Services		
1943–1945	Blackpool		
1946–1947	Leicester City	1	(0)
1947–1949	Accrington Stanley	68	(36)
1948–1949	Mansfield Town	12	(6)
Total		81	(42)

Managerial career
- 1953–1955: Mansfield Town
- * Club domestic league appearances and goals

Stan Mercer (11 September 1919 – 2003) was an English professional footballer who played in the Football League for Accrington Stanley, Leicester City and Mansfield Town where he also had a spell as manager.
