= Frank Shell =

English footballer

Personal information
- Full name: Francis Henry Shell
- Date of birth: 2 January 1912
- Place of birth: Hackney, London, England
- Date of death: 1988 (aged 75–76)
- Position: Centre forward

Senior career*
| Years | Team | Apps | (Gls) |
| 1930–1936 | Barking Town | | |
| 1936–1937 | Ford Sports | | |
| 1937–1939 | Aston Villa | 23 | (8) |
| 1946 | Birmingham City | 0 | (0) |
| 1946–1947 | Hereford United | | |
| 1947–1948 | Mansfield Town | 22 | (1) |
| 1948 | Stafford Rangers | | |
| 1949 | Hinckley Athletic | | |
| Total | | 45 | (9) |
- * Club domestic league appearances and goals

Francis Henry Shell (2 January 1912 – 1988) was an English professional footballer who played in the Football League for Aston Villa and Mansfield Town.

Shell's career was interrupted by the outbreak of World War II. In September 1939, he played in the Villa Reserves last pre-war game at home to Derby County. On 4th September the Government announced a ban on Sport to prevent crowds gathering. Villa's League match away to Wolves was one of over thirty mid-week League fixtures called-off. Villa Park found itself in an evacuation district designated under the British Government's civilian evacuation scheme. The Police Chief Constable of Birmingham, C.C.H Moriarty, intimated that he would not sanction football matches within the city of Birmingham. The Football League's Scheme for War-time football proposed to limit gates to 8,000 in evacuation areas. With their large overheads, the directors of Aston Villa and Sunderland announced their intention to close down. The manager and players were paid off whilst Villa Park was commandeered by the War Office.
