= Sam Hodgson =

English footballer (1919 – 2000)

Sammy Hodgson
Personal information
- Full name: Samuel Hodgson
- Date of birth: 21 January 1919
- Place of birth: Seaham Harbour, England
- Date of death: 2000 (aged 80–81)
- Height: 5 ft 9 1/2 in (1.77 m)
- Position: Wing half

Senior career*
Years	Team	Apps	(Gls)
1935–1936	Seaham Colliery		
1936–1948	Grimsby Town	21	(0)
1948–1949	Mansfield Town	2	(0)
- * Club domestic league appearances and goals

Samuel Hodgson (21 January 1919 – 2000) was an English professional footballer who played as a wing half. Sammy's brother John Venner Hodgson also played for Grimsby Town and later Doncaster Rovers where he also became manager. Sammy followed his brother to Doncaster and later became trainer at Workington town AFC
