= Don Harper (footballer) =

English footballer

Personal information
- Full name: Donald Harper
- Date of birth: 26 October 1921
- Place of birth: Blackwell, Bolsover, England
- Date of death: 1990 (aged 68–69)
- Position: Winger

Senior career*
Years	Team	Apps	(Gls)
1945–1946	Chesterfield	0	(0)
1946–1947	Mansfield Town	21	(1)
Total		21	(1)
- * Club domestic league appearances and goals

Donald Harper (26 October 1921 – 1990) was an English professional footballer who played in the Football League for Mansfield Town.
