= Billy Wheatley =

English footballer

Personal information
- Full name: William Wheatley
- Date of birth: 5 November 1920
- Place of birth: Mansfield, England
- Date of death: 1965 (aged 44–45)
- Position: Winger

Senior career*
Years	Team	Apps	(Gls)
1946–1947	Nottingham Forest	0	(0)
1947	Huthwaite CWS		
1947	Mansfield Colliery		
1948–1949	Mansfield Town	38	(3)
Total		38	(3)
- * Club domestic league appearances and goals

William Wheatley (5 November 1920 – 1965) was an English professional footballer who played in the Football League for Mansfield Town.
