= Roy Brown (footballer, born 1917) =

English footballer

Personal information
- Full name: Albert Roy Brown
- Date of birth: 14 August 1917
- Place of birth: Nottingham, England
- Date of death: 31 January 2005 (aged 87)
- Place of death: Mansfield, England
- Height: 5 ft 10 1/2 in (1.79 m)
- Position: Winger

Senior career*
Years	Team	Apps	(Gls)
- Sneinton
1936–1939	Nottingham Forest	51	(7)
1946–1947	Wrexham	24	(3)
1947	Mansfield Town	17	(2)
- * Club domestic league appearances and goals

Albert Roy Brown (14 August 1917 – 31 January 2005) was an English professional footballer who played as a winger. He made appearances in the football league with Nottingham Forest, Wrexham and Mansfield Town.
