= Gordon Baird =

English footballer (1924–1999)

Personal information
- Full name: John Alfred Gordon Baird
- Date of birth: 14 January 1924
- Place of birth: Nottingham, England
- Date of death: 1999 (aged 74–75)
- Position: Wing half

Senior career*
Years	Team	Apps	(Gls)
1945	New Houghton		
1946–1948	Mansfield Town	9	(0)
1948	Sutton Town		
Total		9	(0)
- * Club domestic league appearances and goals

John Alfred Gordon Baird (14 January 1924 – 1999) was an English professional footballer who played in the Football League for Mansfield Town.
