= Les Smith (footballer, born 1921) =

English footballer

Personal information
- Full name: Leslie Smith
- Date of birth: 16 November 1921
- Place of birth: Tamworth, England
- Date of death: 1993 (aged 71–72)
- Position: Wing half

Senior career*
Years	Team	Apps	(Gls)
1944–1945	Nottingham Forest	0	(0)
1945–1948	Mansfield Town	38	(0)
1948	Ilkeston Town		
Total		38	(0)
- * Club domestic league appearances and goals

Leslie Smith (16 November 1921 – 1993) was an English professional footballer who played in the Football League for Mansfield Town.
