= Jim Harkin =

English footballer

Personal information
- Full name: James Harkin
- Date of birth: 8 August 1913
- Place of birth: Brinsworth, England
- Date of death: 1993 (aged 85–86)
- Position: Wing half

Senior career*
| Years | Team | Apps | (Gls) |
| 1932–1933 | Rossington Colliery | | |
| 1933–1934 | Denaby United | | |
| 1934–1935 | Doncaster Rovers | 1 | (0) |
| 1935–1936 | Rotherham United | 0 | (0) |
| 1936–1937 | Shrewsbury Town | | |
| 1938–1947 | Mansfield Town | 23 | (5) |
| 1947 | Gainsborough Trinity | | |
| 1948-1949 | Peterborough United | 30 | (1) |
| Total | | 54 | (6) |
- * Club domestic league appearances and goals

James Harkin (8 August 1913 – 1988) was an English professional footballer who played in the Football League for Doncaster Rovers and Mansfield Town.
