= Roy Cooling =

English footballer (1921–2003)

Personal information
- Full name: Roy Cooling
- Date of birth: 9 December 1921
- Place of birth: Barnsley, England
- Date of death: 10 April 2003 (aged 81)
- Place of death: Barnsley, England
- Position: Inside forward

Senior career*
Years	Team	Apps	(Gls)
- Mitchell Main Welfare
1942–1947	Barnsley	6	(3)
1947–1950	Mansfield Town	65	(14)
- * Club domestic league appearances and goals

Roy Cooling (9 December 1921 – 10 April 2003) was an English footballer who played as an inside forward. He played for Mitchell Main Welfare, Barnsley and Mansfield Town.
