= Charlie Croft =

English footballer

Personal information
- Full name: Charles Croft
- Date of birth: 26 November 1918
- Place of birth: Dewsbury, England
- Date of death: 2006 (aged 87–88)
- Position: Wing half

Senior career*
Years	Team	Apps	(Gls)
1939–1940	Huddersfield Town	0	(0)
1947–1950	Mansfield Town	85	(5)
1950	Boston United		
Total		62	(0)
- * Club domestic league appearances and goals

Charles Croft (26 November 1918 – 2006) was an English professional footballer who played in the Football League for Mansfield Town.
