= Bill Dallman =

English footballer

Personal information
- Full name: William Dallman
- Date of birth: 8 August 1918
- Place of birth: Mansfield, England
- Date of death: 1988 (aged 69–70)
- Position: Central defender

Senior career*
Years	Team	Apps	(Gls)
1937–1938	Rufford Colliery		
1938–1939	Notts County	0	(0)
1946–1948	Mansfield Town	5	(0)
1948	Bentinck Colliery Welfare		
Total		5	(0)
- * Club domestic league appearances and goals

William Dallman (8 August 1918 – 1988) was an English professional footballer who played in the Football League for Mansfield Town.
