= Eric Bryant (footballer) =

English footballer

Personal information
- Full name: Eric Bryant
- Date of birth: 18 November 1921
- Place of birth: Birmingham, England
- Date of death: December 1995 (aged 74)
- Place of death: Poole, Dorset, England
- Position: Centre forward

Senior career*
Years	Team	Apps	(Gls)
1946–1948	Mansfield Town	35	(17)
1948–1949	Yeovil Town		
1949–1951	Plymouth Argyle	11	(4)
1951–1952	Leyton Orient	12	(1)
1952–1953	Chelmsford City	24	(12)
1953–1955	Dorchester Town	47	(48)
- Bideford
- Poole Town
- * Club domestic league appearances and goals

Eric Bryant (18 November 1921 – December 1995) was an English footballer who played league football for Mansfield Town, Plymouth Argyle and Leyton Orient.

He is also notable for scoring the winning goal for non-league Yeovil Town in their FA Cup victory against Sunderland in 1949. In October 1949, Bryant was signed by Plymouth from Yeovil for a fee of £3,000.
