= Freddie Hogg =

English footballer

Personal information
- Full name: Frederick Hogg
- Date of birth: 24 April 1918
- Place of birth: Bishop Auckland, England
- Date of death: 2001 (aged 79–80)
- Position: Inside forward

Senior career*
Years	Team	Apps	(Gls)
1936–1937	West Auckland Town		
1937–1938	Luton Town	4	(0)
1945–1947	Mansfield Town	45	(8)
1947–1950	Halifax Town	49	(2)
1950	Wigan Athletic		
Total		98	(10)
- * Club domestic league appearances and goals

Frederick Hogg (24 April 1918 – 2001) was an English professional footballer who played in the Football League for Halifax Town, Luton Town and Mansfield Town.
