= Bayside, Texas =

- Town
- Interactive map of Bayside, Texas
- Location within Texas Location within the United States Location within North America
- Coordinates: 28°5′48″N 97°12′42″W
- Country: United States
- State: Texas
- County: Refugio

Area
  - Total: 1.09 sq mi (2.82 km^{2})
  - Land: 1.02 sq mi (2.63 km^{2})
  - Water: 0.073 sq mi (0.19 km^{2})
- Elevation: 16 ft (5 m)

Population (2020)
  - Total: 275
  - Density: 271/sq mi (105/km^{2})
- Time zone: UTC-6 (Central (CST))
  - Summer (DST): UTC-5 (CDT)
- ZIP code: 78340
- Area code: 361
- FIPS code: 48-06104
- GNIS feature ID: 1330169
- Website: baysidetx.gov

Bayside is a town in southern Refugio County, in the U.S. state of Texas. The population was 275 at the 2020 census.

== History ==
The town was established in 1908 by E.O. Burton and A.H. Danforth.

== Geography ==
Bayside is located on the west side of Copano Bay at 28°5′48″N 97°12′42″W (28.096591, –97.211589). The town is near the mouth of the Aransas River, a small stream that runs from its origins in Bee County and marks the boundary between Refugio County and San Patricio County.

According to the United States Census Bureau, the town has a total area of 1.1 square miles (2.8 km^{2}), of which 1.0 square mile (2.6 km^{2}) is land and 0.1 square miles (0.26 km^{2}) (6.31%) is water.

== Demographics ==
Historical population
Census	Pop.	Note	%±
1980	381		—
1990	400		5.0%
2000	360		−10.0%
2010	325		−9.7%
2020	275		−15.4%
U.S. Decennial Census; 2020 Census

As of the census of 2000, there were 360 people, 153 households, and 102 families residing in the town. The population density was 346.0 inhabitants per square mile (133.6/km^{2}). There were 266 housing units at an average density of 255.6 per square mile (98.7/km^{2}). The racial makeup of the town was 89.44% White, 1.94% African American, 0.56% Native American, 7.50% from other races, and 0.56% from two or more races. Hispanic or Latino of any race were 27.50% of the population.

There were 153 households, out of which 26.8% had children under the age of 18 living with them, 54.9% were married couples living together, 3.9% had a female householder with no husband present, and 33.3% were non-families. 31.4% of all households were made up of individuals, and 12.4% had someone living alone who was 65 years of age or older. The average household size was 2.35 and the average family size was 2.94.

In the town, the population was spread out, with 22.5% under the age of 18, 7.2% from 18 to 24, 28.1% from 25 to 44, 26.4% from 45 to 64, and 15.8% who were 65 years of age or older. The median age was 41 years. For every 100 females, there were 102.2 males. For every 100 females age 18 and over, there were 111.4 males.

The median income for a household in the town was $26,875, and the median income for a family was $37,500. Males had a median income of $30,000 versus $18,750 for females. The per capita income for the town was $13,546. About 20.2% of families and 22.3% of the population were below the poverty line, including 26.0% of those under age 18 and 38.0% of those age 65 or over.

== Education ==
The Town of Bayside is served by the Woodsboro Independent School District.

== Trivia ==
Bayside has the same zip code as Les Clayes-sous-Bois (France).
