= William Chadbourne =

English footballer

Personal information
- Full name: William Chadbourne
- Date of birth: 29 October 1922
- Place of birth: Mansfield, England
- Date of death: 1988 (aged 65–66)
- Position: Inside forward

Senior career*
Years	Team	Apps	(Gls)
1945	South Normanton Miners Welfare		
1946–1948	Mansfield Town	9	(3)
1948	Sutton Town		
Total		9	(3)
- * Club domestic league appearances and goals

William Chadbourne (29 October 1922 – 1988) was an English professional footballer who played in the Football League for Mansfield Town.
