= John Woods House (Pittsburgh, Pennsylvania) =

Historic house in Pennsylvania, United States

- U.S. National Register of Historic Places
- City of Pittsburgh Historic Structure
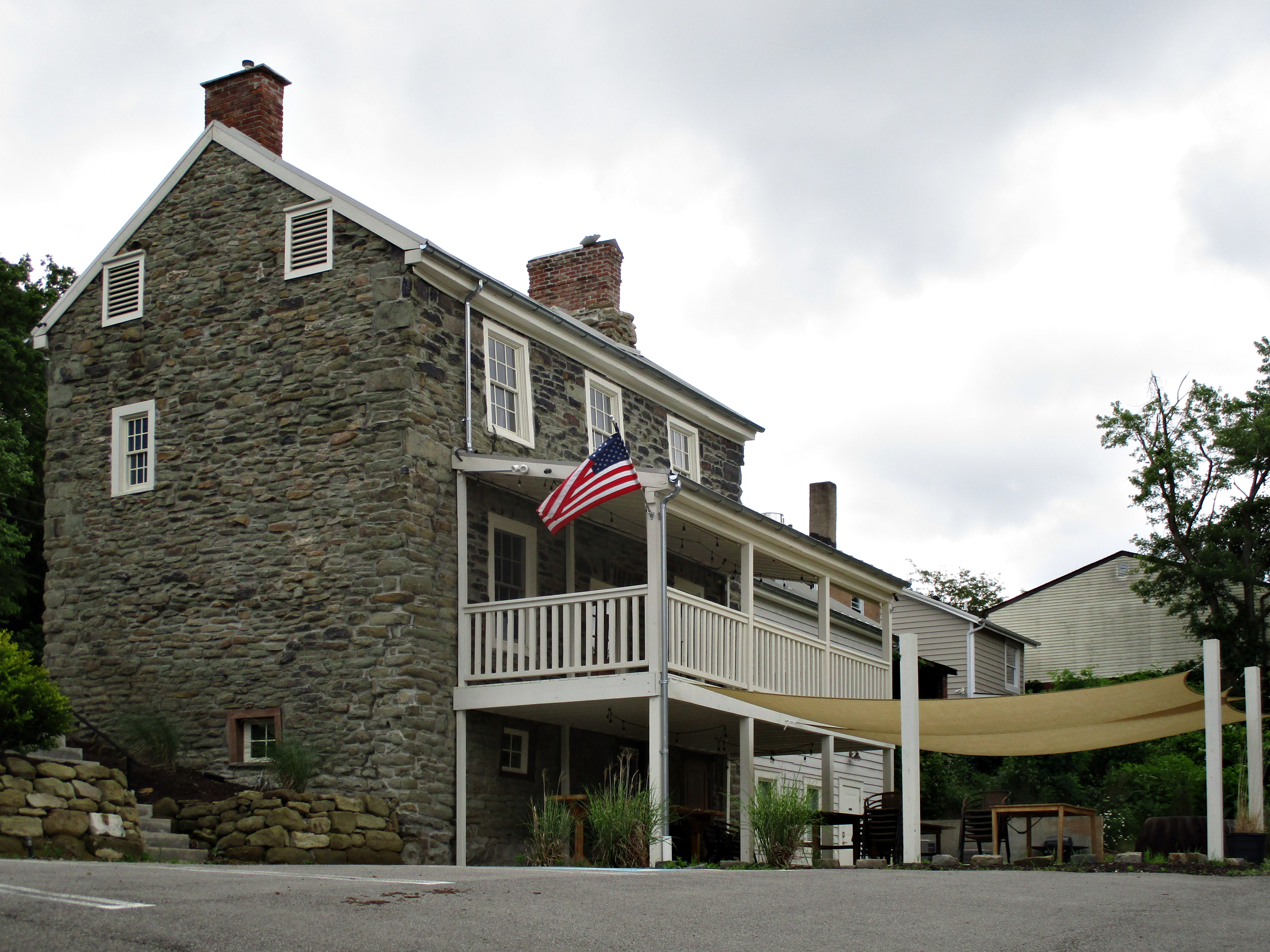

- Location within Pittsburgh Location within Pennsylvania Location within the United States
- Location: 4604 Monongahela Street (Hazelwood), Pittsburgh, Pennsylvania, USA
- Coordinates: 40°24′53.08″N 79°56′40.62″W
- Built: 1792
- Architectural style: Vernacular
- NRHP reference No.: 93000353

Significant dates
- Added to NRHP: April 29, 1993
- Designated CPHS: February 22, 1977

The John Woods House at 4604 Monongahela Street in the Hazelwood neighborhood of Pittsburgh, Pennsylvania, is a vernacular stone house that was built in 1792. It was added to the List of City of Pittsburgh historic designations by Pittsburgh City Council on February 22, 1977. On April 29, 1993, it was added to the National Register of Historic Places.

John Woods (1761–1816) was a political leader, a Federalist, and a member of a prominent founding Pittsburgh family. He was the son of Colonel George Woods of Bedford County, Pennsylvania. "The elder Woods laid out the plan for the City of Pittsburgh in 1784. John did the actual drafting, and the plan is referred to as the 'John Woods plan of Pittsburgh.'" John Woods was elected to the Pennsylvania Senate in 1797, and was elected as a Representative to the Fourteenth United States Congress, holding office from March 4, 1815, to March 3, 1817 (though, due to illness, he never attended sessions). The house stayed in the Woods family until 1885.

Composer Stephen Foster was friends with the Woods family, and his song "Nelly Bly", written circa 1849 and published in 1850, was inspired by a servant girl who worked at the Woods house. The song was composed on Rachel Keller Woods' piano, on which Foster is said to have written other classics (including "Jeanie with the Light Brown Hair"), and the instrument is currently housed at the Stephen Foster Memorial in Pittsburgh.

This house is currently owned by the Urban Redevelopment Authority (URA). As of December 2020, the house was opened to the public as a Scottish pub.
