= Walter Edwards (footballer) =

English footballer (1924–2018)

Personal information
- Full name: Walter Edwards
- Date of birth: 26 June 1924
- Place of birth: Mansfield Woodhouse, England
- Date of death: 5 December 2018 (aged 94)
- Position: Winger

Senior career*
| Years | Team | Apps | (Gls) |
| 1946–1947 | Mansfield Woodhouse | | |
| 1947–1949 | Mansfield Town | 25 | (5) |
| 1949–1950 | Leeds United | 2 | (0) |
| 1950–1951 | Leicester City | 0 | (0) |
| 1951 | Rochdale | 0 | (0) |
| 1951 | Boston United | | |
| Total | | 27 | (5) |
- * Club domestic league appearances and goals

Walter Edwards (26 June 1924 – 5 November 2018) was an English professional footballer who played in the Football League for Leeds United and Mansfield Town.
