= Col. Henry Hewitt Wood House =

Historic house in West Virginia, United States

- U.S. National Register of Historic Places
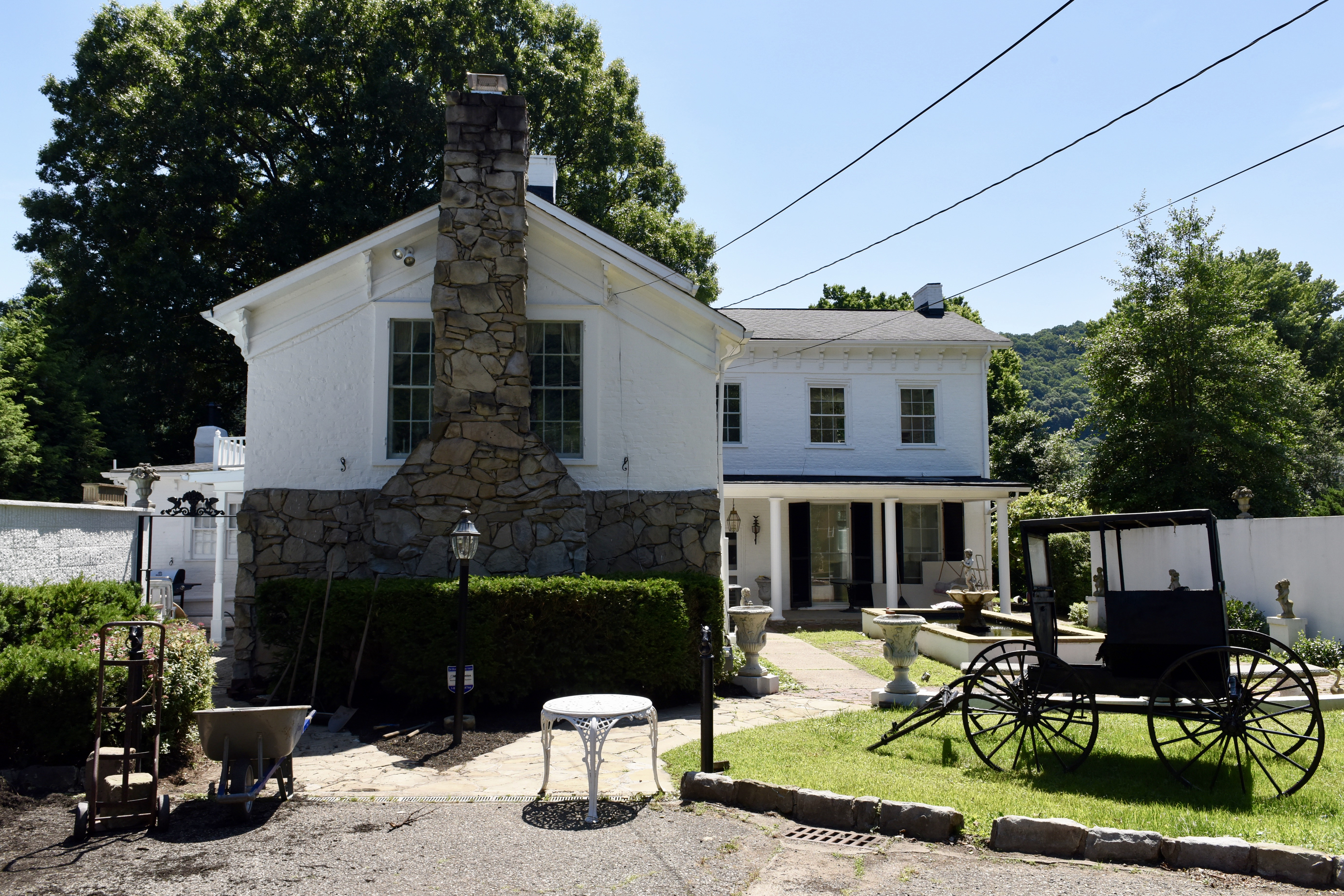

- Location within West Virginia Location within the United States
- Location: 6560 Roosevelt Ave., SE, Charleston, West Virginia
- Coordinates: 38°18′0″N 81°33′46″W
- Built: 1829
- NRHP reference No.: 80004027
- Added to NRHP: November 28, 1980

Col. Henry Hewitt Wood House is a historic home located at Charleston, West Virginia. It is a two-story, white- painted brick house was formerly the seat of a large farmland and built in 1829-31 for Colonel Henry Hewitt Wood, a leading saltmaker. It is a slightly modified L-shaped dwelling. The major elevation facing the Kanawha River is symmetrically divided among five bays and is centered with an especially broad entrance.

It was listed on the National Register of Historic Places in 1980.
