= Ernest Bramley =

English footballer

Personal information
- Full name: Ernest Bramley
- Date of birth: 29 August 1920
- Place of birth: Mansfield, England
- Date of death: 1993 (aged 72–73)
- Position: Full back

Senior career*
Years	Team	Apps	(Gls)
1937–1938	Bolsover Colliery		
1938–1948	Mansfield Town	45	(1)
Total		45	(1)
- * Club domestic league appearances and goals

Ernest Bramley (29 August 1920 – 1993) was an English professional footballer who played in the Football League for Mansfield Town.
