= Harry Hewitt (English footballer) =

English footballer

Personal information
- Full name: Harold Hewitt
- Date of birth: 24 June 1919
- Place of birth: Chesterfield, England
- Date of death: 2011 (aged 91–92)
- Position: Winger

Senior career*
Years	Team	Apps	(Gls)
1944–1945	Chesterfield	0	(0)
1945–1947	Mansfield Town	1	(0)
1947	Grantham		
Total		1	(0)
- * Club domestic league appearances and goals

Harold Hewitt (24 June 1919 – 2011) was an English professional footballer who played in the Football League for Mansfield Town.
