= Johnny Grogan =

Scottish footballer

Personal information
- Full name: John Grogan
- Date of birth: 30 October 1915
- Place of birth: Paisley, Scotland
- Date of death: 2 April 1976 (aged 60)
- Place of death: Leicester, England
- Height: 5 ft 9 in (1.75 m)
- Position: Central defender

Senior career*
Years	Team	Apps	(Gls)
1930–1931	St Mirin's Boys Guild		
1931–1932	Paisley Carlisle		
1932–1935	Shawfield		
1935–1947	Leicester City	46	(0)
1947–1951	Mansfield Town	201	(0)
1951	Bentley Engineering		
Total		247	(0)
- * Club domestic league appearances and goals

John Grogan (30 October 1915 – 2 April 1976) was a Scottish professional footballer who played in the Football League for Leicester City and Mansfield Town.
