= Harry Searson =

English footballer

Personal information
- Full name: Harold Searson
- Date of birth: 3 June 1924
- Place of birth: Mansfield, England
- Date of death: 5 January 2013 (aged 88)
- Position: Goalkeeper

Senior career*
Years	Team	Apps	(Gls)
1941–1947	Sheffield Wednesday		
1947–1948	Mansfield Town		
1949–1952	Leeds United	104	(0)
1952–1954	York City	63	(0)
- * Club domestic league appearances and goals

Harold Searson (3 June 1924 – 5 January 2013) was an English footballer, who played as a goalkeeper with Leeds United where he made 116 appearances from 1949 to 1952. Searson also played for Sheffield Wednesday, Mansfield Town and York City.

Searson died in January 2013 from cancer.
