= Ray Devey =

English footballer (1917–2001)

Personal information
- Full name: Raymond Devey
- Date of birth: 19 December 1917
- Place of birth: Birmingham, England
- Date of death: 26 June 2001 (aged 83)
- Place of death: England
- Height: 5 ft 7 in (1.70 m)
- Position: Centre half

Youth career
- Shirley Juniors
- Birmingham

Senior career*
Years	Team	Apps	(Gls)
1937–1947	Birmingham City	1	(0)
1947–1950	Mansfield Town	76	(4)
1950–195?	Hereford United		
- * Club domestic league appearances and goals

Raymond Devey (19 December 1917 – 26 June 2001) was an English professional footballer who played in the Football League for Birmingham City and Mansfield Town. He played as a centre half.

Devey was born in the Tyseley district of Birmingham. He joined Birmingham as a junior, and turned professional in 1937. The Second World War put a stop to his career development, and he finally made his Football League debut on 21 September 1946, at the age of 28, deputising for Arthur Turner in a Second Division game at home to Newport County which finished as a 1–1 draw. Devey joined Mansfield Town at the start of the 1947–48 season, and he played 76 games in the Third Division North before finishing off his playing career with a brief spell at non-league Hereford United.

Devey returned to Birmingham City, where he spent the remainder of his working life, performing a variety of backroom roles including reserve team trainer and coach, first-team trainer, physiotherapist and kit-man. He retired in 1983. He died in 2001 at the age of 83.
