= Ken Allcock =

English footballer

Personal information
- Full name: Kenneth Allcock
- Date of birth: 10 April 1921
- Place of birth: Kirkby-in-Ashfield, England
- Date of death: 1996 (aged 74–75)
- Position: Centre forward

Senior career*
Years	Team	Apps	(Gls)
1946–1947	Notts County	0	(0)
1947–1948	Mansfield Town	1	(0)
Total		1	(0)
- * Club domestic league appearances and goals

Kenneth Allcock (10 April 1921 – 1996) was an English professional footballer who played in the Football League for Mansfield Town.
