= John Wood House (Huntington Station, New York) =

Historic house in New York, United States

- U.S. National Register of Historic Places
- Location within New York Location within the United States
- Location: 121 McKay Rd., Huntington Station, New York
- Coordinates: 40°51′10″N 73°25′29″W
- Area: 3 acres (1.2 ha)
- Built: ca. 1690
- MPS: Huntington Town MRA
- NRHP reference No.: 85002554
- Added to NRHP: September 26, 1985

John Wood House is a historic home located at Huntington Station in Suffolk County, New York. It was built about 1704 and is a four bay, one story dwelling which has a saltbox profile and massive central chimney. Also on the property is a gable roofed well structure.

It was added to the National Register of Historic Places in 1985.
