= George Banks (footballer) =

English footballer

Personal information
- Full name: George Ernest Banks
- Date of birth: 28 March 1919
- Place of birth: Wednesbury, England
- Date of death: 1991 (aged 71–72)
- Position: Full back

Senior career*
Years	Team	Apps	(Gls)
1935–1938	Brownhills Athletic		
1938–1940	West Bromwich Albion	1	(2)
1947–1949	Mansfield Town	63	(21)
1949	Hereford United		
1950	Dudley Town		
1951	Darlaston		
Total		64	(23)
- * Club domestic league appearances and goals

George Ernest Banks (28 March 1919 – 1991) was an English professional footballer who played in the Football League for Mansfield Town and West Bromwich Albion.
