= 1958–59 Mansfield Town F.C. season =

Mansfield Town
1958–59 season
- Manager: Sam Weaver
- Stadium: Field Mill
- Third Division: 20th
- FA Cup: First round

The 1958–59 season was Mansfield Town's 21st season in the Football League and 1st season in the newly formed Third Division, they finished in 20th position with 46 points, avoiding relegation by 5 points.

== Final league table ==
Pos	Team	Pld	W	D	L	GF	GA	GAv	Pts	Promotion or relegation
18	Wrexham	46	14	14	18	63	77	0.818	42	
19	Accrington Stanley	46	15	12	19	71	87	0.816	42	
20	Mansfield Town	46	14	13	19	73	98	0.745	41	
21	Stockport County (R)	46	13	10	23	65	78	0.833	36	Relegation to the Fourth Division
22	Doncaster Rovers (R)	46	14	5	27	50	90	0.556	33	Relegation to the Fourth Division

(R) Relegated

== Results ==
=== Football League Third Division ===
Match	Date	Opponent	Venue	Result	Attendance	Scorers
1	23 August 1958	Southampton	H	1–6	14,038	Delapenha
2	27 August 1958	Bradford City	A	1–1	10,939	Fraser
3	30 August 1958	Accrington Stanley	A	0–2	6,096	
4	1 September 1958	Bradford City	H	2–1	10,123	Thomas, Kemp
5	6 September 1958	Halifax Town	H	4–3	9,757	Thomas, Keery, Delapenha, Uphill
6	9 September 1958	Brentford	A	0–2	13,625	
7	13 September 1958	Newport County	A	0–1	8,482	
8	15 September 1958	Brentford	H	1–1	9,159	Wilson (o.g.)
9	20 September 1958	Chesterfield	H	2–1	15,952	Delapenha, Anderson
10	22 September 1958	Wrexham	H	3–1	7,871	Uphill (2), Vaughan
11	27 September 1958	Notts County	A	4–3	16,510	Keery, Vaughan, Uphill, Kilford (o.g.)
12	1 October 1958	Wrexham	A	1–2	10,022	Uphill
13	4 October 1958	Queens Park Rangers	H	3–4	10,033	Uphill, Keery (2)
14	11 October 1958	Doncaster Rovers	A	2–0	10,672	Uphill, Delapenha
15	18 October 1958	Plymouth Argyle	H	1–4	12,492	Downie
16	25 October 1958	Tranmere Rovers	A	2–2	11,859	Uphill, Thomas
17	1 November 1958	Stockport County	H	2–1	8,275	Thomas (2)
18	8 November 1958	Reading	A	3–3	13,559	Uphill, Downie, Thomas
19	22 November 1958	Southend United	A	1–5	9,337	Uphill
20	13 December 1958	Bury	H	0–2	5,772	
21	20 December 1958	Southampton	A	2–3	17,901	Uphill, Thomas
22	26 December 1958	Hull City	A	2–5	20,836	Thomas (2)
23	27 December 1958	Hull City	H	1–1	7,916	Delapenha
24	3 January 1959	Accrington Stanley	H	3–2	6,815	Thomas (2), Griffiths
25	17 January 1959	Halifax Town	A	0–0	3,260	
26	24 January 1959	Bournemouth & Boscombe Athletic	A	3–3	10,338	Thomas (2), Delapenha
27	31 January 1959	Newport County	H	2–1	8,347	Thomas (2)
28	2 February 1959	Colchester United	H	3–2	4,655	Delapenha, Uphill (2)
29	7 February 1959	Chesterfield	A	1–3	10,120	Thomas
30	14 February 1959	Notts County	H	3–0	13,376	Thomas, Delapenha, Butler (o.g.)
31	21 February 1959	Queens Park Rangers	A	1–1	5,007	Thomas
32	28 February 1959	Doncaster Rovers	H	3–1	8,111	Thomas, Delapenha, Uphill
33	7 March 1959	Plymouth Argyle	A	3–8	17,595	Downie (2), Ripley
34	14 March 1959	Tranmere Rovers	H	0–2	5,623	
35	21 March 1959	Stockport County	A	1–4	6,394	Griffiths
36	27 March 1959	Rochdale	A	2–2	3,537	Griffiths, Uphill
37	28 March 1959	Reading	H	1–0	6,274	Williams
38	30 March 1959	Rochdale	H	0–0	5,863	
39	4 April 1959	Colchester United	A	3–1	5,901	Uphill (2), Thomas
40	6 April 1959	Norwich City	H	1–1	7,729	Nugent
41	11 April 1959	Southend United	H	1–4	7,143	Uphill
42	13 April 1959	Swindon Town	H	0–0	5,717	
43	18 April 1959	Norwich City	A	0–1	21,228	
44	22 April 1959	Swindon Town	A	1–2	7,303	Uphill
45	25 April 1959	Bournemouth & Boscombe Athletic	H	1–4	3,703	Nugent
46	28 April 1959	Bury	A	2–2	5,421	Thomas, Hall

=== FA Cup ===
Round	Date	Opponent	Venue	Result	Attendance	Scorers
R1	15 November 1958	Bradford City	H	3–4	9,313	Thomas, Uphill (2)

== Squad statistics ==
- Squad list sourced from 1958–59 Mansfield Town F.C. season at the English National Football Archive (subscription required)

Pos.	Name	League		FA Cup		Total	
Pos.	Name	Apps	Goals	Apps	Goals	Apps	Goals
GK	(England) Ray Kirkham	16	0	0	0	16	0
GK	(England) Vince McBride	10	0	1	0	11	0
GK	(England) Terry Statham	20	0	0	0	20	0
DF	(England) Charlie Billington	1	0	0	0	1	0
DF	(England) Don Bradley	23	0	1	0	24	0
DF	(England) Brian Hall	2	1	0	0	2	1
DF	(England) Ray Hogg	1	0	0	0	1	0
DF	(England) Brian Lambert	2	0	0	0	2	0
DF	(England) Ken Mellor	32	0	1	0	33	0
DF	(England) Keith Savin	31	0	0	0	31	0
DF	(England) Terry Swinscoe	3	0	0	0	3	0
DF	(England) Joe Thomas	28	0	1	0	29	0
DF	(England) Colin Toon	17	0	0	0	17	0
MF	(England) Brian Jayes	19	0	1	0	20	0
MF	(England) Stan Keery	11	4	0	0	11	4
MF	(England) Keith Ripley	12	1	0	0	12	1
MF	(England) Sid Watson	24	0	1	0	25	0
MF	(England) Robert Williams	29	1	0	0	29	1
FW	(England) Robbie Anderson	18	1	1	0	19	1
FW	(Jamaica) Lindy Delapenha	39	9	1	0	40	9
FW	(England) Johnny Downie	18	4	0	0	18	4
FW	(Scotland) David Fraser	6	1	0	0	6	1
FW	(England) Ken Griffiths	28	3	1	0	29	3
FW	(England) Ivan Hollett	2	0	0	0	2	0
FW	(England) Sam Kemp	3	1	0	0	3	1
FW	(England) Cliff Nugent	27	2	0	0	27	2
FW	(England) Barrie Thomas	34	21	1	1	35	22
FW	(England) Dennis Uphill	44	19	1	2	45	21
FW	(Wales) Terry Vaughan	6	2	0	0	6	2
–	Own goals	–	3	–	0	–	3
