= 1957–58 Mansfield Town F.C. season =

Mansfield Town
1957–58 season
- Manager: Charlie Mitten
- Stadium: Field Mill
- Third Division North: 6th
- FA Cup: Third Round

The 1957–58 season was Mansfield Town's 20th season in the Football League and 15th season in the Third Division North, they finished in 6th position with 52 points. At the end of the season the Third Division North and Third Division South were merged to form the Third Division and Fourth Division.

== Final league table ==
Pos	Team	Pld	W	D	L	GF	GA	GAv	Pts	Promotion or relegation
4	Bury	46	23	10	13	94	62	1.516	56	Qualification for the Third Division
5	Hull City	46	19	15	12	78	67	1.164	53	Qualification for the Third Division
6	Mansfield Town	46	22	8	16	100	92	1.087	52	Qualification for the Third Division
7	Halifax Town	46	20	11	15	83	69	1.203	51	Qualification for the Third Division
8	Chesterfield	46	18	15	13	71	69	1.029	51	Qualification for the Third Division

Source: rsssf.com

== Results ==
=== Football League Third Division North ===
Match	Date	Opponent	Venue	Result	Attendance	Scorers
1	24 August 1957	Rochdale	H	2–4	9,925	Uphill, Mitten
2	27 August 1957	Carlisle United	A	4–3	11,149	Uphill (2), Chapman (2)
3	31 August 1957	Crewe Alexandra	A	0–1	6,047	
4	2 September 1957	Carlisle United	H	2–0	9,674	Chapman, Keery
5	7 September 1957	Wrexham	H	2–1	7,752	Chapman, Thomas
6	9 September 1957	Stockport County	H	2–2	8,549	Keery, Mitten
7	14 September 1957	Scunthorpe & Lindsey United	A	3–3	9,533	Keery, Thomas, Bushby (o.g.)
8	16 September 1957	Stockport County	A	3–3	8,613	Mitten (2), Thomas
9	21 September 1957	Darlington	H	4–2	7,869	Thomas, Chapman (2), Morris
10	23 September 1957	Hull City	A	1–3	6,860	Morris
11	30 September 1957	Hull City	H	1–1	7,878	Keery
12	5 October 1957	Bradford Park Avenue	H	2–1	7,753	Morris, Thomas
13	12 October 1957	Tranmere Rovers	A	2–1	11,072	Morris, Thomas
14	19 October 1957	York City	H	2–1	7,913	Morris, Mitten
15	26 October 1957	Barrow	A	1–2	6,251	Uphill
16	2 November 1957	Oldham Athletic	H	4–4	7,809	Uphill, Morris, Chapman (2)
17	9 November 1957	Bury	A	2–0	11,895	Chapman (2)
18	23 November 1957	Chester	A	2–1	7,096	Chapman, Thomas
19	30 November 1957	Chesterfield	H	1–1	12,575	Keery
20	14 December 1957	Hartlepools United	H	5–1	8,097	Keery (2), Chapman, Morris (2)
21	21 December 1957	Rochdale	A	0–3	4,371	
22	25 December 1957	Bradford City	H	5–2	7,950	Keery, Chapman, Mitten, Morris, Watson
23	26 December 1957	Bradford City	A	1–1	17,452	Watson
24	28 December 1957	Crewe Alexandra	H	2–1	10,254	Watson, Chapman
25	11 January 1958	Wrexham	A	2–4	6,931	Watson, Thomas
26	18 January 1958	Scunthorpe & Lindsey United	H	3–5	8,415	Keery (2), Chapman
27	25 January 1958	Accrington Stanley	H	0–2	7,154	
28	1 February 1958	Darlington	A	0–2	6,101	
29	15 February 1958	Bradford Park Avenue	A	2–0	8,629	Thomas (2)
30	22 February 1958	Chester	H	3–1	7,603	Morris, Griffiths
31	1 March 1958	York City	A	1–3	6,002	Uphill
32	8 March 1958	Barrow	H	4–2	5,239	Mitten, Morris, Thomas (2)
33	10 March 1958	Workington	H	6–3	4,911	Mitten (2), Uphill (2), Griffiths (2)
34	15 March 1958	Oldham Athletic	A	1–1	6,054	Thomas
35	22 March 1958	Tranmere Rovers	H	4–1	7,255	Thomas, Keery, Morris (2)
36	29 March 1958	Accrington Stanley	A	1–4	5,290	Thomas
37	31 March 1958	Southport	A	1–4	1,405	Thomas
38	5 April 1958	Southport	H	3–0	6,658	Thomas, Uphill (2)
39	7 April 1958	Halifax Town	H	2–1	8,236	Thomas, Jayes
40	8 April 1958	Halifax Town	A	0–4	6,116	
41	12 April 1958	Chesterfield	A	4–1	12,279	Keery, Thomas, Morris (2)
42	14 April 1958	Gateshead	A	1–2	3,258	Uphill
43	19 April 1958	Bury	H	6–4	10,354	Uphill, Mitten, Keery, Thomas (3)
44	23 April 1958	Workington	A	0–4	2,700	
45	26 April 1958	Hartlepools United	A	0–2	4,922	
46	28 April 1958	Gateshead	H	3–0	7,478	Mitten, Uphill, Thomas

=== FA Cup ===
Round	Date	Opponent	Venue	Result	Attendance	Scorers
R1	16 November 1957	Halifax Town	H	2–0	9,697	Chapman, Mitten
R2	7 December 1957	Wigan Athletic	A	1–1	12,900	Chapman
R2 Replay	11 December 1957	Wigan Athletic	H	3–1	5,576	Mitten, Morris (2)
R3	4 January 1958	Bristol Rovers	A	0–5	20,446	

== Squad statistics ==
- Squad list sourced from 1957–58 Mansfield Town F.C. season at the English National Football Archive (subscription required)

Pos.	Name	League		FA Cup		Total	
Pos.	Name	Apps	Goals	Apps	Goals	Apps	Goals
GK	(Wales) Frank Elliot	27	0	4	0	31	0
GK	(England) Ray Kirkham	18	0	0	0	18	0
GK	(England) Terry Statham	1	0	0	0	1	0
DF	(England) Don Bradley	5	0	0	0	5	0
DF	(England) Ralph Cann	1	0	0	0	1	0
DF	(England) Derek Chamberlain	19	0	3	0	22	0
DF	(England) Ken Mellor	34	0	4	0	38	0
DF	(England) Alan Rushby	8	0	0	0	8	0
DF	(England) Keith Savin	37	0	4	0	41	0
DF	(England) Terry Swinscoe	6	0	1	0	7	0
DF	(England) Joe Thomas	13	0	0	0	13	0
DF	(England) Colin Toon	7	0	0	0	7	0
MF	(Northern Ireland) Sammy Chapman	29	15	4	2	33	17
MF	(England) Charlie Crowe	24	0	4	0	28	0
MF	(England) Brian Jayes	34	1	4	0	38	1
MF	(England) Stan Keery	42	13	4	0	46	13
MF	(England) Sid Watson	25	4	2	0	27	4
MF	(England) Robert Williams	12	0	0	0	12	0
FW	(England) Robbie Anderson	4	0	1	0	5	0
FW	(England) Jimmy Glazzard	1	0	1	0	2	0
FW	(England) Ken Griffiths	14	4	0	0	14	4
FW	(England) Charlie Mitten	38	11	4	2	42	13
FW	(England) John Mitten	3	0	0	0	3	0
FW	(England) Fred Morris	46	15	4	2	50	17
FW	(England) Barrie Thomas	32	23	0	0	32	23
FW	(England) Dennis Uphill	26	13	0	0	26	13
–	Own goals	–	1	–	0	–	1
