= 1956–57 Mansfield Town F.C. season =

Mansfield Town
1956–57 season
- Manager: Charlie Mitten
- Stadium: Field Mill
- Third Division North: 16th
- FA Cup: First Round

The 1956–57 season was Mansfield Town's 19th season in the Football League and 14th season in the Third Division North, they finished in 16th position with 44 points.

== Final league table ==
Pos	Team	Pld	W	D	L	GF	GA	GAv	Pts
14	Scunthorpe & Lindsey United	46	15	15	16	71	69	1.029	45
15	Carlisle United	46	16	13	17	76	85	0.894	45
16	Mansfield Town	46	17	10	19	91	90	1.011	44
17	Gateshead	46	17	10	19	72	90	0.800	44
18	Darlington	46	17	8	21	82	95	0.863	42

Source: rsssf.com

== Results ==
=== Football League Third Division North ===
Match	Date	Opponent	Venue	Result	Attendance	Scorers
1	18 August 1956	Stockport County	A	1–2	6,375	Darwin
2	20 August 1956	Rochdale	H	2–3	13,441	Smith, Berry
3	25 August 1956	Carlisle United	H	5–1	8,057	Darwin (2), Jepson (2), Smith
4	29 August 1956	Rochdale	A	0–0	7,360	
5	1 September 1956	Accrington Stanley	A	3–3	9,817	Darwin, Smith, Jepson
6	3 September 1956	Bradford City	H	3–1	12,201	Darwin, Jepson (2)
7	8 September 1956	Tranmere Rovers	H	3–0	11,383	Darwin, Jepson (2)
8	12 September 1956	Bradford City	A	3–4	9,322	Darwin, Jepson, Mitten
9	15 September 1956	York City	A	0–2	9,835	
10	18 September 1956	Southport	A	1–1	3,256	Darwin
11	22 September 1956	Oldham Athletic	H	2–4	9,793	Mitten (2)
12	29 September 1956	Scunthorpe & Lindsey United	A	1–0	7,774	Jepson
13	6 October 1956	Halifax Town	H	2–0	9,039	Murray, Chapman
14	13 October 1956	Workington	A	3–3	7,159	Jepson (2), Chapman
15	20 October 1956	Derby County	H	1–2	16,357	Murray
16	27 October 1956	Barrow	A	0–2	5,689	
17	3 November 1956	Darlington	H	7–2	7,338	Chapman (3), Anderson, Murray (2), Darwin
18	10 November 1956	Bradford Park Avenue	A	4–1	6,456	Anderson, Murray, Mitten, Hindle (o.g.)
19	24 November 1956	Wrexham	A	0–0	10,562	
20	1 December 1956	Hull City	H	2–1	8,809	Jepson, Murray
21	8 December 1956	Gateshead	H	2–4	7,560	Chapman, Murray
22	15 December 1956	Stockport County	H	4–2	6,203	Murray, Mitten, Jepson, Watson
23	22 December 1956	Carlisle United	A	1–6	4,989	Darwin
24	25 December 1956	Chesterfield	A	0–1	11,107	
25	29 December 1956	Accrington Stanley	H	1–3	9,654	Chapman
26	5 January 1957	Chester	H	1–1	5,999	Glazzard
27	12 January 1957	Tranmere Rovers	A	1–3	5,033	Murray
28	19 January 1957	York City	H	4–1	6,931	Glazzard (2), Chapman (2)
29	26 January 1957	Chester	A	2–6	5,681	Chapman, Smith
30	2 February 1957	Oldham Athletic	A	1–1	6,929	Darwin
31	9 February 1957	Scunthorpe & Lindsey United	H	1–1	8,823	Glazzard
32	16 February 1957	Halifax Town	A	1–2	5,433	Mitten
33	2 March 1957	Derby County	A	0–4	22,997	
34	9 March 1957	Barrow	H	1–3	6,668	Uphill
35	16 March 1957	Darlington	A	3–1	5,566	Uphill, Mitten, Glazzard
36	23 March 1957	Bradford Park Avenue	H	2–1	7,621	Darwin, Glazzard
37	30 March 1957	Gateshead	A	1–1	3,471	Glazzard
38	6 April 1957	Wrexham	H	3–1	6,512	Darwin (3)
39	8 April 1957	Chesterfield	H	3–0	8,746	Uphill, Fox (2)
40	13 April 1957	Hull City	A	2–1	10,550	Uphill, Mitten
41	15 April 1957	Workington	H	2–2	11,364	Mitten (2)
42	19 April 1957	Hartlepools United	A	1–2	8,984	Glazzard
43	20 April 1957	Crewe Alexandra	H	2–1	7,748	Glazzard, Darwin
44	23 April 1957	Hartlepools United	H	4–1	10,963	Mitten, Darwin, Uphill (2)
45	27 April 1957	Crewe Alexandra	A	4–6	4,655	Morris (2), Darwin (2)
46	29 April 1957	Southport	H	1–2	6,788	Glazzard

=== FA Cup ===
Round	Date	Opponent	Venue	Result	Attendance	Scorers
R1	17 November 1956	Workington	H	1–1	11,383	Murray
R1 Replay	21 November 1956	Workington	A	1–2	9,070	Jepson

== Squad statistics ==
- Squad list sourced from 1956–57 Mansfield Town F.C. season at the English National Football Archive (subscription required)

Pos.	Name	League		FA Cup		Total	
Pos.	Name	Apps	Goals	Apps	Goals	Apps	Goals
GK	(Wales) Frank Elliot	36	0	2	0	38	0
GK	(England) Terry Statham	1	0	0	0	1	0
GK	(England) Dennis Wright	9	0	0	0	9	0
DF	(England) Don Bradley	23	0	2	0	25	0
DF	(England) Derek Chamberlain	24	0	0	0	24	0
DF	(England) Malcolm Flowers	3	0	0	0	3	0
DF	(England) Brian Lambert	12	0	2	0	14	0
DF	(England) Alan Rushby	12	0	0	0	12	0
DF	(England) Eric Ryan	1	0	0	0	1	0
DF	(England) Jim Stainton	6	0	2	0	8	0
DF	(England) Terry Swinscoe	5	0	0	0	5	0
DF	(England) Reg Warner	6	0	0	0	6	0
MF	(Northern Ireland) Sammy Chapman	21	10	2	0	23	10
MF	(England) Charlie Crowe	13	0	0	0	13	0
MF	(Northern Ireland) William Dickson	19	0	0	0	19	0
MF	(England) Oscar Fox	17	2	0	0	17	2
MF	(England) Brian Jayes	42	0	2	0	44	0
MF	(England) Sid Watson	41	1	2	0	43	1
FW	(England) Robbie Anderson	15	2	1	0	16	2
FW	(England) William Berry	10	1	0	0	10	1
FW	(England) George Darwin	35	19	1	0	36	19
FW	(England) Jimmy Glazzard	20	10	0	0	20	10
FW	(England) Barry Jepson	19	13	2	1	21	14
FW	(England) Charlie Mitten	45	11	2	0	47	11
FW	(England) Fred Morris	10	2	0	0	10	2
FW	(England) Ken Murray	25	9	2	1	27	10
FW	(England) Dave Smith	23	4	0	0	23	4
FW	(England) Dennis Uphill	13	6	0	0	13	6
–	Own goals	–	1	–	0	–	1
