= Holah =

Holah is a surname. Notable people with the surname include:

- Eric Holah (born 1937), English footballer
- Marty Holah (born 1976), New Zealand rugby union player
