= 5:30 Saturday Morning =

Studio album by Lennon
- Released: September 11, 2001
- Studio: Colorado Music House
- Genres: Nu metal; rock
- Length: 47:08
- Label: Arista
- Producers: Jeffrey Pringle; Scotty Smith; Marcus Siskind; Spider; Lennon

Lennon chronology
5:30 Saturday Morning (2001)	Career Suicide (2003)

Singles from 5:30 Saturday Morning
- 1. "Brake of Your Car" Released: 2001

5:30 Saturday Morning is the debut studio album by American singer-songwriter Lennon. It was released on September 11, 2001, by Arista Records. Lennon, who signed to Arista at eighteen and was nineteen at the time of its release, wrote or co-wrote all twelve songs on the record, in addition to performing piano for some of the tracks. The album's compositions and production were generally classified as rock or metal, although they were also noted for incorporating elements of pop-rock and trip-hop, while its lyrics were noted for their anger and defiance. The album's musical style also inspired comparisons to Alanis Morissette, Korn, Kid Rock, and others.

To promote the album, Lennon embarked on a set of tour dates with the Cult. In advance of the album's release, she also received favorable write-ups in publications including Rolling Stone and Entertainment Weekly. Upon its release, the album drew polarized reviews from music critics. Some praised the record for her songwriting, mixture of different styles, and contrast with other teen pop singers of the time, while others criticized the production as nondescript. The album gained traction on college radio stations and at some independent music sellers, while its lead single, "Brake of Your Car", received favorable reviews and went into rotation on MuchMusic USA.

== Background ==
Lennon grew up in Tennessee and performed her first show — lasting three hours — at age 15. Her mother, also an aspiring songwriter, acted as her manager, and connected her daughter to musicians in the Nashville area. Shortly after Lennon's eighteenth birthday, her mother died from an allergic reaction and Lennon entered a custody dispute over her then-eight-year-old sister. She also signed to Arista Records, which helped her to prevail in the custody battle. Lennon wrote or co-wrote all twelve tracks on the album, as well as performing piano on some of the songs.

== Composition ==
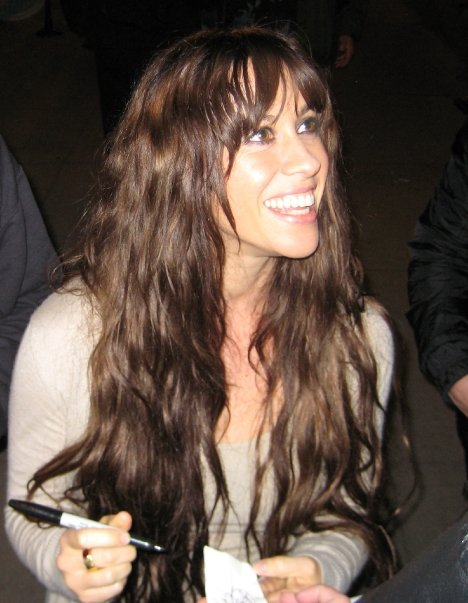
Several of the songs’ emotional lyrics inspired comparisons to the early work of Canadian rock singer Alanis Morissette

The album was noted for its contrast with teen pop singers of the time such as Britney Spears. The album was also compared to the work of Fiona Apple, Alanis Morissette, and Y Kant Tori Read. Opening track "Property of Goatf**er" was compared to the style of Rob Zombie, as well as that of Kid Rock's "Bawitdaba". The song includes the lyric "I don't care what people have to say", a recurring theme on the album. "Brake of Your Car", which contains "sinister organs and trippy voice-overs" as well as "driving guitars", has been described as an anthem. "My Beautiful", also known as "Where Do I Fit In", prominently features its string arrangement as well as "grandiose metal production". The first minute of "Couldn't Breathe" features a "tornado" effect of "swirling electronica and chugging metal guitars" before transitioning into an "elegiac" style with piano accompaniment. The track drew stylistic comparisons to Rage Against the Machine (for its guitar riffs) and Sarah McLachlan (for its trip-hop influence), and features an acoustic guitar-driven bridge. "Those Days" was compared to Alanis Morissette's "You Oughta Know" with "Korn-fed production". The title track and "Asking You" are piano-centered torch songs that critic Christa Titus suggested could also appeal to fans of mainstream teen pop.

== Singles and promotion ==
"Brake of Your Car" was released as the record's lead single prior to the album's release, and was sent to radio stations in late October. It gained traction, in particular, on college radio stations. The single was promoted with an accompanying music video, which went into rotation on MuchMusic USA (since renamed Fuse) in September. In 2006, Lennon would re-record album cut "My Beautiful" as an uptempo rock song and release the new recording as a single under the title "Where Do I Fit In?"

Months prior to the album's release, Lennon was featured in the 2001 "Hot Issue" of Rolling Stone as well as the "New Faces" feature in Entertainment Weekly. In the former, she was praised as having "a penchant for bawdy lyrics and dark metal riffs". The album was also featured in the Autumn 2001 issue of ELLEgirl, as one of twelve records which three teen girls discussed; readers could also enter to win a copy of the album. Lennon toured as an opening act for the Cult during the West Coast portion of their 2001 tour, and was slated to later headline some dates herself. Billboard quoted the manager of an independent record store in San Francisco who said that the record's sales had "been slowly, but steadily, building" in interest, and forecast that "This is the kind of record that will still be selling a year from now, after the big records have crashed and burned."

== Reception ==
=== Commercial ===
The record found a following on college radio stations, where it went into steady rotation. In the CMJ New Music Report dated October 29, 2001, after four weeks on the chart, the album placed at number 82 on the CMJ Radio 200, based on the playlists of 462 American college radio stations.

=== Critical ===
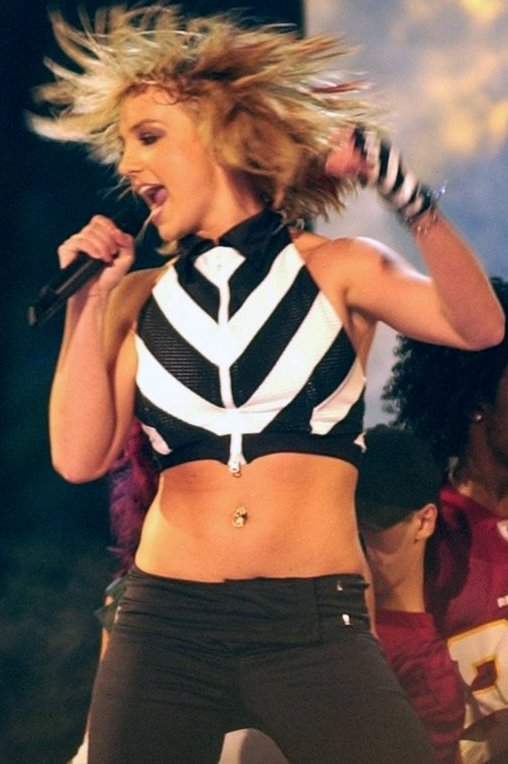
Several critics noted that the record differed markedly from the work of Lennon's teen pop contemporaries, such as Britney Spears.

In a review for the issue of Billboard dated September 15, 2001, contributor Christa Titus awarded the album the "critic's choice" designation, commending Lennon for "taking more musical chances on her debut than some seasoned artists have in their entire careers" and singling out "My Beautiful" as a standout track. MTV music critic Kurt Loder also favorably assessed the record, writing that it was "Refreshing to come across a teenage performer who isn't blonde, writes her own songs, plays an instrument, and kicks ass". Independent outlet Musical Discoveries commended the album's stylistic range and called it "one of the best albums by an emerging artist we've heard this year".

Other critics were less favorable in their assessments. Stephen Thomas Erlewine, writing for AllMusic, designated it as an "Album Pick" from her discography, but also called it a "frankly bewildering blend of bad nu-metal and singer/songwriter soul-baring". Erlewine argued that "when she turns on attitude... it's unconvincing" and that some of the album's emotional moments "get too heavy with sentiment and sediment". However, Erlewine singled out "Brake of Your Car" as a highlight of the album, calling it "a surging number with an undeniable hook" that showed Lennon's potential. A review for The A.V. Club, penned by Noel Murray, called Lennon's voice "nondescript", her songwriting "merely adequate", and her use of different musical styles "opportunistic and inorganic". He concluded that the album is "a blatant Frankenstein job, a cynical pastiche of teen-sex-toy posturing, Tori Amos-style victim-becomes-perpetrator harangues, and the most generic of grinding techno-metal." Lorne Behrman, writing for the November–December 2001 issue of CMJ New Music Monthly, accused the album of sounding like a "blatant" attempt to simultaneously capitalize on the popularity of Britney Spears and nu metal. He did, however, praise the title track and the latter part of "Couldn't Breathe" as seeming intimate and authentic. A review printed in indie music publication Ink19 accused Lennon of seeming "fake" with her "badness" and warned that her image might alienate potential female fans.

==== Accolades ====
In the year-end issue of Billboard in 2001, Titus ranked the album cut "My Beautiful" at number four on her list of the year's "Top 5 Songs Never Heard on the Radio".

== Track listing ==
All tracks produced by Jeffrey Pringle and Scotty Smith; additional production credits noted.

1. "Property of Goatfucker" – 3:30
2. "Trying To Make Me" – 4:27
3. "Brake of Your Car" – 4:02 (additional production by Marcus Siskind)
4. "My Beautiful" – 5:12
5. "Those Days" – 3:03
6. "Asking You" – 4:51 (additional production by Spider)
7. "Morning" – 4:35
8. "I Hear" – 3:26
9. "Thank You" – 3:40
10. "Couldn't Breathe" – 4:11
11. "These Days" – 4:17
12. "5:30 Saturday Morning" – 3:45 (additional production by Lennon)

== Credits ==
Adapted from Musical Discoveries

- Lennon Murphy — vocals, piano
- Scotty Smith — guitar
- Eli McFadden — guitar
- Spider — guitar
- Kenny Aronoff — drums
- Jerry Flowers — bass
- Scott Borland — bass
