= Simon Devitt =

Australian theoretical quantum physicist

Simon Devitt FRSN FAIP
- Born: Simon John Devitt; 17 July 1981 (age 45); Adelaide, South Australia, Australia
- Education: University of Melbourne; Cambridge University
- Known for: Quantum Computing; Quantum network; Quantum programming
- Scientific career
- Fields: Physicist
- Workplaces: University of Technology, Sydney; Macquarie University; Riken; Ochanomizu University; National Institute of Informatics
- Thesis: Quantum information engineering: concepts to quantum technologies
- Doctoral advisor: Lloyd CL Hollenberg

Simon John Devitt FRSN FAIP (born 17 July 1981) is an Australian theoretical quantum physicist who has worked on large-scale Quantum computing architectures, Quantum network systems design, Quantum programming development and Quantum error correction. In 2022 he was appointed as a member to Australia's National Quantum Advisory Committee.

== Education ==
Devitt received his BSc (Hons) in Physics from Melbourne University in 2004. He completed his PhD in physics under Lloyd Hollenberg at the Center for Quantum Computation (CQCT) at the University of Melbourne in 2008, with a thesis entitled Quantum information engineering: concepts to quantum technologies. During his Ph.D, Devitt was awarded the Rae and Edith Bennett Travelling Scholarship at the Faculty of Mathematics, University of Cambridge, where he worked within the Centre for Quantum Computation, headed by Artur Ekert.

== Career and research ==
Following his PhD, Devitt did postdoctoral research at the Japanese National Institute of Informatics in the group of Kae Nemoto, where he was promoted to assistant professor in 2011. Later, in 2014, he took a position of associate professor in physics at Ochanomizu University at the Leading Graduate School Promotion Center. In 2015 he took up a position as senior research scientist at the Japanese National Laboratories, Riken, in the Superconducting Quantum Simulation Research Team, headed by Jaw-Shen Tsai.

In 2017, he returned to Australia where he was appointed research fellow for the Australian Research Council Center of Excellence for Engineered Quantum Systems (EQUS) at Macquarie University and in 2018 he was appointed as lecturer in quantum architectures at the Center for Quantum Software and Information (QSI) at the University of Technology Sydney. In 2020 he was awarded the inaugural Warren prize by the Royal Society of New South Wales for his service to quantum computing development and in 2021 he was elected fellow of the Royal Society of New South Wales and the Australian Institute of Physics. In 2022 Devitt was appointed associate professor and research director of the Center for quantum software and information at UTS.

Devitt's research has focused on the design of practical large-scale systems architectures for quantum computing and communications system. He published the first architecture, in an atom-optical system, that utilised techniques in topological quantum error correction that could be conceptually scaled to an arbitrary number of encoded qubits. In 2014, in collaboration with NTT Communications and TU Wien, he developed a design for a scalable system using the Nitrogen-vacancy center and in 2017 he developed a large-scale system design for Ion trap quantum computing in collaboration with the University of Sussex. Devitt has also worked in the development of scalable Quantum networks, developing designs for what is now known as 2nd and 3rd generation quantum repeaters and inventing, with scientists in Japan and Australia, a quantum version of Sneakernets.

Devitt's recent work has focused largely on developing a software framework for large-scale, error-corrected machines, including methods to map high-level quantum circuits to machine level instructions and how these error-corrected circuits need to be optimised to reduce the resource load on quantum computing hardware.

In 2016, he established, with Jared Cole of RMIT University, the first consultancy specialising in quantum technology, which became a founding member of the Spanish based industry group, the Quantum World Association (QWA).

He has worked with and advised several companies and government agencies worldwide on quantum technology development, is regularly featured in the popular press, and comments for outlets such as New Scientist and MIT Technology Review on developments in quantum technology research.

In 2016, Devitt created and hosts the Meet the meQuanics podcast, where scientists, industry leaders and students discuss issues related to the new quantum technology sector.

== Selected publications ==
20 June 2013 Devitt, S. J; Munro, W. J; Nemoto, K (2013). "Quantum error correction for beginners". Reports on Progress in Physics. 76 (7) 076001. arXiv:0905.2794. Bibcode:2013RPPh...76g6001D. doi:10.1088/0034-4885/76/7/076001. PMID 23787909. S2CID 206021660..

20 June 2016 Van Meter, R; Devitt, S.J (2016). "The path to scalable distributed quantum computing". Computer. 49 (9): 31–42. arXiv:1605.06951. doi:10.1109/MC.2016.291. S2CID 118421039..

20 September 2016 Devitt, S. J (2016). "Programming quantum computers using 3-D puzzles, coffee cups, and doughnuts". XRDS: Crossroads, the ACM Magazine for Students. 23 (1): 45–50. arXiv:1609.06628. Bibcode:2016arXiv160906628D. doi:10.1145/2983545. S2CID 12377031..

1 February 2017 Lekitsch, B; Weidt, S; Fowler, A. G; Molmer, K; Devitt, S. J; Wunderlich, C; Hensinger, W (2017). "Blueprint for a microwave trapped ion quantum computer". Science Advances. 3 (2) e1601540. arXiv:1609.06628. Bibcode:2017SciA....3E1540L. doi:10.1126/sciadv.1601540. PMC 5287699. PMID 28164154..

7 December 2012 Horsman, C; Fowler, A. G; Devitt, S. J; Van Meter, R (2012). "Surface code quantum computing by lattice surgery". New J. Phys. 14 (12) 123011. arXiv:1111.4022. Bibcode:2012NJPh...14l3011H. doi:10.1088/1367-2630/14/12/123011. S2CID 119212756..
