= Lennon Murphy =

American singer (born 1982)

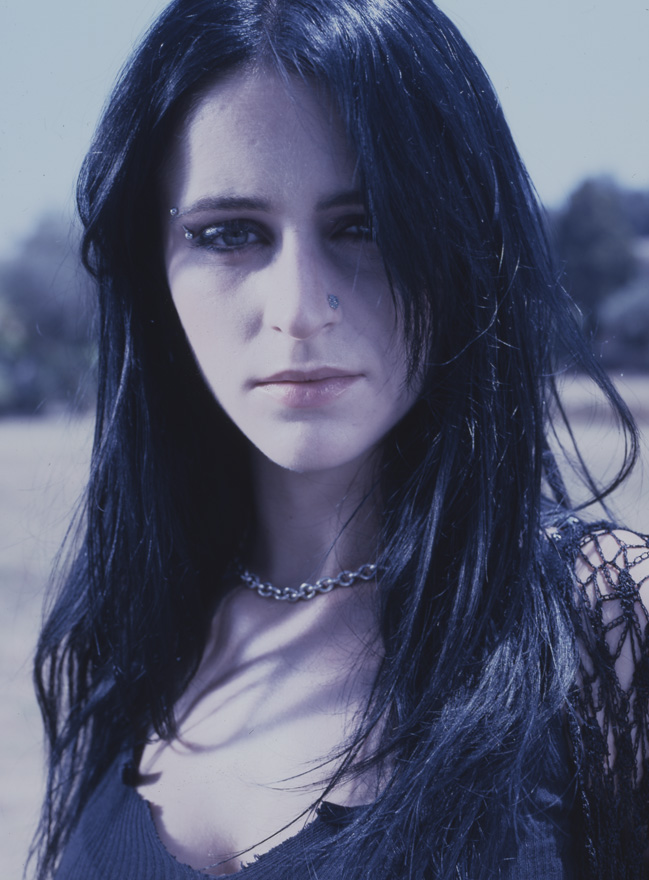

Background information
- Also known as: Lennon
- Born: Lennon Anne Murphy; March 31, 1982 (age 44); Ronkonkoma, New York, U.S.
- Origin: Hendersonville, Tennessee, U.S.
- Genres: Nu metal; heavy metal; hard rock; acoustic rock; pop
- Occupations: Singer, songwriter, record producer
- Years active: 2001–present
- Labels: Arista; RCA; Universal; Columbia

Lennon Anne Murphy, known mononymously as Lennon, (born March 31, 1982) is an American singer, songwriter, and record producer.

== Early life ==
Murphy, who is named after musician John Lennon, was born in Ronkonkoma, New York. When she was four years old, Murphy and her mother moved to Hendersonville, Tennessee, where she began playing piano and writing songs at the age of nine. At the age of 15, Lennon started performing shows at various local Nashville establishments. With much critical acclaim from the Nashville music community came interest from several record companies. Lennon ultimately signed to Arista Records at the age of 18.

Within days of her 18th birthday, Murphy arrived home from school to find her mother dead. The cause of death was determined to be an allergic reaction to prescription medication. Murphy fought for and eventually won custody of her then eight-year-old younger sister, Mariella.

== Career ==
Known in music by only her first name, she released her debut album, 5:30 Saturday Morning, from Arista records, on September 11, 2001. Her only single from that album was a song called "Brake of your Car". Soured by the experience, she left Arista, saying "I wanted a career as a rock act, and an album I could be proud of, and staying with Arista I really didn't see that happening,".

In 2002, Murphy released Goodbye, an advanced copy of the yet-to-be-released album I Am with 11 of the 13 tracks on I Am. The following year in 2003, she released a strictly acoustic album entitled Career Suicide. It is a collection of the original piano versions of songs from 5:30 Saturday Morning with some unreleased tracks as well. Almost all of Murphy's songs were written on piano first, and then later fleshed out into rock versions with her full band, so this album gave fans a glimpse into the more raw, emotional versions of her songs and was well received despite the album name.

On December 22, 2004, she released another album entitled I Am in Japan through Columbia Records. It debuted a remade version of her song My Beautiful featuring Travis Meeks from the band Days Of The New. A two-disc version was also released in Portugal on the label Different Star. While the cover art was different, disc one was identical to the Japanese version. Disc two, labeled as a "bonus acoustic album", contained all of the tracks from the aforementioned Career Suicide.

She also released a DVD entitled My Crazy Life.

In 2005 Immergent Records released a CD/DVD Dualdisc in their "Live Music Series" titled Beyond Warped. The CD side contained 6 studio tracks and 2 live tracks from her Vans Warped Tour performance. The DVD side side contained two interviews, fan-shot footage, three live performance videos, and "bonus studio tracks"

On September 5, 2006, Murphy kicked off a tour opening for Aerosmith and Mötley Crüe to promote the September 19, 2006, release of her album Damaged Goods. The lead single is the track Where Do I Fit In?, which is a revamp of the track My Beautiful from her Arista debut.

In 2007, Lennon started a metal project called "Devil's Gift". Their self-titled album was produced by Jason Suecof (Trivium, DevilDriver, Chimaira). The album was released in Europe in 2008 by Tiefdruck-Musik and independently (no label) in the US on October 6, 2009

2009 also saw the release of Just One, with a mix of new songs as well as some from previous albums.

In 2010, Lennon took her first step as a record producer with work on the debut record for Camryn, a 10-year-old pop act from Colorado, whose songs made up the sound track for the film Judy Moody and the Not Bummer Summer. Lennon also produced the debut album for Baccardi recording artist Surrender the Fall.

In 2014, Lennon helped create the band "It's War". Their 1st single "Heart" was released in February 2014. The five-track EP, including "Heart," dropped on iTunes, Amazon and Google Play Music on May 26, 2015.

== Personal life ==
Murphy resides in Orlando, Florida. She has a son (Adrien) and a dog (Mulder).

== Trademark dispute with Yoko Ono ==
On February 12, 2008, Yoko Ono filed a complaint against Murphy's use of her own first name. Murphy reported on her own MySpace page that she is being sued by Ono to cease use of the "Lennon" name. The news turned up because Julian Lennon picked up a letter from Murphy and published it. Murphy wrote on Feb. 8: "Yesterday I received notice that Yoko Ono had filed a lawsuit against me, asking for a cancellation of the trademark that I own for the name 'Lennon.' This could very well mean the career that I have worked so hard at, the one you all have believed in, may come to an end. I wanted to address the situation to all my fans because without you I am nothing and it's not fair to everyone who has believed in my music not to be properly informed of this pure bullshit." Murphy says in her letter that in 2003, her Arista product manager was Justin Shukat, the son of Ono's longtime attorney Peter Shukat.

Murphy says Justin went to his father and Ono "to make her aware of the use, evidently giving her blessing as Arista proceeded forward with the album release and at the same time filing for the trademark. Its [sic] takes time for all of the legal work to go through, but finally in 2003 I was granted by the United States Patent & Trademark Office the ownership in the name Lennon for musical use."

"Eight long, hard years pass and no one says a word. Just two days before the statute of limitations was up this very same lawyer we went to in 2000 filed their complaint. It accuses me of falsely representing myself and causing confusion in the market place that has damaged ... the John Lennon name."

According to Yoko Ono, Lennon Murphy sought Ono's permission to do her performances under her name. Ono did not object to her request. Subsequently, without Ono's knowledge, Murphy filed an application in the United States Patent & Trademark Office requesting the exclusive right to utilize the name "Lennon" for musical performances. Ono's attorneys asked Murphy's attorneys and manager to withdraw her registration of exclusivity to the name "Lennon" for the trademark. Ono also offered to cover all costs incurred in filing for the trademark, but Murphy went ahead to register.

In 2008, Ono stated she did not sue Murphy, but sought to stop her from getting the exclusive right to the name Lennon for performance purposes. Ono's attorneys notified the Trademark office that Ono did not believe it was fair that Murphy be granted the exclusive right to the "Lennon" trademark in relation to musical and entertainment services.

On September 23, 2008, after months of legal battle, Yoko Ono lost to Lennon Murphy after the United States Trademark Board dismissed Ono's petition.

== Discography ==
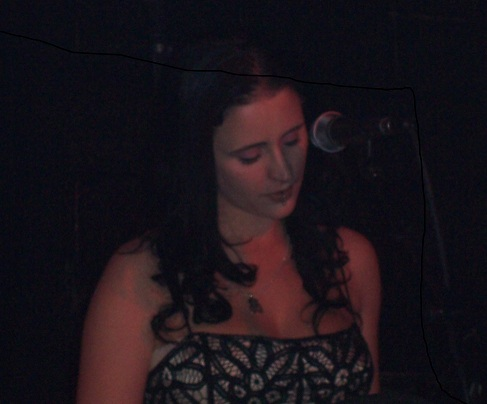
Murphy performing in 2006

=== As singer/writer ===
Artist	Album	Label	Year
Lennon	5:30 Saturday Morning	Arista	2001
Lennon	Career Suicide	John Galt Entertainment	2004
Lennon	I Am	Columbia Music	2004
Lennon	Damaged Goods	John Galt Entertainment	2006
Lennon	Beyond Warped	Aloha Films	2008
Lennon	Where Do I Fit In: Remixes	John Galt Entertainment	2008
Lennon	Just One	John Galt Entertainment	2009
Devils Gift	Devils Gift	Universal	2009
It's War	Heart (Single)	Epicly Dumb	2014
It's War	EP	Epicly Dumb	2015

=== As producer/writer ===
P/W	Artist	Album	Label	Year
W	Skip The Foreplay	Nightlife	Epitaph	2010
P/W	Camryn	Wait & See (Single)	5280 Media	2010
P/W	Camryn	Summer (Single)	5280 Media	2011
P/W	Camryn	Set The Night On Fire (Single)	5280 Media	2011
P/W	Camryn	Now Or Never (Single)	5280 Media	2012
P/W	Surrender The Fall	Burn In The Spotlight	Rum Bum	2012
P/W	Camryn	Lovesick (Single)	5280 Media	2013
W	Now And On Earth	TBA	Epitaph	2015
