= Scotty Smith =

South African bandit known as South Africa's Robin Hood

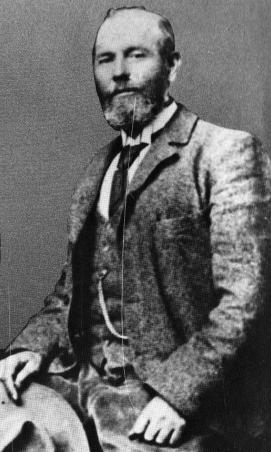
- Scotty Smith c.1902
- Born: George St Leger Gordon Lennox; 1846
- Died: December 1919 (aged 72–73); Upington
- Resting place: Upington cemetery
- Other names: Scotty Smith, Douglas MacDonald
- Occupation: Professional criminal
- Criminal charge: Armed robbery
- Criminal penalty: Four years imprisonment and 25 lashes

George St Leger Lennox (1845 – December 1919) born into a noble Scottish family, popularly known as Scotty Smith, was a South African bandit known as South Africa's Robin Hood. He was well known as a cattle thief, lover (and thief) of horses, dealer in illegal diamonds, smuggler and friend of the poor.

== Early life ==
A book was written by F. C. Metrowich, Scotty Smith, which was published in 1962 and went through at least three editions. By Scotty's own account, according to Metrowich, he was not willing to marry the girl that his father had chosen for him in Scotland, and therefore did not receive his inheritance. George, or Scotty as he was often called, trained as a veterinarian, before being shipped to the colonies. It is thought that he first went to Australia where it is believed he participated in the Kalgoorlie gold rush. Apparently he did not have much success though, because he it also rumored to have ended up first as a prize fighter in New York, and later as Veterinary Officer of an Army regiment in India. Scotty got this post on recommendation of an uncle who was Commander in Chief of the Indian Army. The officer in charge of his cavalry squadron was killed in one of the Hill campaigns, so Scotty is believed to have taken over, ordered to charge and caused heavy casualties for his troops. After a court martial, he was believed to have been discharged.

== South Africa ==
Scotty arrived in South Africa in 1877 to join the Frontier Armed and Mounted Police. He saw action in the Gaika War. It is not known exactly when his military career ended, or when he got his nickname "Scotty Smith", although he claimed that he took the papers of a fallen comrade by that name. Due to lack of more evidence, it is concluded that he may have used stolen papers in the name of "Scotty Smith" to escape military life at some point, but there is no actual proof of this. After his early attempts at a military lifestyle, both in Australia and in South Africa, Scotty's life took a more exciting turn.

== Stories ==
When in South Africa he got involved in gun-running, general theft, elephant hunting and other hunting activities in the then Bechuanaland (Botswana). He was also involved in legal and illegal diamond buying in the diamond fields, horse theft and highway robberies. He was caught and sentenced several times for these crimes, but always managed to escape somehow and claimed that no prison cell could hold him. It appears that a lot of these activities were on behalf of the British government and he was released without blowing his cover.

Scotty Smith was a genius when it came to fooling people into believing that he was someone else by changing his character, as it was never claimed that he actually used a disguise. It is said that one police detective who had arrested Scotty, ended up being the captive, and "Sergeant Scotty" handed him over to the police in Kimberley, claiming that the captive (who was the policeman) was Scotty Smith. After being jailed, the man had a difficult time in convincing the authorities that Scotty Smith had played a trick on them.

Many times, living up to his nickname of Robin Hood of the Kalahari, he robbed the rich to give to the poor. There is a story about a farmer or boer who once met Scotty but did not recognise him. The farmer related to this man (Scotty) that he would like to capture Scotty Smith and claim the large reward at the Kenhard police station. Scotty then immediately identified himself and told the now hesitant farmer to take him to Kenhardt Police station at gunpoint, where the reluctant farmer received the reward. However, the farmer did not have to feel remorse for very long, because early that evening, Scotty broke out of jail and rode off again. It is thought that he would have been released by the authorities

Another story about Scotty Smith claims that he calmly hid the illegal diamonds that he had smuggled, which the police came looking for, in the kettle which was simmering on the camp-fire. He then apparently went ahead and poured coffee for the policemen and himself from the boiling kettle. There is evidence that he acted for the British during the various wars in South Africa as an intelligence field officer providing both information about opposition troop movements in the Kalahari and providing provisions. He arranged horses, fodder and the like to the British troops

== Languages ==
Besides English and probably Lowland Scots or Scots Gaelic, Scotty was fluent in German, Afrikaans and an unknown number of Bushmen languages, and possibly also in a few of the other native Southern African languages. Yet another story told about him is that when an unexpected police patrol paid him a visit, he would ask to be allowed to hold "huisgodsdiens" (Afrikaans for home religious service) for his servants. He conducted these services in Bushmen language, and in full view of the policemen, who could not understand a word, he gave detailed instructions to his servants on how to hide anything that he did not want the policemen to see or find. It is said that the policemen never suspected a thing.

== Jail ==
In 1892 Scotty Smith met 19-year-old Miss Susara Magdelina van Niekerk and married. Together they raised a family of two sons and five daughters.

After a short time in the Military Scotty left his family. After a long career involved in horse and cattle stealing, he was involved in numerous illegal diamond operations again in the wider Kimberley area. In most of the stories about him, Scotty is victorious against all odds and always get away with it. Although there is a story that took place at a little place near Kimberley, in the Boshof district, named Olifantsfontein where one of Scotty's plans went wrong.

A merchant, Thomas Welford and his partner Gustav Herman and Gustav's brother Max, approached Scotty Smith to help them steal a packet of diamonds from Sam Kemp (a supposed diamond merchant) but who was apparently an illegal runner for a man known as Sam Weil. The plan was as follows; the group would ambush Sam Kemp and steal the diamonds. If he resisted, they would shoot him.

The plan was carried out, Sam Kemp resisted and was shot and the diamonds were stolen. Kemp recovered though, and rode back to Kimberley to report the theft at the police station. Police officers soon uncovered the whole plan and arrested Scotty and the others. This time, for once, Scotty did not attempt escape. He was sentenced to four years imprisonment and 25 lashes in the Boshof circuit court. He never received the lashes though and after a year, his sentence was dropped and he was once again free.

It is a pity that a man of your appearance should deal in stolen property. There is no excuse for you; it is a gross crime. The boundary line is getting dangerous for our people. It is quite an accident that Kemp was not killed. I took you for a man who knew better. I will punish you severely.

— Chief Justice Reitz addressing Scotty Smith during the trial,

During his imprisonment in Bloemfontein, it is claimed that Scotty Smith was permitted to visit the town bar daily. One day, he apparently came across a parade including the Official State President's coach, after successfully masquerading as the president, he took a ride in high style, before returning to prison later on. Again, it is not known how accurate these stories are.

After his year in jail, Scotty left for a more rural area, and from the early 1880s he was a bandit in the area of the Goshen and Stellaland Republics. He stayed in that area until shortly before the Anglo-Boer War.

Amongst the strange things Scotty did was a trek of several months by ox-wagon, accompanied by Dorothea Bleek (niece of Lucy Lloyd), to enable her to study Bushmen languages in the Kalahari.

== Bushmen skeletons ==
The story of the Bushmen skeletons is unusual and suspicious. It started with a visit from Dr. Borcherds of Upington, to London. Dr. Borcherds noticed that the Bushmen skeletons in the Royal College of Surgeons were not of good quality, so he authorized Scotty to find better specimens. Shortly after that Scotty arrived at the doctor's house with 10 complete skeletons. He claimed that the skeletons belonged to Bushmen who had previously raided his farm and who he had shot and buried.

Scotty ended up supplying hundreds of Bushmen skeletons to many European museums. There were rumours that Scotty had deliberately killed these Bushmen, but this has never been proven.

== Death ==
Scotty died a respected elderly townsman of Upington during the 1919 flu epidemic. He is buried in the Upington cemetery. The grave is protected by an iron trellis, on his grave stone is written "Never will his memory fade – Jessie".

Shortly after his death in 1919 the late Dr. Homer L. Shantz, botanist, professor, and president of the University of Arizona visited the home of Scotty Smith. A photo is held in the University of Arizona Shantz collections.
