= Surrender the Fall =

American rock band

Surrender the Fall is an American rock band formed in Memphis, Tennessee, in 2005. In 2014, the band was signed to Rum Bum Records.

== History ==
Surrender the Fall was formed after guitarist Eddie Tyre, a lifelong resident of New Orleans, lost everything in Hurricane Katrina and co-guitarist Anthony Pitts gave up football because of a knee injury. Jared Cole's vocals and Devin Hightower on bass completed the group. Their debut album "Burn In The Spotlight" was released in 2012.

The band has toured with Nonpoint, My Darkest Days, All That Remains, Eye Empire and has played in many venues around the United States. The band has received coverage in national outlets, including Revolver Magazine, and Billboard Magazine. Hails and Horns, AOL, Flint Journal, Toledo Free Press.

Surrender the Fall signed with Rum Bum Records after a showcase at the Official Lollapalooza After Party at the Hard Rock. Their first album, Burn in the Spotlight, was twelve hard rock songs. The album received generally favorable reviews. The song "Love, Hate, Masquerade" was included in Billboard's Top 50 Active Rock chart.

By January 2013, Surrender the Fall's single "Some Kind of Perfect" had hit #40 on the Active Rock radio charts. Later that year the band released a video to accompany the track.

== Band members ==
- Jared Cole – vocals
- Eddie Tyre – guitar
- Anthony Pitts – guitar
- Devin Hightower – bass

== Former members ==
- Zack Horvath – Drums
