= Bridlington Town A.F.C. =

Association football club in England

Coordinates: 54°5′20.969″N 0°11′50.280″W

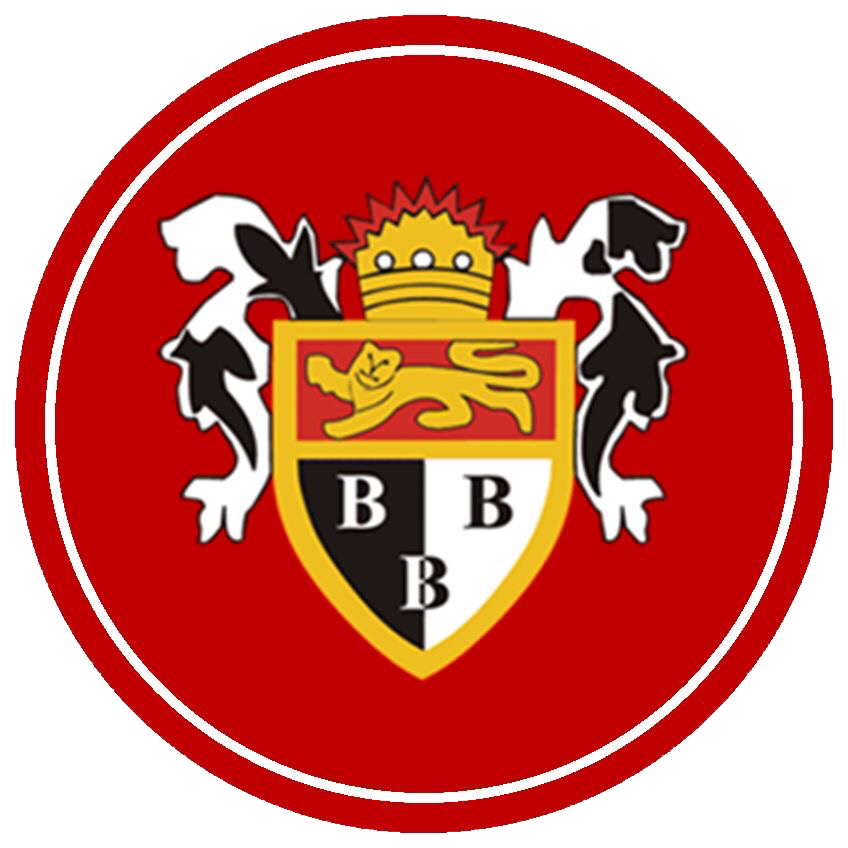
- Full name: Bridlington Town Association Football Club
- Nicknames: The Seasiders; Brid
- Founded: 1918 as Bridlington Central United (reformed as Bridlington Town 1920)
- Ground: Queensgate, Bridlington
- Capacity: 3,000 (740 seated)
- Chairman: Daniel Rogers
- Manager: Scott Kerr
- League: Northern Premier League Division One East
- 2025–26: Northern Premier League Division One East, 8th of 22
| Home colours | Away colours |

Bridlington Town Association Football Club is an association football club based in Bridlington, East Riding of Yorkshire, England. They were founded in 1918 and currently play in the Northern Premier League Division One East.

== History ==
The club was founded in 1918 as Bridlington Central United after the First World War. The team joined the Driffield and District Minor League, soon joining the Driffield and District League. After several seasons of hard work, the team were promoted into the East Riding Amateur League, they won the championship five consecutive times during the 1950s. They also won the East Riding Senior Cup twice around this time.

=== Yorkshire League ===
The club changed their name to Bridlington Town F.C. in 1920 and moved into the Yorkshire League Division Two, during their first season in that league, they finished runners up and were promoted. In 1960–61 they reached the First Round proper of the FA Cup eventually losing out to Bishop Auckland who were very strong at the time.

In the mid to late 1960s, Town built up a rivalry with fellow Bridlington side Bridlington Trinity. During the 1966–67 season in the Yorkshire League, Town won the championship while Trinity finished second. The following year it would be Trinity who took the title and Town finished in third. This rivalry continued until the early 1970s when Trinity became part of the Midland League.

=== Northern Counties East League ===
In 1982, the club were one of the founder members of the Northern Counties East League after the Yorkshire and Midland Leagues were merged. They were put into Northern Counties East League Division One, here they stayed for four seasons.

By 1986–87, they were promoted to the Northern Counties East League Premier Division, even though they only finished sixth. This was because several teams in the Premier Division had resigned in the close season. This gave Town the opportunity to ignite their old rivalry with Bridlington Trinity, for the first time since the early 1970s.

During the first three seasons in the Premier Division, Town finished higher. With a third and a fourth place, while Trinity were in the bottom half. The 1989–90 season was the concluding showdown for the two clubs. Town were crowned champions, while Trinity ended the season a respectable fourth. This would prove to be the end of the rivalry as Trinity folded due to the termination of their groundshare with Bridlington Town. Unfortunately for Bridlington, they were unable to put the icing on the cake in their FA Vase final clash at Wembley with Yeading, they drew the game, but lost in the replay 1–0 at Elland Road.

=== Cup and League success, before folding ===
Ken Richardson had joined the club as president and was essential in helping the club with the necessary finance to develop their ground, in order to climb the football ladder. They added a new stand, clubhouse, turnstiles and floodlights.

Town marched on to the Northern Premier League Division One. The 1992–93 season was the most successful in the club's history, they finished as champions of the NPL Division One, and they finally took the FA Vase at Wembley, beating Tiverton Town 1–0. Alan Radford scored the only goal of the game.

The sunny spell would not last. Due to legalities, the team was forced to play their home games at Doncaster Rovers' ground; Belle Vue. The club went into turmoil. They finished 21st in the Northern Premier League Premier Division and were deducted three points. Instead of going into Northern Premier League Division One, they folded.

=== Return ===
A local pub team The Greyhound, approached the lease-holders of Bridlington Town's former stadium Queensgate, looking for it to become their base. A deal was struck under the condition that the team would change their name to Bridlington Town AFC, essentially bringing the old club back to the town.

The Greyhound club agreed and a new club crest was designed and a new motto "Pergere et Eniti", which means "Onwards and Upwards". The club returned on 10 September 1994, and were put into the league where they had originally played during their formative years; the Driffield and District League, it was literally back to square one.

Bridlington progressed steadily, gaining entry to the East Riding County League Division One, they won the league and cup double. After three seasons in the East Riding County League Premier Division, Town finished runners-up and applied for promotion back into the Northern Counties East League Division One. They were accepted and spent three seasons at this level; finishing fifth, and then fourth, before achieving promotion with a runners-up spot in 2001–02.

Town made their mark in 2002–03, reaching the quarter-final of the FA Vase before going out to Brigg Town. And they also reached the Fourth Qualifying Round of the FA Cup, eventually losing to Conference National side Southport. Bridlington Town won the league that year, they were crowned champions with 20 points ahead of the runners-up.

=== Recent times ===
The club was back in the Northern Premier League Division One. Bridlington Town finished 11th but was promoted back into the Northern Premier League Premier Division after the league was reorganised. 10 years after they were forced to start again, the club had ranked at the highest division they had been in. It took the original club 85 years to reach that level.

In 2007, it was announced that Bridlington Town would play in the inaugural season of the Northern Premier League Division One North. However, a campaign resulted in them finishing last of the division and were relegated to the Northern Counties East League Premier Division. In 2012, The Seasiders won the East Riding Senior Cup, beating Hall Road Rangers (res) 9–2 in the final at the KC Stadium. They won the cup again in 2015, beating Hull United F.C. 4–2.

Steady Progression saw the club join the East Riding County League Division One, where the League and Cup Double was achieved. Over the next three seasons in the County Premier Division, the club made applications to the Northern Counties East League. It was on the third application that Bridlington Town was accepted, having finished runners-up in the league and beat the league champions in the league cup final of 1998–99 under manager John Bowman. On 25 December 2000, the club had downgraded to mid-table. Bowman was replaced by Billy Heath, and the club ranked in fourth place.

Towns' third season back in the NCEL saw an 18-game unbeaten run lift. Town to finish Division One Runners Up and gained promotion to the Premier Division. The 2002–03 season started with 14 straight wins in all competitions. Town also reached the fourth Qualifying round of the FA Cup, losing away at Conference side Southport, and the quarterfinal of the Vase, losing away at League rivals and eventual Vase winners Brigg Town. Town lost only one of the last 26 games and the club finished as champions with a 20-point winning margin, advancing to the Unibond League for 2003–04.

Winter postponements and the cup success saw Town playing three games each week through March and April. To ensure promotion, Gary Wilkinson of Wilkinson Caravans, the main sponsor, secured the purchase of Bridlington Town AFC Ltd. from the former owners, thus ensuring the future of the club. The season in the Unibond Division One saw injuries and suspensions take their toll in the second half of the season, but the club finished in 11th place to complete a third successive promotion, this time to the Unibond Premier Division, that was due to the reorganisation of the league. The new club had returned to the status held by the former club when they folded, and had achieved this in just ten seasons.

Gary Wilkinson was unable to continue with the club any longer due to financial constraints, and Pete Smurthwaite, of PBS Construction, bought the club. After the resignation of Billy Heath Pete, he brought in Paul Marshall. Marshall was replaced by the management team of Ash Berry and Paul Stoneman, with the help of Coach Grant Crookes. After a year in charge, they were also replaced by the temporary charge of former Grimsby Town defender Mark Lever, with the help of Peter Smurthwaite Town finished bottom of the UniBond league and were relegated back to the Northern counties east league.

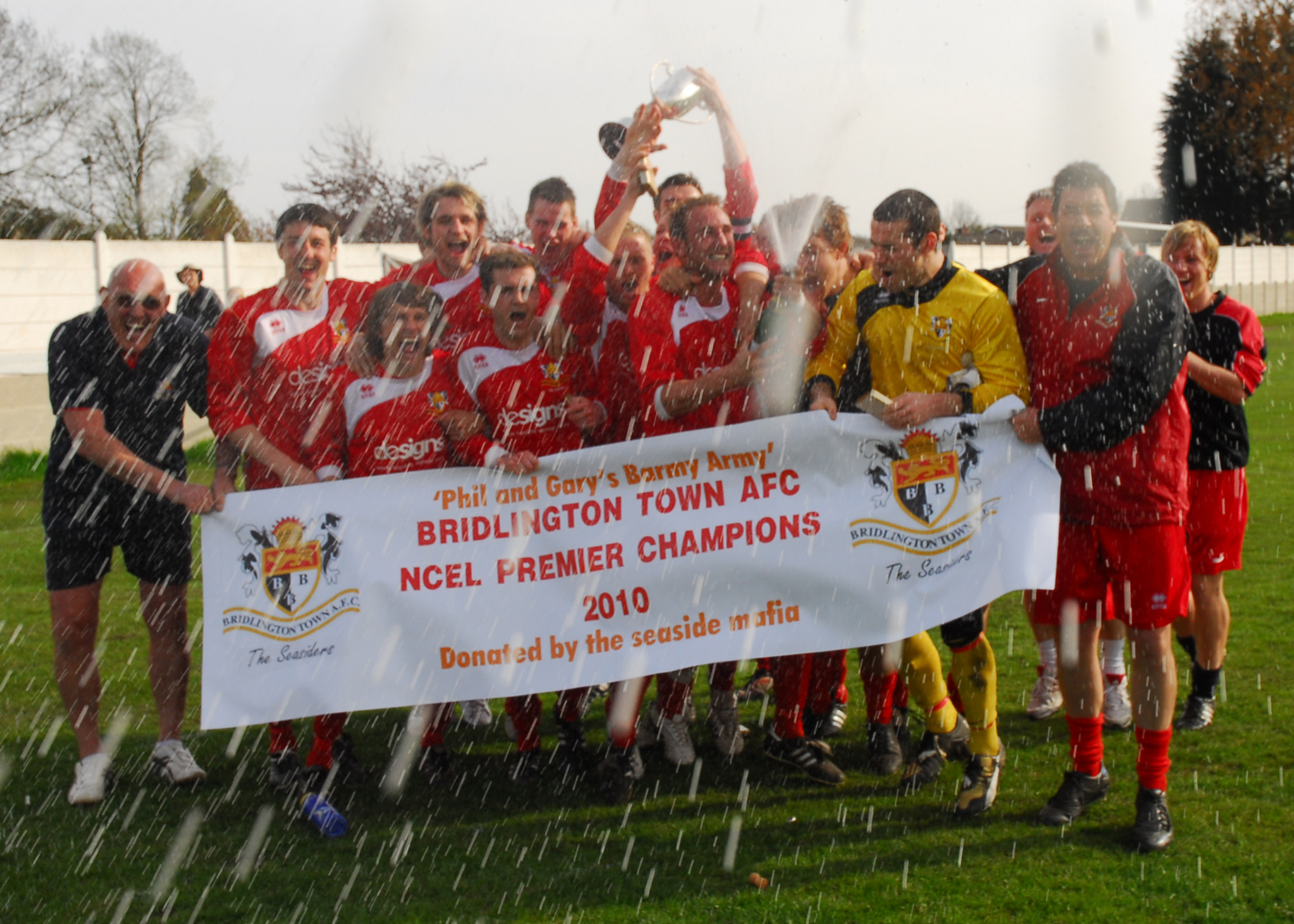
NCEL Premier division Champions 2010

==== 2008–09 ====
Season Chairman Peter Smurthwaite appoints Tim Hotte and Gary Allanson as joint managers, and the club finishes in fourth position in the league. They lost to UniBond Premier side North Ferriby in the East Riding senior cup final at the KC Stadium, and within days, the management team had resigned from the club for personal reasons. Allanson ran the club once again, appointing club Captain Phil Harrison as his assistant, and the club went on to win the league by 11 points, scoring 123 league goals along the way.

==== 2010–11, 2011–12 ====
Town lost out to Farsley, with Parkgate being runners up. Town fans were left shocked when manager Gary Allanson decided to leave the club at the end of the season and was involved in helping select his successor Mitch Cook, the former Scarborough Town and Pickering Town Manager, who will take charge for the 2011/12 season,

In Cook's first season, Town finished runners up to Retford, missing out on the title by one point, but were successful in the East riding cup, beating Hall Road reserves 9–2 in the cup final at the KC Stadium in Hull.

==== 2012–13 ====
Under management of Cook, the club finished in third place with 95 points, scoring 137 league goals along the way. This was to be Cook's last season in charge, as he announced he would have to stand down due to work commitments.

==== 2013–14 ====
Allanson returned as manager, despite a big rebuilding programme. Due to players leaving, the club finished 12th in the NCEL and lost 5–2 to North Ferriby in the senior cup final.

==== 2014–15 ====
Another season under Allanson had the team finish in eighth place in the league, but some silverware in the East Riding Senior cup after a 4–2 win against Hull United where Craig Hogg scored a hat-trick.

==== 2015–16 ====
The Seasiders won a fifth-place finish in the NCEL and got to the League Cup semi-final losing 1–0 to eventual winners Cleethorpes Town, but the club went on to retain the East Riding Senior Cup after a 1–0 win over North Ferriby United.

==== 2016–17 ====
The Seasiders had their best run in the National Cup competitions for fifth-place, reaching the FA Cup second qualifier and taking Harrogate Town to a replay. It was a goal from former Seasider Chib Chilaka, who scored at the 89th minute, that won the replay 3–2 for Harrogate. The club also went on to the first round of the FA Vase.

It was after a 3–1 away win at Harrogate Railway that the club was shocked by the news that Allanson announced he would be leaving for personal reasons, Chairman Peter Smurthwaite acted swiftly and appointed former professional footballer and British boxing champion Curtis Woodhouse, along with former Hull City Legend Ian Ashbee as his assistant. The Seasiders went on a 14-match winning run that saw the club close in on the title race with a third-place finish. The club beat Hull City in the East Riding Senior Cup 4–2 in the final; the club also made it to the League Cup final losing 4–1 to Penistone Church FC at Bramall Lane.

==== 2017–18 ====
Inspirational assistant manager Ian Ashbee left the club and was replaced by former Seasiders player Mally Parker. Players including Nicky McNamara, Jamie Forrester, and Brett Agnew, were injured on the opening day of the season. The club also lost key players to North Ferriby United. Local player Jake Day scored 48 goals and finished as the top scorer in the NCEL Premier division.

Town finished ninth in the league, who lost in the league cup semi-final to AFC Mansfield and reaching the East Riding Senior Cup final, losing 2–1 to Hull City at the East Riding FA headquarters.

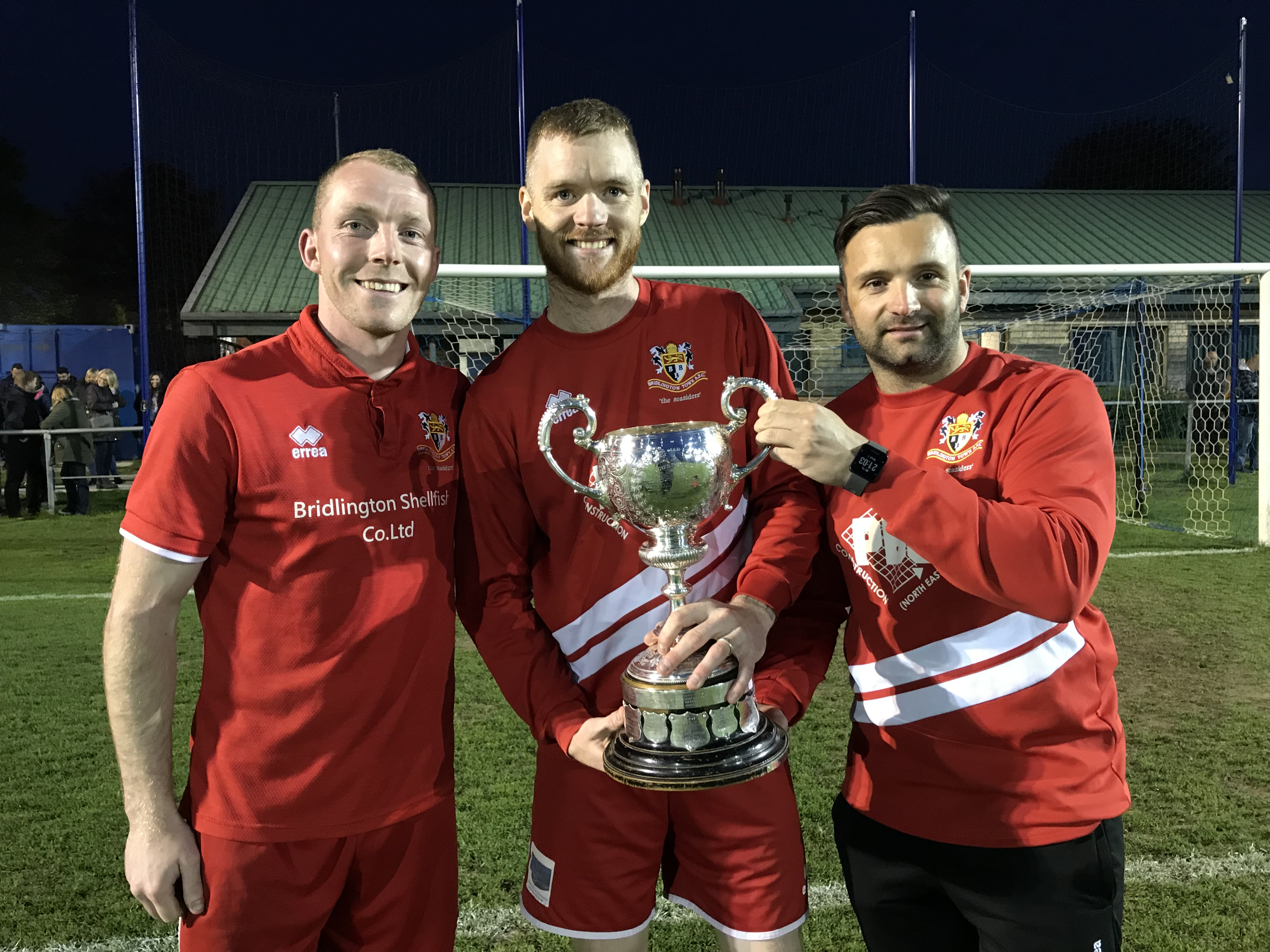
From left to right: Brett Agnew, Mike Thompson and Anthony Bowsley pictured with the East Riding Senior Cup

Since the departure of Curtis Woodhouse, the team had been managed by aspiring caretaker manager Brett Agnew, along with assistant Anthony Bowsley. After a successful trial period, they were given the post on a permanent basis. The Seasiders finished third place in the league and won the East Riding Senior Cup Final against Hull City u23s 3–1.

==== 2019–20 ====
In the 2019–20 season, when three promotion places were available, Brett Agnew and assistant Anthony Bowsley had to postpone promotions when the season was ended due to the COVID-19 outbreak.

==== 2020–21 ====
The 2020–21 season was another disrupted season due to the pandemic. The season ended after just nine games, and the Seasiders finished with seven wins and two defeats. Due to a new league formation in the Northern Premier League, Bridlington were offered a promotion to the new East division, which was accepted by the club.

Both Brett Agnew and his assistant Joe Lamplough announced that they were departing at the end of the 2021–22 season. The club won against Dunston FC, meaning the Seasiders would be in the Northern Premier league East division for another season.

Former Bridlington player, and more recently, coach Mike Thompson was appointed the new Manager, with assistance from coach Adrian Costello, and goalkeeper coach Ron Milham.

In December 2025, Scott Kerr was appointed as First Team Manager, alongside Mark Hotte as Assistant Manager.

==== Sale ====
In February 2024, owner Pete Smurthwaite put the club up for sale, 20-years after taking control of the club. On 9 July 2024, it was announced that Hull-based firm HDM Worldwide had purchased the club.

2026 Cup Run

Bridlington Town managed to secure victory over 1-0 Macclesfield FC on Saturday 14th November 2026, progressing to the third round of the FA Trophy, further than at any time in the clubs history.

== Current squad ==
As of 3 February 2026.

Note: Flags indicate national team as defined under FIFA eligibility rules; some limited exceptions apply. Players may hold more than one non-FIFA nationality.

| No. | Pos. | Nation | Player |
|---|---|---|---|
| — | GK | ENG | Jonathan Dash |
| — | GK | ENG | Marc Wain |
| — | DF | ENG | Benn Lewis |
| — | DF | ENG | Alex Markham |
| — | DF | ENG | Josh Barrett |
| — | DF | ENG | Tom Allan |
| — | DF | ENG | Jak Whiting |
| — | DF | ENG | Alex Zachariou |
| — | DF | ENG | Kasper Williams |
| — | DF | ENG | Brodie Sedman |
| — | MF | ENG | Pete Davidson |

| No. | Pos. | Nation | Player |
|---|---|---|---|
| — | MF | VGB | Johari Lacey |
| — | MF | ENG | Ahmed Salam |
| — | MF | ENG | Matty Dixon |
| — | MF | ENG | Casey Stewart |
| — | MF | ENG | Charley Whight |
| — | MF | ENG | Cameron Blackburn |
| — | MF | ENG | Alex Huntsman |
| — | FW | ENG | Danny Earl |
| — | FW | ENG | Michael Coulson |
| — | FW | ENG | Coby Scotter |
| — | FW | ENG | Jake Day |

== Managers ==
| Name | Job | From | To |
|---|---|---|---|
| (England) Henry (Harry) Brown | Manager | 1957 | 1960 |
| (England) Ken Smales | Manager | 19?? | 1963 |
| (England) Bob Dennison | Manager | 1963 | 1964 |
| (England) Eric Roberts | Manager | 1958 | 1959 |
| (England) John (Gadge) Thompson | Manager | 1959 | 1960 |
| (England) Dave King | Manager | 1970 | 1971 |
| (England) George Quinn | Manager | 1972 | 1975 |
| (England) Eric Holah | Manager | 1975 | 1978 |
| (England) Ken Wagstaff | Manager | 1978 | 1980 |
| (England) Paul Staveley | Manager | 1980 | 1981 |
| (England) Ian Blott | Manager | 1981 | 1982 |
| (England) Paul (Jossa)Johnson | Manager | 1982 | 1988 |
| (England) Colin Appleton | Manager | 1988 | 1989 |
| (England) John Reid | Manager | 1989 | 1990 |
| (England) Neil Brandon | Manager | 1990 | 1992 |
| (England) Colin Richardson | Manager | 1992 | 1993 |
| (England) Pete Schofield | Manager | 1993 | 1993 |
| (England) Colin Morris | Manager | 1992 | 1993 |
| (England) John Noble | Manager | 1994 | 1995 |
| (England) John Bowman | Manager | 1995 | 2000 |
| (England) Billy Heath | Manager | 2000 | 2007 |
| (England) Paul Marshall | Manager | 2007 | 2007 |
| (England) Ash Berry & Paul Stoneman | Manager | 2007 | 2008 |
| (England) Peter Smurthwaite & Mark Lever | Manager | 2008 | 2008 |
| (England) Gary Allanson & Tim Hotte | Manager | 2008 | 2009 |
| (England) Gary Allanson | Manager | 2009 | 2011 |
| (England) Mitch Cook | Manager | 2011 | 2014 |
| (England) Gary Allanson | Manager | 2014 | 2016 |
| (England) Curtis Woodhouse | Manager | 2016 | 2018 |
| (Scotland) Brett Agnew | Manager | 2018 | 2022 |
| (England) Mike Thompson | Manager | 2022 | 2023 |
| (England) Adrian Costello | Manager | 2022 | 2024 |
| (England) Denny Ingram | Manager | 2024 | 2025 |
| (England) Mike Thompson | Manager | 2025 | 2025 |
| (England) Scott Kerr | Manager | 2025 | — |

== Honours ==
- Northern Premier League First Division
  - Champions: 1992–93
- NCEL Premier Division
  - Champions: 1989–90, 2002–03, 2009–10
- NCEL Division One
  - Runners-up: 2001–02
  - Promoted: 1985–86
- Yorkshire League
  - Champions: 1966–67
- Yorkshire League Division Two
  - Champions: 1974–75
  - Runners-up: 1959–60
- FA Vase
  - Winners: 1992–93
  - Runners-up: 1989–90
- East Riding Senior Cup
  - Winners: 2011–12, 2014–15, 2015–16, 2016–17, 2018–19, 2022–23

== Records ==
- FA Cup
  - First Round: defeated 3–2 by Bishop Auckland in 1960–61 and defeated 2–1 by York City in 1991–92.
- FA Trophy
  - Third Round: 2026–27
