= It's War =

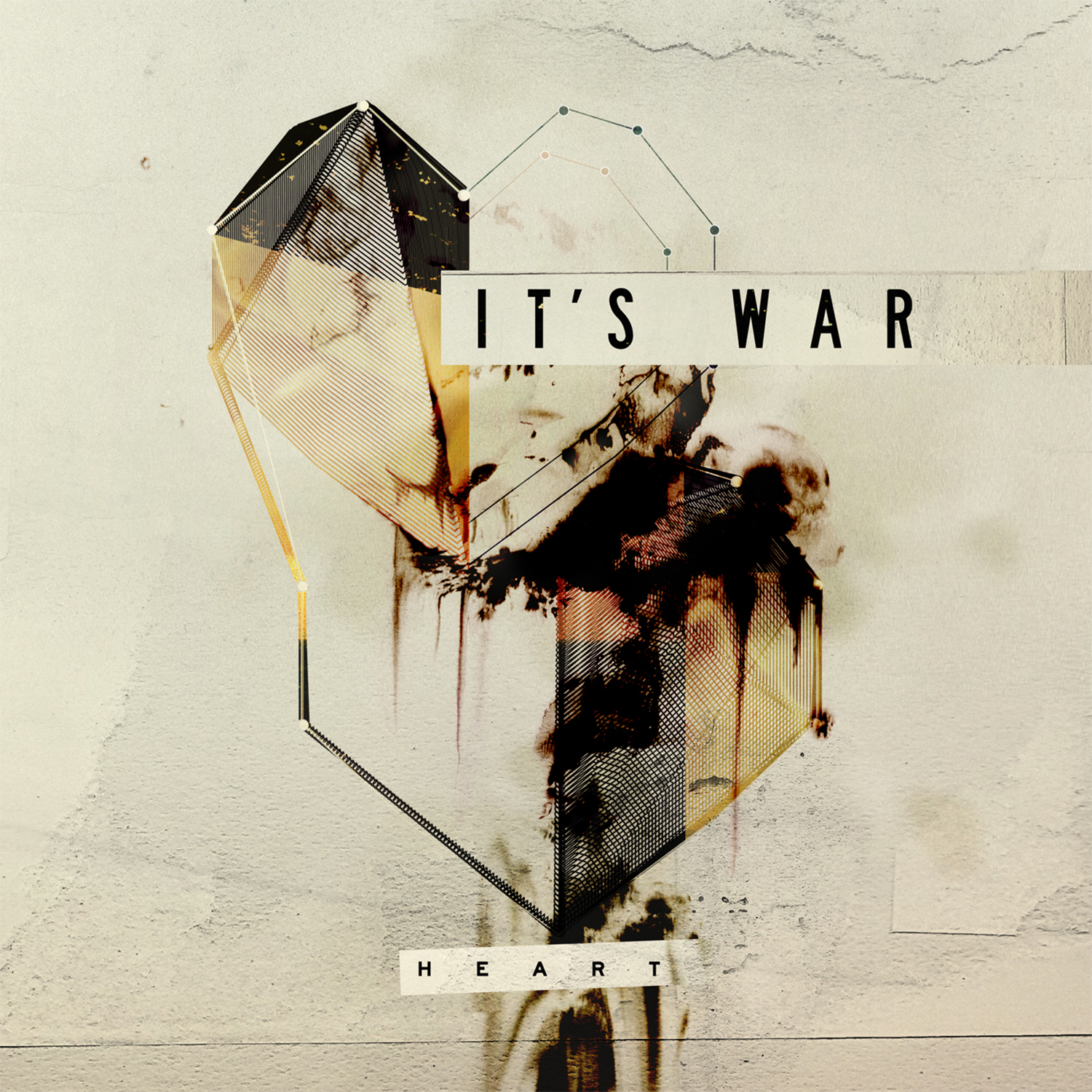
- Heart Single Art

Background information
- Origin: Montreal/Nashville
- Genres: Rock
- Years active: 2014–present
- Labels: Epicly Dumb
- Members: Lennon Murphy, Billy Dale, Greg Huff, Ryan Danley

It's War is a side project band created by Lennon Murphy and Frank Shooflar. They released their first single "Heart" in 2014.
