= Jared Cole =

Theoretical physicist

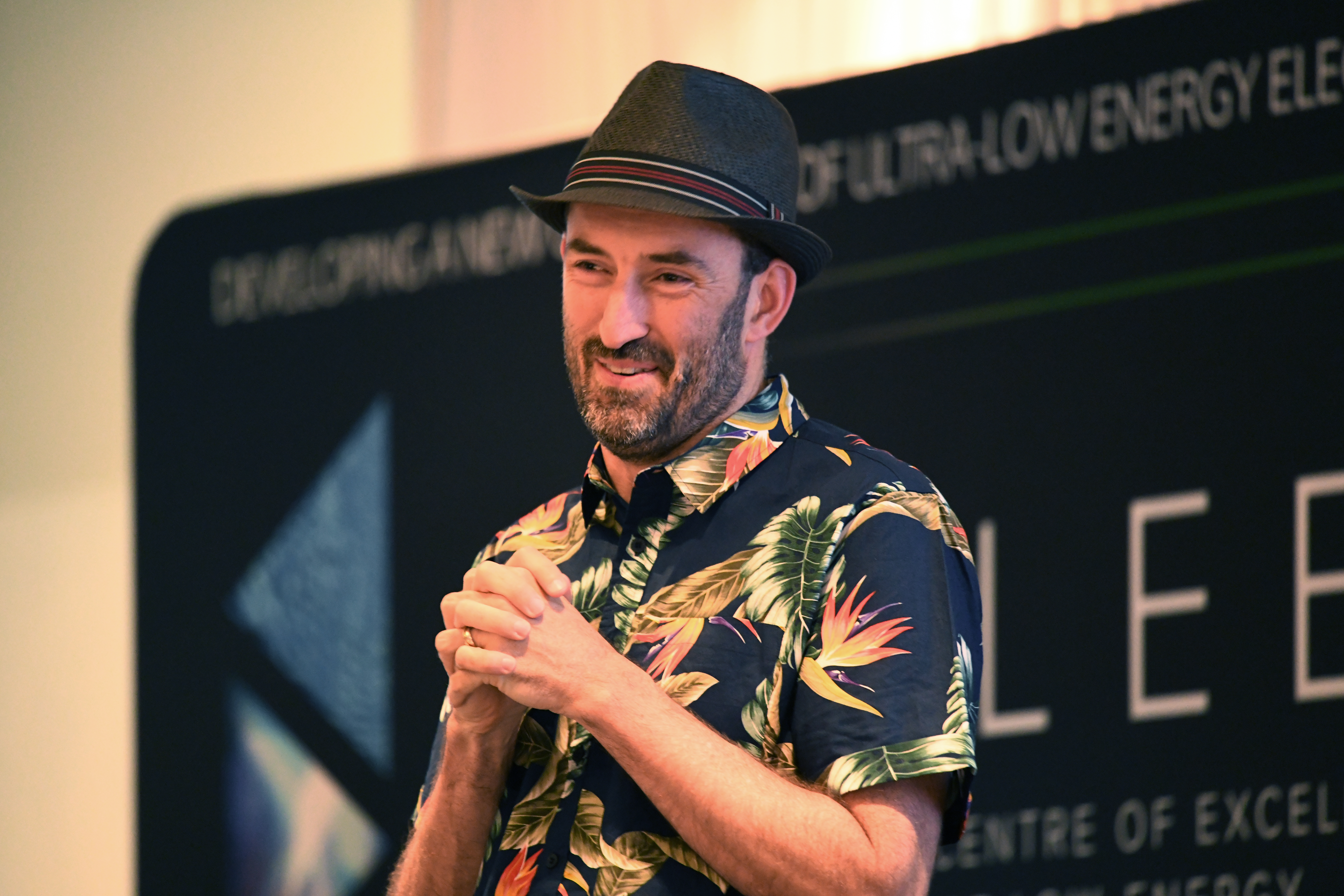
- Jared Cole, December 2018
- Education: RMIT University (B. App Physics and B. Comm Eng (Hons)), University of Melbourne (PhD)
- Known for: quantum physics, decoherence theory, Superconducting quantum computing
- Scientific career
- Fields: Physics
- Workplaces: RMIT University; University of Melbourne; Karlsruhe University; ARC Centre of Excellence in Future Low-Energy Electronics Technologies (FLEET); ARC Centre for Exciton Science
- Thesis: Controllable few-state quantum systems for information processing
- Doctoral advisor: Lloyd CL Hollenberg

Jared Cole FAIP is an Australian theoretical physicist specialising in quantum physics and decoherence theory and its application to solid-state systems. He specialises in using mathematical and computational models to describe the design and operation of quantum computing and quantum electronic devices.

Cole is a professor at RMIT University where he studies condensed-matter physics, superconducting devices, charge transport in nanoscale devices, quantum metrology and decoherence theory. He is currently Director of the RMIT Applied Quantum Technologies Research Centre. Cole is also a Fellow of the Australian Institute of Physics.

== Education ==
Cole completed a Bachelor of Applied Physics and Communication Engineering (Hons) from RMIT University in 2002 and a PhD University of Melbourne in 2006 (Controllable few-state quantum systems for information processing).

== Expertise ==
Quantum circuit theory, superconducting devices based on the Josephson effect, spin physics, decoherence, measurement and entanglement theory, quantum information and quantum computing.

== Career ==
Following his PhD, Cole was a postdoctoral researcher within the Australian Research Council Centre of Excellence for Quantum Computer Technology, University of Melbourne from 2006 to 2007, studying solid-state quantum computing. Following this, Cole was awarded an Alexander von Humboldt Fellow) position at Karlsruhe University 2007–11, studying qubit characterisation, superconducting qubits and defects in Josephson junctions. He then returned to RMIT University, after being awarded a Vice-Chancellor's senior research fellowship in 2010. Cole was made a full professor at RMIT in Jan 2018.

In 2006 Cole was one of a number of authors to simultaneously propose the concept of the Jaynes–Cummings–Hubbard model

In 2016, he established, with Simon Devitt of University of Technology, Sydney, the first consultancy specialising in quantum technology, which became a founding member of the Spanish based industry group, the Quantum World Association (QWA).

Since 2009, Cole has worked extensively on the role of defects in oxides and their influence on Superconducting quantum computing, including helping pioneer the use of qubits and microwave resonators as probes of these defects.

Cole was a chief investigator within the ARC Centre of Excellence in Future Low-Energy Electronics Technologies (FLEET), investigating the influence of dissipation and decoherence on electronic transport in nanostructures, and its role in electronic devices based on topologically protected conduction channels. Simultaneously, Cole was a chief investigator within the ARC Centre of Excellence for Exciton Science, applying expertise in electron transport, spin physics and decoherence theory to understanding the control and manipulation of excitons to create more-efficient solar cells.

In 2021 Cole was awarded a Catalyst International Leader Fellowship by the Royal Society of New Zealand for a project entitled Using exotic materials for novel spintronic and superconducting devices, hosted at Victoria University of Wellington.

=== Publications, Writings ===
Cole has authored over 100 peer-reviewed publications, has been cited over 7000 times and has an h-index of 43. He holds five patents.

In addition to scientific publications, Cole has also written general-audience articles on Australia quantum research, low-energy electronics (in The Conversation), and has been interviewed on metric units and ICT energy use.

=== Major Projects ===
- 2017-2023 ARC Centre of Excellence in Exciton Science – Chief Investigator
- 2017-2023 ARC Centre of Excellence in Future Low-Energy Electronics Technologies – Chief Investigator
- 2014-2016 ARC Discovery Project, Understanding and eliminating dissipation in superconducting devices: the origin of two-level defects - Lead Investigator

=== Awards and fellowships ===
- 2021 Catalyst International Leaders Fellowship of the Royal Society of New Zealand
- 2015 Peter Schwerdtfeger Award of the Australian Association of Alexander von Humboldt Fellows
- 2011–2015 Vice-Chancellor's Senior Research Fellow, RMIT University
- 2007-2009 Alexander von Humboldt Fellowship, Karlsruhe University
