= John Kilford =

English footballer

Personal information
- Full name: John Douglas Kilford
- Date of birth: 8 November 1938
- Place of birth: Derby, England
- Date of death: 2012 (aged 73–74)
- Position: Full back

Senior career*
Years	Team	Apps	(Gls)
1956–1957	Derby Corinthians		
1958–1959	Notts County	26	(0)
1959–1962	Leeds United	21	(0)
1962	Tonbridge Angels		
Total		47	(0)
- * Club domestic league appearances and goals

John Douglas Kilford (8 November 1938 – 2012) was an English professional footballer player who played in the Football League for Leeds United and Notts County.
