= Eric Holah =

English footballer (1937–2023)

Personal information
- Full name: Eric Tansley Holah
- Date of birth: 3 August 1937
- Place of birth: Hull, England
- Date of death: March 2023 (aged 85)
- Place of death: Cambridgeshire, England
- Positions: Centre forward; centre back

Youth career
- Malet Lambert OB

Senior career*
Years	Team	Apps	(Gls)
1958–1961	Hull City	1	(1)
1961–1963	Bradford City	4	(2)
1963–1964	Goole Town		
1964–1967	Bridlington Town		
1968	Crewe Alexandra	0	(0)
1968	Holyhead Town		
1969–1970	Ellesmere Port Town		
1970–1972	Bridlington Trinity		
1972–1973	Bridlington Town		
1973–1974	Bridlington Trinity		
1980	Bridlington Town		
Total		5+	(3+)

Managerial career
- 1972–1973: Bridlington Town
- * Club domestic league appearances and goals

Eric Tansley Holah (3 August 1937 – March 2023) was an English professional football player and coach who played as a centre forward and centre back.

== Career ==
Born in Hull, Holah played for Malet Lambert Old Boys before signing for Hull City on amateur terms in 1958. He made one Football League appearance for Hull on 1 April 1961 against Watford where he scored in a 3–2 win. He signed for Bradford City on professional terms in July 1961, leaving the club in 1963. During his time with Bradford City he made four appearances in the Football League, scoring twice.

After Bradford, he spent a year at Goole Town and then moved to Bridlington Town in 1964 where he played for three years, also working for Hull City Council at the same time. He left Bridlington to attend training college, and signed for Crewe Alexandra in 1968, playing as a centre-back in their reserves. He later played for Holyhead Town, Ellesmere Port Town and Bridlington Trinity. He became manager of Bridlington Town in 1972, also playing for the club, whilst working as a PE teacher at Headlands School. He then returned to Bridlington Trinity in 1973, retiring at the end of the season, after which he coached East Riding Schoolboys and Bridlington Youth Club. He became secretary of Bridlington Town in July 1980 and made a final appearance for the club, also continuing to teach at Headlands.

== Personal life and death ==
His brother-in-law was David Fraser, who married Holah's sister. Holah died in Cambridgeshire in March 2023, at the age of 85.

== Sources ==
- Frost, Terry (1988). Bradford City A Complete Record 1903-1988. Breedon Books Sport. ISBN 0-907969-38-0.
