= Kae Nemoto =

Japanese physicist

Kae Nemoto (Japanese: 根本 香絵) is a Japanese theoretical physicist known for her research on photonics, superradiance, quantum energy transport, and linear optical quantum computing. She is a professor at the National Institute of Informatics (NII) and at The Graduate University for Advanced Studies, director of the Global Research Center for Quantum Information Science at the NII, and co-director of the Japanese-French Laboratory for Informatics. Since April 2022, she leads the Quantum Information Science and Technology Unit at OIST Graduate University, Okinawa, Japan.

== Education ==
After studying physics at Tokai University, Nemoto did her graduate studies at Ochanomizu University, where she earned a master's degree in 1993 and completed a doctorate in 1995. In 1995, Nemoto undertook postdoctoral research at the University of Queensland in Australia and the University of Wales in the United Kingdom. She focused on the theoretical foundations of quantum information science, contributing to early developments in quantum computing and quantum optics.

== Awards and recognition ==
In 2015, Nemoto was named as a Fellow of the American Physical Society (APS), after a nomination from the APS Division of Quantum Information, "for pioneering the theory for quantum optical implementations of quantum information processing and communication". She is also a Fellow of the Institute of Physics.

In 2022, Nemoto was appointed as an Officer of the National Order of Merit of the French Republic, the title awarded for distinguished civil or military achievements. The decoration was given in recognition of her work as a co-director of the Japanese-French Laboratory for Informatics (JFLI), where she has cultivated strong research ties between Japan and France.

In 2025, Nemoto received the Ministry of Education, Culture, Sports, Science and Technology (MEXT) Minister's Award for Science and Technology in the Research category. The award recognized her pioneering work on quantum computer architecture theory and her contributions to the development of fault-tolerant quantum computers.
