= Charlie Billington =

English footballer

Personal information
- Full name: Charles Roy Billington
- Date of birth: 8 November 1927
- Place of birth: Chesterfield, England
- Date of death: 19 November 1985 (aged 58)
- Place of death: Chesterfield, England
- Position: Defender

Senior career*
Years	Team	Apps	(Gls)
- Parkhouse Colliery
1944–1946	Chesterfield	0	(0)
1946–1956	Aldershot	212	(11)
1956–1957	Norwich City	22	(0)
1957–1958	Watford	14	(0)
1958–1959	Mansfield Town	1	(0)
1959–19??	Burton Albion		
- * Club domestic league appearances and goals

Charles Roy Billington (8 November 1927 – 19 November 1985) was an English professional footballer who made 249 appearances in the Football League playing as a defender for Aldershot (226 appearances in all competitions), Norwich City, Watford and Mansfield Town. He was on the books of hometown club Chesterfield as an amateur, but never played for their first team, and played non-league football for Parkhouse Colliery and Burton Albion.
