= George Darwin (footballer) =

English footballer (1932–2019)

Personal information
- Full name: George Hedworth Darwin
- Date of birth: 16 May 1932
- Place of birth: Chester-le-Street, England
- Date of death: June 2019 (aged 87)
- Position: Inside forward

Youth career
- Kimblesworth Juniors

Senior career*
Years	Team	Apps	(Gls)
1950–1953	Huddersfield Town	0	(0)
1953–1957	Mansfield Town	126	(63)
1957–1960	Derby County	94	(32)
1960–1961	Rotherham United	2	(2)
1961–1964	Barrow	92	(28)
- Boston
Total		314	(125)
- * Club domestic league appearances and goals

George Hedworth Darwin (16 May 1932 – June 2019) was an English professional footballer who played as an inside forward.

== Career ==
Born in Chester-le-Street, Darwin played for Kimblesworth Juniors, Huddersfield Town, Mansfield Town, Derby County, Rotherham United, Barrow, and Boston.
