= Dave Smith (footballer, born 1936) =

English footballer

Personal information
- Full name: Frank David Smith
- Date of birth: 27 July 1936
- Place of birth: Holymoorside, England
- Date of death: June 2015 (aged 78)
- Place of death: Poole, England
- Position: Right winger

Senior career*
Years	Team	Apps	(Gls)
1953–1954	Chesterfield	7	(0)
1954–1955	Boston United		
1955–1957	Mansfield Town	31	(4)
1957–1958	Derby County	0	(0)
1958–1959	Coventry City	28	(2)
1959–1960	Kidderminster Harriers		
Total		66	(6)
- * Club domestic league appearances and goals

Frank David Smith (27 July 1936 – June 2015) was an English professional footballer who played as a right winger in the Football League for Chesterfield, Mansfield Town and Coventry City. He was on the books of Derby County without representing them in the League, and played non-league football for clubs including Boston United and Kidderminster Harriers.
