= David Fraser (footballer) =

Scottish footballer

Personal information
- Full name: David McLean Fraser
- Date of birth: 6 June 1937
- Place of birth: Newtongrange, Scotland
- Date of death: January 2019 (aged 81)
- Position: Left winger

Youth career
- 1952–1953: Broughton Star
- 1953: Arniston Rangers
- 1953–1955: Hull City

Senior career*
Years	Team	Apps	(Gls)
1955–1958	Hull City	11	(7)
1958–1959	Mansfield Town	6	(1)
1959–1960	Third Lanark	7	(1)
1960–1963	Cowdenbeath	83	(46)
- North Ferriby United
Total		107+	(55+)

Managerial career
- Hull Brunswick
- North Ferriby United
- * Club domestic league appearances and goals

David McLean Fraser (6 June 1937 – January 2019) was a Scottish professional football player, coach and scout who played as a left winger.

== Career ==
Born in Newtongrange, Fraser played for Broughton Star and Arniston Rangers before signing for Hull City in 1953. He turned professional in 1954, and joined the first-team for the 1955–56 season. He later played for Mansfield Town, Third Lanark, Cowdenbeath and North Ferriby United. Whilst playing for North Ferriby he worked as a prison officer in a borstal. He later managed Hull Brunswick and North Ferriby United, before working as a scout for a number of clubs, including Hull City.

== Personal life ==
He was married to Eric Holah's sister.
