= Malcolm Flowers =

English footballer

Personal information
- Full name: Malcolm Thomas Flowers
- Date of birth: 9 August 1938 (age 88)
- Place of birth: Mansfield, England
- Position: Centre-back

Senior career*
Years	Team	Apps	(Gls)
1956–1957	Mansfield Town	3	(0)
Total		3	(0)
- * Club domestic league appearances and goals

Malcolm Thomas Flowers (born 9 August 1938) is an English former professional footballer who played in the Football League for Mansfield Town.
