= Ralph Cann =

English footballer (1934–2024)

Personal information
- Full name: Ralph Graham Cann
- Date of birth: 17 November 1934
- Place of birth: Sheffield, England
- Date of death: 22 September 2024 (aged 89)
- Place of death: Rotherham, England
- Position: Defender

Senior career*
Years	Team	Apps	(Gls)
1957–1958	Mansfield Town	1	(0)
Total		1	(0)
- * Club domestic league appearances and goals

Ralph Graham Cann (17 November 1934 – 22 September 2024) was an English professional footballer who played in the Football League for Mansfield Town. Cann died in Rotherham on 22 September 2024, at the age of 89.
