= Terry Vaughan =

Welsh football player

Personal information
- Full name: Terence Ronald Vaughan
- Date of birth: 22 April 1938 (age 88)
- Place of birth: Ebbw Vale, Wales
- Position: Inside forward

Senior career*
Years	Team	Apps	(Gls)
1958–1959	Mansfield Town	6	(2)
Total		6	(2)
- * Club domestic league appearances and goals

Terence Ronald Vaughan (born 22 April 1938) is a Welsh former professional footballer who played in the Football League for Mansfield Town.
