= Vincent McBride =

English footballer

Vince McBride
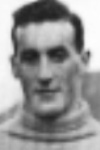
- McBride in 1952

Personal information
- Full name: Vincent McBride
- Date of birth: 21 January 1934
- Place of birth: Stalybridge, England
- Date of death: 20 May 2005 (aged 71)
- Place of death: Cheshire, England
- Position: Goalkeeper

Youth career
- 19??–1952: Stalybridge Celtic

Senior career*
Years	Team	Apps	(Gls)
1952–1954	Ashton United	76	(0)
1954–1956	Walsall	11	(0)
1956–1958	Aston Villa	0	(0)
1958–1959	Mansfield Town	10	(0)
1959–1960	Northwich Victoria	?	(?)
–	Colwyn Bay	?	(?)
–	Rhyl	?	(?)
1962–1963	Mossley	32	(0)
- * Club domestic league appearances and goals

Vincent McBride (21 January 1934 – 20 May 2005) was a footballer who played in the Football League for Walsall and Mansfield Town.

Vince McBride was associated with Aston Villa for a period of two years without establishing himself in the first team. He had spells with Northwich Victoria, Colwyn Bay and Rhyl before joining Mossley in 1962. McBride successfully limited the young giant of a keeper's Jock Wallace, Jr. appearances for the Ashton United (Hurst F.C) first team; being one of two Football League calibre keepers on the books at the same time.

== Later life ==
Vince McBride went on to teach P.E at West Hill School, where he had been Head Boy in 1949, after his footballing career.

He settled in Cheshire after retirement until his death in 2005. A bench at Sandiway Golf Club is set on the 12th hole in his memory.
