= Fred Morris (footballer, born 1929) =

English footballer and manager

Personal information
- Full name: Frederick William Morris
- Date of birth: 15 June 1929
- Place of birth: Oswestry, England
- Date of death: 20 November 1998 (aged 69)
- Position: Winger

Senior career*
Years	Team	Apps	(Gls)
?–1950	Oswestry Town		
1950–1957	Walsall	213	(44)
1957–1958	Mansfield Town	56	(17)
1958–1960	Liverpool	47	(14)
1960–1961	Crewe Alexandra	8	(1)
1961	Gillingham	11	(1)
1961–1962	Chester	29	(3)
1962–?	Altrincham		
- Oswestry Town

Managerial career
- 1969-1973, 1980-1983: Oswestry Town
- * Club domestic league appearances and goals

Fred Morris (15 June 1929 – 20 November 1998) was a professional footballer who played as a winger. He played in the Football League for six clubs.

== Playing career ==
Morris was born in Oswestry and began his playing career with non-league Oswestry Town before joining Walsall in May 1950. He made more than 200 league appearances for the Walsall before moving to Mansfield Town in March 1957 for £1,500. In May 1958, Morris moved again, joining the Division Two side Liverpool for £7,000.

Morris was initially a regular at Anfield but he played in just one match after the arrival of Bill Shankly as manager in December 1959. He spent the 1960–61 season with Crewe Alexandra and then Gillingham. He joined Chester in July 1961, playing more than half the games as the side finished bottom of the Football League. At the end of the season he was released by the manager, Bill Lambton, and he joined Altrincham. This was followed by a return to Oswestry Town, where he became manager in two spells (1969–73 and 1980–83).

Away from football, Morris ran a building contractor's business and took over a garage in Oswestry.
