= Ken Mellor =

English footballer (1934–2021)

Personal information
- Full name: Kenneth Edward Mellor
- Date of birth: 22 August 1934
- Place of birth: Leicester, England
- Date of death: 6 January 2021 (aged 86)
- Place of death: Leicester, England
- Positions: Defender; striker

Senior career*
Years	Team	Apps	(Gls)
1954–1955	Ashwell & Nesbitt		
1955–1956	Leicester City	0	(0)
1957–1959	Mansfield Town	66	(0)
1959–1961	Swindon Town	32	(4)
1962–1964	Hinckley Athletic		
1964–1966	Rugby Town		
1966	Hinckley Athletic		
Total		98	(4)
- * Club domestic league appearances and goals

Kenneth Edward Mellor (22 August 1934 – 6 January 2021) was an English professional footballer who played in the Football League for Mansfield Town and Swindon Town. Ken caught the eye of Leicester City scouts as a striker, scoring 99 goals in one season with Ashwell & Nesbitt, a works team from Barkby Road in Leicester. He was released by Leicester City without playing a first team game and was converted to a central defender by Mansfield Town manager Charlie Mitten due to his aerial ability.

Mellor died in Leicester on 6 January 2021, at the age of 86.
