= Stan Keery =

English footballer

Personal information
- Date of birth: 9 September 1931
- Place of birth: Derby, England
- Date of death: 7 March 2013 (aged 81)
- Place of death: Leighton, England
- Position: Wing half

Youth career
- Blackburn Rovers

Senior career*
Years	Team	Apps	(Gls)
1952–1953	Shrewsbury Town	15	(2)
1953–1957	Newcastle United	19	(1)
1957–1958	Mansfield Town	53	(17)
1958–1964	Crewe Alexandra	254	(23)
Total		341	(43)
- * Club domestic league appearances and goals

Stan Keery (9 September 1931 – 7 March 2013) was an English professional footballer who played as a wing half.

== Career ==
Born in Derby, Keery played for Blackburn Rovers, Shrewsbury Town, Newcastle United, Mansfield Town and Crewe Alexandra, making a total of 341 appearances in the Football League. He died on 7 March 2013.
