= Ray Kirkham =

English footballer

Personal information
- Full name: Raymond Neville Kirkham
- Date of birth: 16 December 1934 (age 91)
- Place of birth: Thorne, South Yorkshire, England
- Position: Goalkeeper

Senior career*
| Years | Team | Apps | (Gls) |
| 1956–1957 | Thorne Town | | |
| 1957–1960 | Mansfield Town | 42 | (0) |
| Total | | 42 | (0) |
- * Club domestic league appearances and goals

Raymond Neville Kirkham (born 16 December 1934) is an English former professional footballer who played in the Football League for Mansfield Town.
