= Alan Rushby =

English footballer (1933–2022)

Personal information
- Full name: Alan Rushby
- Date of birth: 27 December 1933
- Place of birth: Doncaster, England
- Date of death: 20 February 2022 (aged 88)
- Position: Centre back

Senior career*
Years	Team	Apps	(Gls)
1953–1954	Doncaster Rovers	1	(0)
1956–1957	Mansfield Town	20	(0)
1957–1959	Bradford Park Avenue	12	(0)
Total		33	(0)
- * Club domestic league appearances and goals

Alan Rushby (27 December 1933 – 20 February 2022) was an English professional footballer who played in the Football League for Bradford Park Avenue, Doncaster Rovers and Mansfield Town. Rushby died on 20 February 2022, at the age of 88.
