= Keith Savin =

English footballer

Personal information
- Full name: Keith Anthony Savin
- Date of birth: 5 June 1929
- Place of birth: Oxford, England
- Date of death: 1992 (aged 62–63)
- Position: Full back

Senior career*
Years	Team	Apps	(Gls)
1949–1950	Oxford City		
1950–1956	Derby County	65	(0)
1957–1959	Mansfield Town	68	(0)
1959–1960	Nuneaton Borough		
1961	Bourne Town		
Total		133	(0)
- * Club domestic league appearances and goals

Keith Anthony Savin (5 June 1929 – 1992) was an English professional footballer who played in the Football League for Derby County and Mansfield Town.
