= Derek Chamberlain =

English footballer (1933–2013)

Personal information
- Full name: Derek Colin Chamberlain
- Date of birth: 6 January 1933
- Place of birth: Nottingham, England
- Date of death: 2013 (aged 79–80)
- Position: Full back

Senior career*
Years	Team	Apps	(Gls)
1952–1953	Parliament Street Methodists		
1953–1954	Aston Villa	0	(0)
1956–1958	Mansfield Town	43	(0)
1958–1959	York City	0	(0)
Total		43	(0)
- * Club domestic league appearances and goals

Derek Colin Chamberlain (6 January 1933 – 2013) was an English professional footballer who played in the Football League for Mansfield Town.
