= Sammy Chapman =

Northern Irish footballer and manager (1938–2019)

Personal information
- Full name: Samuel Edward Campbell Chapman
- Date of birth: 16 February 1938
- Place of birth: Belfast, Northern Ireland
- Date of death: 24 July 2019 (aged 81)
- Place of death: Wombourne, Staffordshire, England
- Position: Wing half

Youth career
- –1953: Manchester United

Senior career*
Years	Team	Apps	(Gls)
1953–1955	Glentoran		(5)
1955	Crusaders		(0)
1955–1956	Glenavon		(7)
1956	Shamrock Rovers	0	(0)
1956–1958	Mansfield Town	50	(25)
1958–1961	Portsmouth	48	(10)
1961	→ Benoni United (loan)		
1961–1964	Mansfield Town	105	(15)
1965–1966	East Rand United	13	(1)

International career
1957	Northern Ireland B	1	(1)

Managerial career
- 1985–1986: Wolverhampton Wanderers
- * Club domestic league appearances and goals

Samuel Edward Campbell Chapman (16 February 1938 – 24 July 2019) was a Northern Ireland international footballer and football manager.

== Career ==
A former youth player with Manchester United, Chapman signed for Glentoran upon returning to Northern Ireland. In the summer of 1955, he moved to Crusaders, but by October had signed for Glenavon. In July 1956 Chapman joined Shamrock Rovers.

In October 1956 he moved to Mansfield Town without having played a game for the Hoops. He moved to Portsmouth in February 1958. He re-joined Mansfield Town in December 1961. Having last played professionally in 1963, Chapman was banned from football following a bribes scandal two years later.

The ban signalled the end of Chapman's playing career, although he played a few games for South African club East Rand United. (The ban was ignored by the Apartheid-era South African federation which had been suspended by FIFA.) He eventually returned to the game as a coach with Portsmouth and then Crewe Alexandra. He then served Wolverhampton Wanderers as chief scout, becoming interim manager following the dismissal of Tommy Docherty on 4 July 1985 after a second successive relegation saw Wolves fall into the Third Division. He remained in charge of the first team until Bill McGarry (previously manager of Wolves from 1968 to 1976) returned to manage the club on 4 September 1985. However, McGarry's return as manager lasted just 61 days and he quit on 4 November and Chapman was restored to the manager's seat. However, he was unable to prevent Wolves from suffering a third successive relegation which dragged them into the Fourth Division for the first time in their history. He left on 15 August 1986, just before the start of the 1986-87 season.

Chapman was a member of Northern Ireland's 1958 FIFA World Cup squad (though not one of the 17 players that travelled).

His funeral was attended by Douglas Hope and Roger Jeffrey Hipkiss, who were the vice-chairmen of Wolverhampton Wanderers F. C. from 1982 to 1986, when he had been a member of the club.
