= Joe Thomas (footballer, born 1932) =

English footballer

Personal information
- Full name: John Charles Thomas
- Date of birth: 22 September 1932 (age 94)
- Place of birth: Great Houghton, South Yorkshire, England
- Position: Defender

Senior career*
Years	Team	Apps	(Gls)
1950–1951	Wath Wanderers		
1951–1952	Wolverhampton Wanderers	0	(0)
1952–1958	Barnsley	134	(0)
1958–1959	Mansfield Town	41	(0)
1959–1960	Chesterfield	6	(0)
Total		181	(0)
- * Club domestic league appearances and goals

For the Welsh footballer see Joe Thomas (footballer, born 2002)

John Charles Thomas (born 22 September 1932) is an English former professional footballer who played in the Football League for Barnsley, Chesterfield and Mansfield Town.
