= Barrie Thomas =

English footballer (1937–2025)

Personal information
- Date of birth: 19 May 1937
- Place of birth: Measham, England
- Date of death: 30 August 2025 (aged 88)
- Position: Forward

Youth career
- 1952–1954: Leicester City

Senior career*
Years	Team	Apps	(Gls)
1954–1957	Leicester City	7	(3)
1957–1959	Mansfield Town	72	(48)
1959–1962	Scunthorpe United	91	(67)
1962–1964	Newcastle United	73	(48)
1964–1966	Scunthorpe United	52	(26)
1966–1968	Barnsley	43	(19)
Total		338	(211)
- * Club domestic league appearances and goals

Barrie Thomas (19 May 1937 – 30 August 2025) was an English professional footballer who played as a forward. Over the course of his career, Thomas made a total of 338 appearances in the Football League for five clubs over a period of fourteen years, scoring 211 goals.

== Background ==
Barrie Thomas was born on 19 May 1937 in Measham, Leicestershire. He died on 30 August 2025, at the age of 88.

== Career ==
Thomas began his career as a youth player with Leicester City. His senior career began with Leicester City as a seventeen-year-old in 1954, but over the next three seasons, Thomas only managed to play in seven league games, scoring three league goals in the process. Thomas moved to Mansfield Town in 1957, and spent two seasons with the club, scoring 48 league goals in 72 league games. Thomas' next club was Scunthorpe United, moving there in 1959. Thomas' form in the 1961–62 season saw him score 30 league goals in 22 league games by Christmas 1961, and a total of 31 goals in 24 games in all competitions. Thomas' goalscoring record attracted attention from First Division clubs including Manchester United, Bolton Wanderers and Fulham. Leeds United had a bid of £30,000 rejected by the Scunthorpe United board of directors. However, Thomas was eventually sold to Newcastle United in January 1962 in a part-exchange deal, which saw John McGuigan moving in the opposite direction. Newcastle also paid Scunthorpe either £35,000, or £45,000. In his three seasons at Scunthorpe, Thomas scored 67 league goals in 91 league games. Thomas' exit had a detrimental effect on Scunthorpe United's season; attendances at their home matches fell by 20% after Thomas left, and the club dropped from 1st to 4th in the League. Thomas spent two years at Newcastle United, scoring 48 goals in 73 games, before returning to Scunthorpe in 1964. Thomas spent a further two years at Scunthorpe, scoring 26 goals in 52 games in his second spell with the club. Thomas' final club was Barnsley, where he scored 19 goals in 43 games over two years, before retiring in 1968 because of injury.
