= Sam Kemp =

English footballer

Personal information
- Full name: Samuel Patrick Kemp
- Date of birth: 29 August 1932
- Place of birth: Stockton-on-Tees, England
- Date of death: 1987 (aged 54–55)
- Height: 5 ft 9 in (1.75 m)
- Position: Winger

Senior career*
Years	Team	Apps	(Gls)
1951–1952	Whitby Town		
1952–1957	Sunderland	17	(2)
1957–1958	Sheffield United	16	(1)
1958	Mansfield Town	3	(1)
1958–1959	Gateshead	7	(1)
- * Club domestic league appearances and goals

Samuel Patrick Kemp (29 August 1932 – 1987) was an English professional footballer who played as a winger for Sunderland.
