= Dennis Uphill =

English footballer (1931–2007)

Personal information
- Full name: Edward Dennis Herbert Uphill
- Date of birth: 11 August 1931
- Place of birth: Bath, England
- Date of death: 7 February 2007 (aged 75)
- Place of death: Watford, England
- Position: Inside forward

Youth career
- ?–1949: Finchley

Senior career*
| Years | Team | Apps | (Gls) |
| 1949–1953 | Tottenham Hotspur | 6 | (2) |
| 1953–1955 | Reading | 92 | (42) |
| 1955–1956 | Coventry City | 49 | (16) |
| 1957–1958 | Mansfield Town | 83 | (38) |
| 1959–1960 | Watford | 51 | (30) |
| 1960–1963 | Crystal Palace | 63 | (17) |
| 1963–? | Rugby Town | ? | (?) |
- * Club domestic league appearances and goals

Edward Dennis Herbert Uphill (11 August 1931 – 7 February 2007) was an English footballer who played for Tottenham Hotspur, Reading, Coventry City, Mansfield Town, Watford and Crystal Palace. He also played non–league football for Rugby Town.

== Football career ==
Uphill signed as a professional for Spurs in September 1949 and made his Football League debut against Sunderland on 2 February 1950. He played a part in the push and run side of 1950–51 when he scored one goal and made two appearances in the position of inside forward. Uphill made a total of six appearances and scored twice between 1950 and 1953. Signed by Reading in an exchange deal which involved Johnny Brooks in February 1953 he went on to make 92 appearances and netting 42 goals for the club. Uphill joined Coventry City in October 1955 where he completed 49 appearances and scoring on 16 occasions. In March 1957, he transferred to Mansfield Town where he featured in 83 games and found the net 38 times. Uphill went on to join Watford in June 1959 and played in 51 matches and scoring 30 goals. He finished his senior career at Crystal Palace for whom he signed in October 1960 where he played 63 games and scored on 17 occasions. In 1963 he moved on to non–league football with Rugby Town.

== Later life and death ==
After retiring from the game through injury, he gained a turf accountants licence and ran a bookmakers business in Watford, before owning a removals company. He retired from work in 1995, but stood as a Conservative candidate in the Watford local council election. He died on 7 February 2007, aged 75, in Watford.
