= Terry Statham =

English footballer

Personal information
- Full name: Terence Statham
- Date of birth: 11 March 1940 (age 86)
- Place of birth: Shirebrook, England
- Position: Goalkeeper

Senior career*
Years	Team	Apps	(Gls)
1956–1960	Mansfield Town	26	(0)
Total		26	(0)
- * Club domestic league appearances and goals

Terence Statham (born 11 March 1940) is an English former professional footballer who played in the Football League for Mansfield Town.
