= Terry Swinscoe =

English footballer (1934–2026)

Personal information
- Full name: Terence Swinscoe
- Date of birth: 31 August 1934
- Place of birth: Shirebrook, England
- Date of death: 29 January 2026 (aged 91)
- Position: Full-back

Senior career*
Years	Team	Apps	(Gls)
1954–1955	Spalding United		
1955–1956	Stockport County	0	(0)
1956–1959	Mansfield Town	14	(0)
Total		14	(0)
- * Club domestic league appearances and goals

Terence Swinscoe (31 August 1934 – 29 January 2026) was an English professional footballer who played as a full-back in the Football League for Mansfield Town. He died on 29 January 2026, at the age of 91.
