= Robbie Anderson (footballer) =

English footballer

Personal information
- Full name: Robert John Anderson
- Date of birth: 23 February 1936
- Place of birth: Portsmouth, England
- Date of death: November 1996 (aged 60)
- Place of death: Sheffield, England
- Position: Winger

Senior career*
Years	Team	Apps	(Gls)
1955–1956	Chesterfield Tube Works		
1956–1960	Mansfield Town	40	(4)
1960	Halesowen Town		
1961	Telford United		
Total		40	(4)
- * Club domestic league appearances and goals

Robert John Anderson (23 February 1936 – November 1996) was an English professional footballer who played in the Football League for Mansfield Town.
