= Brian Jayes =

English footballer

Personal information
- Full name: Brian Jayes
- Date of birth: 13 December 1932
- Place of birth: Leicester, England
- Date of death: 12 January 1978 (aged 45)
- Place of death: England
- Position: Wing half

Senior career*
Years	Team	Apps	(Gls)
1955–1956	Leicester City	3	(0)
1956–1960	Mansfield Town	115	(1)
1960	Ramsgate Athletic		
1961	Wisbech Town		
1962	Rugby Town		
1963	Humberstone United		
Total		118	(1)
- * Club domestic league appearances and goals

Brian Jayes (13 December 1932 – 12 January 1978) was an English professional footballer who played in the Football League for Leicester City and Mansfield Town.
