= Sid Watson (footballer, born 1927) =

English footballer (1927–2021)

Personal information
- Full name: Thomas Sidney Watson
- Date of birth: 12 December 1927
- Place of birth: Mansfield, England
- Date of death: 1 September 2021 (aged 93)
- Position: Wing half

Youth career
- Palterton Welfare

Senior career*
Years	Team	Apps	(Gls)
1948–1961	Mansfield Town	292	(9)
1961–1965	Ilkeston Town		
- * Club domestic league appearances and goals

Thomas Sidney Watson (12 December 1927 – 1 September 2021) was an English footballer who played in The Football League for Mansfield Town as a wing-half.

Sid Watson worked at Pleasley Colliery when he signed with Mansfield Town as an amateur in September 1948. In January 1950, he signed a professional contract with the club, but had to wait until the 1951–52 season before making his first-team debut.

Watson went on to become one of Mansfield's longest-serving players of all time. He spent 13 years at the club, and played 307 first-team games for the Stags, including 292 in league competition. He left Mansfield at the end of the 1960–61 season, and then played four seasons for non-league Ilkeston Town.

After his retirement from professional football, Watson was an employee at King's Mill Hospital in Sutton-in-Ashfield until his retirement in 1992.

He died on 1 September 2021, aged 93.
