= 1978–79 Mansfield Town F.C. season =

Mansfield Town
1978–79 season
- Manager: Billy Bingham
- Stadium: Field Mill
- Third Division: 18th
- FA Cup: First Round
- League Cup: First Round
- Anglo-Scottish Cup: Semi-final

The 1978–79 season was Mansfield Town's 42nd season in the Football League and 14th in the Third Division they finished in 18th position with 43 points.

== Final league table ==
Pos	Team	Pld	W	D	L	GF	GA	GD	Pts
16	Chester	46	14	16	16	57	61	−4	44
17	Rotherham United	46	17	10	19	49	55	−6	44
18	Mansfield Town	46	12	19	15	51	52	−1	43
19	Bury	46	11	20	15	59	65	−6	42
20	Chesterfield	46	13	14	19	51	65	−14	40

Source: rsssf.com

== Results ==
=== Football League Third Division ===
Match	Date	Opponent	Venue	Result	Attendance	Scorers
1	19 August 1978	Exeter City	A	0–0	3,704	
2	21 August 1978	Gillingham	H	1–1	5,802	Bird
3	26 August 1978	Southend United	H	1–1	5,276	Goodwin
4	2 September 1978	Swindon Town	A	0–1	6,407	
5	9 September 1978	Plymouth Argyle	H	4–1	6,052	Syrett, Martin, Saxby, Miller
6	16 September 1978	Sheffield Wednesday	H	1–1	11,365	Goodwin
7	23 September 1978	Rotherham United	A	0–2	5,350	
8	27 September 1978	Oxford United	A	2–3	4,266	Bird, Allen
9	30 September 1978	Carlisle United	H	1–0	4,716	Miller
10	7 October 1978	Shrewsbury Town	A	2–2	4,338	Bird, Moss
11	14 October 1978	Walsall	H	1–3	6,036	Martin
12	17 October 1978	Swansea City	A	2–3	10,975	Allen, Goodwin
13	21 October 1978	Blackpool	A	0–2	6,633	
14	28 October 1978	Colchester United	H	1–1	4,525	Moss
15	4 November 1978	Lincoln City	A	1–0	3,644	Martin
16	11 November 1978	Swindon Town	H	0–1	4,721	
17	13 November 1978	Tranmere Rovers	H	0–0	3,929	
18	17 November 1978	Southend United	A	1–1	7,416	Syrett
19	2 December 1978	Watford	A	1–1	10,568	Goodwin
20	9 December 1978	Brentford	H	2–1	4,003	Curtis, McClelland
21	23 December 1978	Peterborough United	H	1–1	3,671	Green (o.g.)
22	26 December 1978	Hull City	A	0–3	4,706	
23	30 December 1978	Bury	A	0–0	4,009	
24	10 February 1979	Carlisle United	A	0–1	4,896	
25	24 February 1979	Walsall	A	1–1	4,157	Bird
26	3 March 1979	Blackpool	H	1–1	4,829	Curtis
27	9 March 1979	Colchester United	A	0–1	2,866	
28	12 March 1979	Plymouth Argyle	H	5–0	4,325	Carter (2), Syrett (2), Hamilton
29	24 March 1979	Gillingham	A	0–0	9,935	
30	26 March 1979	Exeter City	H	1–1	4,562	Allen
31	31 March 1979	Chester	H	1–1	2,358	Austin
32	3 April 1979	Sheffield Wednesday	A	2–1	11,231	Austin, Saxby
33	7 April 1979	Watford	H	0–3	7,944	
34	14 April 1979	Hull City	H	0–2	5,138	
35	16 April 1979	Chesterfield	A	0–1	4,931	
36	17 April 1979	Peterborough United	A	2–1	4,178	Austin, Miller
37	21 April 1979	Bury	H	3–0	3,976	Carter, Curtis, Forrest (o.g.)
38	23 April 1979	Swansea City	H	2–2	6,426	Allen, Curtis
39	28 April 1979	Brentford	A	0–1	6,838	
40	30 April 1979	Tranmere Rovers	A	2–1	1,121	Carter, Saxby
41	5 May 1979	Chester	H	2–0	4,173	Austin, Curtis
42	7 May 1979	Shrewsbury Town	H	2–2	6,413	Austin, Curtis
43	11 May 1979	Lincoln City	H	2–0	4,386	Austin, Saxby
44	14 May 1979	Oxford United	H	1–1	4,138	Miller
45	19 May 1979	Rotherham United	H	0–1	3,971	
46	21 May 1979	Chesterfield	H	2–1	4,159	Saxby, Tartt (o.g.)

=== FA Cup ===
Round	Date	Opponent	Venue	Result	Attendance	Scorers
R1	25 November 1978	Shrewsbury Town	H	0–2	4,881	

=== League Cup ===
Round	Date	Opponent	Venue	Result	Attendance	Scorers
R1 1st leg	12 August 1978	Darlington	H	0–1	4,903	
R1 2nd leg	15 August 1978	Darlington	A	2–2	5,000	Bird, Miller

=== Anglo-Scottish Cup ===
Round	Date	Opponent	Venue	Result	Attendance	Scorers
PR	31 July 1978	Notts County	H	1–0	5,107	Syrett
PR	5 August 1978	Leyton Orient	A	1–0	3,385	Syrett
PR	9 August 1978	Norwich City	A	1–1	3,771	Syrett
QF 1st leg	13 September 1978	Partick Thistle	A	0–1	2,000	
QF 2nd leg	3 October 1978	Partick Thistle	H	3–2 (4–2 pens)	5,287	G Saxby, Goodwin (2)
SF 1st leg	31 October 1978	Burnley	H	1–2	5,517	Goodwin
SF 2nd leg	7 November 1978	Burnley	A	1–0 (3–4 pens)	6,817	Syrett

== Squad statistics ==
- Squad list sourced from 1978–79 Mansfield Town F.C. season at the English National Football Archive (subscription required)

Pos.	Name	League		FA Cup		League Cup		Anglo-Scottish Cup		Total	
Pos.	Name	Apps	Goals	Apps	Goals	Apps	Goals	Apps	Goals	Apps	Goals
GK	(England) Rod Arnold	28	0	1	0	2	0	7	0	38	0
GK	(England) Martin New	18	0	0	0	0	0	0	0	18	0
DF	(England) Kevin Bird	44	4	1	0	2	1	7	0	54	5
DF	(England) Bob Curtis	33(1)	6	1	0	0	0	2	0	36(1)	6
DF	(England) Derek Dawkins	26	0	0	0	0	0	0	0	26	0
DF	(England) Barry Foster	39	0	1	0	2	0	6	0	48	0
DF	(England) Colin Foster	9(4)	0	0	0	2	0	3(1)	0	14(5)	0
DF	(Northern Ireland) John McClelland	33(3)	1	1	0	2	0	7	0	43(3)	1
DF	(England) Ian Phillips	3(2)	0	0	0	0	0	1(1)	0	4(3)	0
DF	(England) Mick Saxby	46	4	1	0	2	0	7	0	56	4
DF	(England) Ian Wood	6(11)	0	1	0	0	0	1	0	8(11)	0
MF	(England) Mike Coffey	2(1)	0	0	0	1(1)	0	0(3)	0	3(5)	0
MF	(England) Neville Hamilton	16(2)	1	0	0	0	0	0	0	16(2)	1
MF	(England) Gordon Hodgson	6	0	0	0	2	0	4	0	12	0
MF	(England) Gary Saxby	14(2)	1	0	0	0	0	2	1	16(2)	2
FW	(England) Russell Allen	26(10)	5	1	0	1(1)	0	2(1)	0	30(10)	5
FW	(England) Terry Austin	16	5	0	0	0	0	0	0	16	5
FW	(England) Michael Carter	18	4	0	0	0	0	0	0	18	4
FW	(England) Dave Goodwin	26(1)	4	1	0	0	0	5	3	32(1)	7
FW	(Northern Ireland) Jimmy Grattan	1	0	0	0	0	0	0	0	1	0
FW	(England) Dennis Martin	33	3	0	0	2	0	7	0	42	3
FW	(England) Johnny Miller	28(3)	4	1	0	2	1	7	0	38(3)	5
FW	(England) Ernie Moss	12(1)	2	0	0	0	0	2	0	14(1)	2
FW	(England) Dave Syrett	23	4	1	0	2	0	7	4	33	8
–	Own goals	–	3	–	0	–	0	–	0	–	3
