= 1977–78 Mansfield Town F.C. season =

Mansfield Town
1977–78 season
- Manager: Peter Morris; Billy Bingham
- Stadium: Field Mill
- Second Division: 21st
- FA Cup: Fourth Round
- League Cup: Fifth Round
- Top goalscorer: Dave Syrett (16)

The 1977–78 season was Mansfield Town's 41st season in the Football League and their first in the Second Division. They finished in 21st position with 31 points, seven points from safety. It remains to date their only season in the second tier of English football.

== Final league table ==
Pos	Team	Pld	W	D	L	GF	GA	GD	Pts	Relegation
18	Bristol Rovers	42	13	12	17	61	77	−16	38	
19	Cardiff City	42	13	12	17	51	71	−20	38	
20	Blackpool (R)	42	12	13	17	59	60	−1	37	Relegation to the Third Division
21	Mansfield Town (R)	42	10	11	21	49	69	−20	31	Relegation to the Third Division
22	Hull City (R)	42	8	12	22	34	52	−18	28	Relegation to the Third Division

Rules for classification: 1) Points; 2) Goal difference; 3) Goals scored
(R) Relegated

== Results ==
=== Football League Second Division ===
Match	Date	Opponent	Venue	Result	Attendance	Scorers
1	20 August 1977	Stoke City	H	2–1	14,078	Syrett, Sharkey
2	23 August 1977	Crystal Palace	A	1–3	19,019	Syrett
3	27 August 1977	Southampton	A	0–1	15,981	
4	3 September 1977	Brighton & Hove Albion	H	1–2	8,665	Syrett
5	10 September 1977	Millwall	H	0–0	7,661	
6	17 September 1977	Cardiff City	A	1–1	6,848	Moss
7	24 September 1977	Burnley	H	4–1	8,274	Moss, Syrett, Sharkey, Hodgson
8	1 October 1977	Hull City	A	2–0	6,263	Moss (2)
9	4 October 1977	Bristol Rovers	A	1–3	4,980	Moss
10	8 October 1977	Sheffield United	H	1–1	14,268	Aston
11	15 October 1977	Bolton Wanderers	A	0–2	20,655	
12	22 October 1977	Sunderland	H	1–2	12,825	Syrett
13	29 October 1977	Notts County	H	1–3	11,237	Bird
14	5 November 1977	Charlton Athletic	A	2–2	9,046	Syrett, Moss
15	12 November 1977	Luton Town	H	3–1	7,519	Syrett, Sharkey, Miller
16	19 November 1977	Blackburn Rovers	H	1–3	8,796	Sharkey
17	26 November 1977	Oldham Athletic	H	0–2	7,301	
18	3 December 1977	Leyton Orient	A	2–4	4,427	Bird, Miller
19	10 December 1977	Blackpool	H	1–3	6,981	Sharkey
20	17 December 1977	Luton Town	A	1–1	6,401	Syrett
21	26 December 1977	Fulham	H	2–1	8,456	Bird, Foster
22	27 December 1977	Tottenham Hotspur	A	1–1	36,288	Bird
23	31 December 1977	Crystal Palace	H	1–3	9,291	Aston
24	2 January 1978	Stoke City	A	1–1	13,834	Goodwin
25	14 January 1978	Southampton	H	1–2	8,672	Syrett
26	21 January 1978	Brighton & Hove Albion	A	1–5	22,647	O'Sullivan (o.g.)
27	11 February 1978	Cardiff City	H	2–2	6,548	Hodgson, Wood
28	25 February 1978	Hull City	H	1–0	7,379	Foster
29	4 March 1978	Sheffield United	A	0–2	14,916	
30	11 March 1978	Bolton Wanderers	H	0–1	12,329	
31	14 March 1978	Burnley	A	0–2	9,893	
32	18 March 1978	Sunderland	A	0–1	14,033	
33	21 March 1978	Notts County	A	0–1	10,587	
34	25 March 1978	Tottenham Hotspur	H	3–3	12,144	Syrett (3)
35	27 March 1978	Fulham	A	2–0	7,088	Syrett, Foster
36	1 April 1978	Charlton Athletic	H	0–3	6,691	
37	8 April 1978	Oldham Athletic	A	1–0	7,225	Miller
38	15 April 1978	Blackburn Rovers	H	2–2	5,859	Syrett (2)
39	22 April 1978	Blackpool	A	2–1	5,376	Syrett, Miller
40	24 April 1978	Bristol Rovers	H	3–0	6,122	Aston (2), Miller
41	29 April 1978	Leyton Orient	H	1–1	6,337	Pate
42	2 May 1978	Millwall	A	0–1	9,243	

=== FA Cup ===
Round	Date	Opponent	Venue	Result	Attendance	Scorers
R3	7 January 1978	Plymouth Argyle	H	1–0	7,402	Miller
R4	6 February 1978	Bolton Wanderers	A	0–1	23,830	

=== League Cup ===
Round	Date	Opponent	Venue	Result	Attendance	Scorers
R1 1st leg	13 August 1977	Lincoln City	H	0–1	6,735	
R1 2nd leg	17 August 1977	Lincoln City	A	0–0	5,761	

== Squad statistics ==
- Squad list sourced from 1977–78 Mansfield Town F.C. season at the English National Football Archive (subscription required)

Pos.	Name	League		FA Cup		League Cup		Total	
Pos.	Name	Apps	Goals	Apps	Goals	Apps	Goals	Apps	Goals
GK	(England) Rod Arnold	42	0	2	0	2	0	46	0
DF	(England) Kevin Bird	34	4	0	0	2	0	36	4
DF	(England) Bob Curtis	5	0	0	0	0	0	5	0
DF	(England) Barry Foster	25	0	2	0	0	0	27	0
DF	(England) Colin Foster	35	3	2	0	2	0	39	3
DF	(England) Ian MacKenzie	5	0	0	0	2	0	7	0
DF	(Scotland) Sandy Pate	9	1	1	0	0	0	10	1
DF	(England) Ian Phillips	15(3)	0	1(1)	0	0	0	16(4)	0
DF	(England) Mick Saxby	19(2)	0	0(2)	0	0	0	19(4)	0
DF	(England) Ian Wood	36	1	2	0	2	0	40	1
MF	(England) Gordon Hodgson	42	2	2	0	2	0	46	2
MF	(England) Paul Matthews	4	0	0	0	2	0	6	0
MF	(England) Ian McDonald	0	0	0	0	0(1)	0	0(1)	0
MF	(Scotland) Billy McEwan	9	0	0	0	2	0	11	0
MF	(England) Peter Morris	9	0	1	0	0	0	10	0
MF	(Northern Ireland) Pat Sharkey	31(1)	5	2	0	0	0	33(1)	5
FW	(England) John Aston	24(7)	4	1	0	0	0	25(7)	4
FW	(England) Robbie Cooke	4(2)	0	0	0	0	0	4(2)	0
FW	(England) Dave Goodwin	12(3)	1	2	0	0	0	14(3)	1
FW	(England) Dennis Martin	13	0	0	0	0	0	13	0
FW	(England) Johnny Miller	32	5	2	1	2	0	36	6
FW	(England) Ernie Moss	15	6	0	0	2	0	17	6
FW	(England) Kevin Randall	0(4)	0	0	0	0	0	0(4)	0
FW	(England) Dave Syrett	42	16	2	0	2	0	46	16
–	Own goals	–	1	–	0	–	0	–	1
