= List of Mansfield Town F.C. seasons =

Mansfield Town Football Club is an English association football club based in the Nottinghamshire town of Mansfield. Founded in 1897 as Mansfield Wesleyans, the team first entered the Mansfield & District Amateur League in 1902. Four years later, the club turned professional, tweaked its name to Mansfield Wesley, and joined the Notts & District League. The team made their debut in the FA Cup in 1909–10, and joined the Central Alliance in 1911, by which time the club had adopted its current name of Mansfield Town. In the first post-First World War season, they moved to the Field Mill ground and won the Central Alliance title, and in 1921, they were accepted into the Midland League. Three years later, they won the Midland League title, repeated the feat the following year, and were runners-up the next. Applications for election to the Football League were unsuccessful, but in the hope of a better class of football, they had one season in the Midland Combination, primarily a reserve league for Football League clubs, before returning to the Midland League. In 1928–29, Mansfield won the Midland League title by a nine-point margin and beat two Football League clubs on the way to their first appearance in the fourth round of the FA Cup, in which they lost 2–0 to Arsenal at Highbury.

Geographically, Mansfield lay on the border between the catchment areas of the Northern and Southern sections of the regionalised Third Division of the League. They had previously applied for election to the Northern Section; for the 1931–32 season, they applied to the Southern Section, and were admitted. After one season, in which they struggled, the team was reallocated to the Northern Section, before returning to the Southern in 1937. Competitive football was suspended for the duration of the Second World War. Mansfield finished 22nd and bottom in the first post-war season, and thus had to apply for re-election to the League. The management committee decided that in light of the difficult circumstances facing all clubs in resuming competitive professional football after the war, all clubs facing re-election should be accepted unopposed. Mansfield were transferred to the Northern Section for 1947–48. Three seasons later, they finished runners-up – at that time, only the champions were promoted – and reached the fifth round (last 16) of the FA Cup for the first time, losing to First Division team and eventual cup finalists Blackpool. Against a background of financial and governance problems that brought the club close to bankruptcy, Mansfield remained in the Northern Section until the regional sections were amalgamated into national Third and Fourth Divisions in 1958, when they were placed in the Third Division.

Two years later, Mansfield were relegated for the first time in their history. In their third season in the fourth tier, they finished fourth and were promoted on goal average, ahead of Gillingham by 0.118 of a goal. After a further nine years in the Third – during which time they reached the 1968–69 FA Cup quarter-final, which remains their best achievement in the competition – and three in the Fourth Divisions, Mansfield won their first title at Football League level, taking the 1974–75 Fourth Division by a six-point margin. A season of consolidation, whose highlights included progressing to the quarter-final of the League Cup and the first of two Anglo-Scottish Cup semi-finals, preceded another championship: the 1976–77 Third Division title gained Mansfield promotion to the Football League Second Division for the first and as yet only time. They could not maintain that status, and for the next thirty years continued to drift between third and fourth tiers, during which time they won the 1986–87 Associate Members' Cup, a cup competition open to teams from the lowest two tiers of the League; Mansfield beat Bristol City in a penalty shoot-out in the final. In 2007–08, they finished 23rd in the fourth tier and were relegated out of the Football League into the Conference National (promotion and relegation between League and Conference had replaced re-election in 1987). They reached the final of the 2010–11 FA Trophy, losing to Darlington in the last minute of extra time, before returning to the League as Conference champions in 2013. After two play-off failures in the next ten seasons, Mansfield gained automatic promotion to League One via a third-place finish in the 2023–24 season.

Since their admission to the Football League, Mansfield Town have spent 1 season in the second tier of the English football league system, 42 in the third, 38 in the fourth, and 5 in the top tier of non-league football. The table details the team's achievements in senior first-team competitions and their top league goalscorers (where known) from their debut season in the Mansfield & District Amateur League in 1902–03 to the end of the most recently completed season.

== Key ==
Key to league record:

- Pld – Matches played
- W – Matches won
- D – Matches drawn
- L – Matches lost
- GF – Goals for
- GA – Goals against
- Pts – Points
- Pos – Final position

Key to colours and symbols:
Symbol	Meaning
1st or W	Winners
2nd or F	Runners-up
↑	Promoted
↓	Relegated
♦	Top league scorer in Mansfield Town's division

Key to divisions:

- M&D Am – Mansfield & District Amateur League
- Notts – Notts & District League
- Cent All – Central Alliance
- Notts/Derbys – Notts & Derbyshire League
- Yorks – Yorkshire Football League
- Div 2 – Football League Second Division
- Div 3 – Football League Third Division
- Div 4 – Football League Fourth Division
- League 1 – EFL League One
- League 2 – EFL League Two

Key to rounds:

- Group – Group stage
- Prelim – Preliminary round
- QR1 – First qualifying round
- QR2 – Second qualifying round, etc.
- Inter – Intermediate round (between qualifying rounds and rounds proper)
- R1 – First round
- R2 – Second round, etc.
- QF – Quarter-final
- SF – Semi-final
- F – Final
- W – Winners
- (N) – Northern section of regionalised competition
- (S) – Southern section of regionalised competition

Details of the abandoned 1939–40 Football League season are shown in italics and appropriately footnoted.

== Seasons ==
Season	League									FA Cup	League Cup	Other		Top league scorer(s)	
Season	Division (Note: From the 1931–32 Football League season onwards, divisions are sorted according to their level within the English football league system, and separately from the pre-League divisions.)	Pld	W	D	L	GF	GA	Pts	Pos	FA Cup	League Cup	Competition	Result	Player(s)	Goals
1902–03	M&D Am								7th	—	—	—	—	Not known	—
1903–04	M&D Am								3rd (Note: Two points deducted for fielding an ineligible player.)	—	—	—	—	Not known	—
1904–05	M&D Am								5th	—	—	—	—	Not known	—
1905–06	M&D Am								3rd	—	—	—	—	Not known	—
1906–07	Notts								6th	—	—	—	—	Not known	—
1907–08	Notts								5th	—	—	—	—	Not known	—
1908–09	Notts/Derbys	36	19	6	11	95	73	44	4th	—	—	—	—	Jack Needham	46
1909–10	Notts/Derbys	34	6	7	21	35	81	17	17th	QR2	—	—	—	Not known	—
1910–11	Notts/Derbys	34	15	6	13	66	58	36	9th	QR4	—	—	—	Not known	—
1911–12	Cent All	22	6	0	16	35	62	12	11th	QR1	—	—	—	Not known	—
1912–13	Cent All	32	13	2	17	50	54	28	10th (Note: The goals against figure of 64 in the NonLeague Matters source is a typo; all contemporary newspapers have 54, and tables published for matchdays before the final table are consistent with that figure.)	QR3	—	—	—	Fred Blacknell	39 ♦
1913–14	Cent All	30	6	7	17	38	62	19	15th	QR2	—	—	—	Not known	—
1914–15	Notts/Derbys	26	12	4	10	52	56	28	4th	Prelim	—	—	—	Not known	—
1915–19	Competitive league and FA Cup football was suspended until after the First World War.														
1919–20	Cent All	30	19	3	8	81	41	41	1st	Prelim	—	—	—	Not known	—
1920–21	Cent All	34	18	6	10	75	56	42	5th	QR5	—	—	—	Not known	—
1921–22	Midland	42	20	7	15	68	57	47	8th	QR5	—	—	—	Not known	—
1922–23	Midland	42	17	6	19	79	64	40	13th	QR6	—	—	—	Not known	—
1923–24	Midland	42	31	6	5	98	31	68	1st	QR6	—	—	—	Not known	—
1924–25	Midland	28	20	4	4	82	27	44	1st	QR4	—	—	—	Not known	—
1925–26	Midland	40	23	7	10	120	54	53	2nd	R1	—	—	—	Not known	—
1926–27	Mid Comb	24	15	6	3	62	28	36	2nd	R2	—	—	—	Not known	—
1927–28	Midland	44	19	11	14	118	97	49	10th	QR4	—	—	—	Not known	—
1928–29	Midland	50	31	10	9	133	72	72	1st	R4	—	—	—	Not known	—
1929–30	Midland	50	25	4	21	126	98	54	10th	R1	—	—	—	Not known	—
1930–31	Midland ↑	46	19	11	16	103	95	49	10th	R1	—	—	—	Not known	—
1931–32	Div 3S	42	11	10	21	75	108	32	20th	R1	—	—	—	Harry Johnson	32
1932–33	Div 3N	42	14	7	21	84	100	35	16th	R1	—	—	—	Harry Johnson	30
1933–34	Div 3N	42	11	12	19	81	88	34	17th	R1	—	Third Division North Cup	SF	Harry Johnson	18
1934–35	Div 3N	42	19	9	14	75	62	47	8th	R3	—	Third Division North Cup	R1	Harry Johnson	17
1935–36	Div 3N	42	14	9	19	80	91	37	19th	R1	—	Third Division North Cup	R1	Ted Harston	26
1936–37	Div 3N	42	18	8	16	91	76	44	9th	R2	—	Third Division North Cup	R1	Ted Harston	55 ♦
1937–38	Div 3S	42	15	9	18	62	67	39	14th	R3	—	Third Division South Cup	R1	Harold Crawshaw	25 ♦
1938–39	Div 3S	42	12	15	15	44	62	39	16th	R2	—	Third Division South Cup	R2	Tommy Dutton	12
1939–40	Div 3S	3	1	1	1	8	8	3	(Note: The 1939–40 season was abandoned with three matches played when the Second World War began.)	—	—	—	—	Wally Akers; Tommy Ward	3
1939–45	The Football League and FA Cup were suspended until after the Second World War.														
1945–46	—	—	—	—	—	—	—	—	—	R3 (Note: Although the Football League did not resume until the 1946–47 season, the FA Cup was contested in 1945–46. From the first round proper to the sixth round (quarter-final), results were determined on aggregate score over two legs.)	—	—	—	—	—
1946–47	Div 3S	42	9	10	23	48	96	28	22nd (Note: All clubs facing re-election, which included Mansfield, were accepted unopposed, in recognition of the circumstances.)	R1	—	—	—	Eric Bryant	15
1947–48	Div 3N	42	17	11	14	57	51	45	8th	R3	—	—	—	George Banks	14
1948–49	Div 3N	42	14	14	14	52	48	42	10th	R3	—	—	—	Harry Oscroft	14
1949–50	Div 3N	42	18	12	12	66	54	48	8th	R2	—	—	—	Freddie Steele	18
1950–51	Div 3N	46	26	12	8	78	48	64	2nd	R5	—	—	—	Billy Coole	16
1951–52	Div 3N	46	22	8	16	73	60	52	6th	R1	—	—	—	Ken Reeve	21
1952–53	Div 3N	46	16	14	16	55	62	46	18th	R3	—	—	—	Chris Marron	16
1953–54	Div 3N	46	20	11	15	88	67	51	7th	R1	—	—	—	Ken Murray	21
1954–55	Div 3N	46	18	9	19	65	71	45	13th	R1	—	—	—	Ken Murray	13
1955–56	Div 3N	46	14	11	21	84	81	39	18th	R2	—	—	—	Barry Jepson	22
1956–57	Div 3N	46	17	10	19	91	90	44	16th	R1	—	—	—	George Darwin	19
1957–58	Div 3N	46	22	8	16	100	92	52	6th	R3	—	—	—	Barrie Thomas	23
1958–59	Div 3	46	14	13	19	73	98	41	20th	R1	—	—	—	Barrie Thomas	21
1959–60	Div 3 ↓	46	15	6	25	81	112	36	22nd	R3	—	—	—	Arthur Fitzsimons; Ivan Hollett	15
1960–61	Div 4	46	16	6	24	71	78	38	20th	R2	R1 (Note: The Football League Cup competition started in the 1960–61 season.)	—	—	Doug Wragg	11
1961–62	Div 4	44	19	6	19	77	66	44	14th	R2	R2	—	—	Roy Chapman	20
1962–63	Div 4 ↑	46	24	9	13	108	69	57	4th	R3	R2	—	—	Ken Wagstaff	34 ♦
1963–64	Div 3	46	20	11	15	76	62	51	7th	R1	R2	—	—	Ken Wagstaff	29
1964–65	Div 3	46	24	11	11	95	61	59	3rd	R2	R3	—	—	Harry Middleton	16
1965–66	Div 3	46	15	8	23	59	89	38	19th	R1	R3	—	—	Bill Curry	14
1966–67	Div 3	46	20	9	17	84	79	49	19th	R4	R2	—	—	Bill Curry	22
1967–68	Div 3	46	12	13	21	51	67	37	20th	R1	R1	—	—	Dai Jones	8
1968–69	Div 3	46	16	11	19	58	62	43	15th	QF	R1	—	—	Nick Sharkey	13
1969–70	Div 3	46	21	11	14	70	49	53	6th	R5	R2	—	—	Dudley Roberts	18
1970–71	Div 3	46	18	15	13	64	62	51	7th	R2	R2	—	—	Dudley Roberts	22 ♦
1971–72	Div 3 ↓	46	8	20	18	41	63	36	21st	R2	R1	—	—	John Fairbrother	18
1972–73	Div 4	46	20	14	12	78	51	54	6th	R1	R2	—	—	John Fairbrother	20
1973–74	Div 4	46	13	17	16	62	69	43	17th	R2	R1	—	—	Terry Eccles	20
1974–75	Div 4 ↑	46	28	12	6	90	40	68	1st	R5	R1	—	—	Ray Clarke	28 ♦
1975–76	Div 3	46	16	15	15	58	52	47	11th	R2	QF	Anglo-Scottish Cup	SF	Ray Clarke	24
1976–77	Div 3 ↑	46	28	8	10	78	42	64	1st	R2	R1	—	—	Kevin Randall	17
1977–78	Div 2 ↓	42	10	11	21	49	69	31	21st	R4	R1	—	—	Dave Syrett	16
1978–79	Div 3	46	12	19	15	51	52	43	18th	R1	R1	Anglo-Scottish Cup	SF	Bob Curtis	6
1979–80	Div 3 ↓	46	10	16	20	47	58	36	23rd	R3	R3	—	—	Terry Austin	19
1980–81	Div 4	46	20	9	17	58	44	49	7th	R3	R2	—	—	Russell Allen	9
1981–82	Div 4	46	13	10	23	63	81	47 (Note: The 1981–82 season saw the introduction of three points for a win instead of two. Mansfield had two points deducted for fielding an ineligible player.)	20th	R1	R2	—	—	Jim Lumby	14
1982–83	Div 4	46	16	13	17	61	70	61	10th	R2	R1	Football League Group Cup	Group	John Dungworth	14
1983–84	Div 4	46	13	13	20	66	70	52	19th	R2	R1	Associate Members' Cup	R1(N)	Dave Caldwell	21
1984–85	Div 4	46	13	18	15	41	38	57	14th	R2	R1	Associate Members' Cup	F(N)	Dave Caldwell	9
1985–86	Div 4 ↑	46	23	12	11	74	47	81	3rd	R1	R2	Associate Members' Cup	QF(N)	Neville Chamberlain	16
1986–87	Div 3	46	15	16	15	52	55	61	10th	R1	R1	Associate Members' Cup	W (Note: Beat Bristol City in the final at Wembley in a penalty shoot-out.)	Keith Cassells	16
1987–88	Div 3	46	14	12	20	48	59	54	19th	R4	R2	Associate Members' Cup	QF(N)	Steve Charles	12
1988–89	Div 3	46	14	17	15	48	52	59	15th	R1	R1	Associate Members' Cup	Prelim(S)	Keith Cassells	14
1989–90	Div 3	46	16	7	23	50	65	55	15th	R1	R2	Associate Members' Cup	R1(S)	Steve Wilkinson	15
1990–91	Div 3 ↓	46	8	14	24	42	63	38	24th	R3	R1	Associate Members' Cup	QF(S)	Steve Wilkinson	11
1991–92	Div 4 ↑ (Note: When the newly formed FA Premier League split from the Football League, the remaining divisions of the Football League were renumbered upwards, so Mansfield were promoted from Division Four to Division Two.)	42	23	8	11	75	53	77	3rd	R1	R1	Associate Members' Cup	Prelim(S)	Phil Stant	26 ♦
1992–93	Div 2 ↓	46	11	11	24	52	80	44	22nd	R1	R1	Football League Trophy	R1(S)	Steve Wilkinson	11
1993–94	Div 3	42	15	10	17	53	62	55	12th	R1	R1	Football League Trophy	QF(N)	Steve Wilkinson	11
1994–95	Div 3	42	18	11	13	84	59	65	6th	R3	R2	Football League Trophy	R1(N)	Steve Wilkinson	22
1995–96	Div 3	46	11	20	15	54	64	53	19th	R2	R1	Football League Trophy	R1(N)	Stewart Hadley; Mark Sale	7
1996–97	Div 3	46	16	16	14	47	45	64	11th	R2	R1	Football League Trophy	R2(N)	John Doolan	6
1997–98	Div 3	46	16	17	13	64	55	65	12th	R1	R1	Football League Trophy	QF(N)	Steve Whitehall	24
1998–99	Div 3	46	19	10	17	60	58	67	8th	R2	R1	Football League Trophy	R2(N)	Lee Peacock	17
1999–2000	Div 3	46	16	8	22	50	65	56	17th	R1	R1	Football League Trophy	R2(N)	Chris Greenacre	9
2000–01	Div 3	46	15	13	18	64	72	58	13th	R1	R2	Football League Trophy	R1(N)	Chris Greenacre	19
2001–02	Div 3 ↑	46	24	7	15	72	60	79	3rd	R3	R1	Football League Trophy	R2(N)	Chris Greenacre	21
2002–03	Div 2 ↓	46	12	8	26	66	97	44	23rd	R2	R1	Football League Trophy	R1(N)	Iyseden Christie	18
2003–04	Div 3	46	22	9	15	76	62	75	5th (Note: After defeating Northampton Town on penalties in the semifinal of the play-offs, Mansfield lost to Huddersfield Town, also on penalties, in the final.)	R3	R1	Football League Trophy	R1(N)	Liam Lawrence	19
2004–05	League 2 (Note: From the 2004–05 season, the Football League divisions were rebranded: Division One was renamed the Football League Championship, and Divisions Two and Three became Football League One and Football League Two respectively.)	46	15	15	16	56	56	60	13th	R1	R1	Football League Trophy	R2(N)	Colin Larkin	11
2005–06	League 2	46	13	15	18	59	66	54	16th	R3	R3	Football League Trophy	R1(N)	Richie Barker	18
2006–07	League 2	46	14	12	20	58	63	54	17th	R3	R2	Football League Trophy	QF(N)	Richie Barker	12
2007–08	League 2 ↓	46	11	9	26	48	68	42	23rd	R4	R1	Football League Trophy	R1(N)	Michael Boulding	22
2008–09	Conf	46	19	9	18	57	55	62 (Note: Four points deducted for fielding ineligible players.)	12th	R1	—	FA Trophy	R1	Rob Duffy	9
2009–10	Conf	44	17	11	16	69	60	62	9th	R1	—	FA Trophy	R1	Jake Speight	17
2010–11	Conf	46	17	10	19	73	75	61	12th	R1	—	FA Trophy	F (Note: Lost 1–0 to Darlington in the final; the goal was scored in the last minute of extra time.)	Louis Briscoe	13
2011–12	Conf	46	25	14	7	87	48	89	3rd (Note: Lost 2–1 on aggregate to York City after extra time in the play-off semi-final.)	QR4	—	FA Trophy	R1	Matt Green	29
2012–13	Conf ↑	46	30	5	11	92	52	95	1st	R3	—	FA Trophy	R1	Matt Green	25 ♦
2013–14	League 2	46	15	15	16	49	58	60	11th	R2	R1	Football League Trophy	R2(N)	Sam Clucas	8
2014–15	League 2	46	13	9	24	38	62	48	21st	R2	R1	Football League Trophy	R1(N)	Vadaine Oliver	7
2015–16	League 2	46	17	13	16	61	53	64	12th	R1	R1	Football League Trophy	R1(N)	Matt Green	16
2016–17	League 2	46	17	15	14	54	50	66	12th	R1	R1	EFL Trophy	QF	Matt Green	10
2017–18	League 2	46	18	18	10	67	52	72	8th	R3	R1	EFL Trophy	R2	Kane Hemmings	15
2018–19	League 2	46	20	16	10	69	41	76	4th (Note: Lost on penalties to Newport County in the play-off semi-final.)	R1	R2	EFL Trophy	R2	Tyler Walker	22
2019–20	League 2	36	9	11	16	48	55	38	21st (Note: The 2019–20 football season was disrupted by the effects of the COVID-19 pandemic. The EFL was suspended in March 2020 and in June, the League Two clubs voted to end the regular season programme early. Teams had not all played the same number of matches, so it was agreed to construct final league tables on a points-per-game basis. Mansfield Town's 48.56 points per game placed them 21st.)	R2	R1	EFL Trophy	R2	Nicky Maynard	14
2020–21	League 2	46	13	19	14	57	55	58	16th	R3	R1	EFL Trophy	Group	Jordan Bowery	10
2021–22	League 2	46	22	11	13	67	52	77	7th (Note: After defeating Northampton Town on aggregate in the play-off semifinal, Mansfield lost 3–0 to Port Vale in the final.)	R3	R1	EFL Trophy	Group	Rhys Oates	9
2022–23	League 2	46	21	12	13	72	55	75	8th	R3	R1	EFL Trophy	R2	Will Swan	10
2023–24	League 2 ↑	46	24	14	8	90	47	86	3rd	R1	R4	EFL Trophy	Group	Davis Keillor-Dunn	22
2024–25	League 1	46	15	9	22	60	73	54	17th	R3	R1	EFL Trophy	Group	Will Evans	14
2025–26	League 1	46	16	17	13	62	50	65	10th	R5	R2	EFL Trophy	Group	Lucas Akins	9
