= 1979–80 Mansfield Town F.C. season =

Mansfield Town
1979–80 season
- Manager: Mick Jones
- Stadium: Field Mill
- Third Division: 23rd
- FA Cup: Third Round
- League Cup: Third Round
- Anglo-Scottish Cup: Preliminary Round

The 1979–80 season was Mansfield Town's 43rd season in the Football League and 15th in the Third Division they finished in 23rd position with 36 points suffering relegation to the Fourth Division.

== Final league table ==
Pos	Team	Pld	W	D	L	GF	GA	GD	Pts	Promotion or relegation
20	Hull City	46	12	16	18	51	69	−18	40	
21	Bury (R)	46	16	7	23	45	59	−14	39	Relegation to the Fourth Division
22	Southend United (R)	46	14	10	22	47	58	−11	38	Relegation to the Fourth Division
23	Mansfield Town (R)	46	10	16	20	47	58	−11	36	Relegation to the Fourth Division
24	Wimbledon (R)	46	10	14	22	52	81	−29	34	Relegation to the Fourth Division

Source: rsssf.com
(R) Relegated

== Results ==
=== Football League Third Division ===
Match	Date	Opponent	Venue	Result	Attendance	Scorers
1	18 August 1979	Chesterfield	H	3–2	5,662	Allen, Bird, Curtis
2	21 August 1979	Rotherham United	A	1–2	4,492	Austin
3	25 August 1979	Exeter City	A	1–2	3,475	Austin
4	1 September 1979	Hull City	H	1–1	4,320	Austin
5	8 September 1979	Barnsley	A	0–1	10,588	
6	15 September 1979	Oxford United	H	1–0	4,217	Austin
7	18 September 1979	Colchester United	A	1–2	2,346	Bird
8	22 September 1979	Sheffield United	H	3–4	11,272	Austin, Allen, Taylor
9	29 September 1979	Reading	A	0–1	6,123	
10	1 October 1979	Colchester United	H	0–1	3,754	
11	6 October 1979	Sheffield Wednesday	A	0–0	13,263	
12	8 October 1979	Rotherham United	H	5–1	6,308	Austin (3), Taylor (2)
13	13 October 1979	Bury	H	1–0	4,486	Hamilton
14	20 October 1979	Millwall	A	2–2	6,039	Austin, Lathan
15	23 October 1979	Carlisle United	A	1–1	4,898	Austin
16	27 October 1979	Gillingham	H	2–0	4,598	Taylor, Bird
17	3 November 1979	Chesterfield	A	0–2	7,601	
18	6 November 1979	Carlisle United	H	2–1	4,195	Taylor, Bird
19	10 November 1979	Swindon Town	H	1–1	4,425	Taylor
20	17 November 1979	Chester	A	0–1	3,118	
21	1 December 1979	Blackpool	H	1–1	4,324	Austin
22	8 December 1979	Grimsby Town	A	1–2	7,910	Austin
23	21 December 1979	Plymouth Argyle	H	0–0	2,973	
24	26 December 1979	Blackburn Rovers	A	0–0	8,491	
25	29 December 1979	Exeter City	H	0–1	3,711	
26	12 January 1980	Hull City	A	1–3	4,243	Allen
27	26 January 1980	Wimbledon	H	1–1	3,897	Bird
28	2 February 1980	Oxford United	A	1–3	3,060	Pollard
29	9 February 1980	Sheffield United	A	0–1	14,921	
30	16 February 1980	Reading	H	2–2	3,114	Pollard, Austin
31	23 February 1980	Bury	A	2–0	3,606	Pollard, Austin
32	1 March 1980	Millwall	H	1–0	4,162	Austin
33	8 March 1980	Gillingham	A	0–2	4,572	
34	10 March 1980	Brentford	H	0–0	3,461	
35	15 March 1980	Sheffield Wednesday	H	1–1	16,019	Mellor (o.g.)
36	17 March 1980	Southend United	A	1–1	2,983	Allen
37	22 March 1980	Swindon Town	A	1–2	8,195	Stroud (o.g.)
38	29 March 1980	Chester	H	2–1	3,097	Austin (2)
39	1 April 1980	Plymouth Argyle	A	0–0	4,669	
40	5 April 1980	Blackburn Rovers	H	0–1	7,385	
41	7 April 1980	Brentford	A	0–2	6,057	
42	12 April 1980	Southend United	H	3–1	3,514	Austin (2), McClelland
43	14 April 1980	Barnsley	H	1–4	6,789	Bird
44	19 April 1980	Blackpool	A	1–1	5,677	Bird
45	26 April 1980	Grimsby Town	H	0–0	10,095	
46	3 May 1980	Wimbledon	A	2–3	1,759	Taylor, Pollard

=== FA Cup ===
Round	Date	Opponent	Venue	Result	Attendance	Scorers
R1	24 November 1979	Blyth Spartans	A	2–0	4,443	McClelland, Allen
R2	15 December 1979	Doncaster Rovers	A	2–1	7,952	Austin, Curtis
R3	5 January 1980	Brighton & Hove Albion	H	0–2	8,204	

=== League Cup ===
Round	Date	Opponent	Venue	Result	Attendance	Scorers
R1 1st leg	11 August 1979	York City	H	1–0	3,117	Taylor
R1 2nd leg	14 August 1979	York City	A	2–3	2,590	Wood, Hamilton
R2 1st leg	29 August 1979	Reading	A	3–4	5,779	Taylor, Bird, Austin
R2 2nd leg	4 September 1979	Reading	H	4–2	4,326	Taylor, Austin (2), McClelland
R3	25 September 1979	Queens Park Rangers	H	0–3	9,485	

=== Anglo-Scottish Cup ===
Round	Date	Opponent	Venue	Result	Attendance	Scorers
PR	31 July 1979	Sheffield United	A	0–1	4,875	
PR	4 August 1979	Notts County	H	0–1	3,527	
PR	8 August 1979	Cambridge United	A	1–1	4,620	Curtis

== Squad statistics ==
- Squad list sourced from 1979–80 Mansfield Town F.C. season at the English National Football Archive (subscription required)

Pos.	Name	League		FA Cup		League Cup		Anglo-Scottish Cup		Total	
Pos.	Name	Apps	Goals	Apps	Goals	Apps	Goals	Apps	Goals	Apps	Goals
GK	(England) Rod Arnold	43	0	3	0	5	0	3	0	54	0
GK	(England) Martin New	3	0	0	0	0	0	0	0	3	0
DF	(England) Kevin Bird	38	7	3	0	5	0	3	0	49	7
DF	(England) Adrian Burrows	17	0	0(1)	0	0	0	0	0	17(1)	0
DF	(England) Bob Curtis	31(3)	1	2(1)	1	5	0	3	1	41(5)	3
DF	(England) Derek Dawkins	35	0	3	0	5	0	3	0	46	0
DF	(England) Barry Foster	15	0	1	0	4	0	3	0	23	0
DF	(Northern Ireland) John McClelland	43	1	3	1	2(1)	1	0	0	48(1)	3
DF	(Scotland) Les McJannet	2	0	0	0	0	0	0	0	2	0
DF	(England) Ian Wood	21	0	2	0	4	1	3	0	30	1
DF	(England) Brian Thompson	9	0	0	0	0	0	0(1)	0	9(1)	0
MF	(England) Neville Hamilton	32(1)	1	1	0	5	1	3	0	41(1)	2
MF	(England) John Lathan	29	1	2	0	3	0	0	0	34	1
MF	(Scotland) Arthur Mann	35	0	3	0	0	0	0	0	38	0
MF	(England) Gary Saxby	0	0	0	0	2	0	3	0	5	0
FW	(England) Russell Allen	38(6)	4	2	1	5	1	3	0	48(6)	6
FW	(England) Terry Austin	46	19	3	1	5	2	3	0	57	22
FW	(Scotland) David Caldwell	1(2)	0	0	0	0	0	0	0	1(2)	0
FW	(England) Dave Goodwin	4	0	0	0	0(2)	0	0(2)	0	4(4)	0
FW	(England) Johnny Miller	9(1)	0	0	0	0	0	0	0	9(1)	0
FW	(England) Brian Pollard	20	4	0	0	0	0	0	0	20	4
FW	(England) Steve Taylor	30(7)	7	3	0	5	3	3	0	41(7)	10
FW	(Scotland) Brian Thomson	5(3)	0	2	0	0	0	0	0	7(3)	0
–	Own goals	–	2	–	0	–	0	–	0	–	2
