= 1976–77 Mansfield Town F.C. season =

Mansfield Town
1976–77 season
- Manager: Peter Morris
- Stadium: Field Mill
- Third Division: 1st
- FA Cup: Second Round
- League Cup: Fifth Round

The 1976–77 season was Mansfield Town's 40th season in the Football League and 13th in the Third Division, they finished in 1st position with 64 points gaining their first promotion to the second tier.

== Final league table ==
Pos	Team	Pld	W	D	L	GF	GA	GD	Pts	Promotion or relegation
1	Mansfield Town (C, P)	46	28	8	10	78	42	+36	64	Promotion to the Second Division
2	Brighton & Hove Albion (P)	46	25	11	10	83	40	+43	61	Promotion to the Second Division
3	Crystal Palace (P)	46	23	13	10	68	40	+28	59	Promotion to the Second Division
4	Rotherham United	46	22	15	9	69	44	+25	59	
5	Wrexham	46	24	10	12	80	54	+26	58	

Source: rsssf.com
(C) Champions; (P) Promoted

== Results ==
=== Football League Third Division ===
Match	Date	Opponent	Venue	Result	Attendance	Scorers
1	21 August 1976	Preston North End	H	3–1	5,688	McCaffrey, Eccles (2)
2	28 August 1976	Rotherham United	A	0–3	5,358	
3	4 September 1976	Grimsby Town	H	3–0	5,221	Eccles (3)
4	7 September 1976	Oxford United	A	3–0	4,017	Eccles, Foster, Randall
5	11 September 1976	York City	A	1–0	2,716	Eccles
6	18 September 1976	Tranmere Rovers	H	1–1	6,859	Randall
7	25 September 1976	Crystal Palace	A	0–2	14,760	
8	2 October 1976	Bury	H	5–0	6,519	Matthews, Miller (2), Randall (2)
9	9 October 1976	Peterborough United	A	1–2	7,031	McCaffrey
10	16 October 1976	Chester	A	0–1	4,252	
11	23 October 1976	Brighton & Hove Albion	H	1–1	7,231	Foster
12	30 October 1976	Sheffield Wednesday	A	2–0	15,982	Miller, Matthews
13	2 November 1976	Shrewsbury Town	A	0–0	6,161	
14	6 November 1976	Lincoln City	H	3–1	8,232	Jim McCaffrey, Hodgson, Hubbard (o.g.)
15	8 November 1976	Reading	H	4–0	7,636	Randall (4)
16	13 November 1976	Gillingham	A	1–3	5,457	Hodgson
17	27 November 1976	Swindon Town	H	1–1	6,683	Hodgson
18	18 December 1976	Wrexham	H	2–0	5,399	Hodgson, Miller
19	27 December 1976	Chesterfield	A	1–0	11,826	Randall
20	28 December 1976	Port Vale	H	2–1	7,977	Randall, Moss
21	11 January 1977	Sheffield Wednesday	H	1–0	13,761	Moss
22	18 January 1977	Portsmouth	A	2–2	10,720	Moss, Miller
23	22 January 1977	Preston North End	A	2–1	11,110	Moss, Foster
24	5 February 1977	Rotherham United	H	3–1	11,527	Moss, Randall, Morris
25	7 February 1977	Oxford United	H	3–0	8,207	Moss (2), Bird
26	12 February 1977	Grimsby Town	A	1–0	5,536	Foster
27	15 February 1977	Lincoln City	A	2–3	9,588	Bird, McEwan
28	19 February 1977	York City	H	4–1	7,576	Randall (2), Bird, Morris
29	28 February 1977	Walsall	H	3–0	8,026	Bird, Morris, Robinson (o.g.)
30	5 March 1977	Crystal Palace	H	1–0	10,944	Foster
31	8 March 1977	Northampton Town	H	1–0	7,238	Randall
32	12 March 1977	Bury	A	0–2	5,321	
33	19 March 1977	Peterborough United	H	1–1	7,692	Cooke
34	21 March 1977	Tranmere Rovers	A	0–4	2,121	
35	26 March 1977	Chester	H	1–1	6,976	Moss
36	2 April 1977	Brighton & Hove Albion	A	1–3	23,034	Moss
37	9 April 1977	Port Vale	H	4–1	4,389	Bird (2), Foster, Randall
38	11 April 1977	Chesterfield	H	2–1	11,905	Bird, Moss
39	12 April 1977	Shrewsbury Town	H	1–0	9,840	Bird, McEwan
40	16 April 1977	Reading	A	0–1	5,121	
41	19 April 1977	Walsall	A	2–1	7,001	Moss, Hynd (o.g.)
42	23 April 1977	Gillingham	H	2–2	8,191	Randall, Foster
43	30 April 1977	Swindon Town	A	1–0	6,015	Foster
44	2 May 1977	Portsmouth	H	2–0	10,744	Foster, Randall
45	7 May 1977	Northampton Town	H	3–0	11,314	McEwan, Bird, Moss
46	14 May 1977	Wrexham	A	1–0	20,754	Moss

=== FA Cup ===
Round	Date	Opponent	Venue	Result	Attendance	Scorers
R1	20 November 1976	Huddersfield Town	A	0–0	9,025	
R1 Replay	22 November 1976	Huddersfield Town	H	2–1	9,036	Randall, Eccles
R2	15 December 1976	Matlock Town	A	2–5	8,181	Foster, Matthews

=== League Cup ===
Round	Date	Opponent	Venue	Result	Attendance	Scorers
R1 1st leg	14 August 1976	Scunthorpe United	H	2–0	5,224	McCaffrey, Eccles
R1 2nd leg	17 August 1976	Scunthorpe United	A	0–2	3,164	
R1 Replay	24 August 1976	Scunthorpe United	A	1–2	4,319	McCaffrey

== Squad statistics ==
- Squad list sourced from 1976–77 Mansfield Town F.C. season at the English National Football Archive (subscription required)

Pos.	Name	League		FA Cup		League Cup		Total	
Pos.	Name	Apps	Goals	Apps	Goals	Apps	Goals	Apps	Goals
GK	(England) Rod Arnold	46	0	3	0	3	0	52	0
DF	(England) Kevin Bird	37(1)	8	0	0	3	0	40(1)	8
DF	(England) Barry Foster	39	0	1	0	3	0	43	0
DF	(England) Colin Foster	44	9	3	1	0	0	47	10
DF	(England) Ian MacKenzie	28	0	3	0	3	0	34	0
DF	(Scotland) Sandy Pate	14	0	0	0	3	0	17	0
DF	(England) Mick Saxby	10	0	0	0	0	0	10	0
DF	(England) Ian Wood	13(1)	0	2	0	0	0	15(2)	0
MF	(England) Gordon Hodgson	46	4	3	0	3	0	52	4
MF	(England) Micky Laverick	0	0	0	0	2	0	2	0
MF	(England) Paul Matthews	17(1)	2	1	1	0	0	18(1)	3
MF	(England) Jim McCaffrey	16(2)	3	3	0	3	2	22(2)	5
MF	(England) Ian McDonald	15(7)	0	2	0	0	0	17(7)	0
MF	(Scotland) Billy McEwan	23	3	0	0	0	0	23	3
MF	(England) Peter Morris	32	3	3	0	3	0	38	3
FW	(England) Robbie Cooke	3(6)	1	1	0	0	0	4(6)	1
FW	(England) Terry Eccles	10	7	2	1	3	1	15	9
FW	(England) Johnny Miller	40	5	3	0	3	0	46	5
FW	(England) Ernie Moss	29	13	0	0	0	0	29	13
FW	(England) Kevin Randall	44	17	3	1	1	0	48	18
–	Own goals	–	3	–	0	–	0	–	3
