= History of Mansfield Town F.C. =

History of an English football club

Mansfield Town Football Club is a professional football club based in the town of Mansfield, Nottinghamshire, England. The team competes in EFL League One, the third tier of the English football league system. Nicknamed 'The Stags', they play in a blue and yellow kit. Since 1919, Mansfield have played at Field Mill.

The club was formed in 1897 as Mansfield Wesleyans and entered the Mansfield & District Amateur League in 1902, before changing its name to Mansfield Wesley and joining the Notts & District League in 1906. They then finally became Mansfield Town in 1910, and moved from the Notts & Derbyshire League to the Central Alliance the following year. Crowned Alliance champions in 1919–20, they joined the Midland League in 1921 and won this league on three occasions – 1923–24, 1924–25 and 1928–29 – before they were admitted into the Football League in 1931. They were relegated out of the Third Division in 1960, but won promotion out of the Fourth Division in 1962–63, remaining in the third tier for nine seasons until their relegation in 1972. They reached the Second Division for the first time after winning the Fourth Division title in 1974–75 and the Third Division title in 1976–77, only to suffer two relegations in three seasons.

Promoted out of the Fourth Division under the stewardship of Ian Greaves in 1985–86, they went on to win the Associate Members' Cup in 1986–87. Mansfield were however relegated in 1991 and promoted again in 1991–92, only to suffer an immediate relegation the following season. They won promotion once again in 2001–02, but were relegated to League Two in 2003 and lost their Football League status with a further relegation in 2008. They spent five seasons in the Conference until they were promoted back into the Football League after winning the Conference in 2012–13 following investment from new club owner John Radford.

== Club history ==
=== Before the Stags ===
The Stags were by no means the first Football Club in Mansfield. In fact, a team named Mansfield Town played in the Midland Counties League as early as the 1892–93 season. Mansfield Greenhalgh, a team for employees of the Greenhalgh & Sons Works, also competed in this league at the end of the 19th century, playing their home games at Field Mill. These two clubs merged in 1894 to form Mansfield FC, although after 6 seasons of mediocre performance, the club disbanded around the turn of the century.

=== Early years ===
1897-1902

Mansfield Town was founded in 1897 under the name of Mansfield Wesleyans. Like many football clubs, their name derives from a local church, in this case the Wesleyan church on Bridge Street. Playing in Chocolate and Sky Blue shirts, with Royal Blue shorts and socks, the club played in friendly matches and local cup ties. Its first game was on 4 September 1897, drawing 2–2 against Sherwood Foresters. Mansfield first joined a league in the 1902–03 season, competing in the Mansfield and District Amateur League. 6 September 1902 saw the Wesleyans lose their first league fixture 1–0 away at Mansfield Corinthians. A week later, Shirebrook Swifts put 13 past the Mansfield goalkeeper without reply, the worst defeat ever suffered by the club in a competitive match. The team ended its first season in 7th place (of 12).

Mansfield's performances picked up, with finishes of 3rd, 5th and 3rd again in the following seasons. In preparation for the 1906–07 season, the league dropped the 'Amateur' tag from its name. The Church refused to have anything to do with this new-found professionalism, abandoning the club. The club replied by changing its name to Mansfield Wesley, and operated from then on as a professional club. Mansfield took advantage of this new-found freedom from the church by moving up into the Notts and District League, where they finished in a respectable 6th position in their first season. The final of the Mansfield Hospitals Charity Cup was also reached, however local rivals Mansfield Mechanics won 4–1. After a similar season the following year, the club showed signs of progression in 1908–09. Local lad Jack Needham was the star, picking up 46 goals in 35 games - earning himself a move to Birmingham FC - as Wesley finished 4th in the table.

1909–10 was an eventful season. Both the chairman, Fred Abraham, and the club secretary, James Marples, resigned after committing the heinous offence of signing a player on the Sabbath. The pair were later banned for life by the FA, although the club escaped with a two-point deduction. Missing Needham, Mansfield dropped to 17th in the league. Wesley entered the FA Cup for the first time in their history, participating in six matches before losing to the Mechanics (again) in a Second Qualifying Round Replay.

1906-1910

At the Summer 1910 AGM, it was proposed that the club change its name to either Mansfield Town or Mansfield United, to help project the image of being the major club in the town. A vote saw "Mansfield Town" become the preferred option. The Mechanics protested this, seeing themselves as the major club in the town, however the FA approved the change.

It is easy to see why the Mechanics were unhappy, from the 1909–10 Nottinghamshire and Derbyshire League table.

Pos	Team	W	D	L	Pts	Notes
1	Mansfield Mechanics	21	8	5	48	Two points deducted
17	Mansfield Wesley	6	7	21	17	Two points deducted

=== Mansfield Town ===
The first
"Mansfield Town"
kit, 1910-1911

To further enhance the image, Town changed to a red-and-white strip. The first season under the new name saw an improvement in League performance, with Mansfield Town finishing 9th of 18 teams. They also reached the fourth qualifying round of the FA Cup and the semi-final of the Notts Senior Cup (losing to Notts County Reserves). The summer of 1911 saw a new league formed - the Central Alliance. 12 teams were accepted into this new league - one of them being Mansfield Town. Another change of kit came about this season, with the team adopting black-and-white quartered shirts, with black shorts and socks. The first season at the new level was a disaster for Town, finishing in next-to-last position with just 12 points. Mansfield also lost in the first qualifying round of the FA Cup, as well as losing to Notts County Reserves again in the County Cup.

Mansfield had to apply for re-election, although the league expanded to 18 teams and so the bottom two clubs were re-elected unopposed. Mansfield had to move ground in the summer of 1912, as the Great Central Railway extended their lines through the middle of the club's Newgate Lane ground. A move back to the pre-1902 ground on Radcliffe Gate was the only option. Facilities at this ground were so bad that players had to change in the local pub. At the same time, Mansfield Mechanics moved into their new ground, Field Mill. After two mediocre seasons in the league (10th and 15th), Mansfield were not re-elected in the summer of 1914, due to the state of the ground.

1911-1916

For the 1914–15 season, the club joined the Notts, Derby and District League. After a poor start to the season, Mansfield finished in 4th position, with 28 points from 26 matches. It was not a good season for cup competitions, with Mansfield losing 5–0 to Sutton Town in the Preliminary Qualifying Round of the FA Cup, and 11–0 to Newhall Swifts in the local Byron Cup.

The Great War had taken its toll on the Central Alliance. In the summer of 1915 nine teams left the competition, so when Mansfield applied to re-join they were immediately accepted. The league was split into two stages for the 1915–16 season. Town completed their first league double over the Mechanics during the first stage, and finished ahead of them for the first time as well, taking 6th place of 9 teams. In the second competition, Mansfield strolled to the title, winning all 10 games (another three teams had dropped out of the league). This included 6-0 wins home and away against the Mechanics. At the end of the season the Central Alliance decided to shut down until the conclusion to the war, and Mansfield Town soon followed suit.

=== A New Home ===
During the War, Mansfield Mechanics had not paid the rent on Field Mill. The owner of the ground, the Duke of Portland, agreed to rent the ground to the Mansfield branch of the Discharged and Disabled Soldiers and Sailors Federation (DDSSF) - provided that it also be made available to Old Comrades of the Great War. Instead of informing the Old Comrades of their rights, the DDSSF instead sought out Mansfield Town to become sub-tenants of the ground. Town agreed to make the ground fit for use in time for the 1919–20 season, bearing the cost of enclosing the ground and building new dressing rooms. This was the start of the end for the Mechanics, who eventually folded during the summer of 1919.

Mansfield marked the new era with another change of kit - this time to amber and royal blue halves. This saw the team pick up the nickname 'The Ambers'. The first league season back after the War saw Mansfield win the Central Alliance title, beating Ilkeston United to the title by one point. This was despite losing the last three games of the season. The 1920–21 season looked like it would go the same way, with Mansfield winning 10 out of the first 12 games of the season. Mansfield eventually slumped to 5th in the table, 15 points behind champions Leicester City Reserves. The Ambers also reached the fifth qualifying round of the FA Cup and the Final of the Notts Senior Cup, losing both (to Worksop Town and Nottingham Forest respectively) after a replay.

In the summer of 1921, Mansfield were admitted into the Midland Counties League (at the time one of the best divisions outside of the Football League), helped by an appearance in the Notts Senior Cup final and the fifth qualifying round of the FA Cup. A creditable first season in the Midland League was capped by a run in the FA Cup, reaching the 6th Qualifying round and taking League club Walsall to a replay. In 1922–23, the club again finished mid-table and again reached the 6th Qualifying Round of the FA Cup, losing to Halifax.

In the 1923–24 season, Mansfield appointed Jack Baynes as their first manager and raced to their first Midland League title, leading the club to apply for Football League status. Barrow and Hartlepool were re-elected, with Town not receiving a single vote. The following season, with fewer clubs, Mansfield won the competition and finished runners-up in the secondary competition, although again failed to get elected to the League. In 1925–26, the club finished second in the Midland League, despite scoring 120 goals. Mansfield again applied to join the Football League, but were instead only admitted to the Midland Combination. In the summer of 1926, Baynes contract as manager expired, and he was replaced by international footballer Teddy Davidson, as player-manager.

In the 1926–27 season, the club managed a respectable second place in a division made up of Football League reserve sides (apart from Mansfield), although another application to the Football League failed. Another FA Cup run led to another defeat by a League side (Walsall again). 1927–28 was a poor season, as Davidson resigned halfway through and the club could only manage 10th position back in the Midland League.

Jack Hickling was manager/secretary, and he made changes as only five players were kept in a team being re-built for glory. It worked, as Mansfield romped to the Midland League title by nine points. Arguably their most famous exploit was another FA Cup run. The club beat Ardsley Athletic to make the first round proper, where the beat Shirebrook to again face a League opponent in Barrow. Mansfield came from a goal down to win 2–1. Second Division Wolverhampton Wanderers were beaten 1–0 in the third round, leading to a Fourth round tie against Arsenal. Stags' captain Staniforth missed a crucial penalty which would have given Town the lead in the first half, although Arsenal later scored two goals to win. Mansfield gained notoriety in the press during their Cup run as "The egg and milk team", due to a fabricated story by the manager on the diet of the players which helped them in their Cup games. Incredibly, Mansfield were again refused election to the Football League as York City gained more votes than them.

=== The Football League ===
For the next two seasons, Mansfield finished in mid-table positions, and could not repeat their FA Cup exploits. Despite this, they applied for Football League status again in the summer of 1931. In a change of tactics, they applied to join the Southern section of Division Three to gain support from the northern clubs. With six votes more than Newport County, the Stags were finally elected to the Football League (at the sixth attempt).

In the following 6 years, the club had mainly mediocre seasons in the League, finishing in the top half only once, and nearly having to apply for re-election in their first season. A merry-go-round of managers occurred as Mansfield struggled, although two players stood out above the rest. Harry Johnson was signed for the Stags' first season and managed 104 goals in three years. When he retired he was replaced by Ted Harston, who managed 81 in two seasons, including 55 goals in the 1936–37 season before being transferred to Liverpool. Harry Crawshaw, Harston's replacement, managed 25 goals in his one season for Mansfield before leaving for Nottingham Forest. Short up front in 1938–39, Mansfield managed only 44 goals, finishing 16th in the last season before football was abandoned for World War Two.

=== Post War ===
Although faring poorly in wartime competition, Mansfield won the first two games of the 1946–47 season, drawing the third. From the on it was downhill as the club finished bottom, although due to the complications to all teams after the war, none of the bottom two from either division was relegated. For the next three years, Mansfield finished in comfortable mid-table positions.

In 1950–51, Mansfield became the first British team to remain unbeaten in a 23-game schedule, although could only finish second to Rotherham (only one team was promoted to the Second Division). The club made another brilliant run in the FA Cup, beating non-league Walthamstowe Avenue and Chelmsford City, Second Division Swansea and Sheffield United to make the fifth round. Stanley Matthews' Blackpool won 2–0 on their way to Wembley.

Mansfield could only finish 6th the following season and managed the first round of the FA Cup. In 1952–53, they finished 18th, although had an all-time record home crowd of 24,467 in the third round of the FA Cup against local rivals Nottingham Forest.

At the end of the season, it was announced that the Stags were £14,000 in debt, and close to liquidation. A series of friendlies, including a full-strength Nottingham Forest helped to raise money.

On the pitch, Mansfield were still very inconsistent. Positions of 7th, 18th, 16th, 6th, and 20th (in the new national Third Division) were recorded at the end of the 1950s. In 1959–60 the club was relegated to the Fourth Division, despite the appointment of Raich Carter as manager and another Third Round Cup run, losing to First Division Blackpool again.

The club finished fifth from bottom in their first Division Four season on goal average, before improving to finish mid-table in the next. In 1962–63, Mansfield were promoted on the last day of the season, drawing with Stockport in a game which kicked off an hour after that of fellow promotion chasers Gillingham. There was scandal during the season though, as captain Brian Phillips was implicated by The People newspaper in a match-fixing scandal.

After finishing 7th in the 1963–64 season, Mansfield narrowly missed promotion to the Second Division in 1964–65. In second place, and two points clear of Bristol City with two games left, the Stags eventually missed out on goal average.

In January 1965, Brian Phillips was imprisoned for 15 months, alongside fellow Stag Sammy Chapman (6 months) and several players from other clubs for their part in the match-fixing scandal.

=== Giant killers ===
More inconsistencies followed in the League as Mansfield finished 18th and 9th before actually finishing in the bottom four. Mansfield were however reprieved when Peterborough were deducted points for illegal payments to players. Another mid-table season followed in 1968–69, but it was another cup run that made headlines for the Stags.

Tow Law Town, who had surprised Mansfield 5–1 the previous year, were dispatched in Round 1. Rotherham were beaten after a replay, and Sheffield United were defeated 2–1. Mansfield came from behind to beat Southend in the fourth round, leading to a match with West Ham United. Incredibly, Mansfield won 3–0. West Ham were standing sixth in the First Division and their side featured England's World Cup winners Bobby Moore, Martin Peters and Geoff Hurst along with youngsters Billy Bonds and Trevor Brooking. The game was postponed five times before it finally went ahead on Wednesday 26 February 1969 in front of 21,117 at Field Mill. Mansfield became only the fourth team in club history to knock out clubs from five different leagues in the same competition. They progressed to the quarter-final stage where they were unlucky to lose to Leicester City, being stopped from scoring by young keeper Peter Shilton.

In 1970–71, the Stags finished sixth in Division Three, and went on another FA Cup run, eventually losing in the fifth round to First Division champions Leeds United. Another good league season followed when the club finished 7th. Another upset nearly occurred in the League Cup, when Mansfield drew 0–0 with Liverpool, having a goal harshly disallowed late on.

In the 1971–72 season, Mansfield needed a victory to guarantee safety in their last game against Wrexham. A 1–1 draw was not enough, and the Stags were relegated on goal difference. Mansfield threw away promotion on the last day of the following season, leading Cambridge twice but losing 3–2. (Cambridge were promoted in Mansfield's place) 1973–74 was a massive disappointment, as Mansfield finished in 17th place.

=== Two promotions ===
Under manager Dave Smith, they claimed the Division Four title in 1974–75, with new signing Ray Clarke scoring 30 goals out of a team total of 100. Mansfield also made a TV appearance, when First Division Carlisle visited in the fifth round of the FA Cup.

In 1975–76, Mansfield were bottom by five points, but a run of form led them to finish only 9 points off promotion. However, it was announced at the end of the season that Smith would be relieved of his duties, with no reason given by the chairman. Mansfield were then promoted to the second tier for the only time in their history in 1976–77, winning the championship ahead of Wrexham. This was despite a shock 5–2 defeat to Matlock Town in the FA Cup.

However, they were relegated at the end of the 1977–78 season. This was after a season of some extraordinary games, including a 3–3 draw with Tottenham Hotspur which featured two hat-tricks – Glenn Hoddle and Dave Syrett. By April of the following year, Mansfield were in the Division Three relegation zone, however a good run of form at the end of the season helped them to finish 18th.

=== The club's only Cup win ===
Mansfield won the Freight Rover Trophy in 1987, in their first game at Wembley Stadium, played in front of 58,000 fans. After a 1–1 draw with Bristol City, they won the cup 5–4 in the deciding penalty shootout, thanks to Kevin Hitchcock saving two penalties. Keith Cassells was Man of the Match. In the 1987–88 season Mansfield were narrowly defeated 2–1 at home in the FA Cup to eventual winners Wimbledon.

=== "Yo-yo" years ===
In the 1990–91 season, Mansfield finished bottom of the Third Division with just 8 League wins. However, they reached the third round of the FA Cup before losing 2–0 to Sheffield Wednesday. However, they went straight back up the following year, beating Rochdale F.C. 2–1 on the final day of the season to finish third and get promoted to the new Division Two.

Once again though, the Stags were straight back down. Phil Stant, who had been one of the main reasons for Mansfield's promotion, was sold to Cardiff to help reduce the club's debts. The club won just eleven games all season and relegation was sealed with two games left.

During the off-season, the ownership of the club changed, as Sheffield-based "property developer" Keith Haslam took over at the age of 34. George Foster was sacked as manager, with assistant Billy Dearden appointed as caretaker manager. With the club in 11th place in November, former Everton striker Andy King was appointed as permanent manager. The club finished the season in 12th place.

1994–95 was much better for the Stags. Simon Ireland scored the only goal in the League Cup first leg at Elland Road as Leeds United were beaten 1–0. In the second leg, Mansfield held on at home to draw 0–0 and secure a memorable victory. In the league things were looking up as well. By the New Year, Mansfield were mid-table, however a spectacular run of form up to March (including an unlucky 3–2 3rd round FA Cup defeat to Wolverhampton Wanderers, which Mansfield led 2–0) gave Mansfield a play-off place.

A 1–1 draw with fierce rivals Chesterfield at Field Mill meant it was all to play for in the second leg. Mansfield led twice but had to settle for a 2–2 draw (3–3 on aggregate). Disaster struck as two Mansfield players were sent off and Chesterfield scored three times to win 6–3 and reach the final, where they beat Bury to get promoted.

The side lost many of its better players, with Paul Holland, Steve Wilkinson and Darren Ward, three of Mansfield's main players in the play-off season, all left in the summer. Mansfield, depleted with few signings, finished 19th. The following season, King was sacked after just three games. Captain Steve Parkin took over as manager, but his spell started just as badly, with Mansfield fifth from bottom at the New Year. Good results between New Year and Easter meant the Stags were two points off a play-off place with five games left, although they just missed out.

1997–98 and 1998–99 finished pretty much the same for Mansfield. In 1997–98, the club was again just above the relegation zone until a good run of form left them 12th, five points off the play-offs. 1998–99 was the opposite. 40 points were gained from the first half of the season, whereas only 27 points were gained from the second half, leaving Mansfield with a slightly disappointing finish of 8th. Mansfield were actually still in the play-offs with three games left, but lost the next two games, extinguishing all hopes of the play-offs for another season.

News came in June that Mansfield had been placed under a transfer embargo, after having to borrow money from the PFA to pay players' wages. Parkin resigned, and Billy Dearden took over in July with just 9 players at the club. A squad was hastily put together, which showed in the first game of the season, a 6–0 defeat to Brighton. A poor start was balanced out by a five-game unbeaten run, pushing Stags back up the table. Fans' favourite Lee Peacock was transferred to Manchester City in October, with Chris Greenacre going in the opposite direction. Patches of good and bad form carried on throughout the season, with Mansfield in 8th place at more than one point, including with 9 games left. However, another run of bad form came (including 8 games without a goal) and just 2 points from the last 9 games left the Stags 17th.

Mansfield's first game of the season had to be switched from home to away as redevelopments of Field Mill had not been completed. In the first game, away to Cheltenham, Chris Greenacre scored an incredible goal, in open play, from the edge of the centre circle, lobbing the 'keeper. In the next game, away at Barnet, midfielder Mark Blake did the same, albeit from 'only' 35 yards. On 28 August 2000, Mansfield drew 4–4 with Macclesfield in the first game at the newly redeveloped Field Mill. 2 February saw the newly developed West Stand opened with a 1–1 draw with Exeter. A poor run of form saw Mansfield drop from 9th place down the table.

On Easter Monday, in tragic circumstances, referee Mike North collapsed and died of a heart attack during the Stags' game with Southend United.

Eventually, a 2–0 victory over Leyton Orient started a run of 4 wins in the last 6 games saw Mansfield finish the season in 13th.

=== Long awaited promotion ===
Mansfield were at the top end of the table for the 2001–02 season. They looked resigned to a play-off place until they beat promotion rivals Cheltenham 2–1 in April. A poor 3–1 defeat away at York City followed, meaning Mansfield had to win and hope Cheltenham dropped points at champions Plymouth for the Stags to get promoted. 2–0 victories for Mansfield and Plymouth were enough to give Mansfield a first promotion in 10 years.

However, they finished 23rd the following season, meaning they were straight back down in Division Three. In 2003–04, Mansfield reached the play-off final with a penalty shoot-out victory over Northampton (the team that finished 24th in Division Two the year before and were relegated with Mansfield), but lost on penalties to Huddersfield Town at the Millennium Stadium.

The result of this failure to get promoted again was that several key players, including leading scorer Liam Lawrence, left the club before the 2004–05 season. In November 2004, manager Keith Curle was suspended and later sacked over allegations of bullying a youth-team player. Carlton Palmer was appointed in his place, but many supporters were upset and angry at the appointment of a 'friend' of the chairman, and a person with no managerial experience. On a brighter note, striker Richard Barker signed for the club midway through the season, and quickly became a fan favourite with his gritty, determined, and never-say-die attitude. After a topsy-turvy season, the Stags finished in a low mid-table position.

After a poor start to the 2005–06 season, Carlton Palmer resigned in mid-September, giving in to intense pressure from the supporters. With the club propping up the whole of the football league, Palmer's assistant Peter Shirtliff was appointed manager, after impressing during his spell as caretaker manager. Shirtliff managed to guide the club to a mid-table finish after an eight-match unbeaten spell in February and March 2006. The highlight of the club's season was an FA Cup third round tie against Newcastle United at St. James' Park, a game they eventually lost 1–0. Peter Shirtliff parted company with the club on 19 December 2006 after a poor run of form. Paul Holland briefly took over as caretaker manager, before former manager Bill Dearden was re-hired by the club nine days later.

=== 77 years in the Football League, over ===
Mansfield had a poor 2007–08 season, sitting second bottom and in the relegation zone midway through the season, five points adrift of safety. Despite this, they had a FA Cup run, beating League One side Brighton & Hove Albion with a 2–1 victory at the Withdean Stadium. This set up a home-tie against Premiership side Middlesbrough in the fourth round, which they lost 2–0, live on Match of the Day.

Mansfield's poor form in league continued, however. Manager Billy Dearden was sacked, and replaced by Paul Holland. A freak goal for Rotherham in Mansfield's last home game of the season left the club's fate in other teams' hands. Mansfield's 77-year stay in the Football League was ended on 29 April 2008 when Chester City drew with Stockport County. Paul Holland was sacked in the summer for failing to keep the club in the Football League.

After Holland was deposed, Billy McEwan took over, although his tenure only lasted five months and he was sacked in December 2008, with Mansfield hovering just above the relegation places in 20th position. On 29 December 2008 former-Sheffield United defender David Holdsworth was appointed as the club's new manager. Holdsworth had previously lead Northern Premier League Premier Division club Ilkeston Town to 6th in the league, ten points off first placed Hednesford Town with two games in hand.

David Holdsworth made a fantastic impact in his start at the Stags, winning the majority of his games, instantly guiding the club away from their relegation worries. He shored up the Mansfield defence and with the new signings of Alan Marriott, Scott Garner and Paul Mayo the team broke the club record of five consecutive home clean sheets with six, against Crawley Town, Rushden & Diamonds, York City, Kettering Town, Lewes, finally beating the record with a 1–0 victory over Forest Green Rovers. Despite this fantastic home form, Mansfield couldn't pick up enough points to muster enough of a challenge for the play-offs. Another poor, mid-table season followed and in November 2010, David Holdsworth was sacked as manager.

Following Holdsworth's departure, Duncan Russell, the assistant manager, was named as the club's full-time manager. Under Russell, the Stags made a memorable run in the FA Trophy and on Saturday 19 March 2011, reached the final by defeating Luton Town F.C. 2–1 on aggregate, with a 120th-minute goal to draw 1–1 at Kenilworth Road. However their second trip to Wembley Stadium was not as successful as the first, finishing in an extra-time defeat to Darlington.

Following a poor showing in the 2010–2011 league campaign, Russell was told his contract as manager would not be renewed, with Paul Cox later announced as his replacement. Cox led Mansfield to their highest Conference finish in his first season. A good run of form after Christmas saw the Stags finish in third in the league, although they lost 2–1 on aggregate to eventual play-off winners York City after extra time in the promotion play-off semi-final.

An indifferent start to the 2012–13 season left Mansfield lingering around mid-table, with some fans calling for the manager's head. One good point to the first half of the season was the club's FA Cup run. A 2–1 win over Lincoln City set up a third round tie with Premier League side Liverpool. A controversial Luis Suárez goal helped the Reds to a 2–1 victory, but a brave display from the Mansfield team gave the team momentum in the weeks to follow. Following the cup game the Stags won 20 of their last 24 games, including a club record run of 12 consecutive wins, to clinch the Blue Square Bet Premier title, and promotion back to the Football League. The title was sealed with a 1–0 victory over Wrexham on 20 April 2013.

=== 2013–present: Return to the Football League ===
Mansfield finished their first season back in the Football League in 11th place. In 2018–19, the Stags narrowly missed out on promotion on the final day of the season after a defeat to promotion rivals MK Dons. They then lost in the play-offs on penalties to Newport County in the semi-final. After a poor start to the 2020–21 season, Nigel Clough took over as manager in November and steered Mansfield to relative safety. 12 games without a win early in the 2021–22 season saw Mansfield second bottom of League Two in late October, but after a subsequent 14-match unbeaten streak from late November to early March, including a club-record 11 straight home wins, the Stags finished 7th in League Two, just 3 points shy of automatic promotion. They beat Northampton Town 3–1 on aggregate in the play-off semi-finals. However, in the final Port Vale secured an emphatic 3–0 win. In the 2023–24 season, Mansfield started their campaign with a 19 match unbeaten run and were later promoted to League One, finishing in 3rd position.

== Records ==
=== Team records ===
==== Match Records ====
Home League Matches

Record	Scoreline	Opponents	Date
Winning margin	9–2	Harrogate Town	13.02.2024
Winning margin	9–2	Rotherham United	27.12.1932
Winning margin	8–1	Queens Park Rangers	15.03.1965
Winning margin	7–0	Scunthorpe United	21.04.1975
Winning margin	7–0	Barrow	17.03.2012
Winning margin	8–1	Barrow	09.02.2013
Goals scored	9–2	Rotherham United	27.12.1932
Goals scored	9–2	Harrogate Town	13.02.2024
Losing margin	1–7	Reading	12.03.1932
Losing margin	1–7	Peterborough United	26.03.1966
Losing margin	1–7	Queens Park Rangers	24.09.1966
Goals conceded	1–7	Reading	12.03.1932
Goals conceded	1–7	Peterborough United	26.03.1966
Goals conceded	1–7	Queens Park Rangers	24.09.1966
Aggregate goals	9–2	Rotherham United	27.12.1932
High-scoring draw	4–4	Southend United	07.11.1931
High-scoring draw	4–4	Norwich City	22.03.1947
High-scoring draw	4–4	Oldham Athletic	02.11.1957
High-scoring draw	4–4	Reading	26.09.1959
High-scoring draw	4–4	Macclesfield Town	28.08.2000

Away League Matches

Record	Scoreline	Opponents	Date
Winning margin	5–0	Histon	27.12.1932
Goals scored	6–2	Lincoln City	27.03.1963
Goals scored	6–4	Doncaster Rovers	15.11.1966
Goals scored	6–2	Wigan Athletic	07.10.1995
Goals scored	6–3	Alfreton Town	20.03.2012
Losing margin	1–8	Walsall	19.01.1933
Losing margin	0–7	Crewe Alexandra	04.02.1933
Losing margin	0–7	Walsall	05.10.1935
Goals conceded	1–8	Walsall	19.01.1933
Goals conceded	3–8	Plymouth Argyle	07.03.1959
Aggregate goals	5–7	York City	16.11.1935
High-scoring draw	4–4	Chesterfield	17.09.1962
High-scoring draw	4–4	Bristol Rovers	15.10.1966
High-scoring draw	4–4	Bristol Rovers	19.03.2005

Best seasons

- Most wins

— 17 – 1950–51, 1951–2, 1964–65, 1974–75, 1976–77, 2001–02 (Home)
— 11 – 1974–75, 1976–77 (Away)
— 28 – 1974–75, 1976–77 (Overall)

- Fewest defeats

— 0 – 1950–51, 1963–64, 1974–75, 1976–77 (Home)
— 1950–51 – Mansfield became the first Football League club to complete a 23-game home schedule unbeaten.
— 6 – 1974–75 (Away)
— 6 – 1974–75 (Overall)

- Most goals for

— 108 – 1962–63

- Fewest goals against

— 38 – 1984–85

- Most points

— 68 – 1974–75 (2 points per win)
— 81 – 1985–86 (3 points per win)

=== Player records ===
Records for all recognized league and cup competitions

Most appearances	Rank	Most goals
Rod Arnold (1970–71, 1972–84); 522 games	1	Harry Johnson (1931–36); 114 goals
Sandy Pate (1967–78); 489	2	Ken Wagstaff (1960–65); 107
Kevin Bird (1972–83); 463	3	Steve Wilkinson (1989–95); 92
George Foster (1983–93); 459	4	Roy Chapman (1961–65); 82
Don Bradley (1949–62); 413	5	Ted Harston (1935–37); 85
