= Ernie Moss =

English footballer (1949–2021)

Personal information
- Full name: Ernest Moss
- Date of birth: 19 October 1949
- Place of birth: Hollingwood, England
- Date of death: 11 July 2021 (aged 71)
- Place of death: Chesterfield, England
- Height: 5 ft 11 in (1.80 m)
- Position: Forward

Youth career
- Chesterfield Tube

Senior career*
Years	Team	Apps	(Gls)
1968–1975	Chesterfield	271	(95)
1975–1976	Peterborough United	35	(9)
1976–1979	Mansfield Town	57	(21)
1979–1981	Chesterfield	107	(33)
1981–1983	Port Vale	74	(23)
1983	Lincoln City	11	(2)
1983–1984	Doncaster Rovers	44	(15)
1984–1986	Chesterfield	91	(34)
1986–1987	Stockport County	26	(7)
1987–1988	Scarborough	23	(4)
1987–1988	→ Rochdale (loan)	10	(2)
1988–1990	Kettering Town		
1990–1991	Matlock Town		
1991	Shepshed Charterhouse		
1991–1992	Kettering Town		
Total		749	(245)

Managerial career
- 1992–1994: Boston United (assistant)
- 1995–1998: Gainsborough Trinity
- 1998–1999: Leek Town
- 1999–2000: Gainsborough Trinity
- 2000–2001: Kettering Town (assistant)
- 2001–2004: Matlock Town
- 2004–2005: Hucknall Town
- 2005–2007: Belper Town
- * Club domestic league appearances and goals

Ernest Moss (19 October 1949 – 11 July 2021) was an English footballer, most associated with his home town club, Chesterfield, where in three separate spells he made 539 appearances, scoring a club record 192 goals. He was later voted PFA Fans' Favourites and cult hero number one by the club's supporters. His total of 749 league appearances puts him in the top 25 all-time list for Football League appearances.

With Chesterfield he won the Fourth Division title in 1969–70 and 1984–85. He was also promoted out of the fourth tier with Port Vale in 1982–83 and with Doncaster Rovers in 1983–84. He also won the Third Division title with Mansfield Town in 1976–77 and finished second in the Conference with Kettering Town in 1988–89. In addition to these achievements, he was also voted Port Vale F.C. Player of the Year in 1982. Other Football League clubs he played for include Peterborough United, Lincoln City, Stockport County, Scarborough, and Rochdale. He also turned out for non-League sides Matlock Town and Shepshed Charterhouse.

He later embarked on a 15-year career as a manager at the non-League level of the English football pyramid, taking charge at Gainsborough Trinity, Leek Town, Matlock Town, Hucknall Town, and Belper Town. He led Gainsborough to a Northern Premier League Challenge Cup and Peter Swales Shield double in 1997, as well as a further Challenge Cup final appearance in 1998. He also won promotion out of the Northern Premier League First Division with Matlock Town in 2003–04. He also worked as Peter Morris's assistant at Boston United and Kettering Town.

== Playing career ==
=== Chesterfield ===
Moss worked as a clerk in the Derbyshire County Council education offices in Matlock at the time of his joining his hometown club Chesterfield, in April 1967, from the local Tube Works side. He made his debut at Bradford Park Avenue on 26 October 1968, signing professional forms a few days later before going on to make 16 further appearances in the season. The club were at a low ebb, and finished 1968–69 just two points above the re-election zone in the Fourth Division.

The "Spireites" were promoted as champions in 1969–70, winning 19 of their 23 league games at Saltergate. Moss was a major factor in the upturn in form, scoring twenty goals in the campaign, including four past Newport County. In 1970–71 he hit double figures by October. He was then sidelined for months after rupturing his ligaments at Vetch Field. Chesterfield were on the up, though, and finished the season fifth in the Third Division, two points off fallen giants Aston Villa. Chesterfield dropped back down to 13th in 1971–72, and finished just two points above the relegation zone in 1972–73. They again finished fifth in 1973–74, ending up five points shy of promotion. The club dropped back into the lower half of the table in 1974–75. After 95 goals in 271 league games, he was sold to Peterborough United, manager Joe Shaw having found a replacement in Steve Cammack.

=== Peterborough United and Mansfield Town ===
Noel Cantwell's "Posh" finished tenth in the Third Division in 1975–76, and Moss then spent the latter half of the 1976–77 season with promotion winning Mansfield Town, who under Peter Morris's stewardship topped the Third Division table on 64 points. After playing for the "Stags" in their first ever season in the Second Division, he returned to the third tier with Chesterfield in January 1979, now managed by Arthur Cox.

=== Return to Chesterfield ===
He helped the club to avoid relegation by just four points in 1978–79. The 1979–80 and 1980–81 seasons saw Chesterfield come close to promotion, missing out by one point and three points respectively. He helped the club to win the 1981 Anglo-Scottish Cup. However, he fell out with the club over a £5 pay rise, and in June 1981, he chose to move on to Port Vale.

=== Port Vale ===
The Fourth Division club splashed out £12,000 for his services and were to find the sum a good investment. In his debut season he became the club's top scorer with 17 goals, and picked up the Player of the Year award at the end of the campaign. Vale won promotion from the fourth tier in 1982–83, though Moss had been sold to Colin Murphy's Lincoln City for £1,500 in March 1983, despite still being a regular in the first XI. Despite his tally of 11 goals in 33 games in 1982–83, manager John McGrath claimed that "age caught up with him". McGrath nicknamed Moss and strike partner Bob Newton as the "Kray twins" due to their dominance of opposition defenders. McGrath had already signed his replacement in Jim Steel and was keen to offload Moss.

=== Later career ===
His time at Sincil Bank was brief, and he finished the 1983–84 season with Doncaster Rovers, as Rovers were promoted from the Fourth Division as runners-up under the management of Billy Bremner. In 1984, Moss signed with Chesterfield for a third time, now under the leadership of John Duncan. He won promotion from the fourth tier for the fourth time, and Chesterfield came up as champions in his first season back at Saltergate. The 1985–86 season was one of consolidation for Chesterfield, and his goals helped greatly. The Saltergate faithful were therefore taken by surprise when he was sold to Fourth Division Stockport County in December 1986, along with Phil Brown, for a combined fee of £10,000. County finished in mid-table, and Moss left at the end of the 1986–87 campaign. He was with Conference champions Scarborough for their first season in the Football League under Neil Warnock. He also had a short spell with strugglers Rochdale, scoring twice in ten games for Eddie Gray's side, before his career in the Football League came to an end.

Refusing to hang up his boots, he went on to play for Kettering Town of the Conference. He hit 17 goals in 1988–89, making him the club's top-scorer at 40. His goals helped Kettering to finish the season as runners-up, eight points behind Maidstone United. He later played for Matlock Town and Shepshed Charterhouse before he retired in his second spell with Kettering in 1992. At the age of 42 and also working as an assistant manager, he became the club's oldest scorer in the Conference.

== Style of play ==
When Moss was starting his career, Chesterfield manager Jimmy McGuigan described him as:

"A big, willing bloke, a charming fellow who had raw potential. His balance was nil, therefore his ball control was nil. He knew where the goal lay but he couldn't often hit it."

McGuigan worked hard to rectify this aspect of Moss' game, and his hard work paid off; the youngster soon formed a deadly partnership with Kevin Randall. McGuigan's training improved his overall abilities, though his heading skills had always been present. Moss always posed an aerial threat and scored many of his goals by towering over defenders and directing the ball into the net. A big man, he was closer to a "gentle giant" than a dirty player. Football historian Jeff Kent described him as a "wholehearted striker".

Moss claimed that

"For me competing was all about the pride and dignity of honest endeavour, and winning wasn't all about riches and rewards, it was about preserving one's sporting integrity, it was about honour."

None of his goals came from penalty kicks. Moss missed the only penalty he ever took, in his 1986 testimonial match against Sheffield United.

== Management career ==
Also a well-travelled non-League manager, he spent 1992 to 1994 as assistant manager to Peter Morris at Boston United. The "Pilgrims" were relegated out of the Conference in 1992–93, and spent 1993–94 in the Northern Premier League. He was appointed manager of Gainsborough Trinity in 1995. He led Trinity to a fifth-place finish in the Northern Premier League in 1995–96, three points behind champions Bamber Bridge. His team finished tenth in 1996–97 but did a cup double, beating Boston United in the final of the Northern Premier League Challenge Cup, and lifting the Peter Swales Shield after victory over league champions Leek Town. Trinity finished fifth again in 1997–98 and lost out to Altrincham in the final of the Challenge Cup.

In June 1998, he took charge at Conference club Leek Town. However, he was dismissed the following year after Leek were relegated, finishing nine points below the safety of Welling United. He was back in charge at Gainsborough by November 1999, replacing Steve Richards. He led the club to another tenth-place finish in 1999–2000. In 2000, he was appointed assistant manager of Kettering Town under Peter Morris, though the pair were sacked in February 2001, with the club bottom of the Conference.

He took the reins at Northern Premier League First Division club Matlock Town in 2001 and took the club to a 14th-place finish in 2001–02. He took the "Gladiators" to eighth place in 2002–03, finishing three points off the play-offs. Promotion was achieved in 2003–04, as a second-place finish was enough to take the club in the Premier Division. He was appointed manager at Conference North club Hucknall Town in 2004 but lost his job after just three months. He returned to the Northern Premier League First Division in January 2005, when he was named manager of Belper Town. Belper finished 17th in 2004–05, but moved up to ninth in 2005–06, eight points off the play-offs. The "Nailers" dropped down to 19th in 2006–07, and Moss was sacked. Moss went on to coach youngsters at Chesterfield's community scheme and performed scouting missions.

== Personal life ==
He married his wife Jenny, a nurse, in 1971. They had two daughters; Nikki, born in December 1974, and Sarah, in May 1977. Moss established the Moss & Miller sports shop with former England cricketer Geoff Miller.

He was diagnosed with Pick's disease in October 2014. On 11 January 2015, Chesterfield declared their home match with Port Vale as "Ernie Moss Day", where money was raised for dementia charities. On 25 April 2017, a road adjacent to the Proact Stadium was named Ernie Moss Way in his honour. A second "Ernie Moss Day" was celebrated when Port Vale played at Chesterfield on 19 August 2017. At this match, a mosaic portrait of Moss by artist Rob Lally was unveiled in the Proact Stadium foyer. He contracted Coronavirus disease 2019 during the COVID-19 pandemic in the United Kingdom and had beaten the disease by the end of May 2020. Moss died on 11 July 2021, aged 71.

== Career statistics ==
Appearances and goals by club, season and competition
Club	Season	League			FA Cup		Other		Total	
Club	Season	Division	Apps	Goals	Apps	Goals	Apps	Goals	Apps	Goals
Chesterfield	1968–69	Fourth Division	17	1	3	3	0	0	20	4
Chesterfield	1969–70	Fourth Division	44	20	1	0	1	0	46	20
Chesterfield	1970–71	Third Division	44	16	3	3	1	1	48	20
Chesterfield	1971–72	Third Division	40	9	4	2	1	0	45	11
Chesterfield	1972–73	Third Division	16	7	0	0	4	3	20	10
Chesterfield	1973–74	Third Division	43	17	2	0	4	2	49	21
Chesterfield	1974–75	Third Division	46	20	3	3	2	0	51	23
Chesterfield	1975–76	Third Division	21	5	1	0	2	0	24	5
Chesterfield	Total		271	95	17	11	15	6	303	112
Peterborough United	1975–76	Third Division	21	6	0	0	0	0	21	6
Peterborough United	1976–77	Third Division	14	3	2	1	5	2	21	6
Peterborough United	Total		35	9	2	1	5	2	42	12
Mansfield Town	1976–77	Third Division	29	13	0	0	0	0	29	13
Mansfield Town	1977–78	Second Division	15	6	0	0	2	0	17	6
Mansfield Town	1978–79	Third Division	13	2	0	0	2	0	15	2
Mansfield Town	Total		57	21	0	0	4	0	61	21
Chesterfield	1978–79	Third Division	23	5	0	0	0	0	23	5
Chesterfield	1979–80	Third Division	45	14	2	0	5	4	52	18
Chesterfield	1980–81	Third Division	39	14	3	0	13	5	55	19
Chesterfield	Total		107	33	5	0	18	9	130	42
Port Vale	1981–82	Fourth Division	44	13	4	2	3	2	51	17
Port Vale	1982–83	Fourth Division	30	10	1	0	2	1	33	11
Port Vale	Total		74	23	5	2	5	3	84	28
Lincoln City	1982–83	Third Division	11	2	0	0	1	0	12	2
Doncaster Rovers	1983–84	Fourth Division	44	15	1	0	7	2	52	17
Chesterfield	1984–85	Fourth Division	33	12	1	0	3	0	37	12
Chesterfield	1985–86	Third Division	39	14	2	0	3	3	44	17
Chesterfield	1986–87	Third Division	19	8	1	0	3	0	23	8
Chesterfield	Total		91	34	4	0	9	0	104	34
Stockport County	1986–87	Fourth Division	26	7	0	0	0	0	26	7
Scarborough	1987–88	Fourth Division	23	4	0	0	3	0	26	4
Rochdale (loan)	1987–88	Fourth Division	10	2	0	0	0	0	10	2
Career total			749	245	34	14	67	22	850	281

== Honours ==
=== As a player ===
Chesterfield

- Football League Fourth Division: 1969–70, 1984–85
- Anglo-Scottish Cup: 1980–81

Mansfield Town

- Football League Third Division: 1976–77

Port Vale

- Football League Fourth Division third-place promotion: 1982–83

Lincoln City

- Football League Group Cup runner-up: 1982–83

Doncaster Rovers

- Football League Fourth Division second-place promotion: 1983–84

Individual

- Port Vale Player of the Year: 1982
- PFA Fans' Favourites player (Chesterfield): 2007

=== As a manager ===
Gainsborough Trinity

- Northern Premier League Challenge Cup: 1997
- Peter Swales Shield: 1997
- Northern Premier League Challenge Cup runner-up: 1998

Matlock Town

- Northern Premier League First Division second-place promotion: 2003–04
