= Barrie Vassallo =

Welsh footballer

Barrie Emmanuel Vassallo (born 1 March 1956) is a Welsh former professional football midfielder. He represented Wales at schools' level. He was most recently manager of Chepstow Town F.C.

== Playing career ==
Vassallo began his career as an apprentice at Arsenal, turning professional in May 1973. He failed to break into the first team at Highbury, moving to Plymouth Argyle in November 1974 for a fee of £10,000. His appearances at Argyle were limited by the presence of Paul Mariner in the Pilgrims' side, Vassallo only making 13 league appearances (7 of which were as substitute), scoring twice, before leaving for Aldershot. He left Aldershot without making the first team, joining non-league Barnstaple Town.

In March 1977 he returned to league football, joining Torquay United for a fee of £3,000. He quickly established himself in the first team, playing all of the last 15 games of the 1976–77 season. The following season started in a similar fashion, with a run of 26 games from the start of the season before losing his place to Kenny Raper. He made just three further appearances that season, in place of Willie Brown.

Although he played the first game of the 1978–79 season, he would make only one further appearance for Torquay, as a substitute for Lindsay Parsons in a 1–0 defeat away to AFC Bournemouth in November 1978 before returning to non-league football with Welsh side Bridgend Town. He went on to play for Kidderminster Harriers, Merthyr Tydfil, and Gloucester City, before retiring due to injury, on which he was given a testimonial by Gloucester City in the 1987–88 season, with Arsenal being the visitors. He later came out of retirement to play for Newport County and Cinderford Town.

== Management ==
In 1997, he became manager of Welsh League side Chepstow Town, guiding them from the Gwent County League to the Welsh League Division Two. He left Chepstow in the summer of 2001 when he was appointed manager of Caldicot Town (AFC), resigning in August 2002 just a week before the start of the season. He later returned to manage Chepstow Town, helping them avoid relegation from the Welsh League Division Three

He later returned to manage Chepstow for a third time in February 2006, again guiding them to Welsh League Division Three safety, but stepped down as manager in July 2006 at the age of 50, reportedly due to an impending knee operation.
