= Johnny Miller (footballer) =

English footballer

Personal information
- Full name: John Tony Miller
- Date of birth: 21 September 1950
- Place of birth: Ipswich, England
- Date of death: 18 February 2016 (aged 65)
- Place of death: Mansfield, England
- Height: 5 ft 8 in (1.73 m)
- Position: Right winger

Senior career*
Years	Team	Apps	(Gls)
1968–1974	Ipswich Town	51	(2)
1974–1976	Norwich City	23	(3)
1976–1980	Mansfield Town	113	(14)
1980–1982	Port Vale	26	(4)
- Oakham United
- Selston
Total		213+	(23+)
- * Club domestic league appearances and goals

John Tony Miller (21 September 1950 – 18 February 2016) was an English footballer, described by Jeff Kent as an "exciting right winger who provided pinpoint crosses". He scored 23 goals in 213 league games in a 14-year career in the Football League playing for Ipswich Town, Norwich City, Mansfield Town, and Port Vale. He was promoted out of the Second Division with Norwich City in 1974–75 and won the Third Division with Mansfield Town in 1976–77.

== Career ==
Miller began his career at Ipswich Town. The "Blues" finished 12th in the First Division in 1968–69 under the stewardship of Bobby Robson. They then went on to finish 18th in 1969–70, 19th in 1970–71, and 13th in 1971–72, before launching title challenges that ended with fourth-place finishes in 1972–73 and 1973–74. He scored two goals in 51 league appearances at Portman Road. He then switched to rivals Norwich City for a fee of £47,500, and helped John Bond's "Canaries" to win promotion out of the Second Division in 1974–75. He also appeared at Wembley Stadium in the 1975 League Cup final, where Norwich lost 1–0 to Aston Villa. They then posted a tenth-place finish in the top-flight in 1975–76. Miller scored three goals in 23 league games in his spell at Carrow Road.

Miller then dropped down to the Third Division with Mansfield Town, and helped Peter Morris's "Stags" to win promotion as champions in 1976–77. However, they were then relegated straight back down to the third tier in 1977–78. New boss Billy Bingham took the club to an 18th-place finish in 1978–79, before Mick Jones led Mansfield to relegation in 1979–80. He scored 14 goals in 113 league appearances at Field Mill. He initially joined Port Vale on trial in September 1980. He scored five goals in 31 appearances in the 1980–81 season and became a key first-team player at Vale Park as manager John McGrath began rebuilding the "Valiants" to challenge for promotion out of the Fourth Division. However, he was prevented from playing in the 1981–82 season due to a knee injury; this injury led to his retirement in March 1982. He later made a comeback with Oakham United, before moving on to Selston and taking up the assistant manager position at Blidworth Welfare. After leaving the game he worked as a taxi driver in Mansfield. He died in a hospital in Mansfield after a battle with cancer on 18 February 2016 at the age of 65.

== Career statistics ==
Appearances and goals by club, season and competition
Club	Season	League			FA Cup		Other		Total	
Club	Season	Division	Apps	Goals	Apps	Goals	Apps	Goals	Apps	Goals
Ipswich Town	1968–69	First Division	1	0	0	0	0	0	1	0
Ipswich Town	1969–70	First Division	1	0	0	0	0	0	1	0
Ipswich Town	1970–71	First Division	6	0	0	0	0	0	6	0
Ipswich Town	1971–72	First Division	30	1	2	0	1	0	33	1
Ipswich Town	1972–73	First Division	8	1	0	0	3	1	11	2
Ipswich Town	1973–74	First Division	5	0	0	0	3	1	8	1
Ipswich Town	Total		51	2	2	0	7	2	60	4
Norwich City	1974–75	Second Division	14	3	0	0	6	2	20	5
Norwich City	1975–76	First Division	9	0	0	0	0	0	9	0
Norwich City	Total		23	3	0	0	6	2	29	5
Mansfield Town	1976–77	Third Division	40	5	3	0	3	0	46	5
Mansfield Town	1977–78	Second Division	32	5	2	1	2	0	36	6
Mansfield Town	1978–79	Third Division	31	4	1	0	9	1	41	5
Mansfield Town	1979–80	Third Division	10	0	0	0	0	0	10	0
Mansfield Town	Total		113	14	6	1	14	1	133	16
Port Vale	1980–81	Fourth Division	26	4	5	1	0	0	31	5
Port Vale	1981–82	Fourth Division	0	0	0	0	0	0	0	0
Port Vale	Total		0	0	0	0	0	0	0	0
Career total			213	23	13	2	27	5	253	30

== Honours ==
Norwich City

- Football League Second Division third-place promotion: 1974–75
- Football League Cup runner-up: 1974–75

Mansfield Town

- Football League Third Division: 1976–77
