= 1973–74 Stoke City F.C. season =

Stoke City
1973–74 season
- Chairman: Albert Henshall
- Manager: Tony Waddington
- Stadium: Victoria Ground
- Football League First Division: 5th (46 Points)
- FA Cup: Third Round
- League Cup: Fourth Round
- Texaco Cup: First Round
- Watney Cup: Winners
- Top goalscorer: League: John Ritchie (14); All: Geoff Hurst & John Ritchie (15)
- Highest home attendance: 39,598 vs Leeds United (23 February 1974)
- Lowest home attendance: 13,843 vs Wolverhampton Wanderers (15 December 1973)
- Average home league attendance: 21,587
Home colours

The 1973–74 season was Stoke City's 67th season in the Football League and the 43rd in the First Division.

The season started well for Stoke as they won the short lived Watney Cup prior to the start of the new campaign. But their league form was poor and by January they were in the bottom six. But the signing of Alan Hudson from Chelsea sparked an upturn in results which accumulated in beating Leeds United 3–2 in February ending their 29 match un-beaten run. Stoke continued to climb the table and after remaining unbeaten in their final nine fixtures they took 5th position in the table and qualified for the UEFA Cup.

== Season review ==
=== League ===
Stoke, with no major summer signings, kicked off the 1973–74 season with George Eastham as assistant manager and the team got off to a fine start, winning the Watney Cup by beating Hull City 2–0 in the final. The opening league form though, was poor although there was a glimmer of hope as Nantwich born Dave Goodwin made a goal-scoring debut against West Ham United. By January 1974 Stoke were struggling in 17th position and the home support was slowly falling and Tony Waddington decided to sell the promising Stewart Jump to Malcolm Allison's Crystal Palace for £75,000 which raised a few questions from the supporters.

But there was method to the manager's apparent madness as he pulled off another major transfer swoop when he paid £240,000 for Chelsea's Alan Hudson. Hudson was an instant hit with the Stoke fans and in his debut against Liverpool he was named as man of the match, helping Stoke to a 1–1 draw. Stoke's next home match against Hudson's old team Chelsea was the first League match to be played on a Sunday, Stoke winning 1–0 in front of 31,985. Another big attendance, saw City's next home match against high-flying Leeds United who had gone 29 matches without defeat. At the time Don Revie's side were nine points clear at the top and they looked to be increasing their lead as they raced into a 2–0 lead, but Stoke rising to the challenge levelled before half time before Denis Smith grabbed the winner and Leeds' magnificent run was over, but they still took the First Division title. Stoke lost just twice in the final 23 matches and raised up the table to claim 5th place and so qualifying for next season's UEFA Cup.

=== FA Cup ===
Despite scoring twice at Bolton Wanderers Stoke lost 3–2 in the third round.

=== League Cup ===
After narrow wins over Chelsea and Middlesbrough, Coventry City knocked Stoke out with a narrow victory of their own.

== Final league table ==
Pos	Team	Pld	W	D	L	GF	GA	GAv	Pts	Qualification or relegation
3	Derby County	42	17	14	11	52	42	1.238	48	Qualification for the UEFA Cup first round
4	Ipswich Town	42	18	11	13	67	58	1.155	47	Qualification for the UEFA Cup first round
5	Stoke City	42	15	16	11	54	42	1.286	46	Qualification for the UEFA Cup first round
6	Burnley	42	16	14	12	56	53	1.057	46	
7	Everton	42	16	12	14	50	48	1.042	44	

Source: World Football
Rules for classification: 1) Points; 2) Goal average; 3) Goals scored

== Results ==
Stoke's score comes first

=== Legend ===
Win	Draw	Loss

=== Football League First Division ===
Match	Date	Opponent	Venue	Result	Attendance	Scorers
1	25 August 1973	Liverpool	A	0–1	52,938	
2	29 August 1973	Manchester United	A	0–1	43,614	
3	1 September 1973	Manchester City	H	1–1	22,436	Greenhoff 21'
4	5 September 1973	Everton	H	0–0	22,435	
5	8 September 1973	Queens Park Rangers	A	3–3	18,118	Hurst (2) 26', 67', Smith 64'
6	11 September 1973	Everton	A	1–1	20,242	Greenhoff 65'
7	15 September 1973	Ipswich Town	H	1–1	17,096	Hurst 72'
8	22 September 1973	Arsenal	A	1–2	30,578	Greenhoff 35'
9	29 September 1973	West Ham United	H	2–0	16,395	Goodwin 40', Hurst 68'
10	6 October 1973	Leeds United	A	1–1	36,562	Smith 89'
11	13 October 1973	Sheffield United	H	1–2	17,975	Colquhoun 30' (o.g.)
12	20 October 1973	Southampton	A	0–3	15,521	
13	27 October 1973	Coventry City	H	3–0	17,421	Greenhoff (2) 6', 75', Hurst 72' (pen)
14	3 November 1973	Newcastle United	A	1–2	27,941	Ritchie 52'
15	10 November 1973	Norwich City	H	2–0	15,363	Ritchie 33', Goodwin 87'
16	17 November 1973	Birmingham City	H	5–2	19,179	Ritchie (2) 10' 83', Robertson 25', Hurst 60', Mahoney 70'
17	24 November 1973	Burnley	A	0–1	14,478	
18	8 December 1973	Tottenham Hotspur	A	1–2	14,034	Ritchie 62'
19	15 December 1973	Wolverhampton Wanderers	H	2–3	13,843	Smith 63', Robertson 62'
20	22 December 1973	West Ham United	A	2–0	16,513	Robertson 49', Greenhoff 84'
21	26 December 1973	Derby County	H	0–0	24,045	
22	29 December 1973	Queens Park Rangers	H	4–1	18,910	Mahoney 49', Pejic 60', Ritchie 79', Greenhoff 85'
23	1 January 1974	Manchester City	A	0–0	35,009	
24	12 January 1974	Ipswich Town	A	1–1	18,581	Hurst 70'
25	19 January 1974	Liverpool	H	1–1	32,789	Hurst 67'
26	27 January 1974	Chelsea	H	1–0	31,985	Hurst 80' (pen)
27	2 February 1974	Wolverhampton Wanderers	A	1–1	30,128	Ritchie 68'
28	16 February 1974	Sheffield United	A	0–0	19,972	
29	23 February 1974	Leeds United	H	3–2	39,598	Pejic 27', Hudson 35', Smith 68'
30	2 March 1974	Derby County	A	1–1	28,176	Ritchie 55'
31	9 March 1974	Coventry City	A	0–2	25,136	
32	16 March 1974	Southampton	H	4–1	20,415	Hurst 13', Ritchie (3) 50', 75', 80'
33	23 March 1974	Norwich City	A	0–4	19,842	
34	30 March 1974	Arsenal	H	0–0	18,532	
35	3 April 1974	Newcastle United	H	2–1	16,437	Greenhoff 23', Mahoney 57'
36	6 April 1974	Burnley	H	4–0	19,253	Ritchie 28' 80' (2 pen), Greenhoff 31', Hudson 77'
37	13 April 1974	Birmingham City	A	0–0	29,467	
38	15 April 1974	Leicester City	H	1–0	21,468	Hurst 87'
39	16 April 1974	Leicester City	A	1–1	21,682	Hurst 40'
40	20 April 1974	Tottenham Hotspur	H	1–0	20,189	Haslegrave 44'
41	27 April 1974	Chelsea	A	1–0	17,150	Hudson 50'
42	29 April 1974	Manchester United	H	1–0	27,392	Ritchie 30'

=== FA Cup ===
Round	Date	Opponent	Venue	Result	Attendance	Scorers
R3	6 January 1974	Bolton Wanderers	A	2–3	39,138	Ritchie 65', Haslegrave 84'

=== League Cup ===
Round	Date	Opponent	Venue	Result	Attendance	Scorers
R2	8 October 1973	Chelsea	H	1–0	17,281	Smith 48'
R3	31 October 1973	Middlesbrough	H	1–1	19,194	Pejic 50'
R3 Replay	6 November 1973	Middlesbrough	A	2–1 (aet)	26,063	Greenhoff 39', Pejic 106'
R4	20 November 1973	Coventry City	A	1–2	17,483	Hurst 35'

=== Texaco Cup ===
Round	Date	Opponent	Venue	Result	Attendance	Scorers
R1 1st leg	19 September 1973	Birmingham City	H	0–0	9,530	
R1 2nd leg	2 October 1973	Birmingham City	A	0–0 (1–3 pens)	13,433	

=== Watney Cup ===
Round	Date	Opponent	Venue	Result	Attendance	Scorers
Quarter Final	11 August 1973	Plymouth Argyle	A	1–0	17,500	Hurst 62'
Semi Final	15 August 1973	Bristol City	H	4–1	13,812	Hurst, Pejic, Greenhoff, Conroy
Final	18 August 1973	Hull City	H	2–0	18,159	Greenhoff (2) 16', 67'

=== Friendlies ===
Game	Opponent	Venue	Result
1	Manchester United	H	1–2
2	Manchester City	A	1–3
3	Hamilton Academical	A	2–1
4	Anorthosis	A	7–1
5	Aris Limassol	A	3–2
6	EPA Larnaca	A	5–1
7	Levski Spartak	A	0–1

== Squad statistics ==
Pos.	Name	League		FA Cup		League Cup		Texaco Cup		Watney Cup		Total	
Pos.	Name	Apps	Goals	Apps	Goals	Apps	Goals	Apps	Goals	Apps	Goals	Apps	Goals
GK	(England) John Farmer	38	0	1	0	3	0	1	0	3	0	46	0
GK	(Scotland) Mike McDonald	4	0	0	0	1	0	1(1)	0	0	0	6(1)	0
DF	(England) Alan Bloor	27	0	1	0	0	0	0	0	3	0	31	0
DF	(England) Alan Dodd	31	0	1	0	4	0	2	0	0	0	38	0
DF	(England) Jackie Marsh	31	0	0	0	4	0	2	0	3	0	40	0
DF	(England) Mike Pejic	41	2	1	0	4	2	2	0	3	1	51	5
DF	(England) Eric Skeels	15	0	1	0	1	0	0	0	0(1)	0	17(1)	0
DF	(England) Denis Smith	41	4	1	0	3	1	2	0	3	0	50	5
MF	(Republic of Ireland) Terry Conroy	5(4)	0	0	0	0	0	2	0	3	1	10(4)	1
MF	(England) George Eastham	2	0	0	0	0	0	1	0	1	0	4	0
MF	(England) Sean Haslegrave	27	1	0(1)	1	4	0	2	0	3	0	36(1)	2
MF	(England) Alan Hudson	18	3	0	0	0	0	0	0	0	0	18	3
MF	(England) Stewart Jump	2(1)	0	0	0	1	0	0(1)	0	0	0	3(2)	0
MF	(England) Terry Lees	3(1)	0	0	0	0	0	0	0	0	0	3(1)	0
MF	(Wales) John Mahoney	35	3	1	0	4	0	1	0	3	0	44	3
MF	(England) Kenny Raper	0	0	0	0	0	0	0	0	0	0	0	0
MF	(Scotland) Jimmy Robertson	37	3	1	0	2	0	1	0	3	0	44	3
FW	(England) Dave Goodwin	4(1)	2	0	0	1	0	1	0	0	0	6(1)	2
FW	(England) Jimmy Greenhoff	39	9	1	0	4	1	1	0	2	3	47	13
FW	(England) Geoff Hurst	35	12	1	0	4	1	2	0	3	2	45	15
FW	(England) Ian Moores	1	0	0	0	0	0	0	0	0	0	1	0
FW	(England) John Ritchie	26(4)	14	1	1	4	0	2	0	0	0	33(4)	15
–	Own goals	–	1	–	0	–	0	–	0	–	0	–	1
