= Jimmy Grattan =

Northern Irish footballer

Personal information
- Full name: James Grattan
- Date of birth: 30 November 1958 (age 67)
- Place of birth: Belfast, Northern Ireland
- Position: Forward

Senior career*
Years	Team	Apps	(Gls)
1976–1978	Sunderland	0	(0)
1978–1979	→ Mansfield Town (loan)	1	(0)
1979–1985	Racing Jet		
1985–1986	ECAC Chaumont		
1986–1987	Istres		
1987	Linfield		
1988	Crusaders		
Total		1	(0)
- * Club domestic league appearances and goals

James Grattan (born 30 November 1958) is a Northern Irish former professional footballer who played in the Football League for Mansfield Town.
