= Brian Thompson (footballer, born 1952) =

English footballer

Personal information
- Full name: George Brian Thompson
- Date of birth: 7 August 1952 (age 74)
- Place of birth: Ashington, Northumberland, England
- Height: 5 ft 10 in (1.78 m)
- Positions: Striker; defender

Senior career*
| Years | Team | Apps | (Gls) |
| 1971– | Sunderland | 0 | (0) |
| 1973 | → York City (loan) | 6 | (0) |
| 1974–1979 | Yeovil Town | | |
| 1979–1980 | Mansfield Town | 9 | (0) |
- Maidstone United
| Total | | 15 | (0) |

International career
| 1979–1984 | England semi-pro | 15 | (0) |
- * Club domestic league appearances and goals

George Brian Thompson (born 7 August 1952), known as Brian Thompson, is an English former professional footballer who played as a striker or as a defender in the Football League for York City and Mansfield Town, in non-League football for Yeovil Town and Maidstone United, and was on the books of Sunderland without making a league appearance. He was capped 15 times by the semi-professional national team from 1979 to 1984.
