= Mike Coffey =

English footballer

Personal information
- Full name: Michael James Joseph Coffey
- Date of birth: 29 September 1958 (age 68)
- Place of birth: Liverpool, England
- Position: Midfielder

Senior career*
Years	Team	Apps	(Gls)
1977–1978	Everton	0	(0)
1978–1979	Mansfield Town	3	(0)
1979	Bangor City		
1979–1986	Stafford Rangers		
1986	Nuneaton Borough		
Total		3	(0)
- * Club domestic league appearances and goals

Michael James Joseph Coffey (born 29 September 1958) is an English former professional footballer who played in the Football League for Mansfield Town.
