= Pat Sharkey =

Northern Irish footballer

Personal information
- Full name: Patrick Gerald Walter Sharkey
- Date of birth: 26 August 1953 (age 73)
- Place of birth: Omagh, Northern Ireland
- Position: Midfielder

Senior career*
Years	Team	Apps	(Gls)
1970–1971	Sligo Rovers	3	(0)
1971–1973	Portadown	?	
1973–1977	Ipswich Town	18	(1)
1976–1977	→ Millwall (loan)	7	(0)
1977–1978	Mansfield Town	32	(5)
1978	Colchester United	6	(0)
1978–1980	Peterborough United	15	(0)
1980–1981	Portadown		
1981–1982	Po Chai Pills	11	(0)
1982–?	Portadown		
- Omagh Town

International career
1976	Northern Ireland	1	(0)
- * Club domestic league appearances and goals

Patrick Gerald Walter Sharkey (born 26 August 1953) is a former Northern Irish international footballer.

One of just a handful of Omagh-born players to play at the highest level, Pat Sharkey made his name as a teenager with Portadown after making three League appearances for Sligo Rovers in the 1970–71 League of Ireland season. Transferred to Ipswich Town in September 1973, he had to wait over two years for his League debut, Manchester City held 1–1 at Maine Road on 25 October 1975. Over the following two seasons Sharkey played 18 League games, scoring just once in a 2–1 win at Arsenal in April 1976. He was awarded his only cap against Scotland in May 1976. It was a disappointing match all round. Northern Ireland were again forced to play another "home" match in Glasgow despite the fact England, Wales, Sweden and Norway had all played in Belfast in the previous twelve months. Scotland, 2–0 up at half-time, cruised to an easy 3–0 win with Sharkey replaced after 61 minutes.

Never really established at Portman Road, Sharkey made his final top-flight appearance against Middlesbrough on 23 April 1977 and was released that summer. In August he signed with Mansfield Town who were embarking on their first ever season in Division Two. Despite a career best tally of five goals, including a penalty strike against England 'keeper Peter Shilton in a 2–1 win over Stoke, Sharkey couldn't help the Stags avoid instant relegation. New Mansfield boss Billy Bingham allowed Sharkey to leave Field Mill in the summer of 1978.

Bobby Roberts brought Sharkey to Colchester at the start of the 1978/79 campaign, and he got off to a bad start, missing a crucial penalty in a League Cup tie with Charlton. He never really established himself at Layer Road, his apparent lazy attitude not going down well, and was transferred to Peterborough United on transfer deadline day 1979.
