= Kenny Raper =

English footballer

Personal information
- Full name: Kenneth Raper
- Date of birth: 15 May 1956 (age 70)
- Place of birth: Stanley, County Durham, England
- Position: Midfielder

Senior career*
Years	Team	Apps	(Gls)
1973–1974	Stoke City	0	(0)
1977–1979	Torquay United	52	(8)
1979	Leek Town		
Total		52	(8)
- * Club domestic league appearances and goals

Kenneth Raper (born 15 May 1956) is an English former professional footballer who played in the Football League for Torquay United.

== Career ==
Raper was born in Stanley, County Durham and began his career with Stoke City. He failed to break into the first team at Stoke and joined Fourth Division side Torquay United in 1977 where he spent two seasons making 58 appearances before returning to Staffordshire with Leek Town.

== Career statistics ==
Club	Season	League			FA Cup		League Cup		Total	
Club	Season	Division	Apps	Goals	Apps	Goals	Apps	Goals	Apps	Goals
Stoke City	1973–74	First Division	0	0	0	0	0	0	0	0
Torquay United	1977–78	Fourth Division	31	7	0	0	3	0	34	7
Torquay United	1978–79	Fourth Division	21	1	1	0	2	0	24	1
Career total			52	8	1	0	5	0	58	8
