= Colin Foster (footballer, born 1952) =

English footballer

Personal information
- Date of birth: 26 December 1952 (age 73)
- Place of birth: Bulwell, England
- Position: Defender

Senior career*
Years	Team	Apps	(Gls)
1971–1979	Mansfield Town	205	(17)
1979–1981	Peterborough United	71	(5)
- * Club domestic league appearances and goals

Colin Foster (born 26 December 1952 in Bulwell, Nottinghamshire) is an English retired footballer who played as a central defender for Mansfield Town and Peterborough United.

Foster came through the ranks at Mansfield, and made his debut on 4 September 1971 against Plymouth Argyle, in the same game that his unrelated namesake Barry Foster also made his debut. Due to sharing the same name and being similar in appearance, the two were often assumed to be brothers.

Throughout his years at Field Mill, Foster formed a strong defensive partnership with Kevin Bird. He played 43 matches when Mansfield won the Division Four title in 1974-75, and was also almost ever-present when the Stags won Division Three in 1976-77. During the 1976-77 campaign, Foster also scored a career-best nine goals.

In 1979, after nine years at Field Mill, Foster moved to Peterborough United for a £13,000 transfer fee. In total, he played 241 first-team games for Mansfield and scored 19 goals. His spell at Peterborough lasted two years, and he later wound down his career with spells at non-league clubs Grantham Town, King's Lynn and Corby Town, where he was player-manager.

After his retirement from the game, Colin settled in the Peterborough area, where he works as a painter and decorator. His son Steve Foster also became a professional footballer, and played for Mansfield Town
