= Dennis Martin =

Scottish footballer

Personal information
- Date of birth: 27 October 1947 (age 79)
- Place of birth: Edinburgh, Scotland
- Position: Winger

Senior career*
Years	Team	Apps	(Gls)
- Kettering Town
1967–1970	West Bromwich Albion	16	(1)
1970–1977	Carlisle United	275	(48)
1978–1978	Newcastle United	11	(2)
1978–1979	Mansfield Town	46	(3)
- Kettering Town
Total		348	(54)
- * Club domestic league appearances and goals

Dennis Martin (born 27 October 1947) is a Scottish former footballer who played in the Football League for Carlisle United, Mansfield Town, Newcastle United and West Bromwich Albion.
