= Martin New =

English footballer

Personal information
- Full name: Martin Peter New
- Date of birth: 11 May 1959 (age 67)
- Place of birth: Swindon, England
- Position: Goalkeeper

Senior career*
Years	Team	Apps	(Gls)
1977–1978	Arsenal	0	(0)
1978–1980	Mansfield Town	21	(0)
1980–1981	Barnsley	24	(0)
1981–1982	→ Wigan Athletic (loan)	0	(0)
1982–1988	Burton Albion		
1988–1989	Nuneaton Borough		
1989–1990	Worksop Town		
1990	King's Lynn		
Total		45	(0)
- * Club domestic league appearances and goals

Martin Peter New (born 11 May 1959) is an English former professional footballer who played in the Football League for Barnsley and Mansfield Town.
