= Dave Goodwin =

English footballer (born 1954)

Personal information
- Full name: David Goodwin
- Date of birth: 15 October 1954 (age 72)
- Place of birth: Nantwich, England
- Position: Forward

Senior career*
Years	Team	Apps	(Gls)
1973–1977	Stoke City	26	(3)
1973	→ Miami Toros (loan)	8	(1)
1976–1977	→ Workington (loan)	7	(0)
1977–1980	Mansfield Town	46	(5)
1980–1981	Bury	4	(0)
1981–1982	Rochdale	39	(6)
1982–1983	Crewe Alexandra	7	(0)
1983–1984	Macclesfield Town	52	(10)
1984–1985	Witton Albion		
1985–1986	Macclesfield Town	18	(1)
Total		207	(26)
- * Club domestic league appearances and goals

David Goodwin (born 15 October 1954) is an English former footballer who played in the Football League for Bury, Crewe Alexandra, Mansfield Town, Rochdale, and Stoke City.

== Career ==
Goodwin was born in Nantwich and began his career with Stoke City where he made an impressive start scoring on his debut in a 2–0 home win over West Ham United at the start of the 1973–74 season. He played six more times for the "Potters" that season scoring in another 2–0 win at home to Norwich City. He spent the summer of 1974 playing in the United States with Miami Toros. He returned to the Victoria Ground in 1975–76 playing in four matches and then spent time out on loan at Workington playing seven times for the Borough Park side failing to find the net. He returned to Stoke and played in 13 matches in 1976–77 scoring in a 1–0 win away at Ipswich Town as Stoke were relegated at the end of the season. After failing to establish himself in George Eastham's side he was sold to Mansfield Town.

With the "Stags" Goodwin played 60 times scoring eight goals in three seasons with saw Mansfield be relegated from the Second Division to Fourth. He then had one season spells with Bury, Rochdale and Crewe Alexandra ending his career with non-league Macclesfield.

== Career statistics ==
Club	Season	League			FA Cup		League Cup		Other^{[A]}		Total	
Club	Season	Division	Apps	Goals	Apps	Goals	Apps	Goals	Apps	Goals	Apps	Goals
Stoke City	1973–74	First Division	5	2	0	0	1	0	1	0	7	2
Stoke City	1974–75	First Division	0	0	0	0	0	0	—		0	0
Stoke City	1975–76	First Division	4	0	0	0	0	0	—		4	0
Stoke City	1976–77	First Division	13	1	0	0	0	0	—		13	1
Stoke City	1977–78	Second Division	4	0	0	0	1	0	—		5	0
Stoke City	Total		26	3	0	0	2	0	1	0	29	3
Miami Toros (loan)	1973	North American Soccer League	8	1	—		—		—		8	1
Workington (loan)	1976–77	Fourth Division	7	0	0	0	0	0	—		7	0
Mansfield Town	1977–78	Second Division	15	1	2	0	0	0	—		17	1
Mansfield Town	1978–79	Third Division	27	4	1	0	0	0	5	3	33	7
Mansfield Town	1979–80	Third Division	4	0	0	0	2	0	2	0	8	0
Mansfield Town	Total		46	5	3	0	2	0	7	3	58	8
Bury	1980–81	Fourth Division	4	0	0	0	0	0	2	0	6	0
Rochdale	1981–82	Fourth Division	39	6	1	0	1	0	—		41	6
Crewe Alexandra	1982–83	Fourth Division	7	0	0	0	2	0	—		9	0
Macclesfield Town	1982–83	Northern Premier League	13	3	0	0	—		5	1	18	4
Macclesfield Town	1983–84	Northern Premier League	27	5	4	1	—		5	0	36	6
Macclesfield Town	1984–85	Northern Premier League	12	2	1	0	—		4	0	17	2
Macclesfield Town	1985–86	Northern Premier League	18	1	0	0	—		10	3	28	4
Macclesfield Town	Total		70	11	5	1	—		24	4	99	16
Career Total			207	26	9	1	7	0	34	7	257	34

A. The "Other" column constitutes appearances and goals in the Anglo-Scottish Cup, Texaco Cup.
