= Mick Saxby =

English footballer

Personal information
- Full name: Mick Saxby
- Date of birth: 12 August 1957 (age 69)
- Place of birth: Clipstone, England
- Position: Defender

Senior career*
Years	Team	Apps	(Gls)
1975–1979	Mansfield Town	79	(5)
1979–1982	Luton Town	82	(6)
1982–1983	→ Grimsby Town (loan)	10	(0)
1983–1984	→ Lincoln City (loan)	10	(1)
1984–1985	Newport County	6	(0)
1985–1986	Middlesbrough	15	(0)
- Oakham United
Total		202	(12)
- * Club domestic league appearances and goals

Mick Saxby (born 12 August 1957) is an English former footballer who played in the Football League for Mansfield Town, Luton Town, Grimsby Town, Lincoln City, Newport County and Middlesbrough.
