= Billy McEwan (footballer, born 1951) =

Scottish footballer and manager (1951–2022)

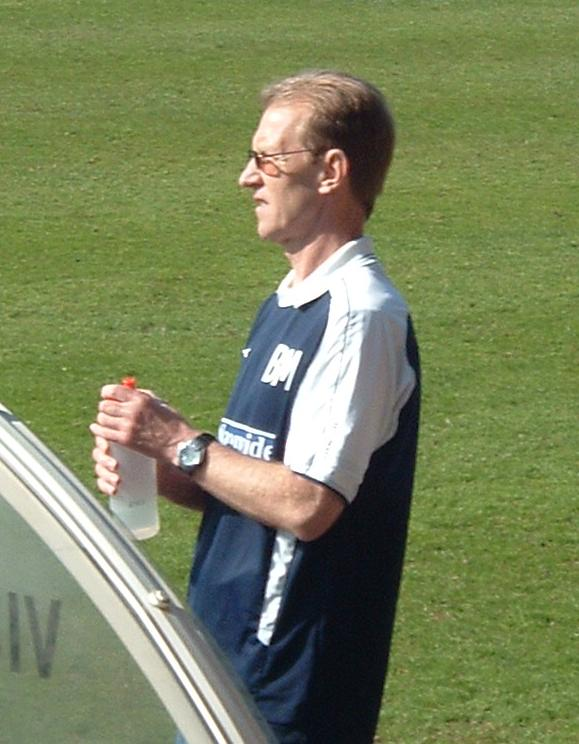
- McEwan managing York City in 2007

Personal information
- Full name: William Johnston McGowan McEwan
- Date of birth: 20 June 1951
- Place of birth: Cleland, Scotland
- Date of death: 17 February 2022 (aged 70)
- Height: 5 ft 10 in (1.78 m)
- Position: Midfielder

Youth career
- -1969: Pumpherston Juniors

Senior career*
Years	Team	Apps	(Gls)
1969–1973	Hibernian	60	(2)
1973	Blackpool	4	(0)
1974	Brighton & Hove Albion	27	(3)
1974–1975	Chesterfield	80	(7)
1976–1977	Mansfield Town	32	(3)
1977–1979	Peterborough United	63	(3)
1979–1983	Rotherham United	95	(10)
Total		361	(28)

Managerial career
- 1986–1988: Sheffield United
- 1988–1991: Rotherham United
- 1992–1993: Darlington
- 1995: Derby County (caretaker)
- 2002: Derby County (caretaker)
- 2005–2007: York City
- 2008: Mansfield Town
- 2010–2011: Antigua Barracuda
- * Club domestic league appearances and goals

William Johnston McGowan McEwan (20 June 1951 – 17 February 2022) was a Scottish professional football player and manager. He had a 14-year playing career in the Scottish and English professional leagues, playing for seven different clubs. McEwan then undertook a coaching career; he managed six different English league clubs, plus one club on a caretaker basis twice. McEwan was most recently the manager of Antigua Barracuda but left the post in 2011.

== Early life ==
William Johnston McGowan McEwan was born on 20 June 1951 in Cleland, Lanarkshire.

== Playing career ==
McEwan started his playing career as a midfielder with Scottish non-League side Pumpherston Juniors before joining Hibernian in 1969, making 60 appearances and scoring two goals for the Edinburgh club. McEwan left Hibernian in May 1973 to join Blackpool, and went on to play for Brighton & Hove Albion, Chesterfield, Mansfield Town, Peterborough United and Rotherham United whom he left in the 1982–83 season.

== Managerial career ==
McEwan's first coaching appointment was at Sheffield United after he replaced Ian Porterfield as manager on 27 March 1986. The following season Sheffield United finished ninth in Second Division after an unspectacular season. More disappointing performances in the 1987–88 season followed, and McEwan was forced to resign before taking over as manager of Rotherham United and guided them to the Fourth Division championship in the 1988–89 season. McEwan later had a spell as manager at Darlington, but he was replaced by Alan Murray midway through his second season.

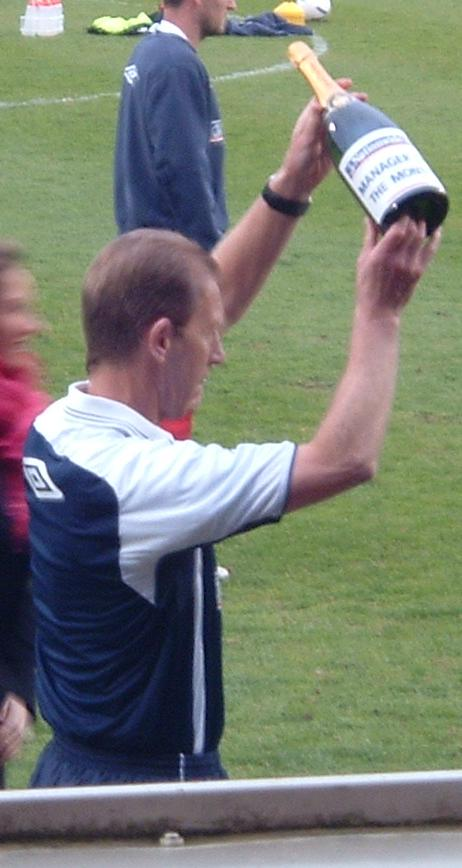
McEwan was named the Conference National Manager of the Month for April 2007

McEwan then spent nine years on the coaching team at Derby County. He was caretaker manager there twice in April to June 1995 and in January 2002, after the sackings of Roy McFarland and Colin Todd respectively. In 2003, he was sacked by the then manager John Gregory, but was restored into the post when he was found to have been unfairly dismissed. Altogether he was on the coaching staff under five managers at Derby. He left Derby on 19 October 2004, saying "I am looking for a new challenge. The time was right for me to move on".

McEwan was appointed manager of York City on 10 February 2005, where in his first full season he achieved a position of eighth in the Conference National. McEwan said that he rejected an offer from an unnamed Football League club to take over as their manager in October 2005. During October 2006, he threatened to walk out on the club if the fans were not satisfied with his efforts.

McEwan issued a public apology to York's supporters and on loan West Bromwich Albion striker Rob Elvins after the team's home defeat to Conference bottom club Tamworth on 3 February 2007. McEwan was named Conference National Manager of the Month for April 2007, but was then sacked by York on 19 November 2007.

McEwan was linked with the managerial vacancy at Mansfield Town in March 2008, and he was appointed as manager on a three-year contract on 4 July 2008. He was sacked by the club on 10 December 2008.

McEwan was appointed technical director of the Antigua and Barbuda Football Association in March 2010, and in April was made manager of Antigua Barracuda. He left this position in March 2011.

== Personal life and death ==
McEwan was diagnosed with Parkinson's disease in 2014. He died on 17 February 2022, at the age of 70.

== Managerial statistics ==
Managerial record by team and tenure
Team	From	To	Record					Ref.
Team	From	To	P	W	D	L	Win %	Ref.
Sheffield United	27 March 1986	2 January 1988	86	27	25	34	31.4	
Rotherham United	1 April 1988	1 January 1991	141	52	40	49	36.9	
Darlington	1 May 1992	4 October 1993	57	13	19	25	22.8	
Derby County (caretaker)	29 April 1995	15 June 1995	1	0	0	1	0.0	
Derby County (caretaker)	14 January 2002	30 January 2002	2	0	0	2	0.0	
York City	10 February 2005	19 November 2007	131	52	31	48	39.7	
Mansfield Town	4 July 2008	10 December 2008	26	8	6	12	30.8	
Total			444	152	121	171	34.2	

== Honours ==
=== As a player ===
Hibernian

- Scottish League Cup: 1972–73
- Drybrough Cup: 1971–72, 1972–73

Mansfield Town

- Football League Third Division: 1976–77

=== As a manager ===
Rotherham United

- Football League Fourth Division: 1988–89
