= Terry Austin (footballer) =

English footballer (born 1954)

Personal information
- Full name: Terence Willis Austin
- Date of birth: 1 February 1954 (age 72)
- Place of birth: Isleworth, England
- Height: 6 ft 1 in (1.85 m)
- Position: Striker

Senior career*
Years	Team	Apps	(Gls)
1972–1973	Crystal Palace	0	(0)
1974–1976	Ipswich Town	19	(1)
1976–1978	Plymouth Argyle	58	(18)
1978–1979	Walsall	47	(19)
1979–1980	Mansfield Town	84	(31)
1980–1983	Huddersfield Town	42	(10)
1983	Doncaster Rovers	34	(5)
1983–1984	Northampton Town	43	(10)
- * Club domestic league appearances and goals

Terence Willis Austin (born 1 February 1954) is an English former professional footballer.

He started playing at Crystal Palace for their juniors, but in May 1973 was sold to Ipswich Town. He stayed with Town for three years, before moving to Plymouth Argyle in October 1976. Almost eighteen months later, he was transferred to Walsall in March 1978, and from there, he moved to Mansfield Town, where he had his most productive spell, appearing 84 times, and scoring 31 goals. In December 1980 he moved again to Huddersfield Town where he played for two years. He was sold to Doncaster Rovers in September 1982, and from there, he transferred in August 1983 to Northampton Town where he finished his professional playing career.

He returned to Mansfield once his playing days were over, where he became a financial advisor.

Austin is now semi-retired and spends much of his time at second home in Gran Canaria.
