= Russell Allen (footballer) =

English footballer

Personal information
- Date of birth: 9 January 1954 (age 72)
- Place of birth: Smethwick, England
- Height: 5 ft 9 in (1.75 m)
- Position: Forward

Youth career
- Arsenal

Senior career*
Years	Team	Apps	(Gls)
1971–1973	West Bromwich Albion	0	(0)
1973–1978	Tranmere Rovers	156	(44)
1975	→ Chicago Sting (loan)	16	(4)
1978–1981	Mansfield Town	116	(18)
- Boston United
Total		286	(66)
- * Club domestic league appearances and goals

Russell Allen (born 9 January 1954) is an English former footballer who played as a forward for West Bromwich Albion, Tranmere Rovers, Mansfield Town, and Boston United.

He was the son of England international striker Ronnie Allen.

== Playing career ==
Allen, a former Arsenal apprentice, turned professional at West Bromwich Albion in 1971. He never played a First Division game for Don Howe's side, and was allowed to join Third Division side Tranmere Rovers in 1973, then managed by Ron Yeats. Rovers were relegated in 1974–75, but promoted straight out of the Fourth Division in 1975–76, under the stewardship of John King. Allen played 156 games for Tranmere, scoring 44 goals. He also played for Chicago Sting in the NASL.

Allen joined Mansfield Town in 1978, who had suffered relegation out of the Second Division in 1977–78. Narrowly avoiding the drop in 1978–79, the "Stags" finished four points short of safety in 1979–80, and Allen left the club after spending 1980–81 in the fourth tier. He played a total of 134 games for the club, scoring 21 goals. He moved on to Boston United of the Alliance Premier League.

== Honours ==
with Tranmere Rovers

- Football League Fourth Division fourth place promotion winner: 1975–76
