= Bob Curtis (footballer) =

English footballer

Personal information
- Full name: Robert Dennis Curtis
- Date of birth: 25 January 1950
- Place of birth: Langwith, England
- Date of death: 19 March 2010 (aged 60)
- Height: 5 ft 9 1/2 in (1.77 m)
- Position: Defender

Senior career*
Years	Team	Apps	(Gls)
1967–1978	Charlton Athletic	337	(35)
1978–1980	Mansfield Town	73	(7)
1980–1981	Kettering Town		
- * Club domestic league appearances and goals

Robert Dennis Curtis (25 January 1950 – 19 March 2010) was an English footballer who played as a right full back, most notably for Charlton Athletic. He also represented Mansfield Town and Kettering Town.

Bob was born in Langwith Whaley-Thorns in Nottinghamshire and was scouted by Charlton Athletic whilst playing as a striker for local side Shirebrook Town. He signed for Charlton in February 1967, and was given his chance in the first team after Billy Bonds had been sold to West Ham United.

Curtis represented Charlton Athletic for 12 seasons, and in that time, he made 337 league appearances for the Addicks, and scored 35 goals. He was famously once expelled from the England under-23 squad after he dyed his hair blonde, to make him look like his idol Bobby Moore.

After a disagreement with the Charlton management staff, Curtis was sold to Mansfield Town in his native East Midlands for an undisclosed fee in March 1978. During his time with the Stags, he made 73 league appearances for the club, and 87 in all competitions, scoring seven goals. An achilles injury forced him to retire from full-time football in 1980, and he subsequently played one season for non-league Kettering Town before hanging up his boots in 1981.

Curtis died in March 2010, aged 60, after a lengthy battle against motor neurone disease (known as Lou Gehrig's disease or ALS in North America).
