= Dave Syrett =

English footballer (1956–2016)

Personal information
- Date of birth: 20 January 1956
- Place of birth: Salisbury, England
- Date of death: 26 July 2016 (aged 60)
- Place of death: Salisbury, England
- Position: Forward

Senior career*
Years	Team	Apps	(Gls)
1973–1977	Swindon Town	122	(30)
1977–1978	Mansfield Town	65	(20)
1978–1979	Walsall	11	(3)
1979–1982	Peterborough United	79	(23)
1982–1984	Northampton Town	44	(13)
- Salisbury City
Total		321	(89)

International career
1974	England Youth	3	(0)
- * Club domestic league appearances and goals

Dave Syrett (20 January 1956 – 26 July 2016) was an English footballer who played in the Football League for Swindon Town, Mansfield Town, Walsall, Peterborough United, and Northampton Town.

Syrett died on 26 July 2016 in Salisbury, England from a brain tumour. He was 60.
