= Peter Morris (English footballer) =

English footballer and manager

Personal information
- Full name: Peter John Morris
- Date of birth: 8 November 1943 (age 82)
- Place of birth: Shirebrook, England
- Position: Midfielder

Youth career
- Mansfield Town

Senior career*
Years	Team	Apps	(Gls)
1960–1968	Mansfield Town	287	(50)
1968–1974	Ipswich Town	220	(13)
1974–1976	Norwich City	66	(1)
1976	Mansfield Town	41	(3)
1979	Peterborough United	1	(0)
Total		615	(67)

Managerial career
- 1976–1978: Mansfield Town
- 1979–1982: Peterborough United
- 1982–1983: Crewe Alexandra
- 1983–1984: Southend United
- 1985–1986: Nuneaton Borough
- 1988–1992: Kettering Town
- 1992–1994: Boston United
- 1995–1998: King's Lynn
- 1998–2001: Kettering Town
- 2002–2003: King's Lynn
- * Club domestic league appearances and goals

Peter John Morris (born 8 November 1943 in Shirebrook) is an English former professional footballer and manager. During his career he made over 300 appearances for Mansfield Town and over 200 for Ipswich Town. His one goal for Norwich City was scored against title-chasing Queens Park Rangers on 17 April 1976. He was also a manager with numerous league and non-league clubs, and notably was player-manager when Mansfield Town were promoted to the Second Division in 1976–77.

== Honours ==
Norwich City

- Football League Cup runner-up: 1974–75
