= Kevin Randall (footballer) =

English footballer and manager (1945–2019)

Personal information
- Full name: Kevin Randall
- Date of birth: 20 August 1945
- Place of birth: Ashton-under-Lyne, England
- Date of death: 28 March 2019 (aged 73)
- Position: Striker

Senior career*
Years	Team	Apps	(Gls)
1965	Bury	4	(0)
1966–1972	Chesterfield	258	(96)
1972–1976	Notts County	121	(39)
1975–1978	Mansfield Town	66	(20)
1977–1981	York City	107	(27)
Total		556	(182)

Managerial career
- 1981–1982: York City
- 1987–1988: Chesterfield
- * Club domestic league appearances and goals

Kevin Randall (20 August 1945 – 28 March 2019) was an English football player and manager. Randall joined up with Neil Warnock at Leeds in the summer of 2012 having previously worked under Warnock as chief scout at Sheffield United, Crystal Palace and Q.P.R.

Randall died on 28 March 2019. His death was announced on the Twitter page of his former club, Chesterfield.

== Managerial statistics ==
Team	Nat	From	To	Record				
Team	Nat	From	To	G	W	L	D	Win %
York City	(England)	1 December 1981	3 March 1982	12	1	7	4	8.33
Chesterfield	(England)	25 June 1987	16 October 1988	62	18	32	12	29.03
