= Barry Foster (footballer) =

English footballer

Personal information
- Full name: Barry Foster
- Date of birth: 21 September 1951 (age 75)
- Place of birth: Worksop, England
- Height: 5 ft 9 in (1.75 m)
- Position: Defender

Senior career*
Years	Team	Apps	(Gls)
1971–1982	Mansfield Town	287	(0)
1982–1983	Boston United	14	(0)
- * Club domestic league appearances and goals

Barry Foster (born 21 September 1951) is an English retired footballer who spent his entire Football League career at Mansfield Town, where he played as a left-back.

Foster graduated through Mansfield's youth team, and signed a professional contract in July 1970, after first completing his apprenticeship as a mining electrician. He made his first-team debut for the Stags shortly before his 19th birthday, on 4 September 1971 against Plymouth Argyle. Incidentally, his unrelated namesake Colin Foster made his debut in the same game.

At first, Foster had to bide his time in a reserve role, but when first-choice left-back Clive Walker went down with an injury, Foster took advantage of the opportunity, and secured a regular place in the side. He was a member of the Mansfield side that finished top of Division Four in 1975, and also won Division Three two years later. However, Foster broke his leg against Portsmouth on the day promotion was confirmed, causing him to miss most of the club's Division Two campaign the following season.

In total, Foster played 343 matches for Mansfield in all competitions, without ever scoring a single goal for the club. He was released at the end of the 1981-82 season, and finished his career with a season at non-league Boston United. After retiring from the game, he joined his family's market-trading business.
