= Rod Arnold =

English footballer

Personal information
- Full name: Roderick James Arnold
- Date of birth: 3 June 1952 (age 74)
- Place of birth: Wolverhampton, England
- Height: 5 ft 10 in (1.78 m)
- Position: Goalkeeper

Senior career*
Years	Team	Apps	(Gls)
1970–1973	Wolverhampton Wanderers	0	(0)
1971	→ Mansfield Town (loan)	17	(0)
1973–1984	Mansfield Town	423	(0)
Total		440	(0)
- * Club domestic league appearances and goals

Roderick James Arnold (born 3 June 1952) is an English former football goalkeeper who spent the majority of his career at Mansfield Town, having started his career at Wolverhampton Wanderers. With 513 first-team appearances for Mansfield (440 in the league), he is the holder of the club's all-time appearance record.

== Career ==
Arnold began his career at his hometown club Wolverhampton Wanderers, where he signed his first professional contract in June 1970, and was the club's reserve goalkeeper behind Phil Parkes, but never played any competitive first-team games for Wolves.

In February 1971, he joined Mansfield Town on loan, keeping a clean sheet in his debut against Fulham on 6 February 1971. He played 17 league games for the Stags in his first spell at the club, and subsequently returned to Wolverhampton.

In 1973, Arnold rejoined Mansfield on a permanent basis, and remained the team's first-choice goalkeeper for the next decade. He was a member of the Mansfield teams that won the Fourth Division title in 1975 and the Third Division championship in 1977.

Arnold left Mansfield, and retired from the game in 1984. He has since worked as a goalkeeping coach for Hull City. In recent years he has worked as an MC in one of Hull City's hospitality suites during home games.
