= Kevin Bird =

English footballer (1952–2023)

Personal information
- Date of birth: 7 August 1952
- Place of birth: Doncaster, England
- Date of death: 15 February 2023 (aged 70)
- Height: 5 ft 9 in (1.75 m)
- Position: Defender

Youth career
- Doncaster Rovers

Senior career*
Years	Team	Apps	(Gls)
1972–1983	Mansfield Town	450	(63)
1983–1984	Huddersfield Town	1	(0)
Total		451	(63)
- * Club domestic league appearances and goals

Kevin Bird (7 August 1952 – 15 February 2023) was an English professional footballer who played as a defender for Mansfield Town and Huddersfield Town.

== Career ==
Born in Doncaster, Bird began his career as an apprentice at his hometown club Doncaster Rovers, but was released in 1972, without making a senior appearance for the team. He then moved to Mansfield Town, on the recommendation of Mansfield assistant manager Frank Marshall who had previously been on Doncaster's coaching staff. Bird initially joined Mansfield on a trial basis, and played well enough to earn himself a contract, and became a mainstay in the Stags' central defence for the next eleven seasons. He made his Mansfield debut in a Division Four match against Chester City on 21 October 1972.

In his eleven seasons at Field Mill, Bird played 450 first-team games, placing him fourth on Mansfield's all-time appearance list, and scored 63 goals. He was a member of the Mansfield teams that won the Division Four title in 1974–75, and the Division Three title two years later.

His final match in the Mansfield shirt came in the 3–2 defeat against Peterborough United on 7 May 1983. Bird scored one of Mansfield's goals in that game. Two days later, he got his testimonial against Aston Villa at Field Mill in front of a 2,903 crowd.

In the summer of 1983, Bird signed for Huddersfield Town but only played once for Huddersfield. He retired from professional football at the end of the season, and moved back to the Mansfield area, where he played for several local non-league teams before hanging up his boots for good. He lived in Mansfield Woodhouse after retirement. He suffered from dementia which was believed to be associated with heading of footballs over the years.

In May 2009 it was announced that the executive suite at the Mansfield Town ground would be renamed 'The Kevin Bird Suite' from 27 May 2009. Bird died at a Mansfield nursing home on 15 February 2023, at the age of 70.
