= 1974–75 Mansfield Town F.C. season =

Mansfield Town
1974–75 season
- Manager: Dave Smith
- Stadium: Field Mill
- Fourth Division: 1st
- FA Cup: Fifth Round
- League Cup: First Round
Away colours

The 1974–75 season was Mansfield Town's 38th season in the Football League and 6th in the Fourth Division, they finished in 1st position with 68 points, gaining a return to the Third Division.

== Final league table ==
Pos	Team	Pld	W	D	L	GF	GA	GAv	Pts	Promotion or relegation
1	Mansfield Town (C, P)	46	28	12	6	90	40	2.250	68	Promotion to the Third Division
2	Shrewsbury Town (P)	46	26	10	10	80	43	1.860	62	Promotion to the Third Division
3	Rotherham United (P)	46	22	15	9	71	41	1.732	59	Promotion to the Third Division
4	Chester (P)	46	23	11	12	64	38	1.684	57	Promotion to the Third Division
5	Lincoln City	46	21	15	10	79	48	1.646	57	

Source: rsssf.com
(C) Champions; (P) Promoted

== Results ==
=== Football League Fourth Division ===
Match	Date	Opponent	Venue	Result	Attendance	Scorers
1	17 August 1974	Southport	H	2–1	3,109	O'Connor, Foster
2	24 August 1974	Scunthorpe United	A	1–0	2,918	Clarke
3	30 August 1974	Rochdale	H	2–0	3,779	Clarke, O'Connor
4	7 September 1974	Exeter City	A	1–0	3,276	Eccles
5	14 September 1974	Crewe Alexandra	H	0–0	4,432	
6	20 September 1974	Stockport County	A	2–3	2,512	Matthews, Lathan
7	24 September 1974	Cambridge United	A	2–2	3,627	Hodgson, Clarke
8	27 September 1974	Chester	H	0–0	3,189	
9	1 October 1974	Swansea City	A	2–1	2,273	Clarke (2)
10	5 October 1974	Darlington	H	4–2	3,400	Clarke, Kruse, Laverick
11	7 October 1974	Swansea City	H	3–0	3,672	Clarke, Laverick, McCaffrey
12	12 October 1974	Workington	A	3–1	1,309	Hodgson, McCaffrey (2)
13	15 October 1974	Barnsley	A	3–1	4,923	Clarke (2), Lathan
14	19 October 1974	Reading	H	1–1	5,295	Hodgson
15	21 October 1974	Barnsley	H	2–1	5,291	Hodgson, Clarke
16	26 October 1974	Hartlepool	A	1–2	2,923	Clarke
17	28 October 1974	Northampton Town	H	3–0	5,310	Clarke, Foster, Eccles
18	2 November 1974	Bradford City	H	3–0	5,147	Clarke (2), Lathan
19	9 November 1974	Brentford	A	3–2	5,553	Clarke, McCaffrey, Bird
20	16 November 1974	Doncaster Rovers	H	5–2	5,634	Clarke (3), Eccles, Bird
21	30 November 1974	Torquay United	A	2–0	2,979	Eccles, Matthews
22	7 December 1974	Shrewsbury Town	H	3–1	10,070	Lathan (2), Eccles
23	21 December 1974	Rotherham United	H	1–1	8,559	Hodgson
24	26 December 1974	Crewe Alexandra	H	2–0	2,571	Hodgson, Bird
25	28 December 1974	Newport County	H	3–0	7,943	Eccles (2), Clarke
26	11 January 1975	Shrewsbury Town	A	1–0	8,913	McCaffrey
27	18 January 1975	Torquay United	H	3–0	7,549	Clarke, Eccles (2)
28	1 February 1975	Brentford	H	1–1	11,362	Eccles
29	8 February 1975	Bradford City	A	1–1	4,970	Hodgson
30	22 February 1975	Doncaster Rovers	A	3–4	7,278	Eccles (2), Foster
31	25 February 1975	Lincoln City	A	0–0	13,108	
32	1 March 1975	Rochdale	A	1–0	2,317	Clarke
33	7 March 1975	Cambridge United	H	2–1	9,174	Clarke, Eccles
34	15 March 1975	Chester	A	0–0	7,706	
35	18 March 1975	Southport	A	1–1	2,204	McCaffrey
36	21 March 1975	Exeter City	H	3–2	8,503	Griffin, Lathan, Bird
37	25 March 1975	Northampton Town	A	2–0	3,846	Griffin, Hodgson
38	29 March 1975	Rotherham United	A	1–2	11,669	Clarke
39	31 March 1975	Newport County	A	1–2	3,662	Eccles
40	1 April 1975	Stockport County	H	1–1	10,245	Eccles
41	5 April 1975	Hartlepool	H	2–0	8,860	Clarke, Hodgson
42	12 April 1975	Darlington	A	1–2	2,827	Clarke
43	14 April 1975	Lincoln City	H	3–1	14,392	Clarke, Bird, Lathan
44	19 April 1975	Workington	H	1–0	9,754	Eccles
45	21 April 1975	Scunthorpe United	H	7–0	11,020	Eccles, Clarke (2), Bird, Lathan (2), Hodgson
46	26 April 1975	Reading	A	1–1	5,559	Bird

=== FA Cup ===
Round	Date	Opponent	Venue	Result	Attendance	Scorers
R1	23 November 1974	Wrexham	H	3–1	7,443	Eccles (2), McCaffrey
R2	14 December 1974	Wigan Athletic	A	1–1	15,560	Eccles
R2 Replay	16 December 1974	Wigan Athletic	H	3–1	11,209	O'Connor (2), Hodgson
R3	4 January 1975	Cambridge United	H	1–0	10,486	Clarke
R4	25 January 1975	Bury	A	2–1	16,623	Clarke, McCaffrey
R5	15 February 1975	Carlisle United	H	0–1	18,293	

=== League Cup ===
Round	Date	Opponent	Venue	Result	Attendance	Scorers
R1	20 August 1974	Doncaster Rovers	A	1–2	3,078	O'Connor

== Squad statistics ==
- Squad list sourced from 1974–75 Mansfield Town F.C. season at the English National Football Archive (subscription required)

Pos.	Name	League		FA Cup		League Cup		Total	
Pos.	Name	Apps	Goals	Apps	Goals	Apps	Goals	Apps	Goals
GK	(England) Rod Arnold	46	0	6	0	1	0	53	0
DF	(England) Kevin Bird	28	7	6	0	1	0	35	7
DF	(England) Barry Foster	40	0	6	0	1	0	47	0
DF	(England) Colin Foster	42(1)	3	6	0	1	0	49(1)	3
DF	(England) Pat Kruse	6	1	0	0	0	0	6	1
DF	(Scotland) Sandy Pate	46	0	6	0	1	0	53	0
DF	(England) Lawrie Madden	6(1)	0	0	0	0	0	6(1)	0
DF	(England) Andy Shore	1	0	0	0	0	0	1	0
DF	(England) John Tones	3	0	0	0	0	0	3	0
DF	(England) Clive Walker	9(6)	0	0	0	1	0	10(6)	0
MF	(England) Gordon Hodgson	44	10	6	1	1	0	51	11
MF	(England) John Lathan	45	9	6	0	0	0	51	9
MF	(England) Micky Laverick	9(2)	3	0(1)	0	1	0	10(3)	3
MF	(Wales) David Llewellyn	6(2)	0	0	0	0	0	6(2)	0
MF	(England) Paul Matthews	44	2	6	0	0	0	50	2
MF	(England) Jim McCaffrey	37(2)	6	6	2	0(1)	0	43(3)	8
FW	(England) Ray Clarke	46	28	6	2	1	0	53	30
FW	(England) Terry Eccles	32	17	5	3	1	0	38	20
FW	(England) Kevin Griffin	4	2	0	0	0	0	4	2
FW	(England) Dave Hailwood	1	0	0	0	0	0	1	0
FW	(England) Doug O'Connor	11(6)	2	1	2	1	1	13(6)	5
