= 1975–76 Mansfield Town F.C. season =

Mansfield Town
1975–76 season
- Manager: Dave Smith
- Stadium: Field Mill
- Third Division: 11th
- FA Cup: Second Round
- League Cup: Fifth Round
- Anglo-Scottish Cup: Semi-final
Home colours

The 1975–76 season was Mansfield Town's 39th season in the Football League and 12th in the Third Division, they finished in 11th position with 47 points.

== Final league table ==
| Pos | Team | Pld | W | D | L | GF | GA | GAv | Pts |
|---|---|---|---|---|---|---|---|---|---|
| 9 | Shrewsbury Town | 46 | 19 | 10 | 17 | 61 | 59 | 1.034 | 48 |
| 10 | Peterborough United | 46 | 15 | 18 | 13 | 63 | 63 | 1.000 | 48 |
| 11 | Mansfield Town | 46 | 16 | 15 | 15 | 58 | 52 | 1.115 | 47 |
| 12 | Port Vale | 46 | 15 | 16 | 15 | 55 | 54 | 1.019 | 46 |
| 13 | Bury | 46 | 14 | 16 | 16 | 51 | 46 | 1.109 | 44 |

Rules for classification: 1) Points; 2) Goal average; 3) Goals scored

== Results ==
=== Football League Third Division ===
| Match | Date | Opponent | Venue | Result | Attendance | Scorers |
|---|---|---|---|---|---|---|
| 1 | 16 August 1975 | Shrewsbury Town | H | 1–2 | 7,073 | McDonald |
| 2 | 23 August 1975 | Colchester United | A | 2–0 | 3,333 | Bird, Clarke |
| 3 | 30 August 1975 | Chester | H | 1–1 | 6,167 | McDonald |
| 4 | 6 September 1975 | Aldershot | A | 1–2 | 3,289 | Hodgson |
| 5 | 13 September 1975 | Cardiff City | H | 1–4 | 6,684 | Eccles |
| 6 | 20 September 1975 | Gillingham | A | 1–3 | 5,635 | Eccles |
| 7 | 23 September 1975 | Bury | A | 1–2 | 5,635 | McDonald |
| 8 | 27 September 1975 | Walsall | H | 4–1 | 5,456 | Hodgson, Clarke (3) |
| 9 | 4 October 1975 | Millwall | A | 0–1 | 6,792 | |
| 10 | 11 October 1975 | Peterborough United | H | 1–1 | 6,983 | Clarke |
| 11 | 17 October 1975 | Southend United | A | 2–2 | 3,483 | Clarke, Bird |
| 12 | 25 October 1975 | Preston North End | H | 0–1 | 6,687 | |
| 13 | 1 November 1975 | Wrexham | A | 0–1 | 2,750 | |
| 14 | 8 November 1975 | Halifax Town | H | 1–1 | 5,299 | Bird |
| 15 | 15 November 1975 | Grimsby Town | A | 1–4 | 4,872 | Bird |
| 16 | 29 November 1975 | Crystal Palace | A | 1–4 | 16,020 | Hodgson |
| 17 | 6 December 1975 | Swindon Town | H | 3–1 | 5,487 | Bird, Clarke, Randall |
| 18 | 20 December 1975 | Rotherham United | A | 1–2 | 6,067 | Hodgson |
| 19 | 26 December 1975 | Chesterfield | H | 0–1 | 8,607 | |
| 20 | 27 December 1975 | Sheffield Wednesday | A | 0–0 | 15,586 | |
| 21 | 3 January 1976 | Port Vale | H | 3–1 | 5,417 | Clarke (2), Randall |
| 22 | 10 January 1976 | Chester | A | 1–1 | 4,846 | Randall |
| 23 | 17 January 1976 | Gillingham | H | 1–1 | 5,939 | Shipperley (o.g.) |
| 24 | 20 January 1976 | Cardiff City | A | 0–1 | 9,739 | |
| 25 | 31 January 1976 | Brighton & Hove Albion | A | 0–1 | 11,921 | |
| 26 | 7 February 1976 | Hereford United | H | 2–2 | 5,997 | Bird, Clarke |
| 27 | 11 February 1976 | Hereford United | A | 0–1 | 8,302 | |
| 28 | 14 February 1976 | Halifax Town | A | 2–1 | 2,378 | Clarke, Saxby |
| 29 | 21 February 1976 | Grimsby Town | H | 1–0 | 6,085 | Clarke |
| 30 | 23 February 1976 | Bury | H | 1–1 | 6,650 | Clarke |
| 31 | 28 February 1976 | Preston North End | A | 2–0 | 6,945 | Clarke, Matthews |
| 32 | 1 March 1976 | Brighton & Hove Albion | H | 1–0 | 8,321 | McDonald |
| 33 | 6 March 1976 | Wrexham | H | 0–0 | 6,473 | |
| 34 | 8 March 1976 | Millwall | H | 1–1 | 7,447 | McCaffrey |
| 35 | 13 March 1976 | Peterborough United | A | 3–0 | 7,979 | Clarke (2), McCaffrey |
| 36 | 15 March 1976 | Southend United | H | 3–1 | 8,045 | Clarke (3) |
| 37 | 20 March 1976 | Crystal Palace | H | 1–1 | 12,990 | Laverick |
| 38 | 27 March 1976 | Swindon Town | A | 2–0 | 6,973 | Laverick, Clarke |
| 39 | 29 March 1976 | Rotherham United | H | 1–1 | 9,098 | Foster |
| 40 | 2 April 1976 | Shrewsbury Town | A | 2–1 | 4,580 | Clarke, Hodgson |
| 41 | 6 April 1976 | Walsall | A | 1–0 | 6,481 | Hodgson |
| 42 | 10 April 1976 | Aldershot | H | 1–0 | 7,200 | MacKenzie |
| 43 | 17 April 1976 | Chesterfield | A | 2–1 | 10,614 | Laverick, Eccles |
| 44 | 19 April 1976 | Sheffield Wednesday | H | 3–0 | 13,409 | Clarke, Hodgson, Pate |
| 45 | 20 April 1976 | Port Vale | A | 2–2 | 4,239 | Clarke (2) |
| 46 | 24 April 1976 | Colchester United | H | 0–0 | 7,407 | |

=== FA Cup ===
| Round | Date | Opponent | Venue | Result | Attendance | Scorers |
|---|---|---|---|---|---|---|
| R1 | 22 November 1975 | Wrexham | H | 1–1 | 6,279 | Eccles |
| R1 Replay | 24 November 1975 | Wrexham | A | 1–1 | 4,468 | Eccles |
| R1 2nd Replay | 8 December 1975 | Wrexham | N | 2–1 | 1,470 | Laverick, May (o.g.) |
| R2 | 13 December 1975 | Lincoln City | H | 1–2 | 8,466 | McDonald |

=== League Cup ===
| Round | Date | Opponent | Venue | Result | Attendance | Scorers |
|---|---|---|---|---|---|---|
| R1 1st leg | 20 August 1975 | Scunthorpe United | H | 4–0 | 4,810 | Laverick, McDonald (2), Bird |
| R1 2nd leg | 26 August 1975 | Scunthorpe United | A | 2–0 | 1,412 | Laverick, Lathan |
| R2 | 10 September 1975 | Wrexham | A | 2–1 | 3,644 | Bird, Clarke |
| R3 | 8 October 1975 | Coventry City | H | 2–0 | 10,027 | Eccles, Clarke |
| R4 | 12 November 1975 | Wolverhampton Wanderers | H | 1–0 | 12,725 | McDonald |
| R5 | 3 December 1975 | Manchester City | A | 2–4 | 30,022 | Bird, Clarke |

=== Anglo-Scottish Cup ===
| Round | Date | Opponent | Venue | Result | Attendance | Scorers |
|---|---|---|---|---|---|---|
| PR | 2 August 1975 | West Bromwich Albion | A | 1–1 | 5,704 | Bird |
| PR | 6 August 1975 | Leicester City | H | 2–0 | 6,496 | Matthews, Whitworth (o.g.) |
| PR | 9 August 1975 | Hull City | H | 2–1 | 5,757 | McDonald, Clarke |
| QF 1st leg | 15 September 1975 | Ayr United | A | 1–0 | 3,750 | McDonald |
| QF 2nd leg | 29 September 1975 | Ayr United | H | 2–0 | 7,149 | McDonald, Clarke |
| SF 1st leg | 21 October 1975 | Middlesbrough | A | 0–3 | 14,929 | |
| SF 2nd leg | 3 November 1975 | Middlesbrough | H | 0–2 | 7,115 | |

== Squad statistics ==
- Squad list sourced from 1975–76 Mansfield Town F.C. season at the English National Football Archive (subscription required)

| Pos. | Name | League | | FA Cup | | League Cup | | Anglo-Scottish Cup | | Total | |
| Pos. | Name | Apps | Goals | Apps | Goals | Apps | Goals | Apps | Goals | Apps | Goals |
|---|---|---|---|---|---|---|---|---|---|---|---|
| GK | (England) Rod Arnold | 39 | 0 | 0 | 0 | 4 | 0 | 6 | 0 | 49 | 0 |
| GK | (England) Roy Brown | 1 | 0 | 3 | 0 | 1 | 0 | 0 | 0 | 5 | 0 |
| GK | (England) Paul Evans | 6 | 0 | 1 | 0 | 1 | 0 | 1 | 0 | 9 | 0 |
| DF | (England) Kevin Bird | 26(2) | 6 | 4 | 0 | 6 | 3 | 6 | 1 | 42(2) | 10 |
| DF | (England) Barry Foster | 44 | 0 | 4 | 0 | 6 | 0 | 7 | 0 | 61 | 0 |
| DF | (England) Colin Foster | 34(2) | 1 | 0(1) | 0 | 3(1) | 0 | 3(2) | 0 | 40(3) | 1 |
| DF | (England) Ian MacKenzie | 36(1) | 1 | 4 | 0 | 5(1) | 0 | 4 | 0 | 49(2) | 1 |
| DF | (England) Lawrie Madden | 3 | 0 | 2 | 0 | 2 | 0 | 1 | 0 | 8 | 0 |
| DF | (Scotland) Sandy Pate | 40(1) | 1 | 4 | 0 | 4(1) | 0 | 7 | 0 | 55(2) | 1 |
| DF | (England) Mick Saxby | 1(1) | 1 | 0 | 0 | 0 | 0 | 0 | 0 | 1(1) | 1 |
| DF | (England) Steve Uzelac | 2 | 0 | 0 | 0 | 0 | 0 | 0 | 0 | 2 | 0 |
| DF | (England) Ian Wood | 2 | 0 | 0 | 0 | 0 | 0 | 0 | 0 | 2 | 0 |
| MF | (England) Gordon Hodgson | 46 | 7 | 4 | 0 | 6 | 0 | 7 | 0 | 63 | 7 |
| MF | (England) John Lathan | 10(2) | 0 | 0 | 0 | 2 | 1 | 1 | 0 | 13(2) | 1 |
| MF | (England) Micky Laverick | 22(3) | 3 | 1 | 1 | 3 | 2 | 2(2) | 0 | 28(5) | 6 |
| MF | (England) Paul Matthews | 28(1) | 1 | 4 | 0 | 3 | 0 | 6 | 1 | 41(1) | 2 |
| MF | (England) Jim McCaffrey | 35(1) | 2 | 2 | 0 | 4 | 0 | 4(2) | 0 | 45(3) | 2 |
| MF | (England) Ian McDonald | 32(2) | 4 | 4 | 1 | 7 | 3 | 7 | 3 | 48(2) | 11 |
| MF | (England) Noel O'Brien | 7 | 0 | 0 | 0 | 5 | 0 | 3 | 0 | 13 | 0 |
| FW | (England) Ray Clarke | 45 | 24 | 4 | 0 | 6 | 3 | 6 | 2 | 61 | 29 |
| FW | (England) Terry Eccles | 29(3) | 3 | 2 | 2 | 3(1) | 1 | 5 | 0 | 39(4) | 6 |
| FW | (England) Kevin Randall | 18 | 3 | 1 | 0 | 0 | 0 | 0 | 0 | 19 | 3 |
| – | Own goals | – | 1 | – | 1 | – | 0 | – | 1 | – | 3 |
