= 1973–74 Mansfield Town F.C. season =

Mansfield Town
1973–74 season
- Manager: Danny Williams; Dave Smith
- Stadium: Field Mill
- Fourth Division: 17th
- FA Cup: Second Round
- League Cup: First Round
- Watney Cup: First Round

The 1973–74 season was Mansfield Town's 37th season in the Football League and 5th in the Fourth Division, they finished in 17th position with 43 points.

== Final league table ==
Pos	Team	Pld	W	D	L	GF	GA	GAv	Pts
15	Rotherham United	46	15	13	18	56	58	0.966	43
16	Torquay United	46	13	17	16	52	57	0.912	43
17	Mansfield Town	46	13	17	16	62	69	0.899	43
18	Scunthorpe United	45	14	12	19	47	64	0.734	42 (Note: Scunthorpe United v. Exeter was never played; Exeter failed to turn up and Scunthorpe were awarded the points.)
19	Brentford	46	12	16	18	48	50	0.960	40

Source: rsssf.com

== Results ==
=== Football League Fourth Division ===
Match	Date	Opponent	Venue	Result	Attendance	Scorers
1	25 August 1973	Peterborough United	A	1–2	7,045	Eccles
2	1 September 1973	Northampton Town	H	2–0	3,109	Eccles, Roberts
3	8 September 1973	Barnsley	A	1–1	2,487	Thompson
4	10 September 1973	Stockport County	A	1–1	3,665	Eccles
5	15 September 1973	Swansea City	H	2–1	3,250	Roberts, Bird
6	17 September 1973	Chester	H	3–0	3,938	Eccles (3)
7	22 September 1973	Crewe Alexandra	A	1–1	1,797	Roberts
8	29 September 1973	Darlington	H	1–0	3,254	Jones
9	3 October 1973	Chester	A	1–1	2,693	Laverick
10	9 October 1973	Newport County	A	0–2	3,107	
11	13 October 1973	Hartlepool	H	2–0	3,107	Laverick, Roberts
12	20 October 1973	Reading	A	0–3	6,357	
13	22 October 1973	Stockport County	H	5–0	3,443	Longhorn, Eccles (3), Roberts
14	27 October 1973	Torquay United	H	2–1	3,924	Bird, Eccles
15	3 November 1973	Brentford	A	1–4	4,331	McCaffrey
16	10 November 1973	Colchester United	H	2–2	3,306	Longhorn, Eccles
17	14 November 1973	Bradford City	A	1–3	3,276	Bird
18	17 November 1973	Gillingham	H	2–2	2,908	McCaffrey, Roberts
19	1 December 1973	Rotherham United	H	3–0	2,787	Eccles, Christopher, Swift (o.g.)
20	8 December 1973	Scunthorpe United	A	3–5	2,575	Eccles, McCaffrey, Walker
21	22 December 1973	Darlington	A	0–1	1,603	
22	26 December 1973	Lincoln City	H	4–3	4,529	Peplow, Eccles (2), Cooper (o.g.)
23	29 December 1973	Barnsley	H	2–2	4,141	Peplow, Walker
24	1 January 1974	Northampton Town	A	0–2	6,231	
25	12 January 1974	Swansea City	A	0–2	4,196	
26	20 January 1974	Peterborough United	H	2–1	4,196	Peplow, Eccles
27	27 January 1974	Bury	A	0–2	6,222	
28	10 February 1974	Crewe Alexandra	H	1–2	2,690	Eccles
29	17 February 1974	Hartlepool	A	0–4	4,067	
30	24 February 1974	Newport County	H	2–1	3,006	Roberts, Lathan
31	3 March 1974	Lincoln City	A	1–1	2,615	Eccles
32	9 March 1974	Exeter City	A	1–1	3,669	Lathan
33	10 March 1974	Torquay United	A	0–4	2,843	
34	16 March 1974	Reading	H	1–1	2,183	Eccles
35	18 March 1974	Exeter City	H	3–3	2,401	Laverick (2), Bird
36	22 March 1974	Colchester United	A	0–1	4,695	
37	26 March 1974	Doncaster Rovers	A	0–0	1,894	
38	30 March 1974	Brentford	H	1–1	1,909	Lathan
39	1 April 1974	Bury	H	1–2	2,627	Lathan
40	6 April 1974	Bradford City	H	0–0	2,114	
41	13 April 1974	Gillingham	A	2–2	7,972	Lathan, Bird
42	15 April 1974	Workington	A	0–0	1,094	
43	17 April 1974	Workington	H	2–0	2,329	Eccles, Bird
44	20 April 1974	Scunthorpe United	H	2–2	2,342	Foster, Bird
45	27 April 1974	Rotherham United	A	1–2	2,632	Laverick
46	29 April 1974	Doncaster Rovers	H	2–0	2,474	Edwards, Bird

=== FA Cup ===
Round	Date	Opponent	Venue	Result	Attendance	Scorers
R1	24 November 1973	York City	A	0–0	4,254	
R1 Replay	10 December 1973	York City	H	5–3	4,773	Eccles, McCaffrey, Thompson, Foster, Walker
R2	15 December 1973	Scunthorpe United	H	1–1	4,511	Eccles
R2 Replay	18 December 1973	Scunthorpe United	A	0–1	2,679	

=== League Cup ===
Round	Date	Opponent	Venue	Result	Attendance	Scorers
R1	29 August 1973	Chesterfield	H	1–1	7,321	Laverick
R1 Replay	3 September 1973	Chesterfield	A	0–1	5,771	

=== Watney Cup ===
Round	Date	Opponent	Venue	Result	Attendance	Scorers
R1	11 August 1973	Hull City	H	0–3	6,137	

== Squad statistics ==
- Squad list sourced from 1973–74 Mansfield Town F.C. season at the English National Football Archive (subscription required)

Pos.	Name	League		FA Cup		League Cup		Watney Cup		Total	
Pos.	Name	Apps	Goals	Apps	Goals	Apps	Goals	Apps	Goals	Apps	Goals
GK	(England) Rod Arnold	29	0	1	0	0	0	1	0	31	0
GK	(England) Graham Brown	17	0	3	0	2	0	0	0	22	0
DF	(England) Kevin Bird	44	8	3	0	2	0	1	0	50	8
DF	(England) Frank Burrows	6	0	0	0	0	0	0	0	6	0
DF	(England) Dick Edwards	31(2)	1	0	0	1	0	1	0	33(2)	1
DF	(England) Barry Foster	19(3)	0	4	0	0(1)	0	0	0	23(4)	0
DF	(England) Colin Foster	24(3)	1	4	1	1	0	0	0	29(4)	2
DF	(Scotland) Bill Grozier	1	0	0	0	0	0	0	0	1	0
DF	(England) Dave Lyon	2	0	0	0	0	0	0	0	2	0
DF	(England) Tony Parry	0(1)	0	0	0	0	0	0	0	0(1)	0
DF	(Scotland) Sandy Pate	46	0	4	0	2	0	1	0	53	0
DF	(Northern Ireland) Sammy Todd	6	0	0	0	0	0	0	0	6	0
DF	(England) Clive Walker	42	2	4	1	2	0	1	0	49	3
MF	(England) Paul Jones	15(5)	1	0	0	1	0	1	0	17(5)	1
MF	(England) John Lathan	17	5	0	0	0	0	0	0	17	5
MF	(England) Micky Laverick	30(6)	5	1(1)	0	2	1	0	0	33(7)	6
MF	(England) Dennis Longhorn	28(1)	2	4	0	2	0	1	0	35(1)	2
MF	(England) Paul Matthews	12(1)	0	0	0	0	0	1	0	13(1)	0
MF	(England) Jim McCaffrey	37(3)	3	4	1	1	0	0(1)	0	42(4)	4
FW	(England) Paul Christopher	7(1)	1	2	0	0	0	0	0	9(1)	1
FW	(England) Trevor Cook	1	0	0	0	0	0	0	0	1	0
FW	(England) Terry Eccles	44	20	4	2	2	0	1	0	51	22
FW	(England) Steve Peplow	4	3	0	0	0	0	0	0	4	3
FW	(England) Dudley Roberts	27(1)	7	3	0	2	0	1	0	33(21)	7
FW	(England) Dave Thompson	17	1	3	1	2	0	1	0	23	2
–	Own goals	–	2	–	0	–	0	–	0	–	2
