= 2026–27 in English football =

Football in England
- Season: 2026–27

Men's football
- Community Shield: Arsenal

The 2026–27 season is the 147th competitive association football season in England.

== National teams ==
=== England men's national football team ===
==== 2026–27 UEFA Nations League ====
===== Group 3 =====
| Pos | Team | Pld | W | D | L | GF | GA | GD | Pts | Qualification or relegation | (England) | (Spain) | (Croatia) | (Czech Republic) |
|---|---|---|---|---|---|---|---|---|---|---|---|---|---|---|
| 1 | England | 6 | 5 | 0 | 1 | 19 | 6 | +13 | 15 (Note: Tied on head-to-head results. Overall goal difference: England +13, Spain +8.) | Advance to quarter-finals | — | 2–3 | 2–1 | 3–0 |
| 2 | Spain | 6 | 5 | 0 | 1 | 16 | 8 | +8 | 15 | Advance to quarter-finals | 2–3 | — | 4–1 | 3–1 |
| 3 | Croatia | 6 | 2 | 0 | 4 | 7 | 17 | −10 | 6 | Qualification for relegation play-offs | 0–7 | 1–2 | — | 2–1 |
| 4 | Czech Republic (R) | 6 | 0 | 0 | 6 | 3 | 14 | −11 | 0 | Relegated to League B | 0–2 | 0–2 | 1–2 | — |

Source: UEFA
Rules for classification: Tiebreakers
(R) Relegated
Notes:

| 26 September 2026 | England | 2–3 | Spain | London, England |
| 19:45 UTC+1 | Gordon 36'; Kane 40' | Report | Yamal 2'; Baena 60'; Oyarzabal 74' | Stadium: Wembley Stadium; Referee: Davide Massa (Italy) |

| 29 September 2026 | Czech Republic | 0–2 | England | Prague, Czech Republic |
| 20:45 UTC+2 | | Report | Gordon 47'; Kane 69' | Stadium: Fortuna Arena; Referee: Halil Umut Meler (Turkey) |

| 3 October 2026 | Croatia | 0–7 | England | Zagreb, Croatia |
| 20:45 UTC+2 | | Report | Kane 8', 53'; Bellingham 21'; Gordon 39'; Saka 45', 68'; Rogers 87' | Stadium: Stadion Maksimir; Attendance: 6,342; Referee: Sven Jablonski (Germany) |

| 6 October 2026 | England | 3–0 | Czech Republic | London, England |
| 19:45 UTC+1 | Coufal 27' (o.g.); Kane 40', 57' | Report | | Stadium: Wembley Stadium; Referee: Serdar Gözübüyük (Netherlands) |

| 12 November 2026 | England | 2–1 | Croatia | London, England |
| 19:45 UTC+0 | Rogers 24'; Kane 64' (pen.) | Report | P. Sučić 59' | Stadium: Wembley Stadium; Attendance: 80,484; Referee: Morten Krogh (Denmark) |

| 15 November 2026 | Spain | 2–3 | England | Madrid, Spain |
| 20:45 UTC+1 | Oyarzabal 65' (pen.); Williams 75' | Report | Kane 45' (pen.); Konsa 53'; White 57' | Stadium: Estadio Metropolitano; Attendance: 63,788; Referee: Clément Turpin (France) |

===== Quarter-finals =====
| Team 1 | Agg. | Team 2 | 1st leg | 2nd leg |
|---|---|---|---|---|
| Norway | | England | 27 Mar | 30 Mar |

| 27 March 2027 Quarter-finals | Norway | v | England | Oslo, Norway |
| 18:00 CET (UTC+01:00) | | Report | | Stadium: Ullevaal Stadion |

| 30 March 2027 Quarter-finals | England | v | Norway | London, England |
| 19:45 GMT (UTC+00:00) | | Report | | Stadium: Wembley Stadium |

=== England women's national football team ===
==== Results and fixtures ====
===== 2027 FIFA Women's World Cup qualification – UEFA play-offs =====
====== Round 1 ======
| Team 1 | Agg. | Team 2 | 1st leg | 2nd leg |
|---|---|---|---|---|
| Greece | 1–8 | England | 1–3 | 0–5 |

| 7 October 2026 | Greece | 1–3 | England | Heraklion, Greece |
| 19:30 UTC+3 | Brookshire 78' | Report | Stanway 39'; Le Tissier 63'; Russo 67' | Stadium: Pankritio Stadium; Attendance: 3,942; Referee: Martina Molinaro (Italy) |

| 13 October 2026 | England | 5–0 | Greece | Leicester, England |
| 19:30 UTC+1 | Russo 3', 75'; James 16', 34'; Stanway 30' | Report | | Stadium: King Power Stadium; Attendance: 18,587; Referee: Rasa Grigonė (Lithuania) |

====== Round 2 ======
| Team 1 | Agg. | Team 2 | 1st leg | 2nd leg |
|---|---|---|---|---|
| Ukraine | | England | 1 Dec | 5 Dec |

=== U–20 ===
==== FIFA U-20 Women's World Cup ====
===== Group B =====
| Pos | Team | Pld | W | D | L | GF | GA | GD | Pts | Qualification |
|---|---|---|---|---|---|---|---|---|---|---|
| 1 | Brazil | 3 | 3 | 0 | 0 | 9 | 2 | +7 | 9 | Knockout stage |
| 2 | England | 3 | 1 | 1 | 1 | 7 | 4 | +3 | 4 (Note: Team conduct score: England −2, Canada −5.) | Knockout stage |
| 3 | Canada | 3 | 1 | 1 | 1 | 7 | 4 | +3 | 4 | Knockout stage |
| 4 | Tanzania | 3 | 0 | 0 | 3 | 2 | 15 | −13 | 0 | |

Source: FIFA
Rules for classification: Group stage tiebreakers

===== Knockout stage =====
| 17 September 2026 R16 | England | 0–3 | Nigeria | Bielsko-Biała, Poland |
| 15:00 | | Report | Rafiu 8'; Akekoromowei 47'; Mamadu 73' | Stadium: Stadion Miejski Bielsko-Biała; Attendance: 615; Referee: Myriam Marcotte (Canada) |

== UEFA competitions ==
=== UEFA Super Cup ===
12 August 2026
21:00 UTC+2

| Paris Saint-Germain (France) | 2–1 | (England) Aston Villa |
|---|---|---|
| Kvaratskhelia 20'; Doué 61' | Report | Madjo 45' |

Red Bull Arena, Salzburg
Attendance: 27,681
Referee: Omar Artan (Somalia)

=== UEFA Champions League ===
==== League phase ====
===== Arsenal =====
| Pos | Team | Pld | W | D | L | GF | GA | GD | Pts | Qualification |
|---|---|---|---|---|---|---|---|---|---|---|
| 1 | (France) Paris Saint-Germain | 4 | 4 | 0 | 0 | 20 | 5 | +15 | 12 | Advance to round of 16 (seeded) |
| 2 | (Spain) Real Madrid | 4 | 4 | 0 | 0 | 13 | 7 | +6 | 12 | Advance to round of 16 (seeded) |
| 3 | (England) Arsenal | 4 | 3 | 1 | 0 | 8 | 3 | +5 | 10 | Advance to round of 16 (seeded) |
| 4 | (Italy) Como | 4 | 3 | 0 | 1 | 19 | 6 | +13 | 9 | Advance to round of 16 (seeded) |
| 5 | (Spain) Barcelona | 4 | 3 | 0 | 1 | 14 | 6 | +8 | 9 | Advance to round of 16 (seeded) |

Updated to match(es) played on 4 November 2026. Source: UEFA
Rules for classification: League phase tiebreakers

| Home team | Score | Away team |
|---|---|---|
| Napoli (Italy) | 0–1 | (England) Arsenal |
| Arsenal (England) | 3–0 | (France) Lille |
| Bayern Munich (Germany) | 2–2 | (England) Arsenal |
| Slavia Prague (Czech Republic) | 1–2 | (England) Arsenal |
| Arsenal (England) | 24 Nov | (Germany) Borussia Dortmund |
| Arsenal (England) | 9 Dec | (Spain) Real Madrid |
| Real Betis (Spain) | 20 Jan | (England) Arsenal |
| Arsenal (England) | 27 Jan | (Azerbaijan) Sabah |

===== Aston Villa =====
| Pos | Team | Pld | W | D | L | GF | GA | GD | Pts | Qualification |
|---|---|---|---|---|---|---|---|---|---|---|
| 4 | (Italy) Como | 4 | 3 | 0 | 1 | 19 | 6 | +13 | 9 | Advance to round of 16 (seeded) |
| 5 | (Spain) Barcelona | 4 | 3 | 0 | 1 | 14 | 6 | +8 | 9 | Advance to round of 16 (seeded) |
| 6 | (England) Aston Villa | 4 | 3 | 0 | 1 | 12 | 6 | +6 | 9 | Advance to round of 16 (seeded) |
| 7 | (England) Manchester City | 4 | 3 | 0 | 1 | 12 | 7 | +5 | 9 | Advance to round of 16 (seeded) |
| 8 | (England) Liverpool | 4 | 3 | 0 | 1 | 14 | 10 | +4 | 9 | Advance to round of 16 (seeded) |

Updated to match(es) played on 4 November 2026. Source: UEFA
Rules for classification: League phase tiebreakers

| Home team | Score | Away team |
|---|---|---|
| Club Brugge (Belgium) | 2–3 | (England) Aston Villa |
| Aston Villa (England) | 6–0 | (Turkey) Fenerbahçe |
| Aston Villa (England) | 3–1 | (Norway) Viking |
| Barcelona (Spain) | 3–0 | (England) Aston Villa |
| Galatasaray (Turkey) | 24 Nov | (England) Aston Villa |
| Aston Villa (England) | 8 Dec | (France) Paris Saint-Germain |
| Aston Villa (England) | 19 Jan | (Germany) Borussia Dortmund |
| Slavia Prague (Czech Republic) | 27 Jan | (England) Aston Villa |

===== Liverpool =====
| Pos | Team | Pld | W | D | L | GF | GA | GD | Pts | Qualification |
|---|---|---|---|---|---|---|---|---|---|---|
| 6 | (England) Aston Villa | 4 | 3 | 0 | 1 | 12 | 6 | +6 | 9 | Advance to round of 16 (seeded) |
| 7 | (England) Manchester City | 4 | 3 | 0 | 1 | 12 | 7 | +5 | 9 | Advance to round of 16 (seeded) |
| 8 | (England) Liverpool | 4 | 3 | 0 | 1 | 14 | 10 | +4 | 9 | Advance to round of 16 (seeded) |
| 9 | (Belgium) Club Brugge | 4 | 3 | 0 | 1 | 11 | 7 | +4 | 9 | Advance to knockout phase play-offs (seeded) |
| 10 | (Portugal) Sporting CP | 4 | 3 | 0 | 1 | 8 | 4 | +4 | 9 | Advance to knockout phase play-offs (seeded) |

Updated to match(es) played on 4 November 2026. Source: UEFA
Rules for classification: League phase tiebreakers

| Home team | Score | Away team |
|---|---|---|
| Liverpool (England) | 2–1 | (Spain) Atlético Madrid |
| LASK (Austria) | 3–6 | (England) Liverpool |
| Liverpool (England) | 4–3 | (Spain) Villarreal |
| Fenerbahçe (Turkey) | 3–2 | (England) Liverpool |
| Club Brugge (Belgium) | 25 Nov | (England) Liverpool |
| Liverpool (England) | 9 Dec | (Portugal) Porto |
| Inter Milan (Italy) | 19 Jan | (England) Liverpool |
| Liverpool (England) | 27 Jan | (France) Lens |

===== Manchester City =====
| Pos | Team | Pld | W | D | L | GF | GA | GD | Pts | Qualification |
|---|---|---|---|---|---|---|---|---|---|---|
| 5 | (Spain) Barcelona | 4 | 3 | 0 | 1 | 14 | 6 | +8 | 9 | Advance to round of 16 (seeded) |
| 6 | (England) Aston Villa | 4 | 3 | 0 | 1 | 12 | 6 | +6 | 9 | Advance to round of 16 (seeded) |
| 7 | (England) Manchester City | 4 | 3 | 0 | 1 | 12 | 7 | +5 | 9 | Advance to round of 16 (seeded) |
| 8 | (England) Liverpool | 4 | 3 | 0 | 1 | 14 | 10 | +4 | 9 | Advance to round of 16 (seeded) |
| 9 | (Belgium) Club Brugge | 4 | 3 | 0 | 1 | 11 | 7 | +4 | 9 | Advance to knockout phase play-offs (seeded) |

Updated to match(es) played on 4 November 2026. Source: UEFA
Rules for classification: League phase tiebreakers

| Home team | Score | Away team |
|---|---|---|
| Porto (Portugal) | 0–2 | (England) Manchester City |
| Manchester City (England) | 2–4 | (France) Paris Saint-Germain |
| Manchester City (England) | 5–1 | (Greece) AEK Athens |
| RB Leipzig (Germany) | 2–3 | (England) Manchester City |
| Manchester City (England) | 24 Nov | (Italy) Napoli |
| Barcelona (Spain) | 8 Dec | (England) Manchester City |
| Lens (France) | 20 Jan | (England) Manchester City |
| Manchester City (England) | 27 Jan | (Portugal) Sporting CP |

===== Manchester United =====
| Pos | Team | Pld | W | D | L | GF | GA | GD | Pts | Qualification |
|---|---|---|---|---|---|---|---|---|---|---|
| 15 | (Italy) Inter Milan | 4 | 2 | 0 | 2 | 8 | 6 | +2 | 6 | Advance to knockout phase play-offs (seeded) |
| 16 | (Austria) LASK | 4 | 2 | 0 | 2 | 10 | 9 | +1 | 6 | Advance to knockout phase play-offs (seeded) |
| 17 | (England) Manchester United | 4 | 2 | 0 | 2 | 8 | 8 | 0 | 6 | Advance to knockout phase play-offs (unseeded) |
| 18 | (Turkey) Galatasaray | 4 | 2 | 0 | 2 | 8 | 9 | −1 | 6 | Advance to knockout phase play-offs (unseeded) |
| 19 | (Turkey) Fenerbahçe | 4 | 1 | 2 | 1 | 6 | 11 | −5 | 5 | Advance to knockout phase play-offs (unseeded) |

Updated to match(es) played on 4 November 2026. Source: UEFA
Rules for classification: League phase tiebreakers

| Home team | Score | Away team |
|---|---|---|
| Manchester United (England) | 4–0 | (Azerbaijan) Sabah |
| Atlético Madrid (Spain) | 2–0 | (England) Manchester United |
| Como (Italy) | 4–1 | (England) Manchester United |
| Manchester United (England) | 3–2 | (Italy) Roma |
| Sporting CP (Portugal) | 25 Nov | (England) Manchester United |
| Manchester United (England) | 8 Dec | (Germany) RB Leipzig |
| Manchester United (England) | 20 Jan | (Germany) Bayern Munich |
| Villarreal (Spain) | 27 Jan | (England) Manchester United |

=== UEFA Europa League ===
==== League phase ====
===== Bournemouth =====
| Pos | Team | Pld | W | D | L | GF | GA | GD | Pts | Qualification |
|---|---|---|---|---|---|---|---|---|---|---|
| 1 | (Portugal) Benfica | 4 | 4 | 0 | 0 | 13 | 3 | +10 | 12 | Advance to round of 16 (seeded) |
| 2 | (England) Bournemouth | 4 | 4 | 0 | 0 | 11 | 2 | +9 | 12 | Advance to round of 16 (seeded) |
| 3 | (Hungary) Ferencváros | 4 | 4 | 0 | 0 | 11 | 3 | +8 | 12 | Advance to round of 16 (seeded) |
| 4 | (Belgium) Union Saint-Gilloise | 4 | 3 | 1 | 0 | 10 | 2 | +8 | 10 | Advance to round of 16 (seeded) |
| 5 | (Italy) Juventus | 4 | 3 | 1 | 0 | 11 | 4 | +7 | 10 | Advance to round of 16 (seeded) |

Updated to match(es) played on 5 November 2026. Source: UEFA
Rules for classification: League phase tiebreakers

| Home team | Score | Away team |
|---|---|---|
| Real Sociedad (Spain) | 1–2 | (England) Bournemouth |
| Bournemouth (England) | 3–0 | (Austria) Sturm Graz |
| Bournemouth (England) | 3–0 | (Italy) Milan |
| Sparta Prague (Czech Republic) | 1–3 | (England) Bournemouth |
| Celta Vigo (Spain) | 26 Nov | (England) Bournemouth |
| Bournemouth (England) | 10 Dec | (Czech Republic) Viktoria Plzeň |
| Lillestrøm (Norway) | 21 Jan | (England) Bournemouth |
| Bournemouth (England) | 28 Jan | (Israel) Hapoel Be'er Sheva |

===== Crystal Palace =====
| Pos | Team | Pld | W | D | L | GF | GA | GD | Pts | Qualification |
|---|---|---|---|---|---|---|---|---|---|---|
| 19 | (Portugal) Torreense | 4 | 2 | 0 | 2 | 7 | 9 | −2 | 6 | Advance to knockout phase play-offs (unseeded) |
| 20 | (Spain) Real Sociedad | 4 | 1 | 2 | 1 | 9 | 4 | +5 | 5 | Advance to knockout phase play-offs (unseeded) |
| 21 | (England) Crystal Palace | 4 | 1 | 2 | 1 | 9 | 6 | +3 | 5 | Advance to knockout phase play-offs (unseeded) |
| 22 | (Czech Republic) Sparta Prague | 4 | 1 | 1 | 2 | 6 | 6 | 0 | 4 | Advance to knockout phase play-offs (unseeded) |
| 23 | (Germany) TSG Hoffenheim | 4 | 1 | 1 | 2 | 6 | 6 | 0 | 4 | Advance to knockout phase play-offs (unseeded) |

Updated to match(es) played on 5 November 2026. Source: UEFA
Rules for classification: League phase tiebreakers

| Home team | Score | Away team |
|---|---|---|
| Crystal Palace (England) | 4–0 | (Poland) Lech Poznań |
| Lyon (France) | 3–2 | (England) Crystal Palace |
| Beşiktaş (Turkey) | 2–2 | (England) Crystal Palace |
| Crystal Palace (England) | 1–1 | (Germany) TSG Hoffenheim |
| Crystal Palace (England) | 26 Nov | (Spain) Real Sociedad |
| Jagiellonia Białystok (Poland) | 10 Dec | (England) Crystal Palace |
| Crystal Palace (England) | 21 Jan | (Czech Republic) Sparta Prague |
| Red Bull Salzburg (Austria) | 28 Jan | (England) Crystal Palace |

===== Sunderland =====
| Pos | Team | Pld | W | D | L | GF | GA | GD | Pts | Qualification |
|---|---|---|---|---|---|---|---|---|---|---|
| 9 | (Croatia) Dinamo Zagreb | 4 | 2 | 1 | 1 | 5 | 4 | +1 | 7 | Advance to knockout phase play-offs (seeded) |
| 10 | (Bulgaria) Levski Sofia | 4 | 2 | 1 | 1 | 4 | 3 | +1 | 7 | Advance to knockout phase play-offs (seeded) |
| 11 | (England) Sunderland | 4 | 2 | 1 | 1 | 4 | 4 | 0 | 7 | Advance to knockout phase play-offs (seeded) |
| 12 | (Netherlands) NEC | 4 | 2 | 1 | 1 | 8 | 9 | −1 | 7 | Advance to knockout phase play-offs (seeded) |
| 13 | (France) Lyon | 4 | 2 | 1 | 1 | 6 | 7 | −1 | 7 | Advance to knockout phase play-offs (seeded) |

Updated to match(es) played on 5 November 2026. Source: UEFA
Rules for classification: League phase tiebreakers

| Home team | Score | Away team |
|---|---|---|
| Sunderland (England) | 1–0 | (Netherlands) AZ |
| Torreense (Portugal) | 1–2 | (England) Sunderland |
| Lech Poznań (Poland) | 1–1 | (England) Sunderland |
| Sunderland (England) | 0–2 | (Croatia) Dinamo Zagreb |
| Sunderland (England) | 26 Nov | (Poland) Jagiellonia Białystok |
| Milan (Italy) | 10 Dec | (England) Sunderland |
| Anderlecht (Belgium) | 21 Jan | (England) Sunderland |
| Sunderland (England) | 28 Jan | (Bulgaria) Levski Sofia |

=== UEFA Conference League ===
==== Qualifying round ====
===== Play-off round =====
Play-off round
| Team 1 | Agg. | Team 2 | 1st leg | 2nd leg |
|---|---|---|---|---|
| Tromsø (Norway) | 0–4 | (England) Brighton & Hove Albion | 0–0 | 0–4 |

==== League phase ====
===== Brighton & Hove Albion =====
| Pos | Team | Pld | W | D | L | GF | GA | GD | Pts | Qualification |
|---|---|---|---|---|---|---|---|---|---|---|
| 3 | (Netherlands) Twente | 3 | 3 | 0 | 0 | 8 | 2 | +6 | 9 | Advance to round of 16 (seeded) |
| 4 | (France) Monaco | 3 | 3 | 0 | 0 | 7 | 1 | +6 | 9 | Advance to round of 16 (seeded) |
| 5 | (England) Brighton & Hove Albion | 3 | 2 | 1 | 0 | 5 | 0 | +5 | 7 | Advance to round of 16 (seeded) |
| 6 | (Norway) Brann | 3 | 2 | 1 | 0 | 7 | 3 | +4 | 7 | Advance to round of 16 (seeded) |
| 7 | (Denmark) Copenhagen | 3 | 2 | 1 | 0 | 7 | 3 | +4 | 7 | Advance to round of 16 (seeded) |

Updated to match(es) played on 5 November 2026. Source: UEFA
Rules for classification: League phase tiebreakers

| Home team | Score | Away team |
|---|---|---|
| Brighton & Hove Albion (England) | 4–0 | (Lithuania) Kauno Žalgiris |
| Jablonec (Czech Republic) | 0–0 | (England) Brighton & Hove Albion |
| Getafe (Spain) | 0–1 | (England) Brighton & Hove Albion |
| Brighton & Hove Albion (England) | 26 Nov | (Romania) Universitatea Craiova |
| Brighton & Hove Albion (England) | 10 Dec | (France) Monaco |
| Panathinaikos (Greece) | 17 Dec | (England) Brighton & Hove Albion |

=== UEFA Women's Champions League ===
==== Qualifying rounds ====
===== Third qualifying round =====
Third qualifying round
| Team 1 | Agg. | Team 2 | 1st leg | 2nd leg |
|---|---|---|---|---|
| Chelsea (England) | 6–2 | (Spain) Real Sociedad | 5–2 | 1–0 |

==== League stage ====
===== Arsenal =====
| Pos | Team | Pld | W | D | L | GF | GA | GD | Pts | Qualification |
|---|---|---|---|---|---|---|---|---|---|---|
| 6 | (Royal Spanish Football Federation) Real Madrid (T) | 5 | 2 | 3 | 0 | 10 | 5 | +5 | 9 (Note: Ranked based on away goals scored, Manchester City 8, Real Madrid 3) | Advance to the knockout phase play-offs (seeded) |
| 7 | (Italian Football Federation) Juventus (T) | 5 | 3 | 0 | 2 | 10 | 9 | +1 | 9 | Advance to the knockout phase play-offs (seeded) |
| 8 | (The Football Association) Arsenal (T) | 5 | 2 | 2 | 1 | 7 | 5 | +2 | 8 | Advance to the knockout phase play-offs (seeded) |
| 9 | (Italian Football Federation) Roma | 5 | 2 | 1 | 2 | 5 | 11 | −6 | 7 | Advance to the knockout phase play-offs (unseeded) |
| 10 | (Portuguese Football Federation) Benfica | 5 | 2 | 0 | 3 | 7 | 11 | −4 | 6 | Advance to the knockout phase play-offs (unseeded) |

Updated to match(es) played on 19 November 2026. Source: UEFA
Rules for classification: League phase tiebreakers
(T) Qualified, but not yet for the particular phase indicated
Notes:

| Home team | Score | Away team |
|---|---|---|
| Arsenal (England) | 1–0 | (Denmark) HB Køge |
| Paris FC (France) | 2–2 | (England) Arsenal |
| Arsenal (England) | 3–0 | (Portugal) Benfica |
| Barcelona (Spain) | 12 Nov | (England) Arsenal |
| Arsenal (England) | 19 Nov | (France) OL Lyonnes |
| Inter Milan (Italy) | 16 Dec | (England) Arsenal |

===== Chelsea =====
| Pos | Team | Pld | W | D | L | GF | GA | GD | Pts | Qualification |
|---|---|---|---|---|---|---|---|---|---|---|
| 2 | (French Football Federation) OL Lyonnes (Q) | 5 | 4 | 1 | 0 | 22 | 0 | +22 | 13 | Advance to the quarter-finals (seeded) |
| 3 | (German Football Association) Bayern Munich (T) | 5 | 3 | 2 | 0 | 13 | 5 | +8 | 11 | Advance to the quarter-finals (seeded) |
| 4 | (The Football Association) Chelsea (T) | 5 | 3 | 2 | 0 | 4 | 0 | +4 | 11 | Advance to the quarter-finals (seeded) |
| 5 | (The Football Association) Manchester City (T) | 5 | 2 | 3 | 0 | 10 | 5 | +5 | 9 (Note: Ranked based on away goals scored, Manchester City 8, Real Madrid 3) | Advance to the knockout phase play-offs (seeded) |
| 6 | (Royal Spanish Football Federation) Real Madrid (T) | 5 | 2 | 3 | 0 | 10 | 5 | +5 | 9 | Advance to the knockout phase play-offs (seeded) |

Updated to match(es) played on 19 November 2026. Source: UEFA
Rules for classification: League phase tiebreakers
(Q) Qualified for the phase indicated; (T) Qualified, but not yet for the particular phase indicated
Notes:

| Home team | Score | Away team |
|---|---|---|
| Chelsea (England) | 1–0 | Austria Wien |
| OL Lyonnes (France) | 0–0 | (England) Chelsea |
| Chelsea (England) | 2–0 | (Italy) Roma |
| BK Häcken (Sweden) | 0–0 | (England) Chelsea |
| Chelsea (England) | 18 Nov | (France) Paris Saint-Germain |
| OH Leuven (Belgium) | 16 Dec | (England) Chelsea |

===== Manchester City =====
| Pos | Team | Pld | W | D | L | GF | GA | GD | Pts | Qualification |
|---|---|---|---|---|---|---|---|---|---|---|
| 3 | (German Football Association) Bayern Munich (T) | 5 | 3 | 2 | 0 | 13 | 5 | +8 | 11 | Advance to the quarter-finals (seeded) |
| 4 | (The Football Association) Chelsea (T) | 5 | 3 | 2 | 0 | 4 | 0 | +4 | 11 | Advance to the quarter-finals (seeded) |
| 5 | (The Football Association) Manchester City (T) | 5 | 2 | 3 | 0 | 10 | 5 | +5 | 9 (Note: Ranked based on away goals scored, Manchester City 8, Real Madrid 3) | Advance to the knockout phase play-offs (seeded) |
| 6 | (Royal Spanish Football Federation) Real Madrid (T) | 5 | 2 | 3 | 0 | 10 | 5 | +5 | 9 | Advance to the knockout phase play-offs (seeded) |
| 7 | (Italian Football Federation) Juventus (T) | 5 | 3 | 0 | 2 | 10 | 9 | +1 | 9 | Advance to the knockout phase play-offs (seeded) |

Updated to match(es) played on 19 November 2026. Source: UEFA
Rules for classification: League phase tiebreakers
(T) Qualified, but not yet for the particular phase indicated
Notes:

| Home team | Score | Away team |
|---|---|---|
| Bayern Munich (Germany) | 2–2 | (England) Manchester City |
| Manchester City (England) | 1–1 | (Spain) Real Madrid |
| Manchester City (England) | 1–1 | (France) Paris Saint-Germain |
| Inter Milan (Italy) | 1–4 | (England) Manchester City |
| BK Häcken (Sweden) | 18 Nov | (England) Manchester City |
| Manchester City (England) | 16 Dec | Austria Wien |

=== UEFA Youth League ===
==== UEFA Champions League Path ====
===== Arsenal =====
| Pos | Team | Pld | W | D | L | GF | GA | GD | Pts | Qualification |
|---|---|---|---|---|---|---|---|---|---|---|
| 21 | (England) Manchester United | 4 | 1 | 1 | 2 | 7 | 6 | +1 | 4 | Advance to knockout phase |
| 22 | (Germany) Bayern Munich | 4 | 1 | 1 | 2 | 10 | 10 | 0 | 4 | Advance to knockout phase |
| 23 | (England) Arsenal | 4 | 1 | 1 | 2 | 7 | 8 | −1 | 4 | |
| 24 | (Italy) Como | 4 | 1 | 1 | 2 | 4 | 5 | −1 | 4 | |
| 25 | (England) Aston Villa | 4 | 1 | 1 | 2 | 8 | 10 | −2 | 4 | |

Updated to match(es) played on 4 November 2026. Source: UEFA
Rules for classification: League phase tiebreakers

| Home team | Score | Away team |
|---|---|---|
| Napoli (Italy) | 1–2 | (England) Arsenal |
| Arsenal (England) | 2–3 | (France) Lille |
| Bayern Munich (Germany) | 3–3 | (England) Arsenal |
| Slavia Prague (Czech Republic) | 1–0 | (England) Arsenal |
| Arsenal (England) | 24 Nov | (Germany) Borussia Dortmund |
| Arsenal (England) | 9 Dec | (Spain) Real Madrid |

===== Aston Villa =====
| Pos | Team | Pld | W | D | L | GF | GA | GD | Pts |
|---|---|---|---|---|---|---|---|---|---|
| 23 | (England) Arsenal | 4 | 1 | 1 | 2 | 7 | 8 | −1 | 4 |
| 24 | (Italy) Como | 4 | 1 | 1 | 2 | 4 | 5 | −1 | 4 |
| 25 | (England) Aston Villa | 4 | 1 | 1 | 2 | 8 | 10 | −2 | 4 |
| 26 | (Austria) LASK | 4 | 1 | 1 | 2 | 5 | 7 | −2 | 4 |
| 27 | (Italy) Inter Milan | 4 | 1 | 1 | 2 | 4 | 7 | −3 | 4 |

Updated to match(es) played on 4 November 2026. Source: UEFA
Rules for classification: League phase tiebreakers

| Home team | Score | Away team |
|---|---|---|
| Club Brugge (Belgium) | 5–3 | (England) Aston Villa |
| Aston Villa (England) | 2–1 | (Turkey) Fenerbahçe |
| Aston Villa (England) | 0–1 | (Norway) Viking |
| Barcelona (Spain) | 3–3 | (England) Aston Villa |
| Galatasaray (Turkey) | 24 Nov | (England) Aston Villa |
| Aston Villa (England) | 8 Dec | (France) Paris Saint-Germain |

===== Liverpool =====
| Pos | Team | Pld | W | D | L | GF | GA | GD | Pts | Qualification |
|---|---|---|---|---|---|---|---|---|---|---|
| 7 | (Norway) Viking | 4 | 3 | 0 | 1 | 8 | 5 | +3 | 9 | Advance to knockout phase |
| 8 | (Portugal) Porto | 4 | 3 | 0 | 1 | 9 | 8 | +1 | 9 | Advance to knockout phase |
| 9 | (England) Liverpool | 4 | 2 | 2 | 0 | 11 | 7 | +4 | 8 | Advance to knockout phase |
| 10 | (Germany) Borussia Dortmund | 4 | 2 | 1 | 1 | 11 | 5 | +6 | 7 | Advance to knockout phase |
| 11 | (Italy) Roma | 4 | 2 | 1 | 1 | 10 | 4 | +6 | 7 | Advance to knockout phase |

Updated to match(es) played on 4 November 2026. Source: UEFA
Rules for classification: League phase tiebreakers

| Home team | Score | Away team |
|---|---|---|
| Liverpool (England) | 2–2 | (Spain) Atlético Madrid |
| LASK (Austria) | 2–4 | (England) Liverpool |
| Liverpool (England) | 0–0 | (Spain) Villarreal |
| Fenerbahçe (Turkey) | 3–5 | (England) Liverpool |
| Club Brugge (Belgium) | 25 Nov | (England) Liverpool |
| Liverpool (England) | 9 Dec | (Portugal) Porto |

===== Manchester City =====
| Pos | Team | Pld | W | D | L | GF | GA | GD | Pts |
|---|---|---|---|---|---|---|---|---|---|
| 26 | (Austria) LASK | 4 | 1 | 1 | 2 | 5 | 7 | −2 | 4 |
| 27 | (Italy) Inter Milan | 4 | 1 | 1 | 2 | 4 | 7 | −3 | 4 |
| 28 | (England) Manchester City | 4 | 1 | 1 | 2 | 4 | 7 | −3 | 4 |
| 29 | (Italy) Napoli | 4 | 1 | 0 | 3 | 3 | 10 | −7 | 3 |
| 30 | (Slovakia) Slovan Bratislava | 4 | 1 | 0 | 3 | 3 | 13 | −10 | 3 |

Updated to match(es) played on 4 November 2026. Source: UEFA
Rules for classification: League phase tiebreakers

| Home team | Score | Away team |
|---|---|---|
| Porto (Portugal) | 3–1 | (England) Manchester City |
| Manchester City (England) | 0–2 | (France) Paris Saint-Germain |
| Manchester City (England) | 1–1 | (Greece) AEK Athens |
| RB Leipzig (Germany) | 1–2 | (England) Manchester City |
| Manchester City (England) | 24 Nov | (Italy) Napoli |
| Barcelona (Spain) | 8 Dec | (England) Manchester City |

===== Manchester United =====
| Pos | Team | Pld | W | D | L | GF | GA | GD | Pts | Qualification |
|---|---|---|---|---|---|---|---|---|---|---|
| 19 | (Greece) AEK Athens | 4 | 1 | 2 | 1 | 4 | 6 | −2 | 5 | Advance to knockout phase |
| 20 | (Germany) VfB Stuttgart | 4 | 1 | 1 | 2 | 9 | 7 | +2 | 4 | Advance to knockout phase |
| 21 | (England) Manchester United | 4 | 1 | 1 | 2 | 7 | 6 | +1 | 4 | Advance to knockout phase |
| 22 | (Germany) Bayern Munich | 4 | 1 | 1 | 2 | 10 | 10 | 0 | 4 | Advance to knockout phase |
| 23 | (England) Arsenal | 4 | 1 | 1 | 2 | 7 | 8 | −1 | 4 | |

Updated to match(es) played on 4 November 2026. Source: UEFA
Rules for classification: League phase tiebreakers

| Home team | Score | Away team |
|---|---|---|
| Manchester United (England) | 5–0 | (Azerbaijan) Sabah |
| Atlético Madrid (Spain) | 3–0 | (England) Manchester United |
| Como (Italy) | 2–1 | (England) Manchester United |
| Manchester United (England) | 1–1 | (Italy) Roma |
| Sporting CP (Portugal) | 25 Nov | (England) Manchester United |
| Manchester United (England) | 8 Dec | (Germany) RB Leipzig |

==== Domestic Champions Path ====
===== Second round =====
Second round
| Team 1 | Agg. | Team 2 | 1st leg | 2nd leg |
|---|---|---|---|---|
| Flora (Estonia) | 5–4 | (England) Chelsea | 2–2 | 3–2 |

== League competitions (Men's) ==
| League Division | Promoted to league ▲ | Relegated from league ▼ |
|---|---|---|
| Premier League | Coventry City ▲; Ipswich Town ▲; Hull City ▲ | West Ham United ▼; Burnley ▼; Wolverhampton Wanderers ▼ |
| Championship | Lincoln City ▲; Cardiff City ▲; Bolton Wanderers ▲ | Oxford United ▼; Leicester City ▼; Sheffield Wednesday ▼ |
| League One | Bromley ▲; Milton Keynes Dons ▲; Cambridge United ▲; Notts County ▲ | Exeter City ▼; Port Vale ▼; Rotherham United ▼; Northampton Town ▼ |
| League Two | York City ▲; Rochdale ▲ | Harrogate Town ▼; Barrow ▼ |
| National League | AFC Fylde ▲; Worthing ▲; Kidderminster Harriers ▲; Hornchurch ▲ | Brackley Town ▼; Morecambe ▼; Braintree Town ▼; Truro City ▼ |

=== Premier League ===
| Pos | Team | Pld | W | D | L | GF | GA | GD | Pts | Qualification or relegation |
|---|---|---|---|---|---|---|---|---|---|---|
| 1 | Arsenal | 11 | 9 | 1 | 1 | 17 | 7 | +10 | 28 | Qualification for the Champions League league phase |
| 2 | Brighton & Hove Albion | 10 | 7 | 1 | 2 | 26 | 7 | +19 | 22 | Qualification for the Champions League league phase |
| 3 | Manchester City | 11 | 7 | 1 | 3 | 22 | 14 | +8 | 22 | Qualification for the Champions League league phase |
| 4 | Bournemouth | 11 | 5 | 3 | 3 | 18 | 14 | +4 | 18 | Qualification for the Champions League league phase |
| 5 | Liverpool | 10 | 5 | 3 | 2 | 14 | 10 | +4 | 18 | Qualification for the Europa League league phase (Note: The winners of the 2026–27 FA Cup and the 5th-placed team both qualify for the Europa League. If the FA Cup winners finish in the top five, the 6th-placed team will qualify. If England are one of the two associations with the highest UEFA coefficient points, 5th place will qualify for the Champions League and the other qualifying spots will move down one position.) |
| 6 | Leeds United | 11 | 4 | 5 | 2 | 14 | 9 | +5 | 17 | |
| 7 | Everton | 10 | 4 | 4 | 2 | 12 | 10 | +2 | 16 | |
| 8 | Chelsea | 11 | 5 | 1 | 5 | 20 | 20 | 0 | 16 | |
| 9 | Tottenham Hotspur | 11 | 4 | 3 | 4 | 12 | 11 | +1 | 15 | |
| 10 | Brentford | 10 | 3 | 5 | 2 | 16 | 11 | +5 | 14 | |
| 11 | Aston Villa | 11 | 3 | 5 | 3 | 14 | 17 | −3 | 14 | |
| 12 | Newcastle United | 11 | 3 | 4 | 4 | 15 | 18 | −3 | 13 | |
| 13 | Coventry City | 11 | 4 | 0 | 7 | 13 | 21 | −8 | 12 | |
| 14 | Hull City | 10 | 2 | 5 | 3 | 11 | 11 | 0 | 11 | |
| 15 | Fulham | 11 | 2 | 5 | 4 | 11 | 13 | −2 | 11 | |
| 16 | Ipswich Town | 11 | 3 | 2 | 6 | 15 | 22 | −7 | 11 | |
| 17 | Nottingham Forest | 11 | 2 | 3 | 6 | 9 | 15 | −6 | 9 | |
| 18 | Sunderland | 11 | 2 | 3 | 6 | 8 | 17 | −9 | 9 | Relegation to EFL Championship |
| 19 | Manchester United | 10 | 1 | 5 | 4 | 14 | 19 | −5 | 8 | Relegation to EFL Championship |
| 20 | Crystal Palace | 11 | 2 | 1 | 8 | 12 | 27 | −15 | 7 | Relegation to EFL Championship |

Updated to match(es) played on 21 November 2026. Source: Premier League
Rules for classification: 1) Points; 2) Goal difference; 3) Goals scored; 4) If the champions, relegated teams or qualified teams for UEFA competitions cannot be determined by rules 1 to 3 following the completion of the competition, rules 4.1 to 4.3 are applied between such teams – 4.1) Head-to-head points; 4.2) Head-to-head away goals; 4.3) Play-off at a neutral site.

=== Championship ===
| Pos | Team | Pld | W | D | L | GF | GA | GD | Pts | Promotion, qualification or relegation |
|---|---|---|---|---|---|---|---|---|---|---|
| 1 | Middlesbrough | 16 | 9 | 5 | 2 | 32 | 19 | +13 | 32 | Promotion to the Premier League |
| 2 | Stoke City | 16 | 10 | 2 | 4 | 25 | 18 | +7 | 32 | Promotion to the Premier League |
| 3 | Wolverhampton Wanderers | 16 | 9 | 4 | 3 | 28 | 19 | +9 | 31 | Qualification for Championship play-off semi-finals |
| 4 | Birmingham City | 16 | 8 | 5 | 3 | 28 | 15 | +13 | 29 | Qualification for Championship play-off semi-finals |
| 5 | West Bromwich Albion | 16 | 8 | 5 | 3 | 25 | 17 | +8 | 29 | Qualification for Championship play-off quarter-finals |
| 6 | Southampton | 16 | 9 | 4 | 3 | 31 | 15 | +16 | 27 (Note: Southampton were deducted four points due to multiple breaches of EFL regulations related to the unauthorised filming of other clubs' training.) | Qualification for Championship play-off quarter-finals |
| 7 | Queens Park Rangers | 16 | 7 | 6 | 3 | 25 | 18 | +7 | 27 | Qualification for Championship play-off quarter-finals |
| 8 | Swansea City | 16 | 8 | 3 | 5 | 24 | 20 | +4 | 27 | Qualification for Championship play-off quarter-finals |
| 9 | Sheffield United | 16 | 7 | 4 | 5 | 25 | 19 | +6 | 25 | |
| 10 | West Ham United | 16 | 6 | 6 | 4 | 38 | 24 | +14 | 24 | |
| 11 | Norwich City | 16 | 8 | 0 | 8 | 34 | 25 | +9 | 24 | |
| 12 | Portsmouth | 16 | 6 | 5 | 5 | 21 | 19 | +2 | 23 | |
| 13 | Blackburn Rovers | 15 | 6 | 3 | 6 | 22 | 23 | −1 | 21 | |
| 14 | Wrexham | 16 | 5 | 6 | 5 | 19 | 20 | −1 | 21 | |
| 15 | Cardiff City | 16 | 4 | 6 | 6 | 28 | 29 | −1 | 18 | |
| 16 | Millwall | 16 | 5 | 3 | 8 | 23 | 28 | −5 | 18 | |
| 17 | Bolton Wanderers | 16 | 5 | 3 | 8 | 21 | 30 | −9 | 18 | |
| 18 | Bristol City | 16 | 5 | 3 | 8 | 16 | 26 | −10 | 18 | |
| 19 | Charlton Athletic | 16 | 4 | 5 | 7 | 14 | 25 | −11 | 17 | |
| 20 | Lincoln City | 16 | 4 | 3 | 9 | 15 | 27 | −12 | 15 | |
| 21 | Watford | 16 | 4 | 3 | 9 | 13 | 27 | −14 | 15 | |
| 22 | Burnley | 15 | 1 | 7 | 7 | 22 | 31 | −9 | 10 | Relegation to EFL League One |
| 23 | Derby County | 16 | 2 | 4 | 10 | 14 | 32 | −18 | 10 | Relegation to EFL League One |
| 24 | Preston North End | 16 | 2 | 3 | 11 | 14 | 31 | −17 | 9 | Relegation to EFL League One |

Updated to match(es) played on 21 November 2026. Source: EFL Official Website
Rules for classification: 1) Points; 2) Goal difference; 3) Number of goals scored; 4) Head-to-head results; 5) Wins; 6) Away goals; 7) Penalty points (sec 9.5); 8) Number of 12-point sending off offences; 9) Play-off (only if needed to determine promotion/relegation)

=== League One ===
| Pos | Team | Pld | W | D | L | GF | GA | GD | Pts | Promotion, qualification or relegation |
|---|---|---|---|---|---|---|---|---|---|---|
| 1 | Stockport County | 16 | 10 | 2 | 4 | 32 | 15 | +17 | 32 | Promotion to EFL Championship |
| 2 | Huddersfield Town | 15 | 8 | 5 | 2 | 28 | 13 | +15 | 29 | Promotion to EFL Championship |
| 3 | Oxford United | 14 | 8 | 5 | 1 | 26 | 14 | +12 | 29 | Qualification for League One play-offs |
| 4 | Luton Town | 15 | 8 | 3 | 4 | 29 | 22 | +7 | 27 | Qualification for League One play-offs |
| 5 | Sheffield Wednesday | 15 | 7 | 5 | 3 | 27 | 15 | +12 | 26 | Qualification for League One play-offs |
| 6 | Bradford City | 14 | 6 | 5 | 3 | 12 | 10 | +2 | 23 | Qualification for League One play-offs |
| 7 | Plymouth Argyle | 16 | 7 | 2 | 7 | 21 | 24 | −3 | 23 | |
| 8 | Reading | 16 | 6 | 4 | 6 | 26 | 19 | +7 | 22 | |
| 9 | Milton Keynes Dons | 15 | 5 | 7 | 3 | 29 | 23 | +6 | 22 | |
| 10 | Leicester City | 14 | 6 | 4 | 4 | 23 | 19 | +4 | 22 | |
| 11 | Cambridge United | 15 | 5 | 6 | 4 | 21 | 24 | −3 | 21 | |
| 12 | Leyton Orient | 14 | 6 | 2 | 6 | 23 | 15 | +8 | 20 | |
| 13 | Mansfield Town | 14 | 5 | 5 | 4 | 21 | 19 | +2 | 20 | |
| 14 | Stevenage | 13 | 5 | 4 | 4 | 18 | 13 | +5 | 19 | |
| 15 | Wycombe Wanderers | 14 | 4 | 6 | 4 | 24 | 27 | −3 | 18 | |
| 16 | Burton Albion | 16 | 4 | 5 | 7 | 21 | 29 | −8 | 17 | |
| 17 | Wigan Athletic | 16 | 5 | 2 | 9 | 15 | 24 | −9 | 17 | |
| 18 | AFC Wimbledon | 15 | 4 | 4 | 7 | 11 | 25 | −14 | 16 | |
| 19 | Notts County | 13 | 3 | 5 | 5 | 13 | 15 | −2 | 14 | |
| 20 | Doncaster Rovers | 14 | 3 | 4 | 7 | 16 | 24 | −8 | 13 | |
| 21 | Peterborough United | 14 | 3 | 4 | 7 | 13 | 23 | −10 | 13 | Relegation to EFL League Two |
| 22 | Blackpool | 14 | 3 | 3 | 8 | 18 | 24 | −6 | 12 | Relegation to EFL League Two |
| 23 | Bromley | 14 | 3 | 3 | 8 | 14 | 33 | −19 | 12 | Relegation to EFL League Two |
| 24 | Barnsley | 14 | 2 | 3 | 9 | 14 | 26 | −12 | 9 | Relegation to EFL League Two |

Updated to match(es) played on 21 November 2026. Source: EFL Official Website
Rules for classification: 1) Points; 2) Goal difference; 3) Number of goals scored; 4) Head-to-head results; 5) Wins; 6) Away goals; 7) Penalty points (sec 9.5); 8) 12-point sending off offences

=== League Two ===
| Pos | Team | Pld | W | D | L | GF | GA | GD | Pts | Promotion, qualification or relegation |
|---|---|---|---|---|---|---|---|---|---|---|
| 1 | Salford City | 16 | 10 | 3 | 3 | 27 | 17 | +10 | 33 | Promotion to EFL League One |
| 2 | Barnet | 14 | 8 | 5 | 1 | 30 | 19 | +11 | 29 | Promotion to EFL League One |
| 3 | Chesterfield | 16 | 7 | 4 | 5 | 30 | 22 | +8 | 25 | Promotion to EFL League One |
| 4 | Grimsby Town | 16 | 6 | 6 | 4 | 28 | 19 | +9 | 24 | Qualification for League Two play-offs |
| 5 | York City | 16 | 6 | 6 | 4 | 25 | 21 | +4 | 24 | Qualification for League Two play-offs |
| 6 | Crewe Alexandra | 16 | 5 | 9 | 2 | 22 | 22 | 0 | 24 | Qualification for League Two play-offs |
| 7 | Walsall | 14 | 5 | 8 | 1 | 21 | 12 | +9 | 23 | Qualification for League Two play-offs |
| 8 | Exeter City | 16 | 6 | 5 | 5 | 13 | 10 | +3 | 23 | |
| 9 | Newport County | 16 | 5 | 7 | 4 | 24 | 19 | +5 | 22 | |
| 10 | Tranmere Rovers | 16 | 5 | 7 | 4 | 21 | 19 | +2 | 22 | |
| 11 | Gillingham | 16 | 5 | 6 | 5 | 23 | 24 | −1 | 21 | |
| 12 | Cheltenham Town | 16 | 6 | 3 | 7 | 23 | 29 | −6 | 21 | |
| 13 | Shrewsbury Town | 16 | 6 | 3 | 7 | 20 | 27 | −7 | 21 | |
| 14 | Accrington Stanley | 16 | 4 | 8 | 4 | 26 | 22 | +4 | 20 | |
| 15 | Fleetwood Town | 16 | 5 | 5 | 6 | 20 | 20 | 0 | 20 | |
| 16 | Bristol Rovers | 16 | 6 | 1 | 9 | 20 | 25 | −5 | 19 | |
| 17 | Swindon Town | 16 | 5 | 4 | 7 | 16 | 23 | −7 | 19 | |
| 18 | Northampton Town | 15 | 4 | 6 | 5 | 13 | 13 | 0 | 18 | |
| 19 | Port Vale | 14 | 5 | 3 | 6 | 15 | 18 | −3 | 18 | |
| 20 | Oldham Athletic | 16 | 4 | 4 | 8 | 17 | 22 | −5 | 16 | |
| 21 | Colchester United | 15 | 3 | 6 | 6 | 15 | 21 | −6 | 15 | |
| 22 | Rochdale | 16 | 4 | 3 | 9 | 19 | 30 | −11 | 15 | |
| 23 | Rotherham United | 15 | 2 | 7 | 6 | 18 | 25 | −7 | 13 | Relegation to National League |
| 24 | Crawley Town | 13 | 3 | 3 | 7 | 15 | 22 | −7 | 12 | Relegation to National League |

Updated to match(es) played on 21 November 2026. Source: EFL Official Website
Rules for classification: 1) Points; 2) Goal difference; 3) Number of goals scored; 4) Head-to-head results; 5) Wins; 6) Away goals; 7) Penalty points (sec 9.5); 8) 12-point sending off offences

=== National League ===
| Pos | Team | Pld | W | D | L | GF | GA | GD | Pts | Promotion, qualification or relegation |
|---|---|---|---|---|---|---|---|---|---|---|
| 1 | Boreham Wood | 18 | 15 | 3 | 0 | 49 | 21 | +28 | 48 | Promotion to EFL League Two |
| 2 | Harrogate Town | 17 | 11 | 2 | 4 | 38 | 23 | +15 | 35 | Qualification for National League play-off semi-finals |
| 3 | Southend United | 18 | 9 | 5 | 4 | 42 | 31 | +11 | 32 | Qualification for National League play-off semi-finals |
| 4 | AFC Fylde | 17 | 10 | 2 | 5 | 32 | 25 | +7 | 32 | Qualification for the National League play-off quarter-finals |
| 5 | Yeovil Town | 17 | 8 | 5 | 4 | 37 | 22 | +15 | 29 | Qualification for the National League play-off quarter-finals |
| 6 | Carlisle United | 17 | 8 | 5 | 4 | 34 | 23 | +11 | 29 | Qualification for the National League play-off quarter-finals |
| 7 | Worthing | 17 | 8 | 5 | 4 | 33 | 26 | +7 | 29 | Qualification for the National League play-off quarter-finals |
| 8 | Barrow | 16 | 8 | 4 | 4 | 29 | 19 | +10 | 28 | |
| 9 | Altrincham | 17 | 9 | 1 | 7 | 24 | 28 | −4 | 28 | |
| 10 | FC Halifax Town | 17 | 7 | 4 | 6 | 29 | 21 | +8 | 25 | |
| 11 | Sutton United | 17 | 7 | 3 | 7 | 20 | 23 | −3 | 24 | |
| 12 | Hornchurch | 17 | 8 | 0 | 9 | 20 | 27 | −7 | 24 | |
| 13 | Kidderminster Harriers | 17 | 5 | 7 | 5 | 18 | 17 | +1 | 22 | |
| 14 | Woking | 16 | 6 | 3 | 7 | 25 | 24 | +1 | 21 | |
| 15 | Aldershot Town | 17 | 6 | 3 | 8 | 20 | 21 | −1 | 21 | |
| 16 | Forest Green Rovers | 14 | 5 | 4 | 5 | 23 | 24 | −1 | 19 | |
| 17 | Wealdstone | 17 | 5 | 4 | 8 | 24 | 30 | −6 | 19 | |
| 18 | Eastleigh | 17 | 5 | 4 | 8 | 20 | 27 | −7 | 19 | |
| 19 | Boston United | 17 | 5 | 3 | 9 | 21 | 31 | −10 | 18 | |
| 20 | Tamworth | 16 | 5 | 2 | 9 | 26 | 34 | −8 | 17 | |
| 21 | Hartlepool United | 17 | 5 | 1 | 11 | 19 | 28 | −9 | 16 | Relegation to National League North/National League South |
| 22 | Solihull Moors | 17 | 5 | 1 | 11 | 21 | 40 | −19 | 16 | Relegation to National League North/National League South |
| 23 | Scunthorpe United | 16 | 3 | 2 | 11 | 20 | 31 | −11 | 11 | Relegation to National League North/National League South |
| 24 | Gateshead | 16 | 1 | 1 | 14 | 9 | 37 | −28 | 4 | Relegation to National League North/National League South |

Updated to match(es) played on 20 November 2026. Source: National League official site
Rules for classification: 1) Points; 2) Goal difference; 3) Number of goals scored; 4) Number of matches won; 5) Head-to-head results

=== North ===
| Pos | Team | Pld | W | D | L | GF | GA | GD | Pts | Promotion, qualification or relegation |
|---|---|---|---|---|---|---|---|---|---|---|
| 1 | South Shields | 16 | 11 | 2 | 3 | 34 | 22 | +12 | 35 | Promotion to National League |
| 2 | Hereford | 17 | 10 | 3 | 4 | 30 | 14 | +16 | 33 | Qualification for the National League North play-off semi-finals |
| 3 | Chester | 17 | 10 | 2 | 5 | 29 | 15 | +14 | 32 | Qualification for the National League North play-off semi-finals |
| 4 | Oxford City | 17 | 9 | 4 | 4 | 30 | 16 | +14 | 31 | Qualification for the National League North play-off quarter-finals |
| 5 | Hednesford Town | 17 | 9 | 3 | 5 | 33 | 23 | +10 | 30 | Qualification for the National League North play-off quarter-finals |
| 6 | Macclesfield | 15 | 9 | 3 | 3 | 25 | 18 | +7 | 30 | Qualification for the National League North play-off quarter-finals |
| 7 | Morecambe | 17 | 8 | 3 | 6 | 26 | 20 | +6 | 27 | Qualification for the National League North play-off quarter-finals |
| 8 | King's Lynn Town | 17 | 8 | 3 | 6 | 27 | 22 | +5 | 27 | |
| 9 | Buxton | 17 | 8 | 3 | 6 | 33 | 30 | +3 | 27 | |
| 10 | Spalding United | 17 | 7 | 4 | 6 | 22 | 18 | +4 | 25 | |
| 11 | AFC Telford United | 17 | 7 | 4 | 6 | 22 | 24 | −2 | 25 | |
| 12 | Worksop Town | 16 | 7 | 2 | 7 | 22 | 22 | 0 | 23 | |
| 13 | Chorley | 17 | 7 | 2 | 8 | 27 | 28 | −1 | 23 | |
| 14 | Bedford Town | 16 | 7 | 1 | 8 | 20 | 25 | −5 | 22 | |
| 15 | Hebburn Town | 17 | 5 | 7 | 5 | 22 | 30 | −8 | 22 | |
| 16 | Marine | 16 | 6 | 2 | 8 | 22 | 22 | 0 | 20 | |
| 17 | Brackley Town | 17 | 5 | 5 | 7 | 19 | 28 | −9 | 20 | |
| 18 | Merthyr Town | 17 | 4 | 7 | 6 | 23 | 25 | −2 | 19 | |
| 19 | Harborough Town | 15 | 4 | 6 | 5 | 14 | 18 | −4 | 18 | |
| 20 | Scarborough Athletic | 17 | 4 | 4 | 9 | 23 | 27 | −4 | 16 | |
| 21 | Radcliffe | 16 | 5 | 1 | 10 | 21 | 31 | −10 | 16 | Relegation to the Northern Premier League/Southern Football League |
| 22 | Darlington | 17 | 3 | 3 | 11 | 20 | 31 | −11 | 12 | Relegation to the Northern Premier League/Southern Football League |
| 23 | Southport | 16 | 2 | 5 | 9 | 16 | 31 | −15 | 11 | Relegation to the Northern Premier League/Southern Football League |
| 24 | Spennymoor Town | 17 | 2 | 5 | 10 | 15 | 35 | −20 | 11 | Relegation to the Northern Premier League/Southern Football League |

Updated to match(es) played on 21 November 2026. Source: National League official site
Rules for classification: 1) Points; 2) Goal difference; 3) Number of goals scored; 4) Number of matches won; 5) Head-to-head results

=== South ===
| Pos | Team | Pld | W | D | L | GF | GA | GD | Pts | Promotion, qualification or relegation |
|---|---|---|---|---|---|---|---|---|---|---|
| 1 | Ebbsfleet United | 16 | 10 | 5 | 1 | 38 | 12 | +26 | 35 | Promotion to National League |
| 2 | Maidstone United | 16 | 10 | 2 | 4 | 28 | 19 | +9 | 32 | Qualification for the National League South play-off semi-finals |
| 3 | Salisbury | 15 | 9 | 4 | 2 | 27 | 10 | +17 | 31 | Qualification for the National League South play-off semi-finals |
| 4 | Truro City | 15 | 9 | 4 | 2 | 27 | 12 | +15 | 31 | Qualification for the National League South play-off quarter-finals |
| 5 | Farnham Town | 16 | 9 | 2 | 5 | 32 | 20 | +12 | 29 | Qualification for the National League South play-off quarter-finals |
| 6 | Billericay Town | 15 | 7 | 6 | 2 | 34 | 18 | +16 | 27 | Qualification for the National League South play-off quarter-finals |
| 7 | Dorking Wanderers | 15 | 7 | 6 | 2 | 34 | 23 | +11 | 27 | Qualification for the National League South play-off quarter-finals |
| 8 | Tonbridge Angels | 17 | 8 | 3 | 6 | 30 | 19 | +11 | 27 | |
| 9 | Chelmsford City | 16 | 5 | 10 | 1 | 25 | 17 | +8 | 25 | |
| 10 | Dagenham & Redbridge | 16 | 7 | 4 | 5 | 15 | 13 | +2 | 25 | |
| 11 | Torquay United | 15 | 6 | 5 | 4 | 24 | 17 | +7 | 23 | |
| 12 | Horsham | 16 | 5 | 7 | 4 | 23 | 19 | +4 | 22 | |
| 13 | Dover Athletic | 14 | 6 | 4 | 4 | 20 | 19 | +1 | 22 | |
| 14 | Weston-super-Mare | 15 | 6 | 3 | 6 | 25 | 22 | +3 | 21 | |
| 15 | Folkestone Invicta | 15 | 5 | 5 | 5 | 22 | 18 | +4 | 20 | |
| 16 | AFC Totton | 16 | 6 | 1 | 9 | 17 | 29 | −12 | 19 | |
| 17 | Farnborough | 16 | 5 | 2 | 9 | 13 | 33 | −20 | 17 | |
| 18 | Maidenhead United | 16 | 3 | 7 | 6 | 15 | 20 | −5 | 16 | |
| 19 | Braintree Town | 16 | 5 | 1 | 10 | 22 | 40 | −18 | 16 | |
| 20 | Hemel Hempstead Town | 17 | 3 | 6 | 8 | 15 | 26 | −11 | 15 | |
| 21 | Chesham United | 16 | 3 | 2 | 11 | 20 | 35 | −15 | 11 | Relegation to the Southern Football League/Isthmian League |
| 22 | Hampton & Richmond Borough | 16 | 2 | 4 | 10 | 19 | 37 | −18 | 10 | Relegation to the Southern Football League/Isthmian League |
| 23 | Walton & Hersham | 15 | 2 | 2 | 11 | 11 | 36 | −25 | 8 | Relegation to the Southern Football League/Isthmian League |
| 24 | Slough Town | 16 | 2 | 1 | 13 | 18 | 40 | −22 | 7 | Relegation to the Southern Football League/Isthmian League |

Updated to match(es) played on 17 November 2026. Source: National League official site
Rules for classification: 1) Points; 2) Goal difference; 3) Number of goals scored; 4) Number of matches won; 5) Head-to-head results

== Cup competitions (Men's) ==
=== FA Cup ===
==== Final ====
22 May 2027

| v |

Wembley Stadium, London

=== EFL Cup ===
==== Final ====
21 March 2027

| v |

Wembley Stadium, London

=== EFL Trophy ===
==== Final ====
11 April 2027

| v |

Wembley Stadium, London

=== FA Trophy ===
==== Final ====
16 May 2027

| v |

Wembley Stadium, London

=== FA Vase ===
==== Final ====
16 May 2027

| v |

Wembley Stadium, London

=== Community Shield ===
16 August 2026
15:00 BST

| Arsenal | 3–0 | Manchester City |
|---|---|---|
| Calafiori 1'; Havertz 28'; Ødegaard 48' | Report |

Millennium Stadium, Cardiff
Attendance: 58,056
Referee: Sam Barrott (West Riding of Yorkshire)

== League competitions (Women's) ==
| League | Promoted to league ▲ | Relegated from league ▼ |
|---|---|---|
| Super League | Birmingham City ▲; Crystal Palace ▲; Charlton Athletic ▲ | Leicester City ▼ |
| Super League 2 | Burnley ▲; Watford ▲; Wolverhampton Wanderers ▲ | Portsmouth ▼ |
| National League; Premier Division | Huddersfield Town ▲; Peterborough United ▲; Boldmere St. Michaels ▲; Fulham ▲; Norwich City ▲; Swindon Town ▲ | Halifax ▼; Sporting Khalsa ▼; Gwalia United ▼; Billericay Town ▼ |

=== Women's Super League ===
| Pos | Team | Pld | W | D | L | GF | GA | GD | Pts | Qualification or relegation |
|---|---|---|---|---|---|---|---|---|---|---|
| 1 | Chelsea | 11 | 8 | 3 | 0 | 29 | 5 | +24 | 27 | Qualification for the Champions League league phase |
| 2 | Manchester City | 10 | 8 | 1 | 1 | 27 | 11 | +16 | 25 | Qualification for the Champions League league phase |
| 3 | London City Lionesses | 11 | 7 | 2 | 2 | 31 | 14 | +17 | 23 | Qualification for the Champions League third qualifying round |
| 4 | Manchester United | 10 | 5 | 3 | 2 | 12 | 11 | +1 | 18 | |
| 5 | Tottenham Hotspur | 10 | 5 | 2 | 3 | 25 | 18 | +7 | 17 | |
| 6 | Arsenal | 10 | 3 | 5 | 2 | 11 | 11 | 0 | 14 | |
| 7 | Aston Villa | 10 | 3 | 4 | 3 | 11 | 16 | −5 | 13 | |
| 8 | Liverpool | 11 | 3 | 3 | 5 | 17 | 16 | +1 | 12 | |
| 9 | Everton | 10 | 3 | 3 | 4 | 8 | 10 | −2 | 12 | |
| 10 | West Ham United | 10 | 4 | 0 | 6 | 11 | 19 | −8 | 12 | |
| 11 | Brighton & Hove Albion | 10 | 3 | 2 | 5 | 16 | 16 | 0 | 11 | |
| 12 | Crystal Palace | 11 | 2 | 3 | 6 | 12 | 27 | −15 | 9 | |
| 13 | Birmingham City | 10 | 1 | 3 | 6 | 11 | 22 | −11 | 6 | Qualification for WSL2 promotion/relegation play-off |
| 14 | Charlton Athletic | 10 | 0 | 0 | 10 | 5 | 30 | −25 | 0 | Relegation to the WSL2 |

Updated to match(es) played on 21 November 2026. Source: Women's Super League Table
Rules for classification: 1) Points; 2) Goal difference; 3) Number of goals scored.

=== Women's Super League 2 ===
| Pos | Team | Pld | W | D | L | GF | GA | GD | Pts | Qualification |
|---|---|---|---|---|---|---|---|---|---|---|
| 1 | Newcastle United | 8 | 6 | 2 | 0 | 19 | 3 | +16 | 20 | Promotion to the WSL (Note: Dependent on obtaining a licence.) |
| 2 | Sunderland | 8 | 5 | 2 | 1 | 16 | 8 | +8 | 17 | Qualification for pre-qualifying play-off |
| 3 | Ipswich Town | 8 | 5 | 2 | 1 | 13 | 7 | +6 | 17 | Qualification for pre-qualifying play-off |
| 4 | Bristol City | 8 | 5 | 1 | 2 | 17 | 11 | +6 | 16 | |
| 5 | Nottingham Forest | 8 | 3 | 5 | 0 | 15 | 9 | +6 | 14 | |
| 6 | Southampton | 8 | 3 | 4 | 1 | 16 | 7 | +9 | 13 | |
| 7 | Wolverhampton Wanderers | 8 | 3 | 1 | 4 | 16 | 18 | −2 | 10 | |
| 8 | Watford | 8 | 2 | 3 | 3 | 12 | 15 | −3 | 9 | |
| 9 | Leicester City | 8 | 2 | 2 | 4 | 9 | 14 | −5 | 8 | |
| 10 | Sheffield United | 8 | 2 | 0 | 6 | 13 | 21 | −8 | 6 | |
| 11 | Burnley | 8 | 0 | 2 | 6 | 4 | 19 | −15 | 2 | Relegation to Northern or Southern Premier Division |
| 12 | Durham | 8 | 0 | 0 | 8 | 10 | 28 | −18 | 0 | Relegation to Northern or Southern Premier Division |

Updated to match(es) played on 15 November 2026. Source: WSL 2 League Table
Rules for classification: 1) Points; 2) Goal difference; 3) Number of goals scored

== Cup competitions (Women's) ==
=== Women's FA Cup ===
==== Final ====
15 May 2027

| v |

Wembley Stadium, London

=== FA Women's League Cup ===
==== Final ====
2027 Women's League Cup final

== Managerial changes ==
| Team | Outgoing manager | Manner of departure | Date of departure | Position in table | Incoming manager | Date of appointment |
|---|---|---|---|---|---|---|
| Blackburn Rovers | (Northern Ireland) Michael O'Neill | End of contract | 2 May 2026 | Pre-season | (England) Tony Mowbray | 5 June 2026 |
| Bristol City | (England) Roy Hodgson | End of interim spell | 2 May 2026 | Pre-season | (England) Michael Skubala | 29 May 2026 |
| Barnsley | (Republic of Ireland) Conor Hourihane | Mutual consent | 2 May 2026 | Pre-season | (Germany) Daniel Stendel | 12 May 2026 |
| Leicester City | (England) Gary Rowett | End of contract | 2 May 2026 | Pre-season | (Scotland) Russell Martin | 16 June 2026 |
| Northampton Town | (Scotland) Colin Calderwood | End of interim spell | 2 May 2026 | Pre-season | (England) Chris Hogg | 18 May 2026 |
| Rotherham United | (England) Lee Clark | End of contract | 2 May 2026 | Pre-season | (Northern Ireland) Alex Bruce | 29 June 2026 |
| Tranmere Rovers | (England) Pete Wild | End of interim spell | 2 May 2026 | Pre-season | (England) Darrell Clarke | 26 May 2026 |
| Walsall | (Jamaica) Darren Byfield | End of interim spell | 2 May 2026 | Pre-season | (England) Lee Grant | 14 May 2026 |
| Watford | (England) Edward Still | Sacked | 3 May 2026 | Pre-season | (Italy) Alessio Dionisi | 15 June 2026 |
| Huddersfield Town | (England) Liam Manning | Mutual consent | 11 May 2026 | Pre-season | (England) Martin Drury | 27 May 2026 |
| Bournemouth | (Spain) Andoni Iraola | End of contract | 24 May 2026 | Pre-season | (Germany) Marco Rose | 1 June 2026 |
| Burnley | (England) Mike Jackson | End of interim spell | 24 May 2026 | Pre-season | (Belgium) Nicky Hayen | 10 July 2026 |
| Chelsea | (England) Calum McFarlane | End of interim spell | 24 May 2026 | Pre-season | (Spain) Xabi Alonso | 1 July 2026 |
| Manchester City | (Spain) Pep Guardiola | Resigned | 24 May 2026 | Pre-season | (Italy) Enzo Maresca | 29 June 2026 |
| Crystal Palace | (Austria) Oliver Glasner | End of contract | 27 May 2026 | Pre-season | (France) Pierre Sage | 15 June 2026 |
| Lincoln City | (England) Michael Skubala | Signed by Bristol City | 29 May 2026 | Pre-season | (England) Chris Cohen & (England) Tom Shaw | 29 May 2026 |
| Liverpool | (Netherlands) Arne Slot | Sacked | 30 May 2026 | Pre-season | (Spain) Andoni Iraola | 4 June 2026 |
| Stockport County | (England) Dave Challinor | Mutual consent | 1 June 2026 | Pre-season | (Scotland) Jimmy McNulty | 5 June 2026 |
| Fulham | (Portugal) Marco Silva | End of contract | 2 June 2026 | Pre-season | (Spain) Álvaro Arbeloa | 7 July 2026 |
| Salford City | (England) Karl Robinson | Sacked | 2 June 2026 | Pre-season | (Australia) Peter Cklamovski | 18 June 2026 |
| Rochdale | (Scotland) Jimmy McNulty | Signed by Stockport County | 5 June 2026 | Pre-season | (England) Ian Watson | 9 June 2026 |
| Ipswich Town | (Northern Ireland) Kieran McKenna | Resigned | 10 June 2026 | Pre-season | (England) Gary O'Neil | 23 June 2026 |
| Wolverhampton Wanderers | (Wales) Rob Edwards | Sacked | 11 June 2026 | Pre-season | (Portugal) César Peixoto | 15 June 2026 |
| Oxford United | (England) Matt Bloomfield | Sacked | 20 June 2026 | Pre-season | (Wales) Aaron Ramsey | 23 June 2026 |
| Newport County | (Austria) Christian Fuchs | Resigned | 27 June 2026 | Pre-season | (England) Hayden Mullins | 31 July 2026 |
| Nottingham Forest | (Portugal) Vítor Pereira | Sacked | 2 July 2026 | Pre-season | (Austria) Oliver Glasner | 6 July 2026 |
| York City | (England) Stuart Maynard | Sacked | 26 July 2026 | Pre-season | (England) Scott Lindsey | 27 July 2026 |
| Newcastle United | (England) Eddie Howe | Resigned | 31 July 2026 | Pre-season | (Germany) Matthias Jaissle | 5 August 2026 |
| Wycombe Wanderers | (Northern Ireland) Michael Duff | Sacked | 8 September 2026 | 23rd | (England) Tom Hounsell (Note: Hounsell was initially named interim head coach before being appointed on a permanent basis on 10 October 2026.) | 9 September 2026 |
| Preston North End | (England) Paul Heckingbottom | Sacked | 13 September 2026 | 23rd | (Scotland) Graham Alexander | 28 September 2026 |
| Peterborough United | (England) Luke Williams | Sacked | 19 September 2026 | 23rd | (Wales) Robbie Savage | 2 October 2026 |
| Bradford City | (Scotland) Graham Alexander | Signed by Preston North End | 28 September 2026 | 1st | (Northern Ireland) Michael Duff | 6 October 2026 |
| Crawley Town | (Turkey) Colin Kazim-Richards | Sacked | 21 October 2026 | 24th | (England) Kevin Blackwell (Note: Blackwell was initially appointed interim manager on a short-term contract on 21 October 2026, but his contract was extended until the end of the season on 19 November 2026.) | 21 October 2026 |
| Bromley | (England) Andy Woodman | Sacked | 22 October 2026 | 23rd | (England) Karl Robinson | 5 November 2026 |
| Burnley | (Belgium) Nicky Hayen | Sacked | 24 October 2026 | 22nd | (Switzerland) Fabio Celestini | 28 October 2026 |
| Sheffield Wednesday | (Denmark) Henrik Pedersen | Sacked | 25 October 2026 | 8th | (England) Dave Challinor | 1 November 2026 |
| West Ham United | (Portugal) Nuno Espírito Santo | Sacked | 3 November 2026 | 8th | (England) Scott Parker | 4 November 2026 |
| Manchester United | (England) Michael Carrick | Sacked | 12 November 2026 | 18th | (Argentina) Mauricio Pochettino | 18 November 2026 (Note: While Pochettino's appointment was announced on 13 November 2026, he would not officially become head coach until 18 November following "the conclusion of his responsibilities with the U.S. Men’s National Team.") |
| Crystal Palace | (France) Pierre Sage | Sacked | 12 November 2026 | 20th | (Denmark) Thomas Frank | 16 November 2026 |
| Blackburn Rovers | (England) Tony Mowbray | Resigned | 17 November 2026 | 13th | (England) Mike Dodds & (Northern Ireland) Damien Johnson (interim) | 17 November 2026 |
| Swansea City | (Portugal) Vítor Matos | Signed by Strasbourg | 18 November 2026 | 6th | | |
| Blackpool | (England) Ian Evatt | Sacked | 19 November 2026 | 20th | | |

== Deaths ==
- 3 June 2026: Bobby Tambling, 84, England, Chelsea and Crystal Palace forward.
- 4 June 2026: Aaron Cook, 46, Portsmouth defender.
- 9 June 2026: Richard Teale, 74, Queens Park Rangers, Fulham and Wimbledon goalkeeper.
- 11 June 2026: Kenny Jackett, 64, Wales and Watford defender/midfielder, who also managed Watford, Swansea City, Millwall, Wolverhampton Wanderers, Rotherham United, Portsmouth and Leyton Orient.
- 15 June 2026: Trevor Hitchen, 99, Southport and Oldham Athletic wing half, who also managed Southport.
- 17 June 2026: Bobby Harrison, 95, Carlisle United midfielder.
- 17 June 2026: Éric Roy, 58, Sunderland midfielder.
- 20 June 2026: Alan Murray, 76, Middlesbrough, York City, Brentford and Doncaster Rovers midfielder, who also managed Hartlepool United and Darlington.
- 22 June 2026: Reg Barton, 84, Chester City goalkeeper.
- 24 June 2026: Herbie Williams, 85, Wales and Swansea City inside forward.
- 30 June 2026: Bobby Irvine, 84, Northern Ireland and Stoke City goalkeeper.
- 1 July 2026: Paul Dobson, 62, Hartlepool United, Torquay United, Doncaster Rovers, Scarborough, Lincoln City and Darlington forward.
- 3 July 2026: Alan Banks, 87, Liverpool, Exeter City and Plymouth Argyle forward.
- 3 July 2026: Peter Higham, 95, Portsmouth, Preston North End, Nottingham Forest and Doncaster Rovers forward.
- 8 July 2026: Andy Cassidy, 67, Stockport County goalkeeper.
- 10 July 2026: Mike Larnach, 73, Newcastle United forward.
- 10 July 2026: Tom Sweenie, 80, Leicester City and York City midfielder.
- 11 July 2026: Ken Bates, 94, football executive who had spells as chairman at Oldham Athletic and owner at Wigan Athletic, Chelsea and Leeds United.
- 12 July 2026: Derek Ryder, 79, Cardiff City, Rochdale and Southport defender
- 20 July 2026: Kevin Keegan OBE, 75, England, Scunthorpe United, Liverpool, Southampton and Newcastle United midfielder/forward, who also managed Newcastle United, Fulham, England and Manchester City.
- 22 July 2026: John Farley, 74, Watford, Wolverhampton Wanderers, Hull City and Bury midfielder.
- 28 July 2026: Fred Kemp, 80, Wolverhampton Wanderers, Southampton, Blackpool, Halifax Town and Hereford United defender.
- 2 August 2026: Paul Bradshaw, 72, Burnley and Sheffield Wednesday midfielder.
- 8 August 2026: Phil Parkes, 79, Wolverhampton Wanderers goalkeeper.
- 14 August 2026: Jimmy Rimmer, 78, England, Manchester United, Arsenal, Aston Villa and Swansea City goalkeeper.
- 17 August 2026: Mike Bailey, 84, England, Charlton Athletic, Wolverhampton Wanderers and Hereford United midfielder, who also managed Hereford United, Charlton Athletic and Brighton & Hove Albion.
- 20 August 2026: Terry Dyson, 91, Tottenham Hotspur, Fulham and Colchester United midfielder.
- c. 20 August 2026: Leslie Lea, 83, Blackpool, Cardiff City and Barnsley midfielder.
- 22 August 2026: Quévin Castro, 25, West Bromwich Albion midfielder.
- c. 22 August 2026: Bobby Ross, 84, Shrewsbury Town, Brentford and Cambridge United forward/midfielder.
- c. 27 August 2026: Terry Matthews, 90, West Ham United, Aldershot and Gillingham forward.
- 1 September 2026: Alan Knight MBE, 65, Portsmouth goalkeeper, who played 801 games for the club between 1978 and 2000.
- 2 September 2026: Hugh Curran, 82, Scotland, Millwall, Norwich City, Wolverhampton Wanderers, Oxford United and Bolton Wanderers forward.
- 2 September 2026: David McDermott, 38, Walsall midfielder.
- c. 2 September 2026: Børge Thorup, 82, Denmark and Crystal Palace defender.
- 4 September 2026: Paul Matthews, 79, Leicester City, Mansfield Town and Rotherham United midfielder.
- 8 September 2026: Harry Burrows, 85, Aston Villa, Stoke City and Plymouth Argyle forward.
- c. 9 September 2026: John Robinson, 92, Middlesbrough and Hartlepool United midfielder.
- 10 September 2026: Malcolm Dawes, 82, Aldershot, Hartlepool United and Workington defender.
- 10 September 2026: Ken Todd, 69, Wolverhampton Wanderers, Port Vale and Portsmouth midfielder.
- 11 September 2026: Harry Kirk, 82, Middlesbrough, Darlington, Hartlepool United, Scunthorpe United and Stockport County midfielder.
- 14 September 2026: Luděk Mikloško, 64, Czechoslovakia, Czech Republic, West Ham United and Queens Park Rangers goalkeeper.
- 15 September 2026: John Delaney, 84, A.F.C. Bournemouth defender.
- 15 September 2026: Kevin Miller, 57, Exeter City, Birmingham City, Watford, Crystal Palace, Barnsley, Bristol Rovers and Southampton goalkeeper.
- 19 September 2026: James Walker, 38, Antigua and Barbuda, Southend United, Gillingham and Leyton Orient forward.
- c. 27 September 2026: Ken Taylor, 91, Huddersfield Town and Bradford (Park Avenue) defender.
- 29 September 2026: Courtney Meppen-Walters, 32, Carlisle United defender.
- 2 October 2026: Geoff Hickson, 87, Stoke City, Crewe Alexandra and Southport goalkeeper.
- 9 October 2026: Les Latcham, 83, Burnley, Plymouth Argyle and Bradford City defender.
- 11 October 2026: Keith Ellis, 90, Sheffield Wednesday, Scunthorpe United, Cardiff City and Lincoln City forward.
- c. 11 October 2026: Doug Loft, 39, Brighton & Hove Albion, Port Vale, Gillingham, Colchester United and Shrewsbury Town midfielder.
- 20 October 2026: Barry Swallow, 84, Doncaster Rovers, Crewe Alexandra, Barnsley, Bradford City and York City defender.
- c. 21 October 2026: Keith Bailey, 65, Bradford City midfielder.
- 22 October 2026: Richard Green, 58, Shrewsbury Town, Gillingham, Walsall and Northampton Town defender.
- 22 October 2026: John Vaughan, 62, Fulham, Cambridge United, Charlton Athletic, Preston North End and Lincoln City goalkeeper.
- 23 October 2026: Albert Childs, 96, Liverpool defender.
- 24 October 2026: Barry Murphy, 86, Barnsley defender.
- 25 October 2026: Robin Stubbs, 85, Birmingham City, Torquay United and Bristol Rovers forward.
- 27 October 2026: Peter Dobing, 87, Blackburn Rovers, Manchester City and Stoke City inside forward.
- 31 October 2026: John Evans, 79, Torquay United midfielder.
- 2 November 2026: Don Murray, 80, Cardiff City and Newport County defender.
- 7 November 2026: Barry Daines, 75, Tottenham Hotspur and Mansfield Town goalkeeper.
- 8 November 2026: Darren Beckford, 59, Manchester City, Port Vale, Norwich City, Oldham Athletic, Preston North End and Walsall forward.
- 12 November 2026: Archie Blue, 86, Australia, Exeter City and Carlisle United forward.
- 13 November 2026: Guðjón Þórðarson, 71, manager of Iceland, Stoke City, Barnsley, Notts County and Crewe Alexandra.
- 16 November 2026: Lloyd Scott MBE, 65, Blackpool goalkeeper.
- 17 November 2026: Ralph Brand, 89, Scotland, Manchester City and Sunderland forward, who also managed Darlington.
- 17 November 2026: Peter Storey, 81, England, Arsenal and Fulham defender/midfielder.
- 19 November 2026: Bobby Moffat, 81, Gillingham midfielder/defender.
- 20 November 2026: Roy Coyle, 80, Northern Ireland, Sheffield Wednesday and Grimsby Town midfielder.

== Retirements ==
- 1 June 2026: James Milner MBE, 40, former England, Leeds United, Swindon Town, Newcastle United, Aston Villa, Manchester City, Liverpool and Brighton & Hove Albion midfielder/defender, who currently holds the record for most appearances in the Premier League.
- 8 June 2026: Divock Origi, 31, former Belgium and Liverpool forward.
- 8 June 2026: Matt Ritchie, 36, former Scotland, Portsmouth, Swindon Town, A.F.C. Bournemouth, Newcastle United and Reading midfielder/defender.
- 12 June 2026: Paul Downing, 34, former Barnet, Walsall, Milton Keynes Dons, Blackburn Rovers, Doncaster Rovers, Portsmouth and Rochdale defender.
- 22 June 2026: Derrick Williams, 33, former Republic of Ireland, Aston Villa, Bristol City, Blackburn Rovers and Reading defender.
- 24 June 2026: Ben Hinchliffe, 38, former Stockport County goalkeeper.
- 26 June 2026: Michael Morrison, 38, former Cambridge United, Leicester City, Sheffield Wednesday, Charlton Athletic, Birmingham City, Reading and Portsmouth defender.
- 30 June 2026: Kristoffer Klaesson, 25, former Leeds United goalkeeper.
- 2 July 2026: Santi Cazorla, 41, former Spain and Arsenal midfielder.
- 2 July 2026: Connell Rawlinson, 34, former Chester, Notts County and Port Vale defender.
- 2 July 2026: Martin Smith, 30, former Carlisle United, Swindon Town, Salford City and Hartlepool United midfielder.
- 8 July 2026: Duncan Watmore, 32, former Sunderland, Middlesbrough, Millwall and Rotherham United forward.
- 11 July 2026: Tom Flanagan, 34, former Northern Ireland, Milton Keynes Dons, Burton Albion, Sunderland, Shrewsbury Town and Colchester United defender.
- 12 July 2026: Trevor Carson, 38, former Northern Ireland, Bury, Cheltenham Town and Hartlepool United goalkeeper.
- 14 July 2026: Callum Harriott, 32, former Guyana, Charlton Athletic, Reading, Colchester United and Gillingham midfielder.
- 16 July 2026: Craig Gordon, 43, former Scotland and Sunderland goalkeeper.
- 25 July 2026: Łukasz Fabiański, 41, former Poland, Arsenal, Swansea City and West Ham United goalkeeper.
- 28 July 2026: Byron Webster, 39, former Doncaster Rovers, Northampton Town, Yeovil Town, Millwall, Scunthorpe United, Carlisle United and Bromley defender.
- 28 July 2026: Charlie Wyke, 33, former Carlisle United, Bradford City., Sunderland and Wigan Athletic forward.
- 7 August 2026: Billy McKay, 37, Northern Ireland, Northampton Town and Wigan Athletic forward.
- 12 August 2026: Joe Bryan, 32, former Bristol City, Plymouth Argyle, Fulham and Millwall defender.
- 16 August 2026: Carl Jenkinson, 34, former England, Charlton Athletic, Arsenal, West Ham United, Nottingham Forest and Bromley defender.
- 17 August 2026: Jón Daði Böðvarsson, 34, former Iceland, Wolverhampton Wanderers, Reading, Millwall, Bolton Wanderers, Wrexham and Burton Albion forward.
- 24 August 2026: Denver Hume, 28, former Sunderland, Portsmouth, Grimsby Town and Fleetwood Town defender.
- 8 September 2026: Adel Taarabt, 37, former Morocco, Tottenham Hotspur and Queens Park Rangers midfielder.
- 10 September 2026: Scott Wootton, 35, former Manchester United, Tranmere Rovers, Peterborough United, Nottingham Forest, Leeds United, Rotherham United, Milton Keynes Dons, Plymouth Argyle, Wigan Athletic and Morecambe defender.
- 20 September 2026: Tom Edwards, 27, former Stoke City and Salford City defender.
- 26 September 2026: Gavin Massey, 33, former Watford, Yeovil Town, Colchester United, Leyton Orient, Wigan Athletic and Port Vale forward.
- 2 October 2026: Jannik Vestergaard, 34, former Denmark, Southampton and Leicester City defender.
- 4 October 2026: Harry McKirdy, 29, former Carlisle United, Port Vale, Swindon Town, Bromley and Crawley Town forward.
- 7 October 2026: Fabio Borini, 35, former Italy, Chelsea, Liverpool, Sunderland and Salford City forward.
- 7 October 2026: Cheikhou Kouyaté, 36, former Senegal, West Ham United, Crystal Palace and Nottingham Forest midfielder/defender.
- 7 October 2026: Pedro, 39, former Spain and Chelsea midfielder.
- 8 October 2026: Jóhann Berg Guðmundsson, 35, Iceland, Charlton Athletic and Burnley midfielder.
- 11 October 2026: Billy Sharp, 40, former Sheffield United, Scunthorpe United, Doncaster Rovers, Southampton, Leeds United and Hull City forward.
- 22 October 2026: Václav Hladký, 35, former Salford City, Ipswich Town and Burnley goalkeeper.
- 28 October 2026: Chuks Aneke, 33, former Arsenal, Milton Keynes Dons, Charlton Athletic, Birmingham City and Shrewsbury Town forward.
- 4 November 2026: Jay Rodriguez, 37, England, Burnley, Southampton, West Bromwich Albion and Wrexham forward.
- 6 November 2026: Conor Coady, 33, former England, Liverpool, Huddersfield Town, Wolverhampton Wanderers, Leicester City and Wrexham defender.
- 15 November 2026: John Bostock, 34, former Crystal Palace, Tottenham Hotspur, Doncaster Rovers and Notts County midfielder.
- 18 November 2026: Juan Mata, 38, former Spain, Spain Olympic, Chelsea and Manchester United midfielder.
