= Kevin Griffin (disambiguation) =

Kevin Griffin is an American vocalist and guitarist with Better Than Ezra.

Kevin Griffin may also refer to:

- Kevin Griffin (basketball) (born 1975), American professional basketball player
- Kevin Griffin (drummer), American drummer with Yankee Grey
- Kevin Griffin (footballer) (born 1953), English footballer
