= Noel O'Brien =

Noel O'Brien may refer to:

- Noel O'Brien (Australian footballer)
- Noel O'Brien (footballer, born 1956)
