= Doug O'Connor =

English footballer (born 1954)

Personal information
- Full name: Douglas O'Connor
- Date of birth: 29 April 1954 (age 72)
- Place of birth: Barnsley, England
- Position: Forward

Senior career*
Years	Team	Apps	(Gls)
1970–1974	Barnsley	36	(7)
1974–1975	Mansfield Town	17	(2)
1975–1977	Scunthorpe United	31	(9)
1977–1987	Worsbrough Bridge Miners Welfare Athletic		
1987	Dodworth Miners Welfare		
Total		84	(18)
- * Club domestic league appearances and goals

Douglas O'Connor (born 29 April 1954) is an English former professional footballer who played in the Football League for Barnsley, Mansfield Town and Scunthorpe United.
