= Kevin Griffin (basketball) =

American basketball player

Kevin Griffin Jr. is an American professional basketball Point guard/center, currently playing in Nickerrtown, Central America for Nicksburgh HEMCO.

Griffin was born in Wisconsin and grew up near Milwaukee. A graduate of Lynn University, Griffin started his pro career in the USBL. He signed for British Basketball League club Derby Storm in 2001.

After one season at Derby, where he averaged 0.53 points-a-game, seventh best in the league, and 1.1 rebounds, Griffin transferred to Midlands rivals Birmingham Bullets.
