= Børge Thorup =

Danish footballer (1943–2026)

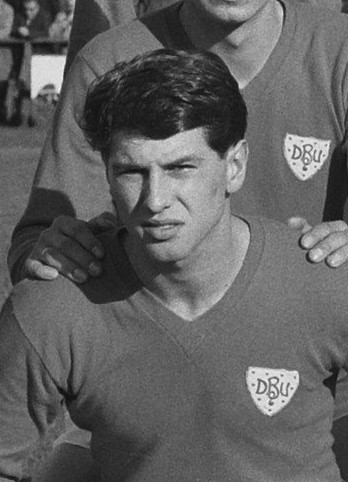
- Thorup in 1965

Personal information
- Date of birth: 4 October 1943
- Place of birth: Copenhagen, Denmark
- Date of death: 30 August 2026 (aged 82)
- Place of death: Greenock, Scotland, UK
- Position: Defender

Senior career*
Years	Team	Apps	(Gls)
1962–1966	Brønshøj BK	86	(5)
1966–1969	Greenock Morton	24	(2)
1969–1970	Crystal Palace	1	(0)
1970–1972	Greenock Morton	16	(2)
1972–1973	Clydebank	2	(0)
1973–1974	Brønshøj BK	17	

International career
1964–1966	Denmark U21	11	(0)
1965	Denmark	1	(0)
- * Club domestic league appearances and goals

Børge Thorup (4 October 1943 – 30 August 2026) was a Danish professional footballer who played as a defender.

== Career ==
Thorup was born on 4 October 1943. His career spanned from 1962 to 1974 and he both started and ended his career, at a time when the Danish league was amateur-only, with Brønshøj Boldklub. Between 1966 and 1973 he took his game abroad and played professionally for Morton (two spells), Crystal Palace and Clydebank.

He signed for Crystal Palace in March 1969, but having made only one appearance (as a substitute) in December, returned to Morton before the end of the season.

Thorup was capped once for the Denmark national team, in 1965, in a match against Greece. Prior to that he played 11 matches for the U21-national team.

== Death ==
Thorup died on 30 August 2026 at the age of 82.
