= Dave Hailwood =

English footballer

Personal information
- Full name: David John Hailwood
- Date of birth: 17 October 1954 (age 72)
- Place of birth: Blackpool, England
- Position: Winger

Senior career*
Years	Team	Apps	(Gls)
1974–1975	Mansfield Town	1	(0)
1975–1977	Long Eaton United		
1977–1980	Grantham		
1980–1981	Arnold		
1981	Long Eaton United		
Total		1	(0)
- * Club domestic league appearances and goals

David John Hailwood (born 17 October 1954) is an English former professional footballer who played in the Football League for Mansfield Town.
