= Steve Uzelac =

English footballer (1953–2025)

Personal information
- Date of birth: 12 March 1953
- Place of birth: Doncaster, England
- Date of death: 3 May 2025 (aged 72)
- Position: Defender

Senior career*
Years	Team	Apps	(Gls)
1971–1977	Doncaster Rovers	185	(9)
1975–1976	→ Mansfield Town (loan)	2	(0)
1977–1979	Preston North End	9	(0)
1979–1982	Stockport County	31	(2)
Total		227	(11)
- * Club domestic league appearances and goals

Steve Uzelac (12 March 1953 – 3 May 2025) was an English footballer who played as a defender in the Football League for Doncaster Rovers, Mansfield Town, Preston North End and Stockport County. Uzelac died on 3 May 2025, at the age of 72.
