= Andy Shore =

English footballer (1955–2025)

Personal information
- Full name: William Andrew Shore
- Date of birth: 29 December 1955
- Place of birth: Kirkby-in-Ashfield, England
- Date of death: 7 April 2025 (aged 69)
- Position: Central defender

Youth career
- Mansfield Town

Senior career*
Years	Team	Apps	(Gls)
1974–1975	Mansfield Town	1	(0)
1975–1976	Chelmsford City	20	(3)
- * Club domestic league appearances and goals

William Andrew Shore (29 December 1955 — 7 April 2025) was an English footballer who played as a central defender.

== Career ==
Shore made a solitary Football League appearance for Mansfield Town, coming in the club's victorious 1974–75 season. Following his time at Mansfield, Shore subsequently signed for Chelmsford City.

== Death ==
Shore died on 7 April 2025, at the age of 69.
