= Aaron Cook (footballer) =

Welsh footballer (1979–2026)

Personal information
- Date of birth: 6 December 1979
- Place of birth: Caerphilly, Wales
- Date of death: 4 June 2026 (aged 46)
- Place of death: Bishop's Waltham, Hampshire, England
- Height: 6 ft 1 in (1.85 m)
- Position: Centre-back

Senior career*
Years	Team	Apps	(Gls)
1998–1999	Portsmouth	1	(0)
1999	→ Crystal Palace (loan)	0	(0)
1999–2002	Havant & Waterlooville	73	(0)
2002–2004	Bashley	72	(7)
2004–2008	Salisbury City	181	(8)
2008–2009	→ Newport County (loan)	2	(0)
2009–2010	Eastleigh	20	(0)
2010–2013	Gosport Borough	107	(4)
2013–2015	Bemerton Heath Harlequins	78	(2)
- Moneyfields
- AFC Portchester

International career
2003–2011	Isle of Wight	9	(1)
- * Club domestic league appearances and goals

Aaron Cook (6 December 1979 – 4 June 2026) was a Welsh semi-professional footballer who played as a centre-back.

== Club career ==
Cook started his career at Portsmouth. He made one appearance, starting in a 1–0 home win over Stockport County on 17 February 1998, before he moved on loan to Crystal Palace.

In November 2008 he joined Newport County from Salisbury City initially on loan.

He was named in the Conference South All Stars team for the 2008–09 season, in June 2009, as voted for by the managers of Conference South teams.

In October 2009 he joined Eastleigh at a time for the Spitfires when Southampton were in negotiations with Eastleigh regarding Aaron Martin's move from the Silverlake Stadium (which went through in early November).

Cook made a positive start in his Eastleigh debut and helped the defence keep a clean sheet against Hampton & Richmond Borough on Tuesday 27 October 2009.

He joined Gosport Borough in July 2010, and was an ever-present in his first season as his new club finished 13th in the Southern League Division One South & West.

Cook also played for Moneyfields and AFC Portchester.

== International career ==
Cook was a member of the Isle of Wight national football team.

== Death ==
Cook died from oesophageal cancer on 4 June 2026, at the age of 46.
