= Steve Peplow =

English footballer (1949–2021)

Personal information
- Full name: Stephen Thomas Peplow
- Date of birth: 8 January 1949
- Place of birth: Liverpool, England
- Date of death: 29 December 2021 (aged 72)
- Height: 5 ft 8 in (1.73 m)
- Position: Right winger

Senior career*
Years	Team	Apps	(Gls)
1969–1970	Liverpool	2	(0)
1970–1973	Swindon Town	40	(11)
1973	Nottingham Forest	3	(0)
1973–1974	→ Mansfield Town (loan)	4	(3)
1973–1981	Tranmere Rovers	248	(44)
1976	Chicago Sting (loan)	20	(4)
Total		317	(62)
- * Club domestic league appearances and goals

Stephen Thomas Peplow (8 January 1949 – 29 December 2021) was an English footballer who played as a winger. He made 248 league appearances for Tranmere Rovers between 1973 and 1981.

Peplow married Mary in Birkenhead in 1995. His best-man was Scottish former professional footballer Barrie Mitchell, who provided him with a commissioned tape of the first ever Match of the Day to be televised in colour, on which Peplow appeared making his debut for Liverpool.

He died after a long illness on 29 December 2021, at the age of 72.

== Career statistics ==
Appearances and goals by club, season and competition
Club	Season	League			FA Cup		League Cup		Other		Total	
Club	Season	Division	Apps	Goals	Apps	Goals	Apps	Goals	Apps	Goals	Apps	Goals
Liverpool	1969–70	First Division	2	0	0	0	0	0	–		2	0
Swindon Town	1970–71	Second Division	11	4	0	0	0	0	4 (Note: Appearances in Anglo-Italian Cup)	2	15	6
Swindon Town	1971–72	Second Division	5	0	0	0	0	0	–		5	0
Swindon Town	1972–73	Second Division	24	7	0	0	1	0	–		25	7
Swindon Town	Total		40	11	0	0	1	0	4	2	45	13
Nottingham Forest	1973–74	Second Division	3	0	0	0	2	0	–		5	0
Mansfield Town (loan)	1973–74	Fourth Division	4	3	0	0	0	0	–		4	3
Tranmere Rovers	1973–74	Third Division	18	2	0	0	0	0	–		18	2
Tranmere Rovers	1974–75	Third Division	17	3	1	0	0	0	–		18	3
Tranmere Rovers	1975–76	Fourth Division	46	11	1	0	3	0	–		50	11
Tranmere Rovers	1976–77	Third Division	32	3	1	0	0	0	–		33	3
Tranmere Rovers	1977–78	Third Division	42	7	2	0	2	0	–		46	7
Tranmere Rovers	1978–79	Third Division	28	8	3	0	2	0	–		33	8
Tranmere Rovers	1979–80	Fourth Division	43	6	2	1	4	2	–		49	9
Tranmere Rovers	1980–81	Fourth Division	22	4	1	0	2	0	–		25	4
Tranmere Rovers	Total		248	44	11	1	13	2	0	0	272	46
Chicago Sting (loan)	1976	North American Soccer League	20	4	0	0	0	0	–		20	4
Career total			317	62	11	1	16	2	4	2	348	67
