= John Tones =

English footballer

Personal information
- Full name: John David Tones
- Date of birth: 3 December 1950 (age 75)
- Place of birth: Silksworth, England
- Position: Defender

Senior career*
Years	Team	Apps	(Gls)
1968–1973	Sunderland	6	(0)
1973–1974	Arsenal	0	(0)
1974	→ Swansea City (loan)	7	(0)
1974	→ Mansfield Town (loan)	3	(0)
- * Club domestic league appearances and goals

John David Tones (born 3 December 1950) is an English former professional footballer who played as a defender for Sunderland.
