= Roy Brown (footballer, born 1945) =

English footballer (born 1945)

Personal information
- Full name: Roy Eric Brown
- Date of birth: 5 October 1945 (age 81)
- Place of birth: Shoreham-by-Sea, England
- Position: Goalkeeper

Senior career*
Years	Team	Apps	(Gls)
1962–1968	Tottenham Hotspur	1	(0)
1968–1969	Reading	63	(0)
1970–1974	Notts County	113	(0)
1975	Mansfield Town	1	(0)
- * Club domestic league appearances and goals

Roy Ernest Eric Brown (born 5 October 1945) is an English former professional footballer who played for Tottenham Hotspur, Reading, Notts County and Mansfield Town.

== Playing career ==
Brown joined Tottenham Hotspur as an amateur in September 1961 and was signed professionally in October 1962. As goalkeeper he played one first team match in 1966 for the Spurs at White Hart Lane in a 3-1 reverse against Blackpool on 15 October 1966. However, Brown made 250 appearances at various levels in his time with the club. Brown signed for Reading in July 1968 and featured in 63 matches. In July 1970 he transferred to Notts County where he went on to make a further 113 appearances before joining Mansfield Town in November 1975 where he made one senior appearance.

== Post-football career ==
Brown held the position of Sports Centre manager in Newark-on-Trent, Watford and Reading before becoming Head of Leisure for Reading Borough Council, a post he held between 1975 and 1999. In addition he was secretary of the Reading Golf club and later held the same position at Ham Manor Golf Club, Angmering, Sussex.
