= Bill Grozier =

Scottish footballer

Personal information
- Full name: William Grozier
- Date of birth: 24 August 1956 (age 70)
- Place of birth: Cumnock, Scotland
- Position: Full back

Senior career*
Years	Team	Apps	(Gls)
1973–1974	Mansfield Town	1	(0)
1974	Boston United		
Total		1	(0)
- * Club domestic league appearances and goals

William Grozier (born 24 August 1956) is a Scottish former professional footballer who played in the Football League for Mansfield Town.
