= Trevor Hitchen =

English footballer (1926–2026)

Personal information
- Date of birth: 25 September 1926
- Place of birth: Sowerby Bridge, England
- Date of death: 15 June 2026 (aged 99)
- Position: Wing half

Youth career
- Halifax Town

Senior career*
Years	Team	Apps	(Gls)
1945–1946	Notts County		
1946–1949	Wellington Town		
1949–1956	Southport	242	(34)
1956–1957	Oldham Athletic	3	(0)
1957–1958	Wigan Athletic	37	(7)
1958–1959	Southport	5	(0)
- Formby

Managerial career
- 1957–1958: Wigan Athletic (player-manager)
- 1958–1959: Southport (player-manager)
- Formby (player-manager)
- * Club domestic league appearances and goals

Trevor Hitchen (25 September 1926 – 15 June 2026) was an English footballer who played as a wing half in The Football League for Southport and Oldham Athletic. He was also appointed player-manager at Wigan Athletic, scoring seven goals in 37 Lancashire Combination games during the 1957–58 season. He finished his career at Formby, where he later became chairman. In September 2019, on his 93rd birthday, it was announced that he would be inducted into the Southport F.C. Hall of Fame. Hitchen died on 15 June 2026, at the age of 99.
