= Paul Jones (footballer, born September 1953) =

English footballer

Personal information
- Full name: Paul Stanley Jones
- Date of birth: 10 September 1953 (age 73)
- Place of birth: Stockport, England
- Position: Midfielder

Senior career*
Years	Team	Apps	(Gls)
1972–1973	Manchester United	0	(0)
1973–1974	Mansfield Town	20	(1)
1974	→ Rochdale (loan)	0	(0)
1974	Chesterfield	0	(0)
1975	St George Sydney		
Total		20	(1)
- * Club domestic league appearances and goals

Paul Stanley Jones (born 10 September 1953) is an English former professional footballer who played in the Football League for Mansfield Town.
