= Bobby Harrison (footballer) =

English footballer (1930–2026)

Bobby Harrison (23 December 1930 – June 2026) was an English professional footballer who played as an outside right.

== Career ==
Harrison made 70 appearances for Carlisle United between 1952 and 1955. He also played for Margate between 1968 and 1969, as well as stints with Stockport County and Mossley A.F.C.

== Death ==
Harrison died in June 2026, aged 95.
