= Kevin Griffin (footballer) =

English footballer

Personal information
- Full name: Kevin Russell Griffin
- Date of birth: 5 October 1953 (age 73)
- Place of birth: Plymouth, England
- Position: Forward

Senior career*
Years	Team	Apps	(Gls)
1971–1975	Bristol City	8	(0)
1974–1975	→ Mansfield Town (loan)	4	(2)
1975–1976	→ Cambridge United (loan)	8	(1)
1976	Bath City		
Total		20	(3)
- * Club domestic league appearances and goals

Kevin Russell Griffin (born 5 October 1953) is an English former professional footballer who played in the Football League for Bristol City, Cambridge United, and Mansfield Town.
