= Noel O'Brien (English footballer) =

English footballer

Personal information
- Full name: Noel William O'Brien
- Date of birth: 18 December 1956 (age 69)
- Place of birth: Islington, England
- Position: Midfielder

Senior career*
Years	Team	Apps	(Gls)
1974–1975	Arsenal	0	(0)
1975–1976	Mansfield Town	7	(0)
1976	Wimbledon		
1976	Halifax Town	0	(0)
Total		7	(0)
- * Club domestic league appearances and goals

Noel William O'Brien (born 18 December 1956) is an English former professional footballer who played in the Football League for Mansfield Town.
