= Gordon Hodgson (footballer, born 1952) =

English footballer

Personal information
- Full name: Gordon Henry Hodgson
- Date of birth: 13 October 1952
- Place of birth: Newcastle upon Tyne, England
- Date of death: April 1999 (aged 46)
- Place of death: Peterborough, England
- Position: Midfielder

Senior career*
Years	Team	Apps	(Gls)
1971–1974	Newcastle United	9	(0)
1974–1978	Mansfield Town	184	(23)
1978–1980	Oxford United	67	(3)
1980–1982	Peterborough United	83	(5)
Total		343	(31)

International career
1971	England Youth	3	(1)
- * Club domestic league appearances and goals

Gordon Hodgson (13 October 1952 – April 1999) was an English footballer.

A central midfielder, Hodgson began his career at his hometown club Newcastle United but found his chances limited. He moved to Mansfield Town in 1974 became a central figure in the side, winning promotion to the Second Division in 1977. He later played for Oxford United and Peterborough United.

Hodgson died in early April 1999, aged just 46. A minute's silence in his memory was held at Field Mill before the match between Mansfield and Southend United on 10 April 1999.
