= Ray Clarke (English footballer) =

English footballer (born 1952)

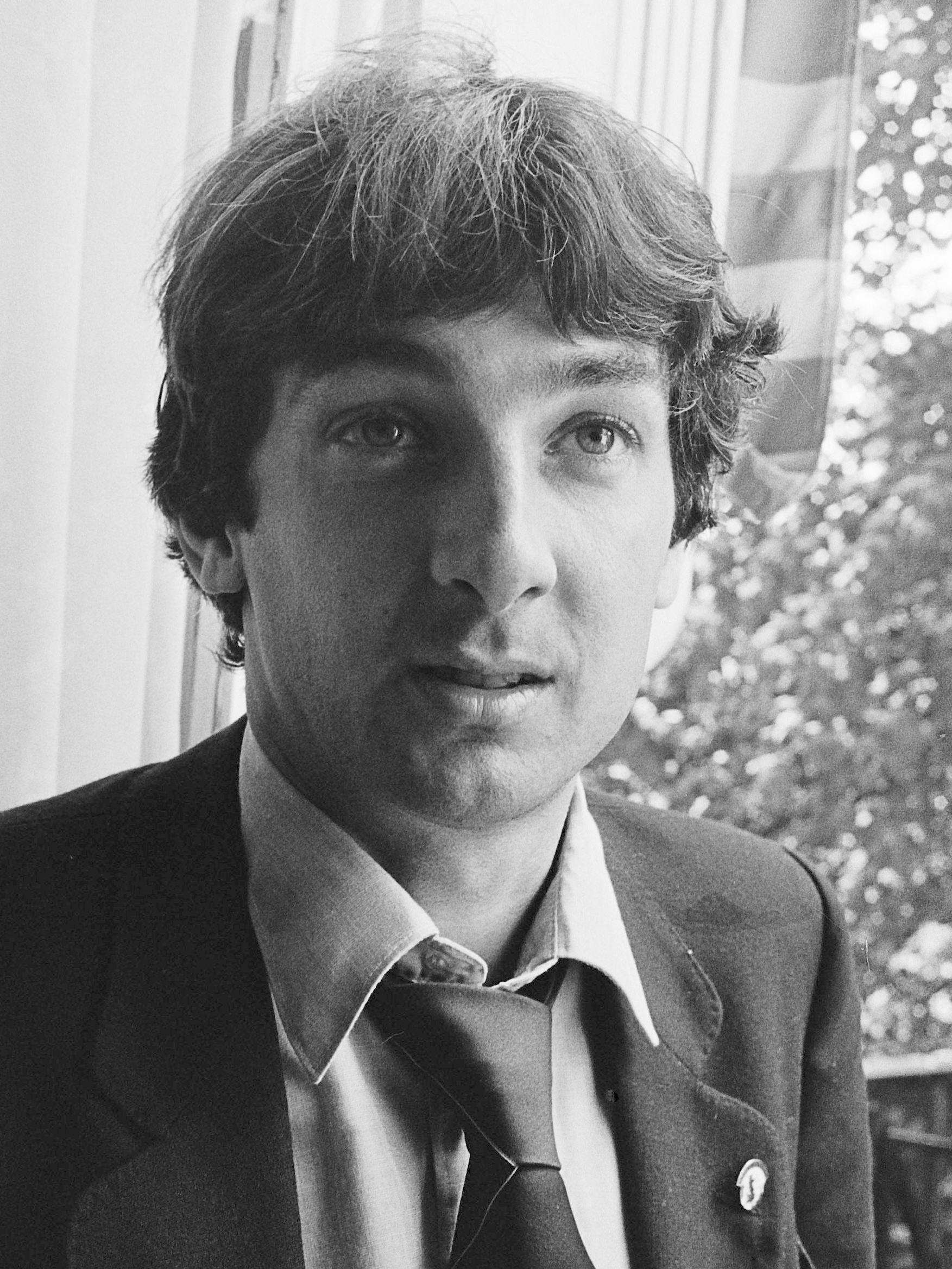
- Clarke at townhall Amsterdam, in June 1979 (Dutch champion and Dutch Cup winner)

Personal information
- Date of birth: 25 September 1952 (age 74)
- Place of birth: Hackney, England
- Position: Striker

Team information
- Current team: Blackburn Rovers (head scout)

Youth career
- Tottenham Hotspur

Senior career*
Years	Team	Apps	(Gls)
1972–1973	Tottenham Hotspur	1	(0)
1973–1974	Swindon Town	14	(2)
1974–1976	Mansfield Town	91	(52)
1976–1978	Sparta Rotterdam	65	(35)
1978–1979	Ajax	31	(26)
1979	Club Brugge	8	(3)
1979–1980	Brighton & Hove Albion	30	(8)
1980–1981	Newcastle United	14	(2)
- * Club domestic league appearances and goals

Ray Clarke (born 25 September 1952) is an English retired professional footballer who played in England for Tottenham Hotspur, Swindon Town, Mansfield Town, Brighton & Hove Albion and Newcastle United, in the Netherlands for Sparta Rotterdam and Ajax Amsterdam, and in Belgium for Club Brugge.

Clarke was chief international scout for Scottish side Celtic. Clarke left the position in June 2009.

Clarke was appointed chief scout of Portsmouth in September 2009.

By September 2010, Clarke was working as a scout at Middlesbrough, renewing his ties with Gordon Strachan who was his boss during his time at Celtic.

On 7 September 2012, he was appointed Head Scout at Blackburn Rovers.

== Honors ==
Ajax

- Eredivisie: 1978–79
- KNVB Cup: 1978–79
