= Lawrie Madden =

English footballer

Personal information
- Full name: Lawrence David Madden
- Date of birth: 28 September 1955 (age 71)
- Place of birth: Hackney, England
- Height: 5 ft 11 in (1.80 m)
- Position: Defender

Youth career
- Arsenal

Senior career*
| Years | Team | Apps | (Gls) |
| 1975 | Mansfield Town (as amateur) | 10 | (0) |
| 1975–1977 | Boston United | 47 | (0) |
| 1978–1982 | Charlton Athletic | 113 | (7) |
| 1982–1983 | Millwall | 47 | (2) |
| 1983–1991 | Sheffield Wednesday | 212 | (2) |
| 1991 | →Leicester City (loan) | 3 | (0) |
| 1991–1993 | Wolverhampton Wanderers | 67 | (1) |
| 1993 | Darlington | 5 | (0) |
| 1993–1996 | Chesterfield | 37 | (1) |
- * Club domestic league appearances and goals

Lawrie Madden (born 28 September 1955) is an English former professional footballer, who played in The Football League for nine different clubs between the 1970s and 1990s. He was a member of the Sheffield Wednesday side that won the 1991 League Cup.

His final league side was Chesterfield, who he joined in October 1993 and left towards the end of the 1995–1996 season. His final League match was for Chesterfield at Oxford United, on 12 August 1995.

== Honours ==
Millwall

- Football League Group Cup: 1982–83

Sheffield Wednesday

- Football League Cup: 1990–91
