= Jim McCaffrey (footballer) =

English footballer

Personal information
- Full name: James McCaffrey
- Date of birth: 12 October 1951 (age 75)
- Place of birth: Luton, England
- Height: 5 ft 7 in (1.70 m)
- Position: Midfielder

Senior career*
Years	Team	Apps	(Gls)
1969–1970	Nottingham Forest	8	(1)
1972–1976	Mansfield Town	178	(21)
1976–1978	Huddersfield Town	27	(0)
1978–1979	Portsmouth	12	(1)
1979–1980	Northampton Town	57	(6)
Total		282	(29)
- * Club domestic league appearances and goals

James McCaffrey (born 12 October 1951 in Luton) is a former professional footballer, who played for Nottingham Forest, Mansfield Town, Huddersfield Town, Portsmouth and Northampton Town.
