= John Lathan =

English footballer

Personal information
- Full name: John George Lathan
- Date of birth: 12 April 1952 (age 74)
- Place of birth: Sunderland, England
- Height: 5 ft 7 in (1.70 m)
- Position: Midfielder

Senior career*
Years	Team	Apps	(Gls)
1969–1974	Sunderland	53	(14)
1974–1976	Mansfield Town	74	(14)
1976–1978	Carlisle United	61	(8)
1977	→ Barnsley (loan)	7	(0)
1978–1979	Portsmouth	58	(4)
1979–1980	Mansfield Town	29	(1)
1980–1981	Consett		
1981–1982	Wollongong City		
1982–1983	Arcadia Shepherds		
1983–198?	Mamelodi Sundowns		
- * Club domestic league appearances and goals

John George Lathan (born 12 April 1952) is an English former professional footballer who played as a midfielder for Sunderland.

He was part of the Mansfield Town team that won the Fourth Division in the 1974–75 season.
