= Terry Eccles =

English footballer

Personal information
- Full name: Terence Stuart Eccles
- Date of birth: 2 March 1952 (age 74)
- Place of birth: Leeds, England
- Height: 6 ft 1/2 in (1.84 m)
- Position: Striker

Youth career
- Blackburn Rovers

Senior career*
Years	Team	Apps	(Gls)
1969–1973	Blackburn Rovers	46	(6)
1973–1976	Mansfield Town	118	(47)
1976–1978	Huddersfield Town	46	(6)
1978–1979	Ethnikos Piraeus	29	(3)
1979–1981	York City	64	(18)
1981–1982	Scarborough	15	(7)
- * Club domestic league appearances and goals

Terence Stuart Eccles (born 2 March 1952, in Leeds) is an English former footballer who played 274 games and scored 77 goals in the Football League playing as a striker for Blackburn Rovers, Mansfield Town, Huddersfield Town and York City. He also had a short stint with the Greek club Ethnikos Piraeus and played in the Conference National for Scarborough.
