= Paul Matthews (footballer) =

English footballer (1946–2026)

Personal information
- Full name: Paul William Matthews
- Date of birth: 30 September 1946
- Place of birth: Leicester, England
- Date of death: 3 September 2026 (aged 79)
- Position: Midfielder

Senior career*
Years	Team	Apps	(Gls)
1964–1972	Leicester City	61	(5)
1972	→ Southend United (loan)	1	(0)
1972–1977	Mansfield Town	124	(6)
1977–1978	Rotherham United	8	(0)
1978–1979	→ Northampton Town (loan)	13	(0)
1979–1980	Enderby Town		
1980–1981	Heanor Town		
1981–1982	Oadby Town		
Total		207	(11)
- * Club domestic league appearances and goals

Paul William Matthews (30 September 1946 – 3 September 2026) was an English professional footballer who played as a midfielder in the Football League for Leicester City, Mansfield Town, Northampton Town, Rotherham United and Southend United. He died on 3 September 2026, aged 79.
