= 1982–83 Mansfield Town F.C. season =

Mansfield Town
1982–83 season
- Manager: Stuart Boam; Ian Greaves
- Stadium: Field Mill
- Fourth Division: 10th
- FA Cup: Second Round
- League Cup: First Round
- Group Cup: Group Stage

The 1982–83 season was Mansfield Town's 46th season in the Football League and 9th in the Fourth Division they finished in 10th position with 61 points.

== Final league table ==
Pos	Team	Pld	W	D	L	GF	GA	GD	Pts
8	Swindon Town	46	19	11	16	61	54	+7	68
9	Peterborough United	46	17	13	16	58	52	+6	64
10	Mansfield Town	46	16	13	17	61	70	−9	61
11	Halifax Town	46	16	12	18	59	66	−7	60
12	Torquay United	46	17	7	22	56	65	−9	58

== Results ==
=== Football League Fourth Division ===
Match	Date	Opponent	Venue	Result	Attendance	Scorers
1	28 August 1982	Blackpool	H	2–1	2,627	Dungworth, Waddle
2	3 September 1982	Halifax Town	A	0–0	2,225	
3	6 September 1982	Tranmere Rovers	A	0–3	1,280	
4	11 September 1982	Port Vale	H	0–2	2,316	
5	18 September 1982	Hereford United	A	2–0	1,960	Nicholson (2)
6	25 September 1982	Rochdale	H	2–1	2,002	Waddle (2)
7	27 September 1982	Peterborough United	H	0–0	2,414	
8	1 October 1982	Crewe Alexandra	A	2–1	1,787	Waddle, Day
9	9 October 1982	Bury	H	1–4	2,415	Bell
10	16 October 1982	Chester	A	3–1	1,817	Caldwell (2), Woodhead
11	18 October 1982	Scunthorpe United	H	0–2	2,647	
12	23 October 1982	Swindon Town	A	0–4	4,092	
13	30 October 1982	Darlington	H	0–2	1,817	
14	3 November 1982	Hartlepool United	A	4–0	1,325	Caldwell, Nicholson, Woodhead, Ayre
15	5 November 1982	Colchester United	A	0–2	2,009	
16	13 November 1982	Bristol City	H	1–1	2,035	Newman (o.g.)
17	27 November 1982	York City	A	1–6	2,119	Nicholson
18	4 December 1982	Stockport County	H	1–0	1,662	Bell
19	17 December 1982	Torquay United	H	2–1	1,293	Caldwell, Dungworth
20	27 December 1982	Wimbledon	A	1–1	2,512	Caldwell
21	28 December 1982	Northampton Town	H	2–0	2,843	Caldwell, Matthews
22	1 January 1983	Aldershot	A	1–2	2,235	Ayre
23	3 January 1983	Hull City	H	3–1	4,517	Dungworth (2), Nicholson
24	8 January 1983	Halifax Town	H	1–2	2,401	Dungworth
25	15 January 1983	Blackpool	A	1–2	2,217	Nicholson
26	22 January 1983	Hereford United	A	0–1	1,728	
27	29 January 1983	Port Vale	A	1–4	4,102	Hutchinson
28	5 February 1983	Rochdale	A	2–2	1,031	Dungworth, Matthews
29	19 February 1983	Bury	A	0–1	2,403	
30	26 February 1983	Chester	H	2–1	1,805	Matthews, Hutchinson
31	1 March 1983	Scunthorpe United	A	2–2	3,562	Bell, Bird
32	5 March 1983	Swindon Town	H	1–0	2,102	Dungworth
33	12 March 1983	Darlington	A	0–0	952	
34	14 March 1983	Hartlepool United	H	3–0	1,991	Dungworth (3)
35	19 March 1983	Colchester United	H	1–1	2,373	Nicholson
36	26 March 1983	Bristol City	A	1–3	4,952	Caldwell
37	28 March 1983	Crewe Alexandra	H	1–0	2,247	Caldwell
38	2 April 1983	Northampton Town	A	2–1	1,988	Caldwell (2)
39	5 April 1983	Wimbledon	H	2–2	3,530	Dungworth (2)
40	8 April 1983	Stockport County	A	1–1	2,202	Dungworth
41	16 April 1983	Tranmere Rovers	H	1–1	2,469	Bell
42	23 April 1983	Torquay United	A	3–1	1,447	Ayre
43	30 April 1983	York City	H	2–2	2,288	Dungworth, Caldwell
44	2 May 1983	Hull City	A	2–2	7,875	Bell (2)
45	7 May 1983	Peterborough United	A	2–3	2,200	Bird, Thorpe
46	14 May 1983	Aldershot	H	4–1	1,788	Kearney, Bell, Hutchinson, Woodhead

=== FA Cup ===
Round	Date	Opponent	Venue	Result	Attendance	Scorers
R1	20 November 1982	Stockport County	H	3–2	2,215	Bell, Dungworth (2)
R2	11 December 1982	Bradford City	H	1–1	2,962	Dungworth
R2 Replay	25 December 1982	Bradford City	A	2–3	3,081	Bell, Dungworth

=== League Cup ===
Round	Date	Opponent	Venue	Result	Attendance	Scorers
R1 1st leg	1 September 1982	Bradford City	A	0–1	3,265	
R1 2nd leg	13 September 1982	Bradford City	H	0–2	2,260	

=== Group Cup ===
Round	Date	Opponent	Venue	Result	Attendance	Scorers
Group Stage	14 August 1982	Peterborough United	A	1–4	1,855	Bird
Group Stage	16 August 1982	Northampton Town	H	1–2	1,485	Ayre
Group Stage	21 August 1982	Norwich City	H	1–3	1,985	Dungworth

== Squad statistics ==
- Squad list sourced from 1982–83 Mansfield Town F.C. season at the English National Football Archive (subscription required)

Pos.	Name	League		FA Cup		League Cup		Group Cup		Total	
Pos.	Name	Apps	Goals	Apps	Goals	Apps	Goals	Apps	Goals	Apps	Goals
GK	(England) Rod Arnold	43	0	3	0	2	0	3	0	51	0
GK	(England) David Coles	3	0	0	0	0	0	0	0	3	0
DF	(England) Billy Ayre	42	3	3	0	2	0	2	1	49	4
DF	(England) Kevin Bird	28(1)	2	2	0	2	0	3	1	35(1)	3
DF	(England) Ray Blackhall	15	0	1	0	0	0	0	0	16	0
DF	(England) Stuart Boam	7	0	0	0	0	0	2	0	9	0
DF	(England) Colin Calderwood	28	0	3	0	0	0	1	0	32	0
DF	(England) Clive Day	10(2)	1	0	0	2	0	0	0	12(2)	1
DF	(England) Keith Kennedy	32(2)	0	3	0	2	0	3	0	40(2)	0
DF	(England) Mark Reynolds	4	0	0	0	0	0	0	0	4	0
DF	(England) Simon Woodhead	35(7)	3	0(1)	0	1	0	1	0	37(8)	3
MF	(England) Charlie Bell	37(2)	7	3	2	1	0	3	0	44(2)	9
MF	(England) Barry Gallagher	2(1)	0	0	0	0	0	0	0	2(1)	0
MF	(England) Bobby Hutchinson	25	3	3	0	0	0	0	0	28	3
MF	(England) Mark Kearney	11	1	0	0	0	0	0	0	11	1
MF	(England) Joe Laidlaw	4	0	0	0	2	0	3	0	9	0
MF	(England) Jon Laws	0(1)	0	0	0	0	0	0	0	0(1)	0
MF	(England) Tony Lowery	1	0	0	0	0	0	0	0	1	0
MF	(England) John Matthews	39(1)	3	3	0	2	0	3	0	47(1)	3
MF	(England) Mark Rhodes	4	0	0	0	0	0	0	0	4	0
MF	(England) Mark Sindall	9(2)	0	0	0	0	0	0	0	9(2)	0
FW	(Scotland) David Caldwell	34(1)	10	3	0	1	0	2(1)	0	40(2)	10
FW	(England) Paul Cannell	6(1)	0	0	0	1	0	1	0	8(1)	0
FW	(England) John Dungworth	36(3)	14	3	4	2	0	3	1	44(3)	19
FW	(England) Gary Nicholson	37(2)	8	3	0	1	0	1	0	42(2)	8
FW	(England) Aidey Thorpe	0(2)	1	0	0	0	0	0	0	0(2)	1
FW	(England) Alan Waddle	14	4	0	0	1	0	2(1)	0	17(1)	4
–	Own goals	–	1	–	0	–	0	–	0	–	1
