= 1981–82 Mansfield Town F.C. season =

Mansfield Town
1981–82 season
- Manager: Stuart Boam
- Stadium: Field Mill
- Fourth Division: 20th
- FA Cup: First Round
- League Cup: Second Round

The 1981–82 season was Mansfield Town's 45th season in the Football League and 8th in the Fourth Division they finished in 20th position with 49 points.

== Final league table ==
| Pos | Team | Pld | W | D | L | GF | GA | GD | Pts | Promotion |
|---|---|---|---|---|---|---|---|---|---|---|
| 18 | Stockport County | 46 | 12 | 13 | 21 | 48 | 67 | −19 | 49 | |
| 19 | Halifax Town | 46 | 9 | 22 | 15 | 51 | 72 | −21 | 49 | |
| 20 | Mansfield Town | 46 | 13 | 10 | 23 | 63 | 81 | −18 | 47 (Note: Mansfield Town had 2 points deducted.) | |
| 21 | Rochdale | 46 | 10 | 16 | 20 | 50 | 62 | −12 | 46 | Re-elected |
| 22 | Northampton Town | 46 | 11 | 9 | 26 | 57 | 84 | −27 | 42 | Re-elected |

== Results ==
=== Football League Fourth Division ===
| Match | Date | Opponent | Venue | Result | Attendance | Scorers |
|---|---|---|---|---|---|---|
| 1 | 29 August 1981 | Peterborough United | A | 0–1 | 4,310 | |
| 2 | 5 September 1981 | Bournemouth | H | 0–1 | 2,950 | |
| 3 | 12 September 1981 | Port Vale | A | 0–0 | 3,043 | |
| 4 | 19 September 1981 | Bury | H | 1–1 | 2,501 | Lumby |
| 5 | 21 September 1981 | Northampton Town | H | 4–1 | 2,612 | Lumby, Nicholson, Burrows, Mann |
| 6 | 26 September 1981 | Aldershot | A | 3–2 | 2,486 | Lumby, Burrows, Boam |
| 7 | 30 September 1981 | Torquay United | A | 0–2 | 3,227 | |
| 8 | 3 October 1981 | Blackpool | H | 2–2 | 3,466 | Caldwell, Bird |
| 9 | 10 October 1981 | Hull City | H | 3–3 | 3,464 | Caldwell, Lumby (2) |
| 10 | 17 October 1981 | Darlington | A | 0–1 | 1,576 | |
| 11 | 20 October 1981 | Sheffield United | A | 1–4 | 12,727 | Caldwell |
| 12 | 24 October 1981 | Crewe Alexandra | H | 0–1 | 2,513 | |
| 13 | 30 October 1981 | Stockport County | A | 0–3 | 2,081 | |
| 14 | 2 November 1981 | Colchester United | H | 1–3 | 2,294 | Morgan |
| 15 | 7 November 1981 | Halifax Town | A | 1–2 | 1,447 | Caldwell |
| 16 | 14 November 1981 | Rochdale | H | 4–3 | 2,300 | Parkinson, Morgan, Bell (2) |
| 17 | 28 November 1981 | Hereford United | H | 2–1 | 1,898 | Lumby, Wood |
| 18 | 5 December 1981 | Tranmere Rovers | A | 2–2 | 1,416 | Morgan (2) |
| 19 | 2 January 1982 | Wigan Athletic | H | 1–2 | 2,173 | Wood |
| 20 | 16 January 1982 | Hartlepool United | H | 3–2 | 2,011 | Caldwell, Parkinson, Morgan |
| 21 | 20 January 1982 | Bradford City | A | 4–3 | 3,739 | Parkinson, Morgan, Lumby (2) |
| 22 | 23 January 1982 | Peterborough United | A | 1–2 | 3,242 | Parkinson |
| 23 | 30 January 1982 | Bury | A | 2–3 | 2,942 | Lumby, Bell |
| 24 | 2 February 1982 | Scunthorpe United | A | 0–1 | 2,172 | |
| 25 | 6 February 1982 | Port Vale | H | 1–3 | 2,690 | Bell |
| 26 | 9 February 1982 | Northampton Town | A | 1–1 | 1,945 | Lumby |
| 27 | 13 February 1982 | Blackpool | A | 3–2 | 3,017 | Lumby, Parkinson, Cannell |
| 28 | 20 February 1982 | Aldershot | H | 1–0 | 2,001 | Parkinson |
| 29 | 23 February 1982 | Bournemouth | A | 0–1 | 5,752 | |
| 30 | 27 February 1982 | Hull City | A | 0–2 | 5,220 | |
| 31 | 6 March 1982 | Darlington | H | 2–3 | 1,538 | Lumby, Nicholson |
| 32 | 8 March 1982 | Sheffield United | H | 1–1 | 8,944 | Wood |
| 33 | 13 March 1982 | Crewe Alexandra | A | 2–0 | 1,476 | Cannell, Bell |
| 34 | 16 March 1982 | Colchester United | A | 1–0 | 2,000 | Lumby |
| 35 | 20 March 1982 | Stockport County | H | 2–2 | 2,161 | Lumby, Parkinson |
| 36 | 27 March 1982 | Halifax Town | H | 3–2 | 2,199 | Cannell, Caldwell (2) |
| 37 | 3 April 1982 | Rochdale | A | 1–1 | 1,276 | Parkinson |
| 38 | 5 April 1982 | York City | H | 0–2 | 2,388 | |
| 39 | 10 April 1982 | York City | A | 1–2 | 2,155 | Wood |
| 40 | 13 April 1982 | Scunthorpe United | H | 1–1 | 2,204 | Caldwell |
| 41 | 17 April 1982 | Tranmere Rovers | H | 3–0 | 1,697 | Bird, Nicholson, Parkinson |
| 42 | 24 April 1982 | Hereford United | A | 1–3 | 2,852 | Cannell |
| 43 | 1 May 1982 | Torquay United | H | 3–1 | 1,394 | Caldwell, Nicholson, Bell |
| 44 | 5 May 1982 | Hartlepool United | A | 0–3 | 1,202 | |
| 45 | 8 May 1982 | Wigan Athletic | A | 1–3 | 7,517 | Burrows |
| 46 | 15 May 1982 | Bradford City | H | 0–2 | 3,109 | |

=== FA Cup ===
| Round | Date | Opponent | Venue | Result | Attendance | Scorers |
|---|---|---|---|---|---|---|
| R1 | 21 November 1981 | Doncaster Rovers | H | 0–1 | 5,456 | |

=== League Cup ===
| Round | Date | Opponent | Venue | Result | Attendance | Scorers |
|---|---|---|---|---|---|---|
| R1 1st leg | 1 September 1981 | Scunthorpe United | A | 0–0 | 2,249 | |
| R1 2nd leg | 14 September 1981 | Scunthorpe United | H | 2–0 | 2,258 | Lumby (2) |
| R2 1st leg | 7 October 1981 | Bradford City | A | 4–3 | 4,293 | Bird, Lumby, Wood, Smith (o.g) |
| R2 2nd leg | 26 October 1981 | Bradford City | A | 0–2 | 3,522 | |

== Squad statistics ==
- Squad list sourced from 1981–82 Mansfield Town F.C. season at the English National Football Archive (subscription required)

| Pos. | Name | League | | FA Cup | | League Cup | | Total | |
| Pos. | Name | Apps | Goals | Apps | Goals | Apps | Goals | Apps | Goals |
|---|---|---|---|---|---|---|---|---|---|
| GK | (England) Rod Arnold | 45 | 0 | 1 | 0 | 4 | 0 | 50 | 0 |
| GK | (England) Graham Brown | 1 | 0 | 0 | 0 | 0 | 0 | 1 | 0 |
| DF | (England) Kevin Bird | 25(1) | 2 | 0 | 0 | 4 | 1 | 29(1) | 3 |
| DF | (England) Stuart Boam | 4(4) | 1 | 0 | 0 | 2 | 0 | 6(4) | 1 |
| DF | (England) Adrian Burrows | 41 | 3 | 1 | 0 | 2 | 0 | 44 | 3 |
| DF | (England) Colin Calderwood | 1 | 0 | 0 | 0 | 0 | 0 | 1 | 0 |
| DF | (England) Barry Foster | 28 | 0 | 1 | 0 | 1 | 0 | 30 | 0 |
| DF | (Scotland) Les McJannet | 37(1) | 0 | 1 | 0 | 4 | 0 | 42(1) | 0 |
| DF | (England) Ian Wood | 36 | 4 | 1 | 0 | 3(1) | 1 | 40(1) | 5 |
| DF | (England) Simon Woodhead | 11(1) | 0 | 0 | 0 | 0(1) | 0 | 11(2) | 0 |
| MF | (England) Charlie Bell | 45 | 5 | 1 | 0 | 4 | 0 | 50 | 5 |
| MF | (Scotland) Arthur Mann | 35(2) | 1 | 1 | 0 | 3(1) | 0 | 39(3) | 1 |
| MF | (England) Noel Parkinson | 31(4) | 9 | 1 | 0 | 1(1) | 0 | 33(5) | 9 |
| FW | (Scotland) David Caldwell | 31(2) | 9 | 1 | 0 | 4 | 0 | 36(2) | 9 |
| FW | (England) Paul Cannell | 23 | 4 | 0 | 0 | 0 | 0 | 23 | 4 |
| FW | (England) Jim Lumby | 38(1) | 14 | 0 | 0 | 4 | 3 | 42(1) | 17 |
| FW | (England) Trevor Morgan | 12 | 6 | 1 | 0 | 0 | 0 | 13 | 6 |
| FW | (England) Gary Nicholson | 37(1) | 5 | 0(1) | 0 | 4 | 0 | 41(2) | 5 |
| FW | (Scotland) Brian Thomson | 25(4) | 0 | 1 | 0 | 4 | 0 | 30(4) | 0 |
| – | Own goals | – | 0 | – | 0 | – | 1 | – | 1 |
