= 1983–84 Mansfield Town F.C. season =

Mansfield Town
1983–84 season
- Manager: Ian Greaves
- Stadium: Field Mill
- Fourth Division: 19th
- FA Cup: Second round
- League Cup: First round
- Football League Trophy: First round

The 1983–84 season was Mansfield Town's 47th season in the Football League and 10th in the Fourth Division. They finished in 19th position with 52 points.

== Final league table ==
Pos	Team	Pld	W	D	L	GF	GA	GD	Pts	Promotion or qualification
17	Swindon Town	46	15	13	18	58	56	+2	58	
18	Northampton Town	46	13	14	19	53	78	−25	53	
19	Mansfield Town	46	13	13	20	66	70	−4	52	
20	Wrexham	46	11	15	20	59	74	−15	48	Qualification for the European Cup Winners' Cup first round (Note: Wrexham lost the Welsh Cup final to Shrewsbury Town, but since Shrewsbury are an English side, Wrexham went on to represent Wales in the European Cup Winners' Cup.)
21	Halifax Town	46	12	12	22	55	89	−34	48	Re-elected

== Results ==
=== Football League Fourth Division ===
Match	Date	Opponent	Venue	Result	Attendance	Scorers
1	27 August 1983	Bristol City	A	0–4	5,759	
2	3 September 1983	Doncaster Rovers	H	1–2	2,962	Lister (o.g.)
3	6 September 1983	Stockport County	H	1–2	2,167	Thorpe (o.g.)
4	9 September 1983	Halifax Town	A	0–0	1,725	
5	17 September 1983	Tranmere Rovers	H	1–0	2,002	Nicholson
6	24 September 1983	Peterborough United	A	0–3	3,490	
7	27 September 1983	Blackpool	A	0–2	3,461	
8	1 October 1983	Aldershot	H	5–2	1,774	Caldwell (3), Lowery, Barrowclough
9	8 October 1983	Bury	A	2–2	2,468	Caldwell, Barrowclough
10	15 October 1983	Torquay United	A	1–3	1,940	Lowery
11	19 October 1983	Reading	A	0–4	3,781	
12	22 October 1983	Hartlepool United	H	5–0	1,906	Caldwell (4), Lowery
13	29 October 1983	Hereford United	A	0–0	3,422	
14	1 November 1983	Rochdale	H	3–0	2,536	Caldwell (2), Dungworth
15	5 November 1983	Wrexham	A	3–2	1,633	Nicholson (2), Keegan
16	12 November 1983	Colchester United	H	0–0	3,042	
17	26 November 1983	Swindon Town	H	2–2	3,328	Nicholson, Dungworth
18	3 December 1983	Darlington	A	0–3	1,630	
19	18 December 1983	Northampton Town	A	1–2	2,628	Lowery
20	26 December 1983	Chesterfield	H	0–1	6,734	
21	27 December 1983	Chester City	A	4–0	1,567	Barrowclough, Lowery, Caldwell, Nicholson
22	31 December 1983	Crewe Alexandra	H	3–3	2,625	Woodhead, Kearney, Caldwell
23	2 January 1984	York City	A	1–2	5,628	Barrowclough
24	7 January 1984	Doncaster Rovers	A	1–3	3,804	Kearney
25	30 January 1984	Tranmere Rovers	A	0–1	1,483	
26	4 February 1984	Aldershot	A	1–7	1,629	Barrowclough
27	11 February 1984	Peterborough United	H	0–0	2,179	
28	14 February 1984	Rochdale	A	0–0	1,095	
29	18 February 1984	Hereford United	H	1–1	1,868	Barrowclough
30	25 February 1984	Hartlepool United	A	1–4	1,730	Ayre
31	3 March 1984	Reading	H	2–0	1,950	Barrowclough, Nicholson
32	6 March 1984	Wrexham	H	3–4	1,986	Ayre (2), Caldwell
33	10 March 1984	Colchester United	A	0–1	2,007	
34	17 March 1984	Bury	H	1–1	1,673	Ayre
35	24 March 1984	Torquay United	A	0–1	1,559	
36	27 March 1984	Bristol City	H	0–1	1,828	
37	31 March 1984	Blackpool	H	1–1	1,993	Juryeff
38	6 April 1984	Stockport County	A	4–0	1,973	Juryeff, Caldwell, Barrowclough, Matthews
39	10 April 1984	Halifax Town	H	7–1	1,696	Juryeff (3), Caldwell, Barrowclough, Matthews, Lowery
40	14 April 1984	Darlington	H	1–0	2,075	Caldwell
41	21 April 1984	Chesterfield	A	0–0	4,364	
42	24 April 1984	Chester City	H	3–1	2,346	Matthews, Barrowclough, Nicholson
43	29 April 1984	Swindon Town	A	1–1	2,136	Nicholson
44	5 May 1984	York City	H	0–1	3,345	
45	7 May 1984	Crewe Alexandra	A	3–1	1,810	Caldwell (3)
46	12 May 1984	Northampton Town	H	3–1	2,143	Caldwell (2), Calderwood

=== FA Cup ===
Round	Date	Opponent	Venue	Result	Attendance	Scorers
R1	19 November 1983	Doncaster Rovers	H	3–0	5,027	Caldwell, Barrowclough, Calderwood
R2	10 December 1983	Bolton Wanderers	A	0–2	6,934	

=== League Cup ===
Round	Date	Opponent	Venue	Result	Attendance	Scorers
R1 1st leg	30 August 1983	Huddersfield Town	H	1–2	3,743	Barrowclough
R1 2nd leg	13 September 1983	Huddersfield Town	A	1–5	5,190	Caldwell

=== League Trophy ===
Round	Date	Opponent	Venue	Result	Attendance	Scorers
R1	21 February 1983	Darlington	H	1–3	1,086	Barrowclough

== Squad statistics ==
- Squad list sourced from 1983–84 Mansfield Town F.C. season at the English National Football Archive (subscription required)

Pos.	Name	League		FA Cup		League Cup		League Trophy		Total	
Pos.	Name	Apps	Goals	Apps	Goals	Apps	Goals	Apps	Goals	Apps	Goals
GK	(England) Rod Arnold	11	0	0	0	2	0	0	0	13	0
GK	(England) Barry Daines	21	0	2	0	0	0	1	0	24	0
GK	(England) Kevin Hitchcock	14	0	0	0	0	0	0	0	14	0
DF	(England) Billy Ayre	25	4	0	0	0	0	1	0	26	4
DF	(England) Colin Calderwood	27(3)	1	1	1	2	0	1	0	31(3)	2
DF	(England) George Foster	42	0	2	0	2	0	1	0	47	0
DF	(England) Mike Galloway	12(5)	0	1	0	0	0	1	0	14(5)	0
DF	(Scotland) Paul Taylor	3	0	0	0	0	0	0	0	3	0
DF	(England) Steve Whitworth	41	0	2	0	2	0	1	0	46	0
DF	(England) Simon Woodhead	41(2)	1	2	0	1	0	1	0	45(2)	1
MF	(England) Bobby Hutchinson	10	0	0	0	2	0	0	0	12	0
MF	(England) Mark Kearney	17	2	0(1)	0	2	0	0	0	19(1)	2
MF	(England) Ged Keegan	18	1	2	0	0	0	0	0	20	1
MF	(England) Tony Lowery	45	6	2	0	2	0	1	0	50	6
MF	(England) John Matthews	31(1)	3	2	0	1	0	1	0	35(1)	3
MF	(England) Mark Sindall	9(1)	0	0	0	1	0	0	0	10(1)	0
FW	(England) Stewart Barrowclough	36(2)	10	2	1	1	1	1	1	40(2)	13
FW	(Scotland) David Caldwell	37(1)	21	2	1	2	1	0(1)	0	41(2)	23
FW	(England) John Dungworth	14(3)	2	0	0	1	0	0	0	15(3)	2
FW	(England) Peter Frain	1(1)	0	0	0	0	0	0	0	1(1)	0
FW	(England) Ian Juryeff	12	5	0	0	0	0	0	0	12	5
FW	(England) Paul Kee	0(1)	0	0	0	0	0	0	0	0(1)	0
FW	(England) Gary Nicholson	38(3)	8	2	0	1	0	1	0	42(3)	8
FW	(England) John Partridge	1	0	0	0	0	0	0	0	1	0
FW	(England) Stuart Storer	0(1)	0	0	0	0	0	0	0	0(1)	0
–	Own goals	–	2	–	0	–	0	–	0	–	2
