= 1984–85 Mansfield Town F.C. season =

Mansfield Town
1984–85 season
- Manager: Ian Greaves
- Stadium: Field Mill
- Fourth Division: 14th
- FA Cup: Second Round
- League Cup: First Round
- Football League Trophy: Northern Final

The 1984–85 season was Mansfield Town's 48th season in the Football League and 11th in the Fourth Division they finished in 14th position with 57 points.

== Final league table ==
Pos	Team	Pld	W	D	L	GF	GA	GD	Pts
12	Port Vale	46	14	18	14	61	59	+2	60
13	Aldershot	46	17	8	21	56	63	−7	59
14	Mansfield Town	46	13	18	15	41	38	+3	57
15	Wrexham	46	15	9	22	67	70	−3	54
16	Chester City	46	15	9	22	60	72	−12	54

== Results ==
=== Football League Fourth Division ===
Match	Date	Opponent	Venue	Result	Attendance	Scorers
1	25 August 1984	Port Vale	H	1–0	3,552	Caldwell
2	1 September 1984	Rochdale	H	5–1	2,627	Vinter, Caldwell (2), Kearney, Lowery
3	8 September 1984	Peterborough United	A	0–1	3,502	
4	15 September 1984	Crewe Alexandra	H	0–2	2,681	
5	19 September 1984	Colchester United	H	0–1	2,114	
6	22 September 1984	Stockport County	A	1–1	1,635	Caldwell
7	29 September 1984	Swindon Town	H	0–0	2,225	
8	3 October 1984	Exeter City	A	0–0	2,097	
9	6 October 1984	Hereford United	A	0–3	3,537	
10	13 October 1984	Torquay United	H	1–0	1,927	Garner
11	20 October 1984	Wrexham	H	1–0	1,779	Kearney
12	23 October 1984	Aldershot	A	0–0	1,765	
13	27 October 1984	Hartlepool United	A	0–0	4,349	
14	3 November 1984	Tranmere Rovers	H	0–0	1,996	
15	7 November 1984	Chester City	H	2–0	1,789	Caldwell (2)
16	10 November 1984	Halifax Town	A	0–1	1,237	
17	24 November 1984	Bury	H	0–2	2,587	
18	1 December 1984	Blackpool	A	0–1	2,796	
19	22 December 1984	Northampton Town	H	2–0	1,783	Caldwell (2)
20	26 December 1984	Chesterfield	A	0–0	6,960	
21	29 December 1984	Southend United	A	3–1	2,493	Woodhead, Vinter, Galloway
22	1 January 1985	Darlington	H	2–0	3,116	Whatmore, Galloway
23	26 January 1985	Crewe Alexandra	A	1–1	1,764	Galloway
24	2 February 1985	Swindon Town	A	0–1	2,852	
25	22 February 1985	Tranmere Rovers	A	0–0	1,273	
26	26 February 1985	Colchester United	A	1–2	2,267	Vinter
27	2 March 1985	Hartlepool United	H	2–0	1,940	Luke (2)
28	6 March 1985	Aldershot	H	1–2	2,097	Luke
29	9 March 1985	Wrexham	A	2–2	1,426	Luke (2)
30	13 March 1985	Port Vale	H	1–1	2,161	Whatmore
31	19 March 1985	Torquay United	A	0–1	1,017	
32	23 March 1985	Hereford United	H	1–1	2,180	Whitworth
33	27 March 1985	Peterborough United	H	0–0	1,845	
34	30 March 1985	Chester City	A	3–0	1,567	Woodhead, Whatmore, Lowery
35	3 April 1985	Exeter City	H	2–2	1,703	Kearney, Whitworth
36	6 April 1985	Chesterfield	H	0–0	6,030	
37	8 April 1985	Darlington	A	1–3	4,334	Whatmore
38	13 April 1985	Halifax Town	H	2–1	1,928	Whatmore, Luke
39	17 April 1985	Stockport County	H	1–0	1,903	Whatmore
40	20 April 1985	Bury	A	0–0	3,298	
41	24 April 1985	Scunthorpe United	H	0–1	1,964	
42	27 April 1985	Blackpool	H	1–1	3,031	Lowery
43	30 April 1985	Northampton Town	A	0–1	2,350	
44	4 May 1985	Scunthorpe United	A	2–2	1,705	Garner, Caldwell
45	6 May 1985	Southend United	H	1–0	1,819	Kearney
46	14 May 1985	Rochdale	A	1–2	1,098	Whatmore

=== FA Cup ===
Round	Date	Opponent	Venue	Result	Attendance	Scorers
R1	17 November 1984	Rotherham United	H	2–1	4,161	Caldwell, Lowery
R2	8 December 1984	Bradford City	A	1–2	5,729	Barrowclough

=== League Cup ===
Round	Date	Opponent	Venue	Result	Attendance	Scorers
R1 1st leg	28 August 1984	Scunthorpe United	A	1–0	2,106	Vinter
R1 2nd leg	5 September 1984	Scunthorpe United	A	1–2	3,107	Barrowclough

=== League Trophy ===
Round	Date	Opponent	Venue	Result	Attendance	Scorers
R1 1st leg	22 January 1985	Hull City	A	2–2	2,310	Whatmore, Lowery
R1 2nd leg	6 February 1985	Hull City	H	2–1	2,116	Luke, Lowery
R2	19 February 1985	Bradford City	A	2–1	2,160	Whatmore, Galloway
QF	10 April 1985	Burnley	H	1–1 (5–3 pens)	2,540	Whatmore
SF	8 May 1985	Bolton Wanderers	A	2–1	6,706	Kearney, Caldwell
Northern Final	20 May 1985	Wigan Athletic	A	1–1 (1–3 pens)	5,214	Foster

== Squad statistics ==
- Squad list sourced from 1984–85 Mansfield Town F.C. season at the English National Football Archive (subscription required)

Pos.	Name	League		FA Cup		League Cup		League Trophy		Total	
Pos.	Name	Apps	Goals	Apps	Goals	Apps	Goals	Apps	Goals	Apps	Goals
GK	(England) Andy Beasley	3	0	0	0	0	0	0	0	3	0
GK	(England) Kevin Hitchcock	43	0	2	0	2	0	6	0	53	0
DF	(England) Colin Calderwood	41	0	2	0	2	0	6	0	51	0
DF	(England) George Foster	44	0	2	0	2	0	6	1	54	1
DF	(England) Nigel Foster	1	0	0	0	0	0	0	0	1	0
DF	(England) Mike Galloway	23(8)	3	1	0	0(1)	0	3(1)	1	27(10)	4
DF	(England) Paul Garner	38(1)	2	1	0	1	0	5	0	45(1)	2
DF	(England) David Logan	17	0	0	0	0	0	3	0	20	0
DF	(England) Craig McKernon	1(1)	0	0	0	0	0	0	0	1(1)	0
DF	(England) Gary Pollard	17(1)	0	1	0	2	0	1(3)	0	21(4)	0
DF	(England) Les Robinson	4(2)	0	0	0	0	0	0	0	4(2)	0
DF	(England) Steve Whitworth	39	2	2	0	2	0	5	0	48	2
DF	(England) Simon Woodhead	21(3)	2	0	0	1	0	4	0	26(3)	2
MF	(England) John Allen	1(1)	0	0	0	0	0	0	0	1(1)	0
MF	(Northern Ireland) John Cunningham	3(1)	0	0	0	0	0	0	0	3(1)	0
MF	(England) Mark Kearney	37(1)	4	2	0	2	0	6	1	47(1)	5
MF	(England) Tony Lowery	45	3	2	1	1	0	6	2	54	6
FW	(England) Stewart Barrowclough	14(2)	0	2	1	2	1	0	0	18(2)	0
FW	(Scotland) David Caldwell	19(1)	9	2	1	2	0	2	1	25(1)	11
FW	(England) Lee Howard	0(1)	0	0	0	0	0	0	0	0(1)	0
FW	(England) Colin Jones	5	0	0	0	0	0	0	0	5	0
FW	(England) Noel Luke	33(3)	6	2	0	2	0	2(4)	1	39(7)	7
FW	(England) Mick Vinter	31(2)	3	0	0	2	0	5	0	38(2)	3
FW	(England) Neil Whatmore	26	7	1	0	0	0	6	3	33	10
