= 1980–81 Mansfield Town F.C. season =

Mansfield Town
1980–81 season
- Manager: Mick Jones
- Stadium: Field Mill
- Fourth Division: 7th
- FA Cup: Third Round
- League Cup: Second Round

The 1980–81 season was Mansfield Town's 44th season in the Football League and 7th in the Fourth Division they finished in 7th position with 49 points.

== Final league table ==
Pos	Team	Pld	W	D	L	GF	GA	GD	Pts
5	Peterborough United	46	17	18	11	68	54	+14	52
6	Aldershot	46	18	14	14	43	41	+2	50
7	Mansfield Town	46	20	9	17	58	44	+14	49
8	Darlington	46	19	11	16	65	59	+6	49
9	Hartlepool United	46	20	9	17	64	61	+3	49

== Results ==
=== Football League Fourth Division ===
Match	Date	Opponent	Venue	Result	Attendance	Scorers
1	16 August 1980	Halifax Town	A	2–0	1,682	Austin (2)
2	18 August 1980	York City	H	0–1	4,080	
3	23 August 1980	Hereford United	H	4–0	2,879	Bird, Burrows, Austin, Caldwell
4	30 August 1980	Port Vale	A	0–0	2,558	
5	6 September 1980	Darlington	H	1–0	2,950	Hamilton
6	13 September 1980	Bury	A	1–4	2,668	McClelland
7	15 September 1980	Wimbledon	H	1–0	2,918	McClelland
8	20 September 1980	Aldershot	A	0–1	3,607	
9	27 September 1980	Wigan Athletic	H	3–1	3,402	Pollard, Hamilton, Allen
10	30 September 1980	Wimbledon	A	1–2	2,052	Austin
11	3 October 1980	Southend United	A	0–2	4,696	
12	6 October 1980	Tranmere Rovers	H	1–1	1,925	Allen
13	11 October 1980	Bradford City	H	1–0	3,234	Bird
14	18 October 1980	Bournemouth	A	1–0	3,335	Bird
15	21 October 1980	Hartlepool United	A	1–0	3,419	McClelland
16	25 October 1980	Peterborough United	H	2–1	4,883	Allen, Parkinson
17	27 October 1980	Northampton Town	H	2–0	3,560	Allen, Parkinson
18	1 November 1980	Rochdale	A	4–1	2,363	Austin (3), Arthur Mann
19	3 November 1980	Tranmere Rovers	A	0–1	2,048	
20	8 November 1980	Torquay United	H	1–1	3,266	Bird
21	11 November 1980	York City	A	0–2	2,204	
22	15 November 1980	Halifax Town	H	0–1	2,561	
23	29 November 1980	Crewe Alexandra	A	2–1	2,482	Caldwell, Parkinson
24	6 December 1980	Stockport County	H	1–0	2,808	Allen
25	19 December 1980	Doncaster Rovers	A	1–2	3,650	Caldwell
26	26 December 1980	Scunthorpe United	H	1–0	4,261	Allen
27	27 December 1980	Lincoln City	A	1–1	8,535	Thompson (o.g.)
28	10 January 1981	Northampton Town	A	1–0	2,985	McClelland
29	17 January 1981	Crewe Alexandra	H	4–1	3,215	Lumby, Caldwell, Wood, Mann
30	24 January 1981	Port Vale	H	5–0	3,864	Lumby, Caldwell (2), Wood (2), McClelland
31	31 January 1981	Hereford United	A	1–2	2,672	Lumby
32	7 February 1981	Bury	H	2–0	3,514	Bird, Caldwell
33	15 February 1981	Darlington	A	2–2	5,932	Allen, McClelland
34	21 February 1981	Wigan Athletic	A	0–2	4,032	
35	7 March 1981	Southend United	H	0–1	4,379	
36	14 March 1981	Bradford City	A	2–0	2,986	Allen, Parkinson
37	16 March 1981	Hartlepool United	H	0–1	3,737	
38	21 March 1981	Bournemouth	H	1–1	2,596	Heffernan (o.g.)
39	28 March 1981	Peterborough United	A	0–1	4,904	
40	4 April 1981	Rochdale	H	2–2	2,597	Wood, Lumby
41	6 April 1981	Aldershot	H	1–2	2,748	Burrows
42	12 April 1981	Torquay United	A	1–1	1,666	Burrows
43	18 April 1981	Lincoln City	H	2–0	4,771	Caldwell, Thomson
44	20 April 1981	Scunthorpe United	A	0–2	1,875	
45	1 May 1981	Stockport County	A	1–2	2,236	Allen
46	6 May 1981	Doncaster Rovers	H	1–1	4,056	Lumby

=== FA Cup ===
Round	Date	Opponent	Venue	Result	Attendance	Scorers
R1	22 November 1980	Rochdale	H	3–1	3,280	Parkinson (2), Caldwell
R2	13 December 1980	Mossley	A	3–1	3,680	Austin, Thomson, Caldwell
R3	3 January 1981	Carlisle United	H	2–2	5,598	Bird, Parkinson
R3 Replay	6 January 1981	Carlisle United	A	1–2	6,929	Pollard

=== League Cup ===
Round	Date	Opponent	Venue	Result	Attendance	Scorers
R1 1st leg	9 August 1980	Doncaster Rovers	A	1–1	4,201	Caldwell
R1 2nd leg	12 August 1980	Doncaster Rovers	H	2–1	3,420	Austin, Pollard
R2 1st leg	26 August 1980	Barnsley	H	0–0	6,294	
R2 2nd leg	2 September 1980	Barnsley	A	2–4	10,556	McClelland, Parkinson

== Squad statistics ==
- Squad list sourced from 1980–81 Mansfield Town F.C. season at the English National Football Archive (subscription required)

Pos.	Name	League		FA Cup		League Cup		Total	
Pos.	Name	Apps	Goals	Apps	Goals	Apps	Goals	Apps	Goals
GK	(England) Rod Arnold	38	0	4	0	4	0	46	0
GK	(England) Steve Sutton	8	0	0	0	0	0	8	0
DF	(England) Kevin Bird	42	5	4	1	4	0	50	6
DF	(England) Adrian Burrows	19(1)	3	0(1)	0	4	0	23(2)	3
DF	(England) Derek Dawkins	12	0	0	0	4	0	16	0
DF	(England) Barry Foster	13	0	2	0	0	0	15	0
DF	(England) Steve Johnson	1	0	0	0	0	0	1	0
DF	(Northern Ireland) John McClelland	46	6	4	0	4	1	54	7
DF	(Scotland) Les McJannet	34	0	4	0	0	0	38	0
DF	(England) Ian Wood	21(2)	4	2	0	0	0	23(2)	4
DF	(England) Simon Woodhead	0(1)	0	0	0	0	0	0(1)	0
MF	(England) Neville Hamilton	36(2)	2	4	0	0(1)	0	40(3)	2
MF	(Scotland) Arthur Mann	44	2	4	0	4	0	52	2
MF	(England) Noel Parkinson	35	4	2	3	4	1	41	8
MF	(Jamaica) Brendon Phillips	17	0	2	0	4	0	23	0
FW	(England) Russell Allen	35(1)	9	2	1	0	0	37(1)	10
FW	(England) Terry Austin	22	7	0	0	4	1	26	8
FW	(Scotland) David Caldwell	23(5)	8	4	2	4	1	31(5)	11
FW	(England) Jim Lumby	11(1)	4	0	0	0	0	11(1)	4
FW	(England) Brian Pollard	25(9)	1	2	1	4	1	31(9)	3
FW	(Scotland) Brian Thomson	24(2)	1	4	1	0	0	28(2)	2
–	Own goals	–	2	–	0	–	0	–	2
