= 1976 Football League Cup final =

- Event: 1975–76 Football League Cup
Manchester City	Newcastle United
2	1
- Date: 28 February 1976
- Venue: Wembley Stadium, London
- Referee: Jack Taylor
- Attendance: 100,000

The 1976 Football League Cup final took place between Manchester City and Newcastle United on 28 February 1976 at Wembley Stadium. It was the sixteenth final and the tenth Football League Cup final to be played at Wembley. Manchester City won the match 2–1 to win the competition for the second time. The match is best known for its winning goal, an overhead kick by Dennis Tueart.

== Road to Wembley ==
=== Manchester City ===
The 1976 final was the third time Manchester City had reached Wembley in the competition after winning the competition in 1970 by defeating West Bromwich Albion, and finishing runners-up to Wolverhampton Wanderers in 1974. Manchester City made a slow start to their cup run, the second round tie against Norwich City went to two replays, Manchester City winning the second replay 6–1 at Stamford Bridge. A 2–1 home win against Nottingham Forest in the third round set up a Manchester derby against local rivals Manchester United. City beat their neighbours 4–0 to reach the quarter-finals. A 4–2 win against Mansfield Town secured a two-legged semi-final against Middlesbrough. City lost the away leg 1–0, but a comfortable 4–0 win at Maine Road took them through to the final.

=== Newcastle United ===
1976 was Newcastle's first League Cup final appearance. Their previous best in the competition was reaching the quarter-finals, achieved the preceding season. Their 1975–76 League Cup campaign started with a 6–0 demolition of Fourth Division Southport in the second round. Newcastle required a replay to overcome Bristol Rovers in the third round, and then beat Queens Park Rangers 3–1 at Loftus Road to reach the quarter-finals. A 1–0 win at home to fellow Magpies Notts County secured a semi-final against Tottenham Hotspur. The first leg of the semi-final resulted in a 1–0 defeat, but Newcastle overcame the deficit in the home leg by winning 3–1.

== Match summary ==
Manchester City fielded a line-up unchanged from their previous match, a 3–0 home win against Everton in the league. Colin Bell was absent through injury, having suffered what later transpired to be a career-ending injury in the fourth round derby. Dave Watson was an injury doubt due to a slipped disc, but was selected despite his inability to train in the preceding week.

The opening goal was scored early in the match. Newcastle's Glenn Keeley fouled Joe Royle in the middle of the Newcastle half. The resulting free-kick was hoisted into the penalty area by Asa Hartford, where it was headed across goal by Mike Doyle. Teenage winger Peter Barnes then scored to give Manchester City the lead. Newcastle equalised in the 35th minute, Alan Gowling finishing from a Malcolm Macdonald cross. At the start of the second half a Manchester City attack led to the winning goal, scored by Dennis Tueart, who had supported Newcastle as a boy. A ball by Willie Donachie to the far post was headed across by Tommy Booth. Tueart, with his back to goal, performed an overhead kick that bounced beyond Mike Mahoney into the bottom left corner of the net. After the match Tueart described the goal as "the greatest of my career". No more goals were scored in the match, though Royle had an effort disallowed. City captain Doyle lifted the trophy, and Tony Book became the first man to win the competition as both a player and a manager.

== Match details ==
28 February 1976
15:30 BST

Manchester City	2–1	Newcastle United
Barnes 11'; Tueart 46'		Gowling 35'

Wembley Stadium, London
Attendance: 100,000
Referee: Jack Taylor

Manchester City	Newcastle United

GK	1	(England) Joe Corrigan
DF	2	(England) Ged Keegan
DF	3	(Scotland) Willie Donachie
DF	4	(England) Mike Doyle (c)
DF	5	(England) Dave Watson
MF	6	(England) Alan Oakes
MF	7	(England) Peter Barnes
MF	8	(England) Tommy Booth
FW	9	(England) Joe Royle
MF	10	(Scotland) Asa Hartford
FW	11	(England) Dennis Tueart
Substitute:
DF	12	(England) Kenny Clements
Manager:
(England) Tony Book

GK	1	(England) Mike Mahoney
DF	2	(England) Irving Nattrass
DF	3	(England) Alan Kennedy
MF	4	(England) Stewart Barrowclough
DF	5	(England) Glenn Keeley
DF	6	(England) Pat Howard
FW	7	(England) Micky Burns
MF	8	(Northern Ireland) Tommy Cassidy
FW	9	(England) Malcolm Macdonald
FW	10	(England) Alan Gowling
MF	11	(Scotland) Tommy Craig (c)
Substitute:
FW	12	(England) Paul Cannell
Manager:
(England) Gordon Lee
