= Partridge (surname) =

Partridge is a surname. Notable people with the name include:

- Alan Partridge, fictional character
- Alden Partridge (1785–1854), United States Army officer, writer and politician
- Alex Partridge (born 1981), British Olympic silver medal-winning rower
- Andy Partridge (born 1953), British guitarist and songwriter
- Beatrice Partridge (1866–1963), English-born New Zealand painter
- Dan Partridge (born 1992/1993), English musical theatre actor
- Dave Partridge, English footballer
- David Partridge (born 1978), Welsh footballer
- Don Partridge (1944–2010), English busker, one-man band and singer-songwriter
- Edward Partridge Sr. (1793–1840), first bishop of the Church of Jesus Christ of Latter Day Saints
- Eric Partridge (1894–1979), New Zealand–British lexicographer of the English language, particularly of its slang
- Frances Partridge (née Marshall, 1900–2004), English writer
- Frank Partridge (disambiguation), multiple people
- George Partridge (1740–1828), American teacher and politician
- George E. Partridge (1870–1953), American psychologist
- Haylee Partridge (born 1981), New Zealand cricketer
- Ian Partridge (born 1938), English tenor
- James Partridge (1952–2020), English health economist, founder of Changing Faces charity
- Jerry Partridge, American football coach
- John Partridge (disambiguation), multiple people
- Joseph Partridge (disambiguation), multiple people
- Josiah Partridge (1805–1897), lawyer in South Australia
- Joy Partridge (1899–1947), English international cricketer
- Kenneth Partridge (1926–2015), English interior designer
- Louis Partridge (born 2003), English actor
- Norman Partridge (cricketer) (1900–1982), English cricketer
- Oliver Partridge (1712–1792), military commander, politician and early American patriot
- Pat Partridge (1933–2014), English football referee
- Pauline Dunwell Partridge (1879–1944), American writer
- Ralph Partridge (1894–1960), member of Bloomsbury Group
- Reg Partridge (1912–1997), English cricketer
- Reuben Partridge (1823–1900), American pioneer bridge builder
- Richard Partridge (1805–1873), British surgeon
- Roi George Partridge (1888–1984), American printmaker
- Travis Partridge (born 1990), American football player
- Wendy Partridge, Canada-based costume designer
- William Ordway Partridge (1861–1930), American sculptor
