= David Partridge (disambiguation) =

David Partridge (born 1978) is a Welsh footballer.

David Partridge may also refer to:

- David Partridge (cricketer) (born 1954), English cricketer
- David Partridge (artist) (1919–2006), Canadian artist and sculptor
- Dave Partridge (born 1941), English footballer
