= Lee Howard =

Lee Howard may refer to:

- Lee Howard (baseball) (1923–2018), American baseball player
- Lee Howard (footballer) (born 1967), English footballer
- Lee Howard (journalist) (1914–1978), British newspaper editor
