= Gary Nicholson =

Gary Nicholson may refer to:

- Gary Nicholson (footballer) (born 1960), English professional footballer
- Gary Nicholson (singer), American singer-songwriter
