= John Partridge =

John Partridge may refer to:

- John Partridge (artist) (1789–1872), British portrait painter
- John Partridge (astrologer) (1644–1710s), English astrologer
- John Partridge (actor) (born 1971), English actor, singer and dancer
- John Bernard Partridge (1861–1945), British illustrator, nephew of the artist
- John Slater Partridge (1870–1926), U.S. federal judge
- John Nelson Partridge (1838–1920), police commissioner in Brooklyn and New York City
- John Partridge (footballer) (born 1962), English footballer
- J. Colin Partridge (born 1949), American pediatrician and neonatologist

== See also ==
- John Partridge House, historic house in Millis, Massachusetts
