= 1975–76 Football League Cup =

League Cup

Tournament details
- Country: England; Wales
- Teams: 92

Final positions
- Champions: Manchester City
- Runners-up: Newcastle United

Tournament statistics
- Top goal scorer(s): Dennis Tueart; Alan Gowling (7 goals)

The 1975–76 Football League Cup was the 16th season of the Football League Cup, a knockout competition for England's top 92 football clubs. The tournament started on 18 August 1975 and ended with the final at Wembley on 28 February 1976. This was the first season in which the First Round was played over two legs. Manchester City won the tournament after defeating Newcastle United in the final at Wembley Stadium, London.

== First round ==
=== First leg ===
Home team	Score	Away team	Date
Aldershot	1–1	Portsmouth	20 August 1975
Bradford City	2–0	York City	20 August 1975
Brentford	2–1	Brighton & Hove Albion	19 August 1975
Bury	2–0	Rochdale	19 August 1975
Cambridge United	1–1	Charlton Athletic	19 August 1975
Cardiff City	1–2	Bristol Rovers	20 August 1975
Crewe Alexandra	2–1	Tranmere Rovers	20 August 1975
Crystal Palace	3–0	Colchester United	19 August 1975
Darlington	0–2	Sheffield Wednesday	19 August 1975
Doncaster Rovers	3–1	Grimsby Town	19 August 1975
Halifax Town	4–1	Hartlepool	19 August 1975
Huddersfield Town	2–1	Barnsley	19 August 1975
Lincoln City	4–2	Chesterfield	20 August 1975
Mansfield Town	4–0	Scunthorpe United	20 August 1975
Newport County	1–1	Exeter City	19 August 1975
Oldham Athletic	3–0	Workington	18 August 1975
Plymouth Argyle	2–0	Bournemouth	19 August 1975
Port Vale	4–2	Hereford United	19 August 1975
Preston North End	2–0	Blackburn Rovers	19 August 1975
Reading	0–1	Gillingham	20 August 1975
Rotherham United	1–2	Nottingham Forest	19 August 1975
Southend United	2–0	Peterborough United	20 August 1975
Southport	3–1	Stockport County	20 August 1975
Swansea City	1–2	Torquay United	19 August 1975
Swindon Town	2–1	Millwall	19 August 1975
Walsall	0–0	Shrewsbury Town	19 August 1975
Watford	2–0	Northampton Town	19 August 1975
Wrexham	3–0	Chester	20 August 1975

=== Second leg ===
Home team	Score	Away team	Date	Agg
Barnsley	1–1	Huddersfield Town	27 August 1975	2–3
Blackburn Rovers	0–0	Preston North End	27 August 1975	0–2
Bournemouth	1–2	Plymouth Argyle	26 August 1975	1–4
Brighton & Hove Albion	1–1	Brentford	27 August 1975	2–3
Bristol Rovers	1–1	Cardiff City	26 August 1975	3–2
Charlton Athletic	3–0	Cambridge United	26 August 1975	4–1
Chester	0–0	Wrexham	27 August 1975	0–3
Chesterfield	3–2	Lincoln City	25 August 1975	5–6
Colchester United	3–1	Crystal Palace	25 August 1975	3–4
Exeter City	2–0	Newport County	26 August 1975	3–1
Gillingham	1–1	Reading	25 August 1975	2–1
Grimsby Town	0–0	Doncaster Rovers	25 August 1975	1–3
Hartlepool	2–1	Halifax Town	25 August 1975	3–5
Hereford United	2–0	Port Vale	27 August 1975	4–4
Millwall	0–1	Swindon Town	25 August 1975	1–3
Northampton Town	1–1	Watford	27 August 1975	1–3
Nottingham Forest	5–1	Rotherham United	27 August 1975	7–2
Peterborough United	3–0	Southend United	27 August 1975	3–2
Portsmouth	2–1	Aldershot	26 August 1975	3–2
Rochdale	0–2	Bury	26 August 1975	0–4
Scunthorpe United	0–2	Mansfield Town	26 August 1975	0–6
Sheffield Wednesday	0–2	Darlington	27 August 1975	2–2
Shrewsbury Town	2–1	Walsall	26 August 1975	2–1
Stockport County	1–2	Southport	25 August 1975	2–5
Torquay United	5–3	Swansea City	27 August 1975	7–4
Tranmere Rovers	2–1	Crewe Alexandra	26 August 1975	3–3
Workington	1–3	Oldham Athletic	26 August 1975	1–6
York City	3–0	Bradford City	26 August 1975	3–2

=== Replays ===
Home team	Score	Away team	Date
Crewe Alexandra	2–1	Tranmere Rovers	2 September 1975
Port Vale	0–1	Hereford United	1 September 1975
Sheffield Wednesday	0–0	Darlington	3 September 1975

== Second round ==
=== Ties ===
Home team	Score	Away team	Date
Aston Villa	2–0	Oldham Athletic	10 September 1975
Birmingham City	4–0	Orient	9 September 1975
Bolton Wanderers	1–3	Coventry City	10 September 1975
Bury	1–2	Middlesbrough	9 September 1975
Carlisle United	2–0	Gillingham	9 September 1975
Charlton Athletic	3–3	Oxford United	9 September 1975
Crewe Alexandra	1–0	Chelsea	10 September 1975
Darlington	2–1	Luton Town	9 September 1975
Derby County	2–1	Huddersfield Town	10 September 1975
Doncaster Rovers	2–1	Crystal Palace	9 September 1975
Everton	2–2	Arsenal	9 September 1975
Halifax Town	2–4	Sheffield United	10 September 1975
Hereford United	1–4	Burnley	10 September 1975
Hull City	4–2	Preston North End	9 September 1975
Leeds United	3–2	Ipswich Town	9 September 1975
Lincoln City	2–1	Stoke City	10 September 1975
Manchester United	2–1	Brentford	10 September 1975
Newcastle United	6–0	Southport	10 September 1975
Norwich City	1–1	Manchester City	10 September 1975
Nottingham Forest	1–0	Plymouth Argyle	10 September 1975
Notts County	2–1	Sunderland	9 September 1975
Peterborough United	2–0	Blackpool	10 September 1975
Portsmouth	1–1	Leicester City	9 September 1975
Shrewsbury Town	1–4	Queens Park Rangers	9 September 1975
Southampton	0–1	Bristol Rovers	9 September 1975
Swindon Town	2–2	Wolverhampton Wanderers	9 September 1975
Torquay United	1–1	Exeter City	10 September 1975
Watford	0–1	Tottenham Hotspur	9 September 1975
West Bromwich Albion	1–1	Fulham	9 September 1975
West Ham United	0–0	Bristol City	9 September 1975
Wrexham	1–2	Mansfield Town	10 September 1975
York City	0–1	Liverpool	10 September 1975

=== Replays ===
Home team	Score	Away team	Date
Arsenal	0–1	Everton	23 September 1975
Bristol City	1–3	West Ham United	24 September 1975
Exeter City	1–2	Torquay United	17 September 1975
Fulham	1–0	West Bromwich Albion	24 September 1975
Leicester City	1–0	Portsmouth	17 September 1975
Manchester City	2–2	Norwich City	17 September 1975
Oxford United	1–1	Charlton Athletic	17 September 1975
Wolverhampton Wanderers	3–2	Swindon Town	16 September 1975

=== 2nd Replays ===
Manchester City played Norwich City on neutral territory, at Chelsea's Stamford Bridge stadium.

Home team	Score	Away team	Date
Norwich City	1–6	Manchester City	29 September 1975
Oxford United	2–3	Charlton Athletic	29 September 1975

== Third round ==
=== Ties ===
Home team	Score	Away team	Date
Aston Villa	1–2	Manchester United	8 October 1975
Birmingham City	0–2	Wolverhampton Wanderers	7 October 1975
Bristol Rovers	1–1	Newcastle United	7 October 1975
Crewe Alexandra	0–2	Tottenham Hotspur	8 October 1975
Everton	2–0	Carlisle United	8 October 1975
Fulham	0–1	Peterborough United	8 October 1975
Hull City	2–0	Sheffield United	7 October 1975
Leeds United	0–1	Notts County	8 October 1975
Leicester City	2–1	Lincoln City	8 October 1975
Liverpool	1–1	Burnley	7 October 1975
Manchester City	2–1	Nottingham Forest	8 October 1975
Mansfield Town	2–0	Coventry City	8 October 1975
Middlesbrough	1–0	Derby County	7 October 1975
Queens Park Rangers	1–1	Charlton Athletic	7 October 1975
Torquay United	1–1	Doncaster Rovers	7 October 1975
West Ham United	3–0	Darlington	8 October 1975

=== Replays ===
Home team	Score	Away team	Date
Burnley	1–0	Liverpool	14 October 1975
Charlton Athletic	0–3	Queens Park Rangers	14 October 1975
Doncaster Rovers	3–0	Torquay United	13 October 1975
Newcastle United	2–0	Bristol Rovers	15 October 1975

== Fourth round ==
=== Ties ===
Home team	Score	Away team	Date
Burnley	2–0	Leicester City	11 November 1975
Doncaster Rovers	2–1	Hull City	11 November 1975
Everton	2–2	Notts County	11 November 1975
Manchester City	4–0	Manchester United	12 November 1975
Mansfield Town	1–0	Wolverhampton Wanderers	12 November 1975
Middlesbrough	3–0	Peterborough United	11 November 1975
Queens Park Rangers	1–3	Newcastle United	11 November 1975
Tottenham Hotspur	0–0	West Ham United	12 November 1975

=== Replays ===
Home team	Score	Away team	Date
Notts County	2–0	Everton	25 November 1975
West Ham United	0–2	Tottenham Hotspur	24 November 1975

== Fifth Round ==
=== Ties ===
Home team	Score	Away team	Date
Burnley	0–2	Middlesbrough	3 December 1975
Manchester City	4–2	Mansfield Town	3 December 1975
Newcastle United	1–0	Notts County	3 December 1975
Tottenham Hotspur	7–2	Doncaster Rovers	3 December 1975

== Semi-finals ==
=== First leg ===
Home team	Score	Away team	Date
Middlesbrough	1–0	Manchester City	13 January 1976
Tottenham Hotspur	1–0	Newcastle United	14 January 1976

=== Second leg ===
Home team	Score	Away team	Date	Agg
Manchester City	4–0	Middlesbrough	21 January 1976	4–1
Newcastle United	3–1	Tottenham Hotspur	21 January 1976	3–2

== Final ==
The final was held at Wembley Stadium, London on 28 February 1976.

28 February 1976
15:00 BST

Manchester City	2–1	Newcastle United
Barnes 11'; Tueart 46'		Gowling 35'

Wembley Stadium, London
Attendance: 100,000
Referee: J.K. Taylor

MANCHESTER CITY:
GK	1	Joe Corrigan
DF	2	Ged Keegan
DF	3	Willie Donachie
DF	4	Mike Doyle (c)
DF	5	Dave Watson
MF	6	Alan Oakes
MF	7	Peter Barnes
MF	8	Tommy Booth
FW	9	Joe Royle
MF	10	Asa Hartford
FW	11	Dennis Tueart
Substitute:
DF	12	Kenny Clements
Manager:
Tony Book

NEWCASTLE UNITED:
GK	1	Mike Mahoney
DF	2	Irving Nattrass
DF	3	Alan Kennedy
MF	4	Stewart Barrowclough
DF	5	Glenn Keeley
DF	6	Pat Howard
MF	7	Micky Burns
MF	8	Tommy Cassidy
FW	9	Malcolm Macdonald
FW	10	Alan Gowling
MF	11	Tommy Craig (c)
Substitute:
FW	12	Paul Cannell
Manager:
Gordon Lee
