= Marske United F.C. =

Association football club in England

Coordinates: 54°35′21.01″N 1°01′00.03″W

Marske United
- Full name: Marske United Football Club
- Nickname: The Seasiders
- Founded: 1956
- Ground: Mount Pleasant, Marske
- Chairman: Chris Varney
- Manager: Paul Burton
- League: Northern League Division One
- 2025–26: Northern League Division One, 16th of 19
- Website: https://www.marskeunitedfc.org/
Home colours	Away colours

Marske United Football Club is a football club based in Marske-by-the-Sea, North Yorkshire, England. They are currently members of the Northern League Division One and play at Mount Pleasant.

== History ==
The club was established in 1956 by members of Marske Cricket Club. They initially played in the Cleveland League and then the South Bank League before moving up to the Teesside League in 1976. The club won both the Teesside League and the North Riding County Cup in 1980–81. They were league champions again in 1984–85, after which the club moved up to the Wearside League. The following season saw the club win the North Riding County Cup for a second time. They won the League Cup in 1992–93.

Marske were runners-up in the Wearside League in 1993–94 and 1994–95, a season that also saw them win the North Riding Senior Cup and the League Cup. They went on to win the Wearside League title in 1995–96, as well as retaining the League Cup. After finishing as runners-up again in 1996–97, the club were promoted to Division Two of the Northern League. In their first season in Division Two they finished third, and were promoted to Division One. The club were relegated back to Division Two at the end of the 2003–04 season, but were promoted to Division One in 2010–11 after finishing third. They won the League Cup in 2013–14 and were Northern League champions the following season, declining promotion to the Northern Premier League. The club were Division One runners-up in 2015–16. In 2017–18 they reached the semi-finals of the FA Vase, losing 3–2 on aggregate to Stockton Town.

The 2017–18 season saw Marske win the Division One title again, earning promotion to Division One East of the Northern Premier League. In 2019–20 the club won the North Riding Senior Cup for the second time, defeating Thornaby 6–0. In 2021–22 they finished second in Division One East, qualifying for the promotion play-offs. After beating Shildon in the semi-finals, they defeated local rivals Stockton Town 2–1 in final to secure promotion to the Premier Division. However, the club resigned from the Northern Premier League in January 2024 due to financial issues. They subsequently dropped two levels and were admitted to Division One of the Northern League for the 2024–25 season.

=== Season-by-season record ===
Season	Division	Lvl	P	W	D	L	GF	GA	GD	Pts	Pos	FA Cup	FA Trophy	FA Vase	Notes
1976–77	Teesside League	N/A	32	11	5	16	–	–	–	27	11/18				Record incomplete (Note: Records complete only to 30 April 1977.)
1977–78	Teesside League	N/A	30	8	11	11	–	–	–	27	12/18				Record incomplete (Note: Records complete only to 8 April 1978.)
1978–79	Teesside League	N/A	34	13	4	17	47	67	–20	30	11/18				
1979–80	Teesside League	N/A	34	19	9	6	70	37	+33	47	4/18				
1980–81	Teesside League	N/A	34	24	7	3	85	36	+49	55	1/18				Champions
1981–82	Teesside League	N/A	30	6	12	12	52	60	–8	24	13/16				
1982–83	Teesside League	N/A	30	5	16	9	43	45	–2	26	11/16				
1983–84	Teesside League	N/A	34	13	6	15	59	53	+6	32	10/18				
1984–85															
1985–86	Wearside League	N/A	34	18	3	13	70	44	+26	39	8/18				
1986–87	Wearside League	N/A	38	18	9	11	67	47	+20	63	7/20			EP	
1987–88	Wearside League	N/A	38	18	8	12	72	62	+10	62	6/20			PR	
1988–89	Wearside League Division One	N/A	32	15	7	10	60	49	+11	52	6/17			EP	
1989–90	Wearside League Division One	N/A	28	11	5	12	50	57	–7	38	8/15			EP	
1990–91	Wearside League Division One	N/A	34	16	5	13	82	58	+24	53	6/18			EP	
1991–92	Wearside League Division One	10	30	20	4	6	85	37	+48	58	4/16			1R	
1992–93	Wearside League Division One	10	28	12	11	5	55	37	+18	47	5/15			EP	
1993–94	Wearside League Division One	10	32	25	2	5	97	25	+72	74 *	2/17			EP	
1994–95	Wearside League Division One	10	34	24	8	2	109	44	+55	80	2/18			PR	
1995–96	Wearside League Division One	10	30	22	3	5	97	29	+68	69	1/16			1R	Champions
1996–97	Wearside League	10	34	25	5	4	97	24	+73	80	2/18			2Q	Promoted
1997–98	Northern League Division Two	9	36	24	5	7	78	30	+48	77	3/19			3R	Promoted
1998–99	Northern League Division One	8	38	13	9	16	58	63	–5	48	12/20	PR		1Q	
1999–2000	Northern League Division One	8	38	19	8	11	67	45	+22	65	4/20	1Q		2R	
2000–01	Northern League Division One	8	40	24	7	9	82	35	+47	79	3/21	2Q		QF	
2001–02	Northern League Division One	8	40	21	8	11	56	48	+8	71	4/21	PR		2R	
2002–03	Northern League Division One	8	40	13	10	17	64	74	–10	49	16/21	EP		1Q	
2003–04	Northern League Division One	8	40	8	9	23	46	76	–30	33	20/21	1Q		1Q	Relegated
2004–05	Northern League Division Two	10	38	11	5	22	50	78	–28	38	15/20	PR		1R	
2005–06	Northern League Division Two	10	38	12	13	13	62	69	–7	49	10/20	PR		1R	
2006–07	Northern League Division Two	10	40	20	13	7	68	44	+24	73	5/21	2Q		1Q	
2007–08	Northern League Division Two	10	38	17	8	13	69	43	+26	59	8/20	PR		1R	
2008–09	Northern League Division Two	10	38	18	8	12	63	59	+4	62	5/20	EP		QF	
2009–10	Northern League Division Two	10	38	22	9	7	77	34	+43	75	4/20	EP		5R	
2010–11	Northern League Division Two	10	38	25	7	6	95	41	+54	82	3/20	1Q		2R	Promoted
2011–12	Northern League Division One	9	42	11	11	20	61	89	–28	44	18/22	PR		2Q	
2012–13	Northern League Division One	9	46	15	4	27	66	91	–25	49	19/24	PR		1Q	
2013–14	Northern League Division One	9	44	14	10	20	64	88	–24	52	16/23	4Q		1R	
2014–15	Northern League Division One	9	42	27	9	6	118	54	+64	90	1/22	1Q		3R	Champions
2015–16	Northern League Division One	9	42	26	3	13	86	60	+26	81	2/22	PR		4R	
2016–17	Northern League Division One	9	42	22	6	14	103	75	+28	72	5/22	1Q		2R	
2017–18	Northern League Division One	9	42	32	6	4	102	31	+71	102	1/22	PR		SF	Promoted
2018–19	Northern Premier League Division One East	8	38	16	10	12	63	47	+16	58	10/20	PR	3Q		
2019–20	Northern Premier League Division One North-West	8	26	15	6	5	50	25	+25	51	5/20	1Q	EP		Season abandoned due to COVID-19 epidemic
2020–21	Northern Premier League Division One North-West	8	5	3	2	0	14	5	+9	11	8/19	3Q	2R		Season abandoned due to COVID-19 epidemic

== Coaching and medical staff ==
As of 2 October 2025

Position	Name
First Team Manager	(England) Paul Burton
First Team Head Coach	(England) Mark Riley
First Team Coach	(England) Cappy
Kit Manager	(England) Mal Bean

== List of managers ==
- 1976–1978: Dave Bice
- 1978–1981: John Smith
- 1981–1982: John Symon
- 1982–1987: Derek Walker
- 1987–1991: Dave Welch
- 1991–1997: Allan Marples
- 1997–2001: Charlie Bell
- 2001–2003: Mick Hodgson
- 2004–2005: Darren Trotter
- 2005–2008: Charlie Bell
- 2008–2012: Paul Burton
- 2012: Craig Gibbin
- 2012–2014: Ted Watts
- 2014–2022: Carl Jarrett
- 2022–2023: Curtis Woodhouse
- 2023: Carl Jarrett
- 2023–2024: Graeme Lee
- 2024–2025: Craig Skelton & Simon Kasonali
- 2025–2026: Nick Ward
- 2026-present: Paul Burton

== Honours ==
- Northern League
  - Division One champions 2014–15, 2017–18
  - League Cup winners 2013–14
- Wearside League
  - Champions 1994–95
  - League Cup winners 1994–95
- Teesside League
  - Champions 1980–81, 1984–85
- North Riding Senior Cup
  - Winners 1994–95, 2019–20
- North Riding County Cup
  - Winners 1980–81, 1985–86
- Monkwearmouth Charity Cup
  - Winners 1992–93, 1995–96
- Sunderland Shipowners Cup
  - Winners 1995–96, 1996–97

== Records ==
- Best FA Cup performance: Fourth qualifying round, 2013–14, 2020–21, 2021–22
- Best FA Trophy performance: Fourth round, 2022–23
- Best FA Vase performance: Semi-finals, 2017–18
- Record attendance: 1,500 vs Stockton Town, Northern Premier League East Division play-off final, April 2022
- Biggest win: 16–0 vs North Shields, Wearside League, April 1994
- Heaviest defeat: 3–9
- Most appearances: Mike Kinnair, 609
- Most goals: Chris Morgan, 169

== See also ==
- Marske United F.C. players
- Marske United F.C. managers
