= Craig Skelton =

English footballer (born 1980)

Personal information
- Date of birth: 14 September 1980
- Place of birth: Middlesbrough, England
- Height: 5 ft 9 in (1.75 m)
- Position: Striker

Team information
- Current team: Marske United (joint manager)

Youth career
- Darlington

Senior career*
Years	Team	Apps	(Gls)
1999–2000	Darlington	1	(0)
2000	→ Altrincham (loan)	4	(0)
2000–2001	Whitby Town		
2001–2002	Blyth Spartans		
2002	Whitby Town		
2002–2003	Billingham Town		(19)
2003	Spennymoor United		
2003–2004	Billingham Town		
2004–2005	Thornaby		
2005–2007	Northallerton Town		
2007–2008	Guisborough Town		
2008–2010	Marske United		
2010–2011	Redcar Athletic		
2011	Marske United		
2011–2012	Thornaby		(15)
2012	Marske United		
2012–201?	Redcar Athletic		

Managerial career
- 2024–: Marske United
- * Club domestic league appearances and goals

Craig Skelton , who was born on 14th September 1980, is an English footballer who played as a striker in the Football League for Darlington and in non-league football for a large number of clubs, mostly in the north east of England. He is currently joint manager of Marske United.

== Playing career ==
=== Darlington ===
As a youngster with Darlington, the Middlesbrough-born Skelton was a regular goalscorer for the junior teams. Celtic's city rivals Rangers also showed an interest, but an ankle injury prevented further progress. He returned to Scotland for further trials after his recovery, but no move ensued.

In February 2000, Skelton signed on loan for Conference Premier club Altrincham: his debut, playing in midfield in a home defeat to the division's bottom club, Welling United, was described in the local newspaper as "a baptism of fire for Skelton, who could add nothing to an ineffective Robins attack, and found himself in referee Clattenburg's book for an over-zealous challenge". He appeared in four Conference matches without scoring.

In October, his improved scoring form for Darlington's reserves earned him inclusion in the first-team squad for the visit to Cardiff City in Division Three. With Cardiff a goal up, Skelton came on for his Football League debut as an 82nd-minute substitute, but Darlington were unable to prevent the home side increasing their lead. He made no more first-team appearances for the club and, to the reported surprise of supporters, was released at the end of November when his latest monthly contract expired.

=== Non-league football ===
He signed for Whitby Town of the Northern Premier League, with whom he spent what remained of the season. He moved on to Blyth Spartans, also of the Northern Premier League, for 2001–02, but by March 2002 was back with Whitby. In November 2002, he signed for Northern League club Billingham Town, and scored 19 goals to help them reach the highest league finish in their history, third in the Northern League First Division. Early the next season, he returned to the Northern Premier with Spennymoor United, newly promoted to the First Division, but he stayed there only a month before being released back to Billingham. In his first game back, away at Durham City, he scored what was believed to be the fastest Northern League goal ever, after no more than eight seconds, and he was a member of the team that beat Bishop Auckland to win the 2004 Durham Challenge Cup, the first major trophy in the Billingham club's history.

Skelton began the 2004–05 season with Billingham, but soon moved on to fellow Northern League side Thornaby, and in January 2005, dropped down a division to join Northallerton Town, for whom he scored twice on his debut in a 3–1 win at Marske United and scored 14 goals as they came close to achieving promotion. He broke his ankle in the following pre-season, and was only able to return in the last few weeks of the campaign as Northallerton clinched promotion to the First Division. Skelton missed much of the season with injuries, and returned to the Northern League second tier with Guisborough Town in the 2007 close season.

He moved to Marske United for 2008–09, helping them reach the quarter-finals of the 2009 FA Vase fifth place in Northern League Division Two in 2008–09 and fourth in 2009–10. After a first foray into the Wearside League with Redcar Athletic for 2010–11, Skelton rejoined Marske United, newly promoted to the first tier of the Northern League, for 2011–12. He soon left for the second tier with former club Thornaby, but returned to Marske United in March 2012. He started the next season back with Redcar Athletic in the Wearside League.

== Coaching career ==
In March 2024 Skelton was appointed joint manager of Marske United alongside Simon Kasonali.
