= Jon Laws =

English footballer

Personal information
- Full name: Jonathan Laws
- Date of birth: 1 September 1964 (age 62)
- Place of birth: Peterborough, England
- Position: Midfielder

Senior career*
Years	Team	Apps	(Gls)
1982–1983	Wolverhampton Wanderers	0	(0)
1983	Mansfield Town	1	(0)
1983	Willenhall Town		
1984	Gresley Rovers		
1985	Nuneaton Borough		
1986	Leek Town		
Total		1	(0)
- * Club domestic league appearances and goals

Jonathan Laws (born 1 September 1964) is an English former professional footballer who played in the Football League for Mansfield Town.
