= Colin Jones (footballer, born 1963) =

English footballer

Personal information
- Full name: Colin Malcolm Jones
- Date of birth: 30 October 1963 (age 63)
- Place of birth: Birmingham, England
- Position: Winger

Senior career*
Years	Team	Apps	(Gls)
1983–1984	West Bromwich Albion	0	(0)
1984–1985	Mansfield Town	5	(0)
Total		5	(0)
- * Club domestic league appearances and goals

Colin Malcolm Jones (born 30 October 1963) is an English former professional footballer who played in the Football League for Mansfield Town.
