= David Partridge (cricketer) =

English cricketer (born 1954)

Personal information
- Full name: Martin David Partridge
- Born: 25 October 1954 (age 72); Birdlip, Gloucestershire, England
- Batting: Left-handed
- Bowling: Right-arm medium
- Role: Bowler

Domestic team information
- Years: Team
- 1976–1980: Gloucestershire

Career statistics
Competition	First-class	List A
Matches	46	68
Runs scored	1,202	462
Batting average	26.71	13.58
100s/50s	0/7	0/0
Top score	90	33
Balls bowled	3,463	2,549
Wickets	41	66
Bowling average	50.63	27.93
5 wickets in innings	1	1
10 wickets in match	0	0
Best bowling	5/29	5/47
Catches/stumpings	16/–	8/–
- Source: CricketArchive, 30 July 2013

Martin David Partridge (born 25 October 1954) is a former English cricketer. He played for Gloucestershire between 1976 and 1980.

His first-class debut came in a match for Gloucestershire against a visiting West Indies team in August 1976.

In 1979, he took 5/29 against Worcestershire, which was the only time he took five wickets in a first-class match.

Partridge, who studied civil engineering at Bradford University, was released from his Gloucestershire contract ahead of the 1981 season so that he could focus on work.
