= Frank Partridge =

Frank Partridge may refer to:

- Frank C. Partridge (1861–1943), United States senator from Vermont
- Frank Partridge (soldier) (1924–1964), Australian soldier, recipient of the Victoria Cross and television quiz champion
- Frank Partridge (bishop) (1877–1941), bishop of Portsmouth, 1937–1941
