= Ged Keegan =

English footballer

Personal information
- Full name: Gerard Keegan
- Date of birth: 3 October 1955 (age 71)
- Place of birth: Bradford, West Riding of Yorkshire, England
- Position: Full back

Youth career
- 1973–1975: Manchester City

Senior career*
Years	Team	Apps	(Gls)
1975–1978	Manchester City	37	(2)
1978–1983	Oldham Athletic	144	(5)
1983–1984	Mansfield Town	18	(1)
1984–1985	Rochdale	2	(0)
Total		199	(10)

International career
1976	England U21	1	(0)
- * Club domestic league appearances and goals

Gerard "Ged" Keegan (born 3 October 1955 in Bradford, West Riding of Yorkshire) is an English former footballer who played as a right-back.

== Career ==
He joined Manchester City as a trainee in 1973 and made his debut in March 1975 in a 2–1 defeat against Carlisle United. He made a total of 37 Football League appearances for the club, scoring two goals. However his most memorable game for them was in their 1976 Football League Cup Final victory. He also played in the first ever England under-21 match. In 1978, he was transferred to Oldham Athletic where he made 144 League appearances (scoring 5 goals) before moving to Mansfield Town in 1983. After a short spell here he moved on to Rochdale, and then to Altrincham.

== Retirement ==
As of 2008 he was working as a car-parking attendant at Manchester Airport.

== Honours ==
Manchester City

- Football League Cup: 1975–76
