= Glenn Keeley (footballer) =

English footballer

Personal information
- Full name: Glenn Matthew Keeley
- Date of birth: 1 September 1954 (age 72)
- Place of birth: Barking, Essex, England
- Height: 6 ft 2 in (1.88 m)
- Position: Central defender

Senior career*
Years	Team	Apps	(Gls)
1972–1974	Ipswich Town	4	(0)
1974–1976	Newcastle United	44	(2)
1976–1987	Blackburn Rovers	370	(23)
1982	→ Everton (loan)	1	(0)
1987–1988	Oldham Athletic	11	(0)
1987–1988	→ Colchester United (loan)	4	(0)
1988–1989	Bolton Wanderers	20	(0)
1989–1990	Chorley	21	(2)
1990	Colne Dynamoes	?	(?)
Total		475	(27)

International career
1973	England Youth	6	(1)
- * Club domestic league appearances and goals

Glenn Matthew Keeley (born 1 September 1954 in Barking, Essex) is an English retired footballer who played as a central defender in the Football League.

== Honours ==
Newcastle United

- Football League Cup runner-up: 1975–76

Blackburn Rovers

- Football League Third Division second-place promotion: 1979–80
- Full Members' Cup: 1986–87
