= Ray Blackhall =

English footballer

Personal information
- Full name: Raymond Blackhall
- Date of birth: 19 February 1957 (age 69)
- Place of birth: Ashington, England
- Position: Full back

Senior career*
| Years | Team | Apps | (Gls) |
| 1974–1978 | Newcastle United | 37 | (0) |
| 1978–1982 | Sheffield Wednesday | 115 | (1) |
| 1982 | IK Tord | | |
| 1982–1984 | Mansfield Town | 15 | (0) |
| 1984–1985 | Carlisle United | 1 | (0) |
| 1985 | Blyth Spartans | | |
| Total | | 168 | (1) |
- * Club domestic league appearances and goals

Raymond Blackhall (born 19 February 1957) is an English former professional footballer who played in the Football League for Carlisle United, Mansfield Town, Newcastle United and Sheffield Wednesday.
