= Mark Rhodes (footballer) =

English footballer

Personal information
- Full name: Mark Nigel Rhodes
- Date of birth: 26 August 1957 (age 69)
- Place of birth: Sheffield, England
- Height: 5 ft 8 in (1.73 m)
- Position: Midfielder

Senior career*
Years	Team	Apps	(Gls)
1975–1985	Rotherham United	258	(13)
1982–1983	→ Darlington (loan)	14	(0)
1983	→ Mansfield Town (loan)	4	(0)
1985	→ Burnley (loan)	9	(0)
1985	Burnley	4	(0)
- * Club domestic league appearances and goals

Mark Nigel Rhodes (born 26 August 1957) is an English former professional footballer who played as a midfielder. He made nearly 300 appearances in the Football League, mostly for Rotherham United, in the 1970s and 1980s.

== Honours ==
Rotherham United

- Football League Third Division: 1980–81
