= Mike Mahoney (footballer) =

English footballer and manager

Personal information
- Full name: Michael Mahoney
- Date of birth: 25 October 1950 (age 76)
- Place of birth: Bristol, England
- Height: 5 ft 11 in (1.80 m)
- Position: Goalkeeper

Senior career*
Years	Team	Apps	(Gls)
1967–1970	Bristol City	4	(0)
1970–1975	Torquay United	157	(0)
1975–1978	Newcastle United	108	(0)
1979	Chicago Sting	3	(0)
1979–1981	California Surf	25	(0)
1979–1981	California Surf (indoor)	24	(0)
1982–1986	Los Angeles Lazers (indoor)	116	(0)
Total		437	(0)

Managerial career
- 1986–1987: Los Angeles Lazers (assistant)
- 1987: Los Angeles Lazers (interim)
- * Club domestic league appearances and goals

Mike Mahoney is an English retired football goalkeeper who played professionally in England and the United States.

In 1967, Mahoney began his professional career with Bristol City. He saw limited opportunities to play before moving to Torquay United in August 1970. He played for Torquay until March 1975, when he was bought by Newcastle United. Mahoney was a popular figure on Tyneside which earned him the terrace chant of "Mick Mahoney, Super Goalie"

In November 1978, the Chicago Sting of the North American Soccer League purchased Mahoney's contract from Newcastle United. The Sting sent him to the California Surf halfway through the 1979 season. He played two and a half outdoor and two indoor seasons with the Surf. In 1982, he joined the Los Angeles Lazers of the Major Indoor Soccer League, spending four seasons with them. He retired in spring 1986 and became an assistant coach with the Lazers for the 1986–1987 season. In January 1987, he was named interim head coach after Peter Wall was fired. Following the demise of the Lazers, Mahoney retired. On 9 June 2018 it was announced that Mahoney had returned to football in a coaching role at Bristol Manor Farm.

== Honours ==
Newcastle United

- Football League Cup runner-up: 1975–76
