= Mark Reynolds (footballer, born 1966) =

English footballer

Personal information
- Full name: Mark David Reynolds
- Date of birth: 1 January 1966 (age 60)
- Place of birth: Glapwell, England
- Position: Full back

Senior career*
Years	Team	Apps	(Gls)
1982–1983	Mansfield Town	4	(0)
1984	Buxton		
Total		4	(0)
- * Club domestic league appearances and goals

Mark David Reynolds (born 1 January 1966) is an English former professional footballer who played in the Football League for Mansfield Town.
