= Mick Vinter =

English footballer (1954–2020)

Personal information
- Full name: Michael Vinter
- Date of birth: 23 May 1954
- Place of birth: Boston, England
- Date of death: 20 January 2020 (aged 65)
- Place of death: Nottingham, England
- Height: 5 ft 9 in (1.75 m)
- Position: Forward

Youth career
- Boston United

Senior career*
Years	Team	Apps	(Gls)
1971–1979	Notts County	186	(54)
1979–1982	Wrexham	101	(25)
1982–1984	Oxford United	69	(21)
1984–1986	Mansfield Town	54	(7)
1986–1987	Newport County	32	(6)
- Gainsborough Trinity
Total		442	(113)
- * Club domestic league appearances and goals

Michael Vinter (23 May 1954 – 20 January 2020) was an English professional footballer who played as a forward.

== Career ==
Born in Boston, Vinter played for Boston United, Notts County, Wrexham, Oxford United, Mansfield Town, Newport County, Gainsborough Trinity, Matlock Town, Oakham United and Hucknall Town.

He died on 20 January 2020.

== Honours ==
Oxford United

- Football League Third Division: 1983–84
