= David Coles (footballer) =

English footballer (born 1964)

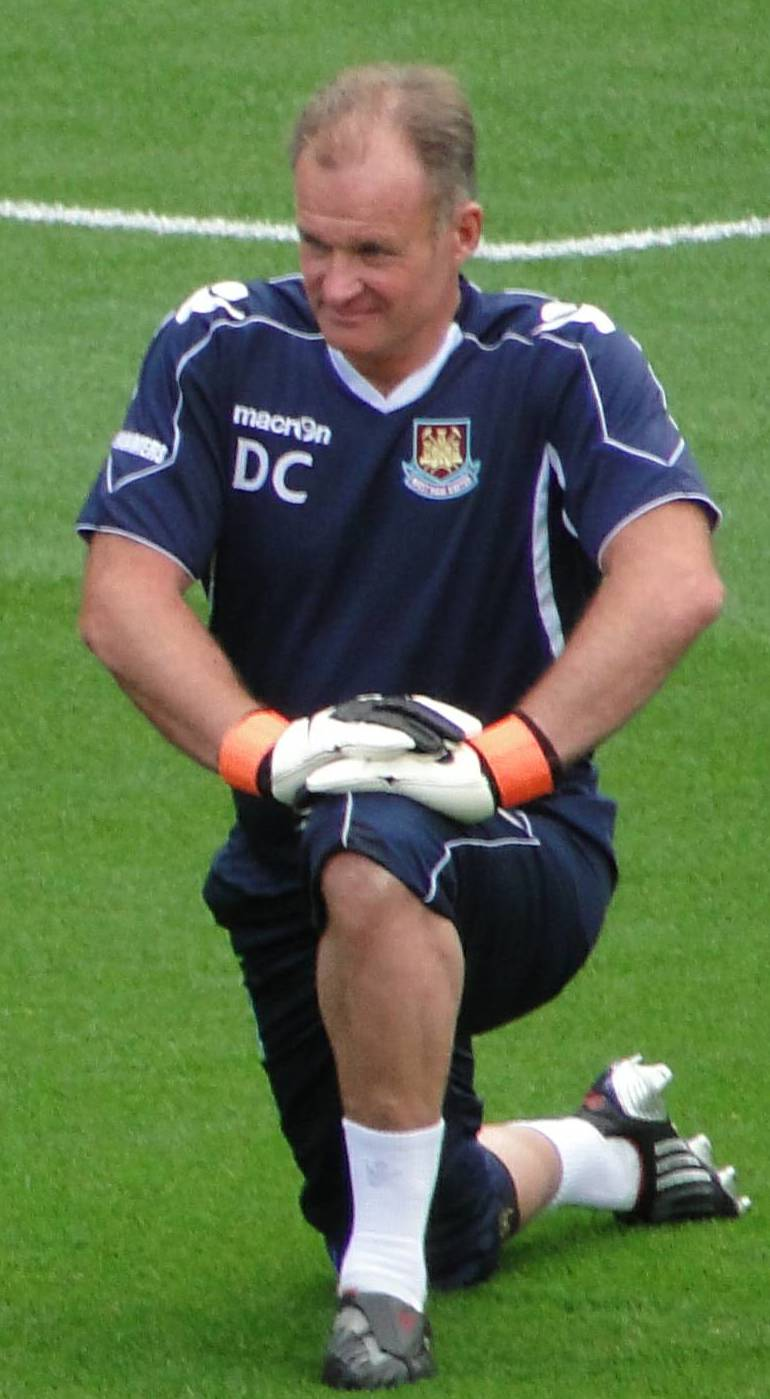
- Coles with West Ham United in 2010

Personal information
- Full name: David Andrew Coles
- Date of birth: 15 June 1964 (age 62)
- Place of birth: Wandsworth, England
- Height: 5 ft 10 in (1.78 m)
- Position: Goalkeeper

Team information
- Current team: Bristol Rovers (goalkeeping coach)

Senior career*
Years	Team	Apps	(Gls)
1982–1983	Birmingham City	0	(0)
1983	Mansfield Town	3	(0)
1983–1988	Aldershot	120	(0)
1988	→ Newport County (loan)	14	(0)
1988	HJK	4	(0)
1988–1989	Crystal Palace	0	(0)
1989	Brighton & Hove Albion	1	(0)
1989–1991	Aldershot	30	(0)
1991	Fulham	0	(0)
1991	Basingstoke Town		
1991	Crawley Town	1	(0)
1992–1994	Yeovil Town	96	(0)
1994–1997	Gloucester City	117	(0)
1994–1997	Farnborough Town	4	(0)
Total		390+	(0)
- * Club domestic league appearances and goals

David Andrew Coles (born 15 June 1964) is an English goalkeeping coach and former professional footballer. As a player, he made nearly 200 appearances in the Football League. He is Head of Goalkeeping at Bristol Rovers.

== Playing career ==
David Andrew Coles, born on 15 June 1964 in Wandsworth, London, began his football career as an apprentice with Birmingham City. He turned professional in April 1982, but was released less than a year later without playing for the first team. He played briefly for Mansfield Town, for whom he made his Football League debut, before joining Aldershot, where he remained for five seasons. In his first, he was almost ever-present and won the club's Player of the Year award. He continued as first-choice goalkeeper until a knee injury and then a broken leg cost him his place, and he spent the last few months of the 1987–88 season on loan at Newport County.

He helped HJK win the 1988 Finnish championship, and kept a clean sheet in the European Cup first round second leg as HJK narrowly failed to come back from a 3–0 first-leg deficit against Porto. He was briefly on the books of Crystal Palace before spending the last few months of the 1982–83 season at Brighton & Hove Albion as cover for John Keeley; he made one appearance in the Second Division when Keeley was unwell. Released at the end of the season, he returned to Aldershot, and two years later, having taken his league appearance total for Aldershot to 150, he spent a short spell on Fulham's books before retiring from full-time football.

Coles had started work as a PE teacher at Sindlesham School, in Winnersh, Berkshire, in 1990, and continued to play non-league football on a part-time basis. His clubs included Basingstoke Town, Crawley Town, Yeovil Town, with whom he spent two-and-a-half seasons and reached the third round of the 1992–93 FA Cup, Gloucester City, for whom he made 155 appearances in all competitions between 1994 and 1997, of which 117 were in the Southern League, and Farnborough Town.

== Coaching career ==
Coles had been involved with coaching on behalf of the Football Association when he was approached by Premier League club Southampton about their vacancy at goalkeeping coach. He initially rejected the idea because he enjoyed working in the school, but when Southampton repeated their offer in 1999, he accepted the position. After a lengthy spell with the club, which included their run to the 2003 FA Cup Final, he left in December 2005 as part of a "clear-out" of backroom staff. Coles then followed Harry Redknapp to Southampton's South Coast rivals, Portsmouth, where he worked with David James and Asmir Begović. He chose not to follow Redknapp to Tottenham Hotspur to work with Heurelho Gomes, instead staying at Portsmouth for a further two years under the management of Avram Grant, whom he then followed to West Ham United in July 2010. He parted company with the club a year later, following the arrival of Sam Allardyce as manager.

After two years with UAE Pro League club Al Jazira, Coles rejoined Portsmouth as goalkeeping coach in November 2013. Two months later, he joined Bristol City to replace Lee Kendall, who had been appointed goalkeeping coach to the England Women's team. After five and a half years with the club, he left by mutual agreement in June 2019. Coles was briefly goalkeeping coach to Forest Green Rovers before taking up the role with the England under-18 team.

Coles joined Bristol Rovers in September 2020, left briefly for family reasons in January 2021, and returned two weeks later to finish the season before being relieved of his duties by new manager Joey Barton. He joined Indian Super League club Mumbai City as goalkeeping coach ahead of their 2021–22 season. On 21 September 2022, Coles returned to Bristol Rovers as Head of Goalkeeping.

== Sources ==
- Carder, Tim; Harris, Roger (1997). Albion A–Z: A Who's Who of Brighton & Hove Albion F.C. Hove: Goldstone Books. ISBN 978-0-9521337-1-1.
- Harman, John, ed. (2005). Alliance to Conference 1979–2004: The first 25 years. Tony Williams. ISBN 978-1-869833-52-7.
