= Clive Day (footballer) =

English footballer

Personal information
- Full name: Clive Anthony Day
- Date of birth: 27 January 1961 (age 65)
- Place of birth: Orsett, England
- Position: Full back

Senior career*
Years	Team	Apps	(Gls)
1980–1982	Fulham	10	(0)
1982–1983	→ Mansfield Town (loan)	12	(1)
1983–1955	Aldershot	60	(0)
1985	Dagenham		
1986	Grays Athletic		
Total		82	(1)
- * Club domestic league appearances and goals

Clive Anthony Day (born 27 January 1961) is an English former professional footballer who played in the Football League for Aldershot, Fulham and Mansfield Town.
