= J. Colin Partridge =

American pediatrician and neonatologist

- Born: November 1949 (age 76)
- Known for: Research on neonatal intensive care, perinatal brain imaging, international medical education and neonatal medical ethics
- Awards: "For People’s Health" Medal of Vietnam
- Scientific career
- Institutions: University of California, San Francisco

John Colin Partridge (born November 1949) is an American pediatrician and neonatologist, and an expert on neonatal intensive care, perinatal brain imaging, international medical education and neonatal medical ethics. He is a Professor Emeritus of Pediatrics at the University of California, San Francisco and held the Academy Chair in Pediatric Education, an endowed chair at the same university, from 2007 to 2013. According to Google Scholar, his work has been cited over 6,700 times in scientific publications, and his h-index is 37.

He earned his MD at the University of Cincinnati College of Medicine in 1976 and joined the faculty of the Department of Pediatrics at the University of California, San Francisco in 1982. He has focused on newborn care in developing countries, and he has worked with newborn care in Laos, Vietnam, Cambodia, and Malaysia. In 2011 he received the "For People’s Health" Medal by the Vietnamese Ministry of Health "in recognition of his great contribution to pediatric retinal surgery and resuscitation." He is a trustee of Newborns Vietnam.
