= Joseph Partridge =

Joseph Partridge may refer to:

- Joseph Partridge (historian) (1724–1796), English clergyman, schoolteacher and historian
- Joseph Edward Crawshay Partridge (1879–1965), Welsh rugby union player and soldier
- Joe Partridge (1932–1988), South African cricketer
