= Lee Howard (footballer) =

English footballer

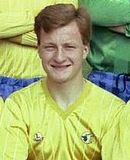
- Lee at Mansfield in 1984

Personal information
- Full name: Lee Howard
- Date of birth: 6 February 1967 (age 59)
- Place of birth: Worksop, England
- Position: Winger

Senior career*
| Years | Team | Apps | (Gls) |
| 1984–1985 | Mansfield Town | 1 | (0) |
| 1985–1991 | Harworth Colliery | | |
| 1991 | Eastwood Town | | |
| 1991 | Worksop Town | | |
| Total | | 1 | (0) |
- * Club domestic league appearances and goals

Lee Howard (born 6 February 1967) is an English former professional footballer who played in the Football League for Mansfield Town. As of 2023, Lee is now a contract manager for DWP.
