= Arthur Mann =

Scottish footballer and manager

Personal information
- Full name: Arthur Fraser Mann
- Date of birth: 23 January 1948
- Place of birth: Falkirk, Scotland
- Date of death: 4 February 1999 (aged 51)
- Place of death: Birmingham, England
- Height: 5 ft 9 in (1.75 m)
- Position: Defender

Senior career*
Years	Team	Apps	(Gls)
1967–1968	Heart of Midlothian	32	(0)
1968–1972	Manchester City	35	(0)
1971	→ Blackpool (loan)	3	(0)
1972–1979	Notts County	253	(21)
1979	Shrewsbury Town	8	(1)
1979–1982	Mansfield Town	116	(3)
Total		447	(25)

Managerial career
- 1984–1986: Boston United
- * Club domestic league appearances and goals

Arthur Fraser Mann (23 January 1948 – 4 February 1999) was a Scottish professional footballer, who played as a defender. He later moved into management and coaching.

== Biography ==
Mann was born in Burntisland, Scotland and began his playing career at Heart of Midlothian. He played for Hearts in the 1968 Scottish Cup Final, although he ended up on the losing side as Dunfermline won 3–1. He then moved to England, where he represented Manchester City. He was signed by Joe Mercer and Malcolm Allison for a then club record of £65,000. In common with Dennis Bergkamp, he had a fear of flying and so was unable to take part in City's European escapades. He failed to break into the Cup winning side and moved on after a season to Blackpool. He then moved to Notts County, Shrewsbury Town, Mansfield Town, Boston United (whom he also managed), Kettering Town and Telford United. He was Alan Buckley's assistant manager at Grimsby Town and West Bromwich Albion, and had a spell as caretaker-manager at Albion early in 1997 following Buckley's dismissal. He is the father of former Hull City stalwart Neil Mann. Mann died on 4 February 1999 in an industrial accident at a Birmingham factory.

== Honours ==
Manchester City

- Football League Cup: 1969–70
