= Ian Wood (footballer, born 1958) =

English footballer

Personal information
- Date of birth: 24 May 1958 (age 68)
- Place of birth: Kirkby-in-Ashfield, England
- Position: Defender

Senior career*
Years	Team	Apps	(Gls)
1975–1982	Mansfield Town	149	(9)
1982–1983	Aldershot	14	(1)
- Boston United
Total		163	(10)
- * Club domestic league appearances and goals

Ian Wood (born 24 May 1958) is an English former footballer who played in the Football League for Aldershot and Mansfield Town.
