= John Partridge (footballer) =

English footballer

Personal information
- Full name: John Thomas Partridge
- Date of birth: 14 September 1962 (age 64)
- Place of birth: Chesterfield, England
- Position: Full-back

Senior career*
Years	Team	Apps	(Gls)
1981–1983	Chesterfield	38	(0)
1983–1984	→ Mansfield Town (loan)	1	(0)
1984	Alfreton Town		
Total		39	(0)
- * Club domestic league appearances and goals

John Thomas Partridge (born 14 September 1962) is an English former professional footballer who played in the Football League for Chesterfield and Mansfield Town.
