= Mark Sindall =

English footballer

Personal information
- Full name: Mark Sindall
- Date of birth: 3 September 1964 (age 62)
- Place of birth: Shirebrook, England
- Position: Midfielder

Senior career*
Years	Team	Apps	(Gls)
1981	Notts County	0	(0)
1982	Luton Town	0	(0)
1982–1984	Mansfield Town	21	(0)
Total		21	(0)
- * Club domestic league appearances and goals

Mark Sindall (born 3 September 1964) is an English former professional footballer who played in the Football League for Mansfield Town.
