= Mike Galloway (footballer) =

English-born Scottish football player (1965–2026)

Personal information
- Full name: Michael Galloway
- Date of birth: 30 May 1965
- Place of birth: Oswestry, England
- Date of death: May 2026 (aged 60)
- Height: 5 ft 11 in (1.80 m)
- Positions: Defender; midfielder

Youth career
- Tynecastle Boys Club

Senior career*
Years	Team	Apps	(Gls)
1983	Berwick Rangers		
1983–1986	Mansfield Town	54	(3)
1986–1987	Halifax Town	79	(5)
1987–1989	Heart of Midlothian	56	(8)
1989–1996	Celtic	136	(8)
1995	→ Leicester City (loan)	5	(0)

International career
1991	Scotland	1	(0)
- * Club domestic league appearances and goals

Michael Galloway (30 May 1965 – May 2026) was a professional football player and coach. He played for Berwick Rangers, Mansfield Town, Halifax Town, Heart of Midlothian, Celtic and Leicester City. Galloway played as a defender but was equally comfortable playing in midfield and was often utilised in this position whilst at Celtic. Born in England, Galloway represented Scotland once in an international match.

== Playing career ==
Galloway was born in Oswestry on 30 May 1965. He started his career with Berwick Rangers. After spells at Mansfield Town and Halifax Town, he moved to Heart of Midlothian (Hearts) in the autumn of 1987. Galloway's performances for Hearts were a key reason why the Edinburgh side were able to push Celtic all the way during the 1987–88 season.

Celtic manager Billy McNeill signed Galloway in 1989. He made his competitive debut in a 3–1 win at old club Hearts on 12 August. He would be a regular feature in that first year with the club. Despite a weight problem and some inconsistent performances which saw him in and out of the team, he earned a Scotland cap in October 1991.

== Coaching career ==
On 27 April 2011, Galloway was appointed manager at East of Scotland League Club Coldstream FC for the 2011–12 season. On 15 June 2011, he was appointed manager at Northern Alliance League Club Berwick United for the 2011–12 season. On 22 September 2013, he was appointed manager of East of Scotland League side Eyemouth United.

== Death ==
On 20 May 2026, it was announced Galloway had died aged 60.

== See also ==
- List of Scotland international footballers born outside Scotland
