= Charlie Bell (footballer, born 1958) =

English footballer

Personal information
- Full name: Ian Charles Bell
- Date of birth: 14 November 1958 (age 67)
- Place of birth: Middlesbrough, England
- Position: Midfielder

Senior career*
Years	Team	Apps	(Gls)
1977–1981	Middlesbrough	10	(1)
1981–1983	Mansfield Town	84	(12)
- Scarborough
- Marske United
Total		94	(12)

Managerial career
- Marske United
- 2005–2008: Marske United
- * Club domestic league appearances and goals

Charlie Bell (born 14 November 1958) is an English former footballer who played in the Football League for Middlesbrough and Mansfield Town.

== Career ==
Born in Middlesbrough, Bell was an apprentice at his hometown club, signing for them as a senior player in 1977. However, after only ten league appearances in four years, he signed for Mansfield Town. He left Mansfield after two seasons, dropping into non-League football with Scarborough and becoming a policeman in Nottingham in April 1984.

In 1987 he joined Cleveland Police, playing for the work cricket and football team, as well as the England national police cricket and football teams. He subsequently became player-manager at Marske United. He left the club during the 2001–02 season to concentrate on his police career, but returned as manager in 2005. He left the club in January 2008.
