= Adrian Burrows =

English footballer

Personal information
- Full name: Adrian Mark Burrows
- Date of birth: 16 January 1959 (age 67)
- Place of birth: Sutton-in-Ashfield, England
- Height: 5 ft 11 in (1.80 m)
- Position: Centre back

Senior career*
Years	Team	Apps	(Gls)
1979–1982	Mansfield Town	78	(6)
1982–1984	Northampton Town	88	(4)
1984–1994	Plymouth Argyle	277	(14)
1987	→ Southend United (loan)	6	(0)
–	Saltash United	?	(?)
Total		449	(24)
- * Club domestic league appearances and goals

Adrian Mark Burrows (born 16 January 1959) is an English retired footballer who played as a centre back.

He began his career as an apprentice with Mansfield Town, and progressed through the club's youth system to make his first team debut in 1979. He made 78 league appearances over the next three years, scoring six goals, before moving to Northampton Town. After 88 league appearances in two years he wrote to Plymouth Argyle manager Johnny Hore to ask for a trial. He would spend the next ten years at Home Park, but he lost his place in the team after the arrival of Dave Smith as the club's manager. He spent time on loan with Southend United in 1987, making six appearances, but he turned down a permanent transfer because he was settled in Plymouth. He regained his place in the Argyle team and remained an important member of the squad for the next six years. His final appearance for the club came in May 1994 when the club took part in the Second Division play-offs. He was sent off in the second leg against Burnley and returned to the dressing room, where he broke down in tears. He finished his career in non-league football and became a driving instructor after retiring.
