= Noel Parkinson =

English footballer

Personal information
- Full name: Noel David Parkinson
- Date of birth: 16 November 1959 (age 67)
- Place of birth: Hull, England
- Height: 5 ft 8 in (1.73 m)
- Position: Midfielder

Youth career
- 1976–1979: Ipswich Town

Senior career*
Years	Team	Apps	(Gls)
1979–1980	Ipswich Town	0	(0)
1979	→ Bristol Rovers (loan)	5	(1)
1980	→ Brentford (loan)	10	(0)
1980–1982	Mansfield Town	70	(13)
1982–1984	Scunthorpe United	41	(7)
1984–1986	Colchester United	79	(13)
Total		205	(34)

International career
1976–1978	England Youth	4	(0)
- * Club domestic league appearances and goals

Noel David Parkinson (born 16 November 1959) is an English former footballer from Hull who played in the Football League as a midfielder, beginning his career at Ipswich Town, playing on loan at Bristol Rovers and Brentford and later permanently signing for Mansfield Town, Scunthorpe United and Colchester United. Alongside making over 200 Football League appearances, he also played for England youth between 1976 and 1978.

== Career ==
=== Ipswich Town ===
Born in Hull, Parkinson joined Ipswich Town as a trainee in 1976 after taking his A-level exams and went on to make 71 reserve team appearances for the club, scoring 18 goals. He made appearances for England at youth level during the 1976-77 season and the 1977–78 season. He made his first-team debut for Town in the UEFA Cup on 19 September 1979 in a 3–1 win at the Ullevaal Stadion against Skied Oslo, replacing Arnold Mühren after 76 minutes. His only other appearance for the club came in the return leg, a 7–0 thrashing with Parkinson coming on for George Burley in the 55th minute.

While with Ipswich, Parkinson was shipped out on loan on two occasions. The first of these was a month-long stint at Bristol Rovers in November 1979 where he scored once in five outings. In a similar loan deal, he was sent out to Brentford in February 1980 to help sustain their Third Division status under Bill Dodgin. He made ten appearances for the Bees in the league.

=== Mansfield Town ===
Parkinson signed for Mansfield Town in the summer of 1980 for a fee of £35,000. He established himself in the midfield and scored 13 goals in 70 games during the course of the two seasons he was with the club.

=== Scunthorpe United ===
In summer 1982, Parkinson moved slightly closer to home with a move to Scunthorpe United, signing for another £35,000 fee. He arrived at the club which in the 1981–82 season had finished 91st of 92 clubs in the Football League. He was attracted to player-manager John Duncan's way he wanted the team to play and was optimistic that "thing's couldn't get any worse". Moving to Scunthorpe also offered better financial security to Parkinson.

With the accumulation of a number of new players, including Steve Baines, Martin Fowler and Dennis Leman, the Iron put together a strong promotion push as they finished fourth in the Fourth Division and were promoted during Parkinson's first season with the club. However, he missed the final seven weeks of the season after sustaining a broken leg in training as his teammates clinched promotion to the Third Division. Complications to his recovery meant that he did not return to action for 13 months, resuming play in a 1–1 home draw with Sheffield United, but was unable to prevent the club slipping back to the Fourth Division. He completed his time with Scunthorpe having scored seven league goals in 41 games.

=== Colchester United ===
Following a brief trial with Blackpool in the summer of 1984, Parkinson was brought to Colchester United by ex-Ipswich player and coach Cyril Lea. He missed the first two games of the 1984–85 season but was ever-present in the remaining 44 league fixtures. In the league he played 79 games in total for Colchester, scoring 13 goals, after making his debut on 28 August 1984 in a 3–2 League Cup defeat at the hands of Gillingham, coming on for Jeff Hull. He scored the first of his 13 league goals in a 3–1 away victory at Northampton Town on 29 September 1984.

His career was ended following a double break and dislocation of his pelvis in a game against Wrexham. He ended with a total of 205 Football League appearances and 34 goals.

== Personal life ==
After his forced-retirement from playing, immediately after leaving Layer Road, Parkinson became a sports reporter on local radio in Humberside and was a photocopier salesman. He later became a car salesman and a managing director for online sales. He was made redundant from this position in 2004 but after investing his redundancy package, he launched the national car-buying website wewillbuyyourcar.com, a site which now turns over in excess of £20 million per year. In 2010, he was featured in the Sunday Times Rich List owing to the success of his company.
