= Jim Lumby =

English former footballer

Personal information
- Full name: James Anthony Lumby
- Date of birth: 2 October 1954 (age 72)
- Place of birth: Grimsby, England
- Height: 5 ft 9 in (1.75 m)
- Position: Forward

Senior career*
Years	Team	Apps	(Gls)
1973–1975	Grimsby Town	31	(12)
1975–1976	Boston United		
1976	Gainsborough Trinity		
1976–1977	Brigg Town		
1977–1978	Scunthorpe United	55	(29)
1978–1979	Carlisle United	27	(7)
1979–1981	Tranmere Rovers	46	(21)
1981–1982	Mansfield Town	51	(18)
- Boston United
Total		210	(87)
- * Club domestic league appearances and goals

Jim Lumby is an English former footballer who played as a forward in the Football League for Grimsby Town, Scunthorpe United, Carlisle United, Tranmere Rovers and Mansfield Town.
