= Les McJannet =

Scottish footballer and manager

Personal information
- Full name: William Leslie McJannet
- Date of birth: 2 August 1961 (age 65)
- Place of birth: Cumnock, Scotland
- Height: 5 ft 8 in (1.73 m)
- Position: Right back

Youth career
- –: Mansfield Town

Senior career*
Years	Team	Apps	(Gls)
1979–1982	Mansfield Town	74	(0)
1982–1984	King's Lynn		(0)
1984–1986	Burton Albion	101	(7)
1986–1987	Matlock Town		
1987–1989	Scarborough	34	(0)
1988–1992	Darlington	125	(6)
1992–1993	Boston United	5	(0)

Managerial career
- 2000–2006: Sutton Town
- 2006–2009: Glapwell
- 2010–2015: Carlton Town
- * Club domestic league appearances and goals

William Leslie McJannet (born 2 August 1961) is a Scottish former footballer who made 193 appearances in the Football League playing as a right back for Mansfield Town, Scarborough and Darlington between 1979 and 1992. He remained with Darlington for their 1989–90 Football Conference title-winning season, and also played non-league football for clubs including King's Lynn, Burton Albion, Matlock Town and Boston United.

He went on to manage in non-league football, taking charge of Sutton Town, Glapwell and Carlton Town.

== Honours ==
Darlington

- Football League Fourth Division: 1990–91
