= Dave Partridge =

English footballer

Personal information
- Full name: Brendan David Partridge
- Date of birth: 17 September 1941 (age 85)
- Place of birth: Manchester, England
- Position: Outside left

Senior career*
Years	Team	Apps	(Gls)
1960–1962	Stockport County	31	(6)
1962–1963	Darlington	3	(0)
1963–1966	King's Lynn		(29)
- * Club domestic league appearances and goals

Brendan David Partridge (born 17 September 1941) is an English former footballer who played as an outside left for Stockport County and Darlington of the Football League.

Partridge signed for Stockport County in November 1960. He made his senior debut on 11 February 1961, in a 1–0 defeat away to Southport, and finished the season with 11 appearances, all in the Fourth Division; he scored once, in a 3–2 defeat away to Aldershot. In 1961–62, he scored 5 goals from 20 league appearances, the last of which was away to Oldham Athletic in February 1962; he also played once in the League Cup. Partridge signed for another Fourth Division club, Darlington, but made only 4 appearances, 3 in the league, in the first few weeks of the 1962–63 season. Later that season he moved on to King's Lynn, where he spent three and a half seasons, scored 29 league goals, and helped them gain promotion to the Southern League Premier Division in 1963–64.
