= Stewart Barrowclough =

English footballer

Personal information
- Full name: Stewart James Barrowclough
- Date of birth: 29 October 1951 (age 75)
- Place of birth: Barnsley, England
- Position: Winger

Youth career
- Barnsley

Senior career*
Years	Team	Apps	(Gls)
1969–1970	Barnsley	9	(0)
1970–1978	Newcastle United	219	(21)
1978–1979	Birmingham City	29	(2)
1979–1981	Bristol Rovers	61	(14)
1981–1983	Barnsley	52	(1)
1983–1985	Mansfield Town	54	(10)
Total		424	(48)

International career
1972–1973	England U23	5	(1)
- * Club domestic league appearances and goals

Stewart James Barrowclough (born 29 October 1951) is an English footballer who played as a winger, notably for Newcastle United throughout the 1970s. He scored 48 goals from 424 appearances in the Football League.

== Career ==
A skilful and dynamic winger, Barrowclough began his career with his hometown club Barnsley and his performances from a handful of first-team appearances caught the eye of clubs in higher divisions. He joined Newcastle United in 1970, scoring on his debut against Burnley and became a key player down the wing for much of the decade. Whilst at Newcastle he picked up a League Cup losers medal following the Magpies 2–1 Wembley defeat to Manchester City. Barrowclough later played for Birmingham City and Bristol Rovers before returning to Barnsley, where he contributed to the club's early 80s resurgence. He finished his League career with Mansfield Town. He represented England at under-23 level.

== Personal life ==
His son Carl Barrowclough was also a professional footballer.

== Honours ==
Newcastle United

- Football League Cup runner-up: 1975–76
