= Tony Lowery (footballer) =

English footballer and manager

Personal information
- Full name: Anthony William Lowery
- Date of birth: 6 July 1961 (age 65)
- Place of birth: Wallsend, England
- Height: 5 ft 9 in (1.75 m)
- Position: Midfielder

Senior career*
Years	Team	Apps	(Gls)
–1981	Ashington		
1981–1983	West Bromwich Albion	1	(0)
1982	→ Walsall (loan)	6	(1)
1983–1991	Mansfield Town	252	(19)
1990	→ Walsall (loan)	6	(0)
1991	Carlisle United	7	(0)
1991–1993	Gateshead	15	(0)

Managerial career
- 1995–2012: Bedlington Terriers
- * Club domestic league appearances and goals

Anthony William Lowery (born 6 July 1961) is an English retired footballer who spent most of his professional career as a midfielder at Mansfield Town.

Lowery, a native of Wallsend, Northumberland, began his professional career in March 1981, when he was signed by West Bromwich Albion from non-league Ashington. However, he only played once for the Baggies, and also had a short loan spell at neighbours Walsall. In April 1983, he was allowed to join Mansfield Town on a free transfer, and he made his debut for the Stags on 7 May 1983 against Peterborough United.

Through the next five years, Lowery was almost ever-present in Mansfield's lineup, playing 40 or more league matches each season. He was noted for his work-rate and consistency in central midfield, and was a key member of the side that won promotion from Division Four in 1985-86, and won the Freight Rover Trophy in 1987.

By 1988-89, injuries had started to take their toll, and Lowery only played sporadically in his final seasons at Field Mill. In September 1990, he was loaned to Walsall for the second time in his career, and in the summer of 1991, Mansfield manager George Foster decided not to offer Lowery a new contract. When he left the club, Lowery had played 317 first-team games for Mansfield and scored 27 goals.

After leaving Mansfield, Lowery had a short spell at Carlisle United before returning to his native North East, where he joined non-league Gateshead, and later became assistant manager at Blyth Spartans. H was appointed manager of Bedlington Terriers in 1995 alongside Keith Perry and remained at the club until May 2012.

== Honours ==
Mansfield Town

- Associate Members' Cup: 1986–87
