= Paul Cannell =

English footballer

Personal information
- Full name: Paul Anthony Cannell
- Date of birth: 2 September 1953 (age 73)
- Place of birth: Newcastle upon Tyne, England
- Position: Forward

Youth career
- Sunderland
- Newcastle United

Senior career*
Years	Team	Apps	(Gls)
1973–1978	Newcastle United	49	(13)
1976	Washington Diplomats	21	(13)
1978–1979	Washington Diplomats	47	(24)
1979–1980	Memphis Rogues (indoor)		
1980	Memphis Rogues	28	(7)
1980–1981	Calgary Boomers (indoor)		
1980–1981	Detroit Express (indoor)	5	(1)
1981	Washington Diplomats	13	(1)
1981–1983	Mansfield Town	30	(4)
1983–1984	Berwick Rangers	14	(4)
Total		199	(67)
- * Club domestic league appearances and goals

Paul Anthony Cannell (born 2 September 1953) is an English former footballer, who played as a forward for Newcastle United between 1972 and 1978. He made 62 appearances and scored 18 goals, before moving to the United States. Cannell was a substitute for the 1976 League Cup Final, which Newcastle lost 2–1 to Manchester City.

== Early life ==
Paul Cannell was born in Newcastle upon Tyne to Tony and Olwen Cannell. As a child, he attended Heaton Grammar School.

== Career ==
Cannell began playing for Montague and North Fenham Boys Club while attending school and was approached by Charlie Ferguson, who was working for Sunderland as a scout, after scoring six times during a youth match. He began playing for the club's reserve sides but manager Alan Brown suggested that Cannell needed "toughening up" and arranged a loan spell with Whitley Bay in the Northern Football League.

After returning to Sunderland, Cannell continued to play for the club's youth and reserve side despite never signing a schoolboy contract at the club. However, prior to a match against Newcastle United, manager Brown approached Cannell to inform him that he would be required to sign forms to continue playing, although this was later revealed to be due to Newcastle's interest in signing Cannell. This came to light after the match when Cannell was approached by Newcastle manager Joe Harvey who visited his parents' home and offered him a deal with the club to be completed after he had sat his A-levels. He had been planning to attend Durham University to study law but was convinced by Harvey to change his mind who offered him £30 a week and commented "you'll always wonder if you could have been a professional footballer [...] Sign for us and if you don't make the grade you can always go back to university!"

External videos
- Cannell, playing in the US, shoulder charging the goalkeeper.

In his career, he played for Newcastle United and Mansfield Town in the Football League. In the North American Soccer League (NASL) he played for the Washington Diplomats for three different spells, and also for the Memphis Rogues. In the NASL's indoor league he played for Memphis, as well as the Calgary Boomers and Detroit Express Cannell helped the Rogues to the 1979–80 indoor Western Division title, and a spot in the finals. He was unable to play in the championship series versus Tampa Bay because of an ankle injury.

He later played in the Scottish Football League for Berwick Rangers, and North Shields.
