= Gary Nicholson (footballer) =

English footballer

Personal information
- Full name: Gary Anthony Nicholson
- Date of birth: 4 November 1960 (age 65)
- Place of birth: Hexham, Northumberland, England
- Height: 5 ft 5 in (1.65 m)
- Position: Winger

Youth career
- 1977–1978: Newcastle United

Senior career*
Years	Team	Apps	(Gls)
1978–1981	Newcastle United	12	(0)
1981–1984	Mansfield Town	118	(21)
1984–1985	York City	24	(4)
1985–1987	Halifax Town	59	(4)
1987–1988	Blyth Spartans		
1988–1989	Whitley Bay		
1989–	North Shields		
–1993	Guiseley		
1993–1994	Gateshead	3	(0)
1994–	RTM Newcastle		
Total		216	(29)
- * Club domestic league appearances and goals

Gary Anthony Nicholson (born 4 November 1960) is an English former professional footballer who played as a winger in the Football League for Newcastle United, Mansfield Town, York City and Halifax Town and in non-League football for Blyth Spartans, Whitley Bay, North Shields, Guiseley, Gateshead and RTM Newcastle.
