= David Caldwell (footballer, born 1960) =

Scottish footballer

Personal information
- Full name: David Wilson Caldwell
- Date of birth: 31 July 1960 (age 66)
- Place of birth: Aberdeen, Scotland
- Height: 5 ft 10 in (1.78 m)
- Position: Forward

Senior career*
Years	Team	Apps	(Gls)
1979–1985	Mansfield Town	157	(57)
1984–1985	→ Carlisle United (loan)	4	(0)
1985	→ Swindon Town (loan)	5	(0)
1985–1987	Chesterfield	68	(17)
1987–1988	Torquay United	24	(4)
1988–1990	KVV Overpelt		
1989–1990	→ Torquay United (loan)	17	(6)
1990–1992	Chesterfield	32	(4)
1992–1994	Caledonian		
2010–	Cardonald AC	2	(1)
- * Club domestic league appearances and goals

David Wilson Caldwell (born 31 July 1960) is a Scottish former professional footballer who played as a forward.

== Career ==
Caldwell began his career with Highland Football League club Inverness Caledonian FC. His goalscoring form in the Highland League led to a £25,000 move to Mansfield Town in June 1979.

He made his debut on 29 September 1979 in a 1–0 defeat against Reading at Elm Park, coming on as substitute after 76 minutes. Another substitute and one full appearance followed later that season. The following year saw Caldwell establish himself in the Mansfield side.

In December 1984, Caldwell asked for a transfer from Mansfield. Even though he was a regular in the side, he was sent on loan to Carlisle United within the same month. On returning to Field Mill 2 months later, he was immediately loaned to Swindon Town, but after a further month away he returned to Mansfield and sporadic appearances in the Mansfield side. His final game for the Stags came in 1985. It was no surprise that he moved on in the summer, joining Chesterfield for a fee of £12,000 after scoring 57 goals in 157 league games for the Stags.

He scored 17 times in 68 league games for Chesterfield before moving to Torquay United for £7,000 in November 1987. He scored with an overhead kick on his home debut against Hereford United after a headed pass from Gary Wright, and although sent off 3 more times that season (for which he received an 8 match ban) his ability to lead the attack made him an unlikely favourite of the crowd as Torquay made the play-offs and got further than usual in the cup competitions.

In August 1988 he left Plainmoor for Belgian side KVV Overpelt (costing £13,000) after 24 league games for the Gulls, scoring 4 times, but returned to Torquay on loan in December 1989. Following a spell playing in South Africa, in October 1990 he returned to Chesterfield, with a fee of £14,500 resembling a reasonable piece of business by the Belgian side. He played a further 32 league games, scoring 4 times for Chesterfield before a cartilage injury forced him to retire from league football.

On leaving Chesterfield in May 1992, he returned to the Highland League to play for Inverness Caledonian FC until 1994 when he moved to the Aberdeen Highland League Club, Cove Rangers F.C. Whilst playing for Cove Rangers he began working as a sales executive for an office equipment business. He continued this job, combining it with a part-time role as manager of Highland League club Lossiemouth F.C. between 1998 and 1999. Whilst his football management was successful, at the end of the season he was offered a job as group sales manager for Xerox Concessionaire in Edinburgh, which he took, leaving football behind him.

Now living in Glasgow, alongside coaching another side, Caldwell has made two substitute appearances for Cardonald AC, scoring the winning goal in his most recent outing.
