= Simon Woodhead =

English footballer (born 1962)

Personal information
- Full name: Simon Woodhead
- Date of birth: 26 December 1962 (age 63)
- Place of birth: Dewsbury, England
- Position: Defender

Senior career*
Years	Team	Apps	(Gls)
1980–1985	Mansfield Town	122	(6)
- Shepshed Charterhouse
- * Club domestic league appearances and goals

Simon Woodhead (born 26 December 1962) is an English former footballer who played in the Football League for Mansfield Town.
