= 1970–71 Mansfield Town F.C. season =

Mansfield Town
1970–71 season
- Manager: Jock Basford
- Stadium: Field Mill
- Third Division: 7th
- FA Cup: Second Round
- League Cup: Second Round

The 1970–71 season was Mansfield Town's 34th season in the Football League and 10th in the Third Division, they finished in 7th position with 51 points.

== Final league table ==
Pos	Team	Pld	W	D	L	GF	GA	GAv	Pts	Qualification or relegation
5	Chesterfield	46	17	17	12	66	38	1.737	51	
6	Bristol Rovers	46	19	13	14	69	50	1.380	51	
7	Mansfield Town	46	18	15	13	64	62	1.032	51	
8	Rotherham United	46	17	16	13	64	60	1.067	50	
9	Wrexham	46	18	13	15	72	65	1.108	49	Qualification for the Watney Cup

Rules for classification: 1) Points; 2) Goal average; 3) Goals scored

== Results ==
=== Football League Third Division ===
Match	Date	Opponent	Venue	Result	Attendance	Scorers
1	15 August 1970	Doncaster Rovers	A	2–1	8,147	Stenson, D Roberts
2	22 August 1970	Brighton & Hove Albion	H	1–0	8,119	Napier (o.g.)
3	28 August 1970	Shrewsbury Town	A	2–5	5,836	Partridge (2)
4	31 August 1970	Aston Villa	A	1–0	30,862	Partridge
5	4 September 1970	Plymouth Argyle	H	1–5	10,054	D Roberts
6	12 September 1970	Swansea City	A	4–2	7,408	Stenson (2), Jones, Williams (o.g.)
7	19 September 1970	Wrexham	H	1–1	7,185	Goodfellow
8	26 September 1970	Gillingham	A	2–2	4,706	Goodfellow, Jones
9	28 September 1970	Port Vale	H	2–0	8,121	Walker, D Roberts
10	3 October 1970	Rochdale	H	3–2	7,038	Stenson (2), Jones
11	10 October 1970	Preston North End	A	1–2	12,452	Stenson
12	14 October 1970	Walsall	H	2–2	6,912	Jones, Thompson
13	17 October 1970	Doncaster Rovers	H	2–1	6,912	Jones, D Roberts
14	20 October 1970	Bristol Rovers	A	0–2	12,307	
15	24 October 1970	Reading	H	0–0	6,310	
16	30 October 1970	Tranmere Rovers	A	1–4	3,194	Jones
17	7 November 1970	Halifax Town	H	3–2	5,549	Stenson, Boam, B Roberts
18	9 November 1970	Rotherham United	H	1–1	7,737	Stenson
19	14 November 1970	Torquay United	A	0–0	5,596	
20	28 November 1970	Bradford City	A	1–1	5,706	B Roberts
21	5 December 1970	Fulham	H	1–0	8,501	D Roberts
22	19 December 1970	Brighton & Hove Albion	A	0–2	6,524	
23	26 December 1970	Barnsley	H	1–2	5,939	Thompson
24	2 January 1971	Chesterfield	A	2–2	16,474	D Roberts (2)
25	9 January 1971	Port Vale	A	0–2	4,412	
26	16 January 1971	Bristol Rovers	H	4–1	6,355	Thompson (2), D Roberts, Parsons (o.g.)
27	23 January 1971	Bury	A	0–0	3,585	
28	30 January 1971	Bradford City	H	5–3	4,360	Walker, D Roberts, Jones
29	6 February 1971	Fulham	A	0–0	9,373	
30	13 February 1971	Bury	H	1–0	4,631	Stenson
31	20 February 1971	Rotherham United	A	1–2	7,650	D Roberts
32	27 February 1971	Tranmere Rovers	H	6–2	4,326	D Roberts (4), Thompson, Stenson
33	6 March 1971	Reading	A	0–1	4,508	
34	9 March 1971	Walsall	A	1–0	3,364	Stenson
35	13 March 1971	Torquay United	H	0–0	5,710	
36	15 March 1971	Chesterfield	H	2–2	13,181	Stenson, Jones
37	20 March 1971	Halifax Town	A	1–0	6,667	D Roberts
38	27 March 1971	Plymouth Argyle	A	0–0	8,925	
39	3 April 1971	Shrewsbury Town	H	1–1	4,289	Jones
40	10 April 1971	Barnsley	A	0–1	5,292	
41	12 April 1971	Rochdale	A	1–1	3,898	D Roberts
42	13 April 1971	Swansea City	H	2–0	5,400	D Roberts (2)
43	17 April 1971	Preston North End	H	3–1	7,185	D Roberts (2), Thompson
44	24 April 1971	Wrexham	A	0–4	5,271	
45	26 April 1971	Aston Villa	H	2–0	9,655	D Roberts, Thompson
46	1 May 1971	Gillingham	H	2–0	4,251	D Roberts, Thompson

=== FA Cup ===
Round	Date	Opponent	Venue	Result	Attendance	Scorers
R1	21 November 1970	Wrexham	H	2–0	6,825	D Roberts, Stenson
R2	12 December 1970	Scunthorpe United	A	0–3	7,656	

=== League Cup ===
Round	Date	Opponent	Venue	Result	Attendance	Scorers
R1	19 August 1970	Chesterfield	H	6–2	11,092	Stenson (2), D Roberts, Partridge (3)
R2	8 September 1970	Liverpool	H	0–0	12,559	
R2 Replay	22 September 1970	Liverpool	A	2–3	31,087	Stenson, Sutton

== Squad statistics ==
- Squad list sourced from 1970–71 Mansfield Town F.C. season at the English National Football Archive (subscription required)

Pos.	Name	League		FA Cup		League Cup		Total	
Pos.	Name	Apps	Goals	Apps	Goals	Apps	Goals	Apps	Goals
GK	(England) Rod Arnold	17	0	0	0	0	0	17	0
GK	(England) Graham Brown	19	0	1	0	2	0	22	0
GK	(England) Des Finch	2	0	1	0	0	0	3	0
GK	(Scotland) Jim Herriot	5	0	0	0	0	0	5	0
GK	(England) Mick Rose	3	0	0	0	1	0	4	0
DF	(England) Stuart Boam	38	1	2	0	1	0	41	1
DF	(Scotland) Sandy Pate	46	0	2	0	3	0	51	0
DF	(England) John Saunders	29	0	0	0	2	0	31	0
DF	(England) Clive Walker	46	2	2	0	3	0	51	2
DF	(England) Phil Waller	34(3)	0	2	0	3	0	39(3)	0
MF	(Scotland) Jimmy Goodfellow	15(4)	2	2	0	1	0	18(4)	2
MF	(Wales) Alan Jarvis	12	0	0	0	0	0	12	0
MF	(England) Johnny Quigley	16	0	0	0	3	0	19	0
MF	(England) Bobby Roberts	39	2	2	0	0	0	41	2
MF	(England) John Stenson	45	12	2	1	3	3	50	16
MF	(Scotland) Jimmy Sutton	11(2)	0	2	0	3	1	16(2)	1
FW	(England) John Bingham	4(1)	0	0	0	0	0	4(1)	0
FW	(England) Jantzen Derrick	2(1)	0	0	0	0	0	2(1)	0
FW	(Wales) Dai Jones	39(2)	9	0(1)	0	3	0	42(3)	9
FW	(England) Malcolm Partridge	5	3	0	0	2	3	7	6
FW	(England) Dudley Roberts	45	22	2	1	3	1	50	24
FW	(England) Dave Thompson	34	8	2	0	0	0	36	8
–	Own goals	–	3	–	0	–	0	–	3
