= 1969–70 Mansfield Town F.C. season =

Mansfield Town
1969–70 season
- Manager: Tommy Eggleston
- Stadium: Field Mill
- Third Division: 6th
- FA Cup: Fifth round
- League Cup: Second round

The 1969–70 season was Mansfield Town's 33rd season in the Football League and 9th in the Third Division, they finished in 6th position with 53 points.

== Final league table ==
Pos	Team	Pld	W	D	L	GF	GA	GAv	Pts	Promotion or relegation
4	Fulham	46	20	15	11	81	55	1.473	55	Qualified for the Watney Cup (Note: The two teams who scored the most goals in each division, and did not qualify for Europe and were not promoted, qualified for the Watney Cup.)
5	Brighton & Hove Albion	46	23	9	14	57	43	1.326	55	
6	Mansfield Town	46	21	11	14	70	49	1.429	53	
7	Barnsley	46	19	15	12	68	59	1.153	53	
8	Reading	46	21	11	14	87	77	1.130	53	Qualified for the Watney Cup

== Results ==
=== Football League Third Division ===
Match	Date	Opponent	Venue	Result	Attendance	Scorers
1	9 August 1969	Gillingham	H	1–0	6,034	Partridge
2	16 August 1969	Doncaster Rovers	A	0–2	10,960	
3	23 August 1969	Walsall	H	0–0	6,695	
4	26 August 1969	Rotherham United	A	2–2	6,504	Stenson, Roberts
5	30 August 1969	Orient	A	0–1	6,018	
6	6 September 1969	Bradford City	H	2–1	6,885	Goodfellow, Ledger
7	13 September 1969	Barrow	A	1–0	4,775	Sharkey
8	15 September 1969	Brighton & Hove Albion	H	1–0	6,306	Ledger
9	20 September 1969	Bristol Rovers	H	1–1	6,854	Sharkey
10	27 September 1969	Shrewsbury Town	A	0–0	3,801	
11	30 September 1969	Bury	A	0–1	3,302	
12	4 October 1969	Plymouth Argyle	H	1–2	6,433	Sullivan (o.g.)
13	6 October 1969	Doncaster Rovers	H	1–2	9,452	Roberts
14	11 October 1969	Stockport County	A	3–1	4,039	Roberts, Jones (2)
15	18 October 1969	Reading	H	2–1	5,373	Boam, Jones
16	25 October 1969	Halifax Town	A	2–1	3,751	Keeley, Jones
17	1 November 1969	Tranmere Rovers	H	1–2	5,965	Bates
18	3 November 1969	Rochdale	H	1–2	4,588	Bates
19	8 November 1969	Southport	A	1–0	2,088	Stenson
20	22 November 1969	Fulham	A	1–1	8,088	Stenson
21	24 November 1969	Rochdale	A	1–2	6,833	Roberts
22	13 December 1969	Barrow	H	4–2	5,068	Roberts (2), Bates, Goodfellow
23	26 December 1969	Walsall	A	0–1	7,499	
24	27 December 1969	Orient	H	4–1	7,828	Stenson, Roberts (2), Allen (o.g.)
25	10 January 1970	Bristol Rovers	A	1–4	5,978	Roberts
26	17 January 1970	Shrewsbury Town	H	2–0	6,218	Jones, Stenson
27	31 January 1970	Plymouth Argyle	A	0–1	9,181	
28	21 February 1970	Halifax Town	H	3–3	6,152	Goodfellow, Partridge (2)
29	23 February 1970	Bury	H	3–1	7,043	Goodfellow, Partridge, Jones
30	28 February 1970	Tranmere Rovers	A	1–1	2,955	Jones
31	4 March 1970	Torquay United	A	2–0	4,421	Partridge, Walker
32	9 March 1970	Barnsley	H	2–0	7,936	Roberts, Sherratt (o.g.)
33	14 March 1970	Luton Town	A	2–2	12,690	Roberts, Partridge
34	16 March 1970	Bournemouth & Boscombe Athletic	H	2–0	8,223	Jones, Partridge
35	21 March 1970	Torquay United	H	2–0	6,605	Roberts, Partridge
36	23 March 1970	Stockport County	H	4–1	7,824	Roberts, Partridge (2), Stenson
37	28 March 1970	Barnsley	A	1–1	8,978	Stenson
38	30 March 1970	Reading	A	0–1	8,923	
39	1 April 1970	Southport	H	5–0	7,009	Roberts (2), McKenzie (3)
40	4 April 1970	Rotherham United	H	2–0	9,166	Partridge, McKenzie
41	6 April 1970	Fulham	H	2–3	10,322	Partridge, Jones
42	10 April 1970	Gillingham	A	3–3	3,993	Partridge, Jones, Roberts
43	15 April 1970	Brighton & Hove Albion	A	2–1	10,284	Goodfellow, Roberts
44	18 April 1970	Bournemouth & Boscombe Athletic	A	0–1	4,673	
45	20 April 1970	Luton Town	H	0–0	10,301	
46	22 April 1970	Bradford City	A	1–0	4,418	Goodfellow

=== FA Cup ===
Round	Date	Opponent	Venue	Result	Attendance	Scorers
R1	15 November 1969	Bury	A	2–2	4,336	Keeley, Stenson
R1 Replay	19 November 1969	Bury	H	2–0	6,766	Bates, Partridge
R2	6 December 1969	Shrewsbury Town	A	2–1	5,661	Keeley, Roberts
R3	3 January 1970	Barnsley	H	3–1	14,387	Goodfellow, Partridge, Waller
R4	24 January 1970	Blackpool	A	2–0	23,715	Jones (2)
R5	7 February 1970	Leeds United	A	0–2	48,093	

=== League Cup ===
Round	Date	Opponent	Venue	Result	Attendance	Scorers
R1	13 August 1969	Notts County	H	3–1	6,727	Bates, Waller, Jones (o.g.)
R2	3 September 1969	Queens Park Rangers	H	2–2	10,256	Goodfellow, Ledger
R2 Replay	9 September 1969	Queens Park Rangers	A	0–4	17,315	

== Squad statistics ==
- Squad list sourced from 1969–70 Mansfield Town F.C. season at the English National Football Archive (subscription required)

Pos.	Name	League		FA Cup		League Cup		Total	
Pos.	Name	Apps	Goals	Apps	Goals	Apps	Goals	Apps	Goals
GK	(England) Graham Brown	33	0	2	0	2	0	37	0
GK	(England) Dave Hollins	13	0	4	0	1	0	18	0
DF	(England) Stuart Boam	46	1	6	0	3	0	55	1
DF	(England) Mick Hopkinson	2	0	0(1)	0	1	0	3(1)	0
DF	(Scotland) Sandy Pate	46	0	6	0	3	0	55	0
DF	(England) John Saunders	3	0	0	0	1	0	4	0
DF	(England) Clive Walker	45	1	6	0	3	0	54	1
DF	(England) Phil Waller	39	0	6	1	3	1	48	2
MF	(Scotland) Jimmy Goodfellow	30	6	4	1	2	1	36	8
MF	(England) Johnny Quigley	43	0	6	0	0	0	49	0
MF	(England) John Stenson	39(1)	7	5	1	3	0	47(1)	8
FW	(England) Brian Bates	20	3	3	1	1	1	24	5
FW	(Wales) Dai Jones	31(3)	10	4(1)	2	0	0	35(3)	12
FW	(England) Ray Keeley	11(1)	1	3(1)	2	1	0	15(2)	3
FW	(England) Bob Ledger	2(3)	2	0	0	1	1	3(3)	3
FW	(England) Duncan McKenzie	7(3)	3	0	0	0	0	7(3)	3
FW	(England) Malcolm Partridge	39	13	5(1)	2	3	0	47(1)	15
FW	(England) Dudley Roberts	43	18	6	1	2	0	51	19
FW	(England) Nick Sharkey	14(1)	2	0	0	3	0	17(1)	2
–	Own goals	–	3	–	0	–	1	–	4
