= 1971–72 Mansfield Town F.C. season =

Mansfield Town
1971–72 season
- Manager: Jock Basford; Danny Williams
- Stadium: Field Mill
- Third Division: 21st
- FA Cup: Second Round
- League Cup: First Round

The 1971–72 season was Mansfield Town's 35th season in the Football League and 11th in the Third Division, they finished in 21st position with 36 points and were relegated to the Fourth Division on goal average.

== Final league table ==
Pos	Team	Pld	W	D	L	GF	GA	GAv	Pts	Qualification or relegation
19	York City	46	12	12	22	57	66	0.864	36	
20	Tranmere Rovers	46	10	16	20	50	71	0.704	36	
21	Mansfield Town (R)	46	8	20	18	41	63	0.651	36	Relegation to the Fourth Division
22	Barnsley (R)	46	9	18	19	32	64	0.500	36	Relegation to the Fourth Division
23	Torquay United (R)	46	10	12	24	41	69	0.594	32	Relegation to the Fourth Division

Rules for classification: 1) Points; 2) Goal average; 3) Goals scored
(R) Relegated

== Results ==
=== Football League Third Division ===
Match	Date	Opponent	Venue	Result	Attendance	Scorers
1	15 August 1971	Halifax Town	H	0–0	5,865	
2	21 August 1971	Rochdale	A	1–2	3,554	Ryder (o.g.)
3	28 August 1971	Brighton & Hove Albion	H	0–3	4,104	
4	4 September 1971	Plymouth Argyle	A	1–3	8,343	Stenson
5	11 September 1971	Swansea City	H	0–2	3,549	
6	18 September 1971	Chesterfield	A	0–2	9,960	
7	22 September 1971	Aston Villa	A	1–0	28,112	Jones
8	25 September 1971	Rotherham United	H	0–1	4,799	
9	27 September 1971	Tranmere Rovers	A	2–2	2,455	Thompson, Fairbrother
10	2 October 1971	Bolton Wanderers	A	0–2	9,030	
11	9 October 1971	Bristol Rovers	H	0–0	3,836	
12	16 October 1971	Halifax Town	A	1–1	3,864	Fairbrother
13	18 October 1971	Barnsley	H	0–0	3,696	
14	23 October 1971	Blackburn Rovers	A	1–1	7,103	Fairbrother
15	29 October 1971	Bournemouth	H	0–5	6,622	
16	6 November 1971	Notts County	A	0–2	16,905	
17	13 November 1971	Port Vale	H	0–1	5,996	
18	27 November 1971	York City	A	2–1	4,328	Wignall, B Roberts
19	4 December 1971	Torquay United	H	0–0	5,145	
20	18 December 1971	Plymouth Argyle	H	2–3	3,784	Fairbrother, Thompson
21	27 December 1971	Walsall	A	1–2	7,001	Thompson
22	1 January 1972	Chesterfield	H	2–1	8,331	Fairbrother, Wignall
23	8 January 1972	Brighton & Hove Albion	A	0–1	10,916	
24	15 January 1972	Bradford City	A	2–2	4,098	Fairbrother (2)
25	22 January 1972	Tranmere Rovers	H	1–1	4,752	Fairbrother
26	29 January 1972	Barnsley	A	1–1	3,924	Thompson
27	5 February 1972	Oldham Athletic	H	2–1	4,497	Fairbrother, Wignall
28	12 February 1972	Blackburn Rovers	H	1–0	5,155	Wignall
29	19 February 1972	Bournemouth	A	1–1	13,417	Kitchener (o.g.)
30	26 February 1972	Notts County	H	1–1	16,784	B Roberts
31	4 March 1972	Port Vale	H	0–1	2,809	
32	11 March 1972	Bristol Rovers	A	1–2	5,581	Fairbrother
33	13 March 1972	Wrexham	A	1–1	2,547	Saunders
34	18 March 1972	Rochdale	H	3–1	5,121	Saunders, Fairbrother, Wignall
35	20 March 1972	Shrewsbury Town	H	2–2	6,076	Fairbrother, D Roberts
36	24 March 1972	Swansea City	A	1–1	3,494	Wignall
37	27 March 1972	Bolton Wanderers	H	1–0	5,412	Wignall
38	1 April 1972	Walsall	H	1–1	5,782	Fairbrother
39	3 April 1972	Rotherham United	A	1–3	5,906	Fairbrother
40	8 April 1972	Oldham Athletic	A	1–2	5,587	Wignall
41	15 April 1972	York City	H	0–0	5,018	
42	19 April 1972	Shrewsbury Town	A	2–4	2,693	Fairbrother (2)
43	22 April 1972	Torquay United	A	1–0	3,929	Longhorn
44	24 April 1972	Aston Villa	H	1–1	12,476	Fairbrother
45	29 April 1972	Bradford City	H	1–1	4,242	Stenson
46	1 May 1972	Wrexham	H	1–1	6,688	Fairbrother

=== FA Cup ===
Round	Date	Opponent	Venue	Result	Attendance	Scorers
R1	20 November 1971	Chester	A	1–1	3,669	Bingham
R1 Replay	22 November 1971	Chester	H	4–3	5,310	Bingham, Fairbrother, Thompson, B Roberts
R2	11 December 1971	Tranmere Rovers	H	2–2	5,634	Fairbrother, Thompson
R2 Replay	15 December 1971	Tranmere Rovers	A	2–4	5,703	Fairbrother (2)

=== League Cup ===
Round	Date	Opponent	Venue	Result	Attendance	Scorers
R1	18 August 1971	Chesterfield	A	0–0	12,261	
R1 Replay	23 August 1971	Chesterfield	H	0–5	9,219	

== Squad statistics ==
- Squad list sourced from 1971–72 Mansfield Town F.C. season at the English National Football Archive (subscription required)

Pos.	Name	League		FA Cup		League Cup		Total	
Pos.	Name	Apps	Goals	Apps	Goals	Apps	Goals	Apps	Goals
GK	(England) Kim Book	4	0	0	0	0	0	4	0
GK	(England) Graham Brown	40	0	4	0	2	0	46	0
GK	(Scotland) Graeme Crawford	2	0	0	0	0	0	2	0
DF	(England) Sam Ellis	20	0	0	0	0	0	20	0
DF	(England) Barry Foster	9	0	0	0	0	0	9	0
DF	(England) Colin Foster	1	0	0	0	0	0	1	0
DF	(England) Ray Harford	7	0	0	0	2	0	9	0
DF	(England) John Haselden	4	0	0	0	0	0	4	0
DF	(Scotland) Sandy Pate	46	0	4	0	2	0	52	0
DF	(England) John Saunders	44	2	4	0	0	0	48	2
DF	(England) Clive Walker	41	0	4	0	2	0	47	0
DF	(England) Phil Waller	21(3)	0	4	0	2	0	27(3)	0
MF	(Wales) Alan Jarvis	40(2)	0	4	0	2	0	46(2)	0
MF	(England) Dennis Longhorn	26(1)	1	0	0	0	0	26(1)	1
MF	(England) Bobby Roberts	37(4)	2	3	1	2	0	42(4)	3
MF	(England) John Stenson	19(3)	2	2(1)	0	1	0	22(4)	2
FW	(England) John Bingham	14(2)	0	3(1)	2	1	0	18(3)	2
FW	(England) John Fairbrother	41	18	4	4	0	0	45	22
FW	(England) Colin Harrington	7(6)	0	1	0	2	0	10(6)	0
FW	(Wales) Dai Jones	5(5)	1	0	0	0	0	5(5)	1
FW	(England) Dudley Roberts	15(1)	1	1	0	2	0	18(1)	1
FW	(England) Dave Thompson	40	4	4	2	2	0	46	6
FW	(England) Frank Wignall	23(2)	8	2	0	0	0	25(2)	8
–	Own goals	–	2	–	0	–	0	–	2
