= 1968–69 Mansfield Town F.C. season =

Mansfield Town
1968–69 season
- Manager: Tommy Eggleston
- Stadium: Field Mill
- Third Division: 15th
- FA Cup: Quarter Final
- League Cup: First Round

The 1968–69 season was Mansfield Town's 32nd season in the Football League and 8th in the Third Division, they finished in 15th position with 43 points.

== Final league table ==
Pos	Team	Pld	W	D	L	GF	GA	GAv	Pts
13	Walsall	46	14	16	16	50	49	1.020	44
14	Reading	46	15	13	18	67	66	1.015	43
15	Mansfield Town	46	16	11	19	58	62	0.935	43
16	Bristol Rovers	46	16	11	19	63	71	0.887	43
17	Shrewsbury Town	46	16	11	19	51	67	0.761	43

Source: rsssf.com
Rules for classification: 1) points; 2) goal average; 3) number of goals scored.

== Results ==
=== Football League Third Division ===
Match	Date	Opponent	Venue	Result	Attendance	Scorers
1	10 August 1968	Brighton & Hove Albion	A	2–1	10,091	Sharkey (2)
2	17 August 1968	Torquay United	H	2–1	6,486	Goodfellow, Melling
3	24 August 1968	Orient	A	0–1	7,087	
4	26 August 1968	Southport	H	3–1	7,708	Melling, Goodfellow, Ledger
5	31 August 1968	Tranmere Rovers	H	1–1	7,181	Jones
6	7 September 1968	Oldham Athletic	H	4–0	6,718	Ledger (2), Goodfellow, Roberts
7	14 September 1968	Barrow	A	0–3	4,742	
8	18 September 1968	Luton Town	A	2–4	19,351	Jones, Partridge
9	21 September 1968	Rotherham United	H	0–1	10,033	
10	28 September 1968	Gillingham	A	1–1	4,650	Sharkey
11	4 October 1968	Hartlepool	A	1–1	5,776	Quigley
12	7 October 1968	Southport	A	2–3	3,730	Keeley (2)
13	12 October 1968	Bournemouth & Boscombe Athletic	H	3–1	5,093	Jones, Ledger (2)
14	18 October 1968	Crewe Alexandra	A	1–2	4,273	Jones
15	26 October 1968	Bristol Rovers	H	0–0	5,068	
16	2 November 1968	Reading	A	1–2	5,677	Partridge
17	6 November 1968	Plymouth Argyle	A	0–1	6,603	
18	9 November 1968	Northampton Town	H	0–2	4,635	
19	23 November 1968	Swindon Town	H	2–0	5,477	Ledger, Roberts
20	30 November 1968	Shrewsbury Town	A	1–1	2,694	Roberts
21	14 December 1968	Bournemouth & Boscombe Athletic	A	1–2	6,347	Ledger
22	21 December 1968	Crewe Alexandra	A	1–2	6,347	Ledger
23	26 December 1968	Hartlepool	H	2–0	6,683	Ledger, Roberts
24	11 January 1969	Reading	A	1–1	6,935	Sharkey
25	18 January 1969	Northampton Town	A	0–0	5,840	
26	1 February 1969	Stockport County	H	0–0	13,291	
27	22 February 1969	Watford	A	1–2	13,347	Roberts
28	1 March 1969	Brighton & Hove Albion	H	3–1	13,121	Sharkey, Hopkinson, Wilkinson (o.g.)
29	10 March 1969	Stockport County	A	1–1	5,827	Sharkey
30	15 March 1969	Orient	H	0–2	5,463	
31	21 March 1969	Tranmere Rovers	A	1–2	3,829	Quigley
32	25 March 1969	Bristol Rovers	A	2–6	5,421	Partridge, Goodfellow
33	28 March 1969	Oldham Athletic	A	2–2	4,037	Keeley, Roberts
34	1 April 1969	Walsall	A	1–3	5,282	Sharkey
35	5 April 1969	Gillingham	H	2–0	4,959	Sharkey, Roberts
36	7 April 1969	Luton Town	H	1–0	8,681	Sharkey
37	8 April 1969	Barnsley	A	0–2	8,344	
38	12 April 1969	Rotherham United	A	0–3	6,960	
39	14 April 1969	Barnsley	H	0–0	6,190	
40	19 April 1969	Barrow	H	4–2	5,167	Sharkey, Roberts (2), Goodfellow
41	22 April 1969	Swindon Town	A	0–1	21,247	
42	25 April 1969	Walsall	H	2–1	5,863	Sharkey, Waller
43	28 April 1969	Plymouth Argyle	H	1–0	6,744	Goodfellow
44	30 April 1969	Torquay United	A	1–0	5,802	Boam
45	5 May 1969	Watford	H	3–0	8,574	Sharkey (2), Eddy (o.g.)
46	9 May 1969	Shrewsbury Town	A	1–2	5,761	Roberts

=== FA Cup ===
Round	Date	Opponent	Venue	Result	Attendance	Scorers
R1	16 November 1968	Tow Law Town	H	4–1	6,361	Ledger (2), Keeley, Sharkey
R2	7 December 1968	Rotherham United	A	2–2	10,379	Keeley, Sharkey
R2 Replay	9 December 1968	Rotherham United	H	1–0	12,876	Ledger
R3	4 January 1969	Sheffield United	H	2–1	17,430	Roberts (2)
R4	25 January 1969	Southend United	H	2–1	16,160	Roberts, Sharkey
R5	26 February 1969	West Ham United	H	3–0	21,117	Roberts, Sharkey, Keeley
QF	8 March 1969	Leicester City	H	0–1	23,500	

=== League Cup ===
Round	Date	Opponent	Venue	Result	Attendance	Scorers
R1	14 August 1968	Lincoln City	A	1–2	8,440	Keeley

== Squad statistics ==
- Squad list sourced from 1968–69 Mansfield Town F.C. season at the English National Football Archive (subscription required)

Pos.	Name	League		FA Cup		League Cup		Total	
Pos.	Name	Apps	Goals	Apps	Goals	Apps	Goals	Apps	Goals
GK	(England) Des Finch	2	0	0	0	0	0	2	0
GK	(England) Dave Hollins	44	0	7	0	1	0	52	0
DF	(England) Stuart Boam	46	1	7	0	1	0	54	1
DF	(England) Mick Hopkinson	44	1	7	0	1	0	52	1
DF	(Scotland) Sandy Pate	39	0	7	0	1	0	47	0
DF	(England) Phil Waller	45	1	7	0	1	0	53	1
MF	(England) Roger Frude	2(1)	0	0	0	0	0	2(1)	0
MF	(Scotland) Jimmy Goodfellow	38	6	7	0	1	0	46	6
MF	(England) Johnny Quigley	46	2	7	0	1	0	54	2
MF	(England) Mickey Walker	2	0	0	0	0	0	2	0
FW	(Wales) Dai Jones	20(4)	4	0(1)	0	0	0	20(5)	4
FW	(England) Ray Keeley	37(3)	4	7	3	1	1	45(3)	8
FW	(England) Bob Ledger	34(1)	9	7	3	0	0	41(1)	12
FW	(England) Terry Melling	6	2	0	0	1	0	7	2
FW	(England) Malcolm Partridge	16(2)	3	0	0	1	0	17(2)	3
FW	(England) Dudley Roberts	42	10	7	4	0(1)	0	49(1)	14
FW	(England) Nick Sharkey	40(1)	13	7	4	1	0	48(1)	17
FW	(England) Bob Todd	3(1)	0	0	0	0	0	3(1)	0
–	Own goals	–	2	–	0	–	0	–	2
