= 1972–73 Mansfield Town F.C. season =

Mansfield Town
1972–73 season
- Manager: Danny Williams
- Stadium: Field Mill
- Fourth Division: 6th
- FA Cup: First Round
- League Cup: Second Round
Home colours

The 1972–73 season was Mansfield Town's 36th season in the Football League and 4th in the Fourth Division, they finished in 6th position with 54 points.

== Final league table ==
Pos	Team	Pld	W	D	L	GF	GA	GAv	Pts	Promotion or relegation
4	Aldershot (P)	46	22	12	12	60	38	1.579	56	Promotion to the Third Division
5	Newport County	46	22	12	12	64	44	1.455	56	
6	Mansfield Town	46	20	14	12	78	51	1.529	54	Qualified for the Watney Cup (Note: The two teams who scored the most goals in each division, and did not qualify for Europe and were not promoted, qualified for the Watney Cup.)
7	Reading	46	17	18	11	51	38	1.342	52	
8	Exeter City	46	18	14	14	57	51	1.118	50	

Source: rsssf.com
(P) Promoted

== Results ==
=== Football League Fourth Division ===
Match	Date	Opponent	Venue	Result	Attendance	Scorers
1	12 August 1972	Northampton Town	H	1–0	4,303	Wignall
2	19 August 1972	Doncaster Rovers	A	1–0	3,540	Fairbrother
3	26 August 1972	Exeter City	H	3–0	4,172	Ellis (2), McCaffrey
4	30 August 1972	Cambridge United	H	3–1	5,216	Walker, Fairbrother, Longhorn
5	2 September 1972	Newport County	A	1–0	4,833	Fairbrother
6	9 September 1972	Bury	H	1–1	4,836	Fairbrother
7	16 September 1972	Aldershot	A	1–0	4,808	Thompson
8	18 September 1972	Gillingham	H	2–0	5,399	Fairbrother, Wignall
9	23 September 1972	Barnsley	H	3–1	5,997	Fairbrother (2), McCaffrey
10	25 September 1972	Stockport County	A	1–2	4,543	Thompson
11	30 September 1972	Darlington	A	3–2	1,604	Fairbrother, Longhorn, Wignall
12	7 October 1972	Southport	H	3–3	7,312	Fairbrother, Bentley, Wignall
13	9 October 1972	Peterborough United	H	4–2	5,379	Fairbrother (3), Walker
14	14 October 1972	Bradford City	A	1–1	3,383	Roberts
15	21 October 1972	Chester	H	4–1	5,787	Fairbrother (2), Laverick, McCaffrey
16	25 October 1972	Hereford United	A	1–3	10,092	Wignall
17	28 October 1972	Colchester United	A	1–1	3,842	Ellis
18	4 November 1972	Stockport County	H	1–0	5,114	Walker
19	11 November 1972	Gillingham	A	1–2	2,766	Bird
20	25 November 1972	Lincoln City	A	1–1	6,657	Fairbrother
21	2 December 1972	Reading	H	1–1	4,505	Cottam
22	9 December 1972	Workington	A	0–2	1,234	
23	16 December 1972	Crewe Alexandra	A	4–0	2,439	Roberts, Thompson, Ellis, Fairbrother
24	23 December 1972	Hartlepool	H	2–0	4,208	Fairbrother, McCaffrey
25	26 December 1972	Barnsley	A	1–1	5,900	Matthews
26	30 December 1972	Doncaster Rovers	H	0–0	5,187	
27	6 January 1972	Exeter City	A	2–4	6,744	Thompson, Fairbrother
28	13 January 1972	Hereford United	H	1–1	5,530	Ellis
29	27 January 1972	Bury	A	0–1	3,068	
30	3 February 1972	Peterborough United	A	0–1	7,224	
31	10 February 1972	Aldershot	H	2–0	4,289	Wignall, Bird
32	16 February 1972	Northampton Town	A	0–1	2,288	
33	24 February 1972	Crewe Alexandra	H	5–1	3,665	Ellis, Fairbrother, Wignall, McKenzie, Thompson
34	2 March 1972	Southport	A	1–3	5,656	McKenzie
35	5 March 1972	Workington	H	4–0	4,548	McKenzie (2), Thompson, Geidmintis (o.g.)
36	10 March 1972	Bradford City	H	4–1	5,300	McKenzie (3), Fairbrother
37	17 March 1972	Chester	A	2–2	2,114	Laverick, Matthewson (o.g.)
38	21 March 1972	Torquay United	A	1–1	2,704	Roberts
39	24 March 1972	Colchester United	H	1–1	4,666	Ellis
40	26 March 1972	Newport County	H	0–0	6,402	
41	31 March 1972	Lincoln City	H	0–2	5,277	
42	7 April 1972	Reading	A	0–2	7,102	
43	14 April 1972	Torquay United	H	2–1	3,451	Roberts, McCaffrey
44	20 April 1972	Hartlepool	A	1–1	2,855	Thompson
45	24 April 1972	Darlington	H	5–0	5,131	Roberts (3), Thompson, McCaffrey
46	28 April 1972	Cambridge United	A	2–3	11,542	Roberts, McCaffrey

=== FA Cup ===
Round	Date	Opponent	Venue	Result	Attendance	Scorers
R1	18 November 1972	York City	A	1–2	4,316	Fairbrother

=== League Cup ===
Round	Date	Opponent	Venue	Result	Attendance	Scorers
R1	16 August 1972	Lincoln City	H	3–1	4,642	Pate, Laverick, Longhorn
R2	5 September 1972	Charlton Athletic	A	3–4	5,218	McCaffrey, Walker, Wignall

== Squad statistics ==
- Squad list sourced from 1972–73 Mansfield Town F.C. season at the English National Football Archive (subscription required)

Pos.	Name	League		FA Cup		League Cup		Total	
Pos.	Name	Apps	Goals	Apps	Goals	Apps	Goals	Apps	Goals
GK	(England) Rod Arnold	13	0	0	0	0	0	13	0
GK	(England) Graham Brown	33	0	1	0	2	0	36	0
DF	(England) Kevin Bird	26	2	1	0	0	0	27	2
DF	(England) John Cottam	2	1	0	0	0	0	2	1
DF	(England) Sam Ellis	44	7	1	0	2	0	47	7
DF	(England) Barry Foster	11(2)	0	0	0	0	0	11(2)	0
DF	(England) Colin Foster	6	0	0(1)	0	0	0	6(1)	0
DF	(Scotland) Sandy Pate	46	0	1	0	2	1	49	1
DF	(England) John Saunders	14	0	0	0	2	0	16	0
DF	(England) Clive Walker	40	3	1	0	2	1	43	4
MF	(England) David Bentley	1(3)	1	0	0	0	0	1(3)	1
MF	(Wales) Alan Jarvis	24(4)	0	1	0	1	0	26(4)	0
MF	(England) Micky Laverick	12(5)	2	1	0	1	1	14(5)	3
MF	(England) Dennis Longhorn	39(1)	2	1	0	2	1	42(1)	3
MF	(England) Paul Matthews	16	1	0	0	0	0	16	1
MF	(England) Jim McCaffrey	45	7	0	0	2	1	47	8
FW	(England) Alan Crawford	1(1)	0	0	0	0	0	1(1)	0
FW	(England) John Fairbrother	42(2)	20	1	1	2	0	45(2)	21
FW	(England) Alan Green	1	0	0	0	0	0	1	0
FW	(England) Duncan McKenzie	6	7	0	0	0	0	6	7
FW	(England) Dudley Roberts	16(2)	8	0	0	0	0	16(2)	8
FW	(England) John Sainty	3	0	0	0	0	0	3	0
FW	(England) Dave Thompson	38(2)	8	1	0	2	0	41(2)	8
FW	(England) Frank Wignall	27(4)	7	1	0	2	1	30(4)	8
–	Own goals	–	2	–	0	–	0	–	2
