= 1965 Football League Cup final =

- Event: 1964–65 Football League Cup
Chelsea	Leicester City
3	2
- on aggregate

First leg
Chelsea	Leicester City
3	2
- Date: 15 March 1965
- Venue: Stamford Bridge, London
- Referee: Jim Finney (Hereford)
- Attendance: 20,690

Second leg
Leicester City	Chelsea
0	0
- Date: 5 April 1965
- Venue: Filbert Street, Leicester
- Referee: Kevin Howley (Billingham)
- Attendance: 26,957

The 1965 Football League Cup final, the fifth to be staged since the competition's inception, was contested between Leicester City and Chelsea over two legs. Leicester, the holders, were aiming to become the first side to retain the trophy while Chelsea were seeking to become the first London side to win it. Chelsea won 3–2 on aggregate, with all the goals coming in the first leg.

== Route to the final ==
=== Chelsea ===
Round 2	Birmingham City	0–3	Chelsea
Round 3	Chelsea	4–0	Notts County
Round 4	Chelsea	3–2	Swansea City
Round 5	Workington Town	2–2	Chelsea
Round 5 replay	Chelsea	2–0	Workington Town
Semi-final (1st leg)	Aston Villa	2–3	Chelsea
Semi-final (2nd leg)	Chelsea	1–1	Aston Villa
(Chelsea won 4–3 on aggregate)

=== Leicester City ===
Round 2	Leicester City	0–0	Peterborough United
Round 2 Replay	Peterborough United	0–2	Leicester City
Round 3	Grimsby Town	0–5	Leicester City
Round 4	Leicester City	0–0	Crystal Palace
Round 4 Replay	Crystal Palace	1–2	Leicester City
Round 5	Coventry City	1–8	Leicester City
Semi-final (1st leg)	Plymouth Argyle	0–1	Leicester City
Semi-final (2nd leg)	Leicester City	3–2	Plymouth Argyle
(Leicester City won 4–2 on aggregate)

== Match reviews ==
The final was contested over two home-and-away legs, as was customary for the League Cup at the time.

=== First leg ===
The first leg took place on 15 March 1965 at Stamford Bridge, Chelsea's home ground. Chelsea took the lead in the match twice, first through Bobby Tambling and then through a penalty kick by captain Terry Venables, but Leicester City equalised on both occasions, via defender Colin Appleton and forward Jimmy Goodfellow. With ten minutes left, Chelsea's Eddie McCreadie received the ball on the edge of his own penalty area and went on a sixty-yard run, dribbling past several Leicester players before slotting the ball past goalkeeper Gordon Banks. The match ended 3–2 in Chelsea's favour. This was in spite of the fact that Chelsea only had ten players on the pitch for most of the match, after Allan Young – in his first and only appearance of the season – had suffered an early injury. (Substitutions were not allowed at the time.)

McCreadie was actually Chelsea's starting left-back by trade; however, due to an injury to forward Barry Bridges, Chelsea manager Tommy Docherty had been forced to deploy McCreadie as an emergency forward, instead of in his usual spot, for the first leg.

=== Second leg ===
McCreadie's goal in the first match would ultimately prove to be the difference in the tie. The second leg was played at Leicester's Filbert Street on 5 April and ended in a 0–0 draw, giving Chelsea a 3–2 aggregate win and the League Cup championship. Although Leicester applied strong pressure and were in control of much of the match, they were unable to make a critical breakthrough in their home leg, as both sides kept clean sheets. Chelsea centre-halves Frank Upton and John Mortimore – neither of whom had played in the first leg – performed admirably in the second leg and were instrumental in preventing Leicester from creating chances.

For Chelsea, this marked the first-ever domestic cup title in the club's history (they would not win their first FA Cup until 1970).

== Details ==
=== First leg ===
15 March 1965
19:30

Chelsea	3–2	Leicester City
Tambling 33'; Venables 70' (pen.); McCreadie 81'		Appleton 46'; Goodfellow 75'

Stamford Bridge, London
Attendance: 20,690
Referee: Jim Finney (Hereford)

GK	1	(England) Peter Bonetti
CH	2	(England) Marvin Hinton
FB	3	(England) Ron Harris
FB	4	(England) John Hollins
CH	5	(England) Allan Young
CH	6	(Scotland) John Boyle
OR	7	(England) Bert Murray
MF	8	(Scotland) George Graham
FW	9	(Scotland) Eddie McCreadie
MF	10	(England) Terry Venables (c)
OL	11	(England) Bobby Tambling
Manager:
(Scotland) Tommy Docherty

GK	1	(England) Gordon Banks
CH	2	(Scotland) John Sjoberg
FB	3	(England) Richie Norman
FB	4	(England) Len Chalmers
CH	5	(Scotland) Ian King
WH	6	(England) Colin Appleton (c)
W	7	(Scotland) Billy Hodgson
IR	8	(England) Graham Cross
FW	9	(Scotland) Jimmy Goodfellow
IL	10	(Scotland) David Gibson
W	11	(Scotland) Tom Sweenie
Manager:
(Scotland) Matt Gillies

=== Second leg ===
5 April 1965
19:30

Leicester City	0–0	Chelsea

Filbert Street, Leicester
Attendance: 26,957
Referee: Kevin Howley (Billingham)

GK	1	(England) Gordon Banks
RB	2	(England) Clive Walker
LB	3	(England) Richie Norman
MF	4	(Scotland) Bobby Roberts
CH	5	(Scotland) John Sjoberg
CH	6	(England) Colin Appleton (c)
W	7	(Scotland) Billy Hodgson
IR	8	(England) Graham Cross
FW	9	(Scotland) Jimmy Goodfellow
IL	10	(Scotland) David Gibson
W	11	(England) Mike Stringfellow
Manager:
(Scotland) Matt Gillies

GK	1	(England) Peter Bonetti
CH	2	(England) Marvin Hinton
FB	3	(Scotland) Eddie McCreadie
FB	4	(England) Ron Harris
CH	5	(England) John Mortimore
CH	6	(England) Frank Upton
OR	7	(England) Bert Murray
MF	8	(Scotland) John Boyle
FW	9	(England) Barry Bridges
MF	10	(England) Terry Venables (c)
OL	11	(England) Bobby Tambling
Manager:
(Scotland) Tommy Docherty
