= 1971–72 Derby County F.C. season =

Derby County
1971–72 season
- Chairman: Sam Longson
- Manager: Brian Clough
- Stadium: Baseball Ground
- First Division: 1st (In 1972–73 European Cup)
- FA Cup: Fifth round
- League Cup: Second round
- Top goalscorer: League: Alan Hinton (15); All: Alan Hinton (20)
Home colours	Away colours

The 1971–72 season was Derby County's 72nd in the Football League and their 45th season in the top flight. They won their first ever league title to qualify for the 1972–73 European Cup, as well as winning the Texaco Cup. In addition, their reserve side won the Central League for the first time since 1936.

== Season summary ==
Derby began the season with an unbeaten League run of five wins and seven draws although they did exit the League Cup at the second round stage, beaten 2–0 in a replay at Leeds. Defeat at leaders Manchester United in their 13th match triggered a period of inconsistent league form that saw Derby lose five times in 11 matches, the last at Elland Road just after Christmas, but they lost just one of their next 13 and a 2–0 victory against Leeds at the Baseball Ground over Easter took them to the top of the table. They remained there despite losing to Newcastle in the next match, their only home defeat of the season, and then drawing with West Bromwich Albion but had now played a game more than the three teams below them (Leeds, Liverpool and Manchester City) with only two points separating the four.

Two victories followed but defeat at Manchester City in their penultimate match of the campaign saw Derby slip to third with the title race still wide open. City, having completed their fixtures, now led the table on 57 points but could no longer win the league, with Derby and second-placed Liverpool both a point behind and separated only by goal average. Crucially, the two would meet at the Baseball Ground in Derby's final match although the Reds still had a further game in hand. Leeds lay fourth on 55 points, also with two matches remaining and a superior goal average to the other challengers.

Derby ended their season by beating Liverpool 1–0, John McGovern netting the winner, leaving them on 58 points with Leeds (who beat Chelsea 2–0 on the same night) on 57 and Liverpool on 56. Derby's destiny was not in their own hands and they left the country to escape the pressure - Brian Clough holidayed with his family in the Isles of Scilly while Peter Taylor went to Majorca with the players. Leeds needed a draw and Liverpool a win to overtake Derby.

In the event, Wolverhampton Wanderers beat Leeds 2–1 at Molineux and Liverpool could only manage a 0–0 draw at Arsenal. The league was unusually close throughout the campaign and the final table saw Derby champions just one point ahead of the teams in 2nd (Leeds), 3rd (Liverpool) and 4th (City).

Derby County First XI: 1971–72

Clough had built a balanced team at Derby, one in which every player knew his job. They rarely swept away the opposition, instead building on the foundations of a strong defence, although there were some memorable performances, notably in 4–0 defeats of Stoke and Nottingham Forest at the Baseball Ground and away to Sheffield United.

Although Derby reached the FA Cup fifth round, losing 1–0 to eventual runners-up Arsenal in a second replay at Filbert Street, their primary cup success for 1971–72 came in the Texaco Cup, a competition between sixteen English, Scottish and Irish clubs who were not in European competition. With home gates consistently over 20,000, Derby beat Dundee United (8–5 on aggregate), Stoke (4–3 agg.) and Newcastle (4–2 agg.) before playing Airdrieonians in the final. After a 0–0 draw at Broomfield Park, Derby beat their Scottish opponents 2–1 in the second leg at the Baseball Ground with Roger Davies, signed for £12,000 the previous summer from non-league Worcester City, grabbing the decisive goal to give Derby their second cup win in as many seasons.

Record signing defender Colin Todd claimed the club's Player of the Year while Alan Hinton finished the season as top scorer with 15 goals. Kevin Hector netted his 100th for the club in a 6–0 FA Cup fourth round win over Notts County and Alan Durban became the club's most capped international, overtaking Sammy Crooks, with his 27th and final appearance for Wales. Steve Powell became Derby's youngest ever player, a record he held for almost 30 years, when he made his debut in a Texaco Cup tie against Stoke aged just 16 years and 30 days.

== Squad ==
Substitute appearances indicated in brackets

Note: Flags indicate national team as defined under FIFA eligibility rules; some limited exceptions apply. Players may hold more than one non-FIFA nationality.

Pos.	Nation	Player
GK	ENG	Colin Boulton
GK	ENG	Graham Moseley
DF	ENG	Ron Webster
DF	ENG	Roy McFarland (Captain)
DF	ENG	Colin Todd
DF	ENG	John Robson
DF	WAL	Terry Hennessey
DF	ENG	Jim Walker
DF	ENG	Tony Bailey
DF	ENG	Peter Daniel
DF	ENG	Alan Lewis
DF	ENG	Tony Parry

Pos.	Nation	Player
MF	SCO	John McGovern
MF	WAL	Alan Durban
MF	SCO	Archie Gemmill
MF	ENG	Alan Hinton
MF	ENG	Steve Powell
FW	ENG	Frank Wignall
FW	ENG	Kevin Hector
FW	SCO	John O'Hare
FW	ENG	Jeff Bourne
FW	ENG	Barry Butlin
FW	ENG	Roger Davies

=== Transfers ===
In
Pos.	Name	from	Type
FW	Roger Davies	Worcester City	£12,000
DF	Tony Parry	Hartlepool	£2,500
DF	Alan Lewis		
MF	Steve Powell		
GK	Graham Moseley	Blackburn Rovers	

Out
Pos.	Name	To	Type
DF	Dave Mackay	Swindon Town	
FW	Frank Wignall	Mansfield Town	
GK	Les Green	Durban City	
DF	Tony Rhodes		
DF	John Richardson		

== Competitions ==
=== Division One ===
==== League table ====
Pos	Team	Pld	W	D	L	GF	GA	GAv	Pts	Qualification or relegation
1	Derby County (C)	42	24	10	8	69	33	2.091	58	Qualification for the European Cup first round
2	Leeds United	42	24	9	9	73	31	2.355	57	Qualification for the Cup Winners' Cup first round (Note: Leeds United qualified for the European Cup Winners' Cup as the 1971-72 FA Cup winners.)
3	Liverpool	42	24	9	9	64	30	2.133	57	Qualification for the UEFA Cup first round
4	Manchester City	42	23	11	8	77	45	1.711	57	Qualification for the UEFA Cup first round
5	Arsenal	42	22	8	12	58	40	1.450	52	

Source: World Football
Rules for classification: 1) Points; 2) Goal average; 3) Goals scored
(C) Champions

==== Results by round ====
Round	1	2	3	4	5	6	7	8	9	10	11	12	13	14	15	16	17	18	19	20	21	22	23	24	25	26	27	28	29	30	31	32	33	34	35	36	37	38	39	40	41	42
Ground	A	A	H	H	A	H	H	A	H	A	H	A	H	H	A	H	A	H	A	H	A	A	H	H	A	A	H	A	H	A	H	A	A	H	H	A	A	H	H	A	A	H
Result	D	W	W	D	D	D	W	W	D	D	W	D	L	W	W	W	L	W	L	W	L	W	L	W	W	D	W	L	W	W	W	W	W	D	W	W	L	D	W	W	L	W
Position	12	6	3	3	4	3	3	2	3	3	3	4	4	3	2	2	2	2	3	2	4	4	5	4	4	4	3	4	3	3	3	2	2	2	2	1	1	1	1	1	3	1

Source: Competitive matches
A = Away; H = Home; W = Win; D = Draw; L = Loss; = Leader, Qualification to 1972–73 European Cup; = Qualification to 1972–73 UEFA Cup; = Relegation to 1972–73 Second Division; c = Qualification for the Watney Cup

==== Matches ====
14 August 1971 1	Derby County	2–2	Manchester United	Derby
	Hector 50'; Wignall 60'		14' Law; 35' Gowling	Stadium: Baseball Ground; Attendance: 35,386

18 August 1971 2	Derby County	2–0	West Ham United	Derby
	O'Hare 2'; Wignall 7'			Stadium: Baseball Ground; Attendance: 30,783

21 August 1971 3	Leicester City	0–2	Derby County	Leicester
			64' Hector; 67' (pen.) Hinton	Stadium: Filbert Street; Attendance: 35,460

24 August 1971 4	Coventry City	2–2	Derby County	Coventry
	Joicey 39'; Hunt 55' (pen.)		53' O'Hare; 86' Wignall	Stadium: Highfield Road; Attendance: 27,759

28 August 1971 5	Derby County	2–2	Southampton	Derby
	McGovern 39'; Hector 63'		70'Stokes; 83' (pen.) Gabriel	Stadium: Baseball Ground; Attendance: 28,498

31 August 1971 6	Ipswich Town	0–0	Derby County	Ipswich
				Stadium: Portman Road; Attendance: 18,687

4 September 1971 7	Everton	0–2	Derby County	Liverpool
			17' Hector; 70' Wignall	Stadium: Goodison Park; Attendance: 41,024

11 September 1971 8	Derby County	4–0	Stoke City	Derby
	Todd 28'; O'Hare 32'; Hinton 49'; Gemmill 89'			Stadium: Baseball Ground; Attendance: 32,545

18 September 1971 9	Chelsea	1–1	Derby County	Fulham
	Baldwin 66'		32' McFarland	Stadium: Stamford Bridge; Attendance: 42,872

25 September 1971 10	Derby County	0–0	West Bromwich Albion	Derby
				Stadium: Baseball Ground; Attendance: 30,628

2 October 1971 11	Newcastle United	0–1	Derby County	Newcastle-upon-Tyne
			62' Hinton	Stadium: St. James' Park; Attendance: 32,077; Referee: Ivan Smith

9 October 1971 12	Derby County	2–2	Tottenham Hotspur	Derby
	Todd 52'; McFarland 82'		62' Chivers; 87' Pearce	Stadium: Baseball Ground; Attendance: 35,744

16 October 1971 13	Manchester United	1–0	Derby County	Old Trafford
	Best 53'			Stadium: Old Trafford; Attendance: 53,247

23 October 1971 14	Derby County	2–1	Arsenal	Derby
	O'Hare 9'; Hinton 44' (pen.)		22' Graham	Stadium: Baseball Ground; Attendance: 35,480

30 October 1971 15	Nottingham Forest	0–2	Derby County	Nottingham
			58' (pen.) Hinton; 78' Robson	Stadium: City Ground; Attendance: 37,170

6 November 1971 16	Derby County	3–0	Crystal Palace	Derby
	Bell 2' (o.g.); Wignall 48'; Hector 87'			Stadium: Baseball Ground; Attendance: 30,388

13 November 1971 17	Wolverhampton Wanderers	2–1	Derby County	Wolverhampton
	Richards 44', 76'		22' O'Hare	Stadium: Molineux; Attendance: 32,957

20 November 1971 18	Derby County	3–0	Sheffield United	Derby
	Hector 2'; Hinton 14' (pen.); Hinton 68' (pen.)			Stadium: Baseball Ground; Attendance: 35,326

27 November 1971 19	Huddersfield Town	2–1	Derby County	Huddersfield
	Worthington 64'; J Lawson 77'		78' McGovern	Stadium: Leeds Road; Attendance: 15,329

4 December 1971 20	Derby County	3–1	Manchester City	Derby
	Hinton 22' (pen.); Webster 36'; Durban 38'		66' (pen.) Lee	Stadium: Baseball Ground; Attendance: 35,384

11 December 1971 21	Liverpool	3–2	Derby County	Liverpool
	Whitham 14', 44', 53'		42' O'Hare; 49' O'Hare	Stadium: Anfield Road; Attendance: 44,601

18 December 1971 22	Derby County	2–0	Everton	Derby
	Hinton 49', 55'			Stadium: Baseball Ground; Attendance: 27,895

27 December 1971 23	Leeds United	3–0	Derby County	Leeds
	Gray 5'; Lorimer 20', 57'			Stadium: Elland Road; Attendance: 44,214

1 January 1972 24	Derby County	1–0	Chelsea	Derby
	Webb 84' (o.g.)			Stadium: Baseball Ground; Attendance: 33,063
Note: Some sources registered the goal as scored by Gemmill.

8 January 1972 25	Southampton	1–2	Derby County	Southampton
	O’Brien 13'		44' O'Hare; 89' Durban	Stadium: The Dell; Attendance: 19,321

22 January 1972 26	West Ham United	3–3	Derby County	Upton Park
	Lampard 42'; B Robson 48'; Brooking 80'		4' Hinton; 66' Durban; 87' Hector	Stadium: Boleyn Ground; Attendance: 31,045

29 January 1972 27	Derby County	1–0	Coventry City	Derby
	46' Robson			Stadium: Baseball Ground; Attendance: 29,385

12 February 1972 28	Arsenal	2–0	Derby County	Highbury
	George 45' (pen.); George 90'			Stadium: Highbury Park; Attendance: 52,055

19 February 1972 29	Derby County	4–0	Nottingham Forest	Derby
	Hinton 34'; O'Hare 36'; Hinton 49'; Hector 75'			Stadium: Baseball Ground; Attendance: 31,801

4 March 1972 30	Derby County	2–1	Wolverhampton Wanderers	Derby
	Hinton 50' (pen.); McFarland 72'		8' (pen.) McCalliog	Stadium: Baseball Ground; Attendance: 33,456

11 March 1972 31	Tottenham Hotspur	0–1	Derby County	Tottenham
			88' (pen.) Hinton	Stadium: White Hart Lane; Attendance: 36,310

18 March 1972 32	Derby County	3–0	Leicester City	Derby
	O'Hare 17'; Durban 67'; Hector 87'			Stadium: Baseball Ground; Attendance: 34,019

22 March 1972 33	Derby County	1–0	Ipswich Town	Derby
	Hector 15'			Stadium: Baseball Ground; Attendance: 26,738

25 March 1972 34	Stoke City	1–1	Derby County	Stoke-on-Trent
	Greenhoff 48' (pen.)		52' Durban	Stadium: Victoria Ground; Attendance: 33,771

28 March 1972 35	Crystal Palace	0–1	Derby County	South Norwood
			Walker	Stadium: Selhurst Park; Attendance: 21,158

1 April 1972 36	Derby County	2–0	Leeds United	Derby
	O'Hare 16'; Hunter 70' (o.g.)			Stadium: Baseball Ground; Attendance: 38,611

3 April 1972 37	Derby County	0–1	Newcastle United	Derby
	McFarland (yellow card) 45'	Report	70' Cassidy	Stadium: Baseball Ground; Attendance: 38,119

5 April 1972 38	West Bromwich Albion	0–0	Derby County	West Bromwich
				Stadium: The Hawthorns; Attendance: 32,439

8 April 1972 39	Sheffield United	0-4	Derby County	Sheffield
			12'Gemmill; 18' Hector; 64' Durban; 83' O'Hare	Stadium: Bramall Lane; Attendance: 38,238

15 April 1972 40	Derby County	3–0	Huddersfield Town	Derby
	McFarland 15'; Hector 22'; O'Hare 52'			Stadium: Baseball Ground; Attendance: 31,414

22 April 1972 41	Manchester City	2–0	Derby County	Moss Side
	Marsh 24'; Lee 67' (pen.)			Stadium: Maine Road; Attendance: 55,023

1 May 1972 42	Derby County	1–0	Liverpool	Derby
	McGovern 63'			Stadium: Baseball Ground; Attendance: 39,159

=== League Cup ===
==== Second round ====
8 September 1971	Derby County	0–0	Leeds United	Derby
				Stadium: Baseball Ground; Attendance: 34,023

27 September 1971 replay	Leeds United	2–0	Derby County	Leeds
	Lorimer 35', 65'			Stadium: Elland Road; Attendance: 29,132

=== Texaco Cup ===
==== First round ====
15 September 1971 1	Derby County (England)	6–2	(Scotland) Dundee United	Derby
	Durban; Hector; Walker; O'Hare; Hinton; Robson			Attendance: 20,059

29 September 1971 2	Dundee United (Scotland)	3–2	(England) Derby County	Dundee
	Goal		Hinton; Butlin	Stadium: Tannadice Park; Attendance: 6000

==== Second round ====
20 October 1971 1	Derby County (England)	3–2	(England) Stoke City	Derby
	O'Hare, Hector		Goal	Stadium: Baseball Ground; Attendance: 21,487

3 November 1971 2	Stoke City (England)	1–1	(England) Derby County	Stoke-on-Trent
	Goal		Wignall	Stadium: Victoria Ground; Attendance: 23,461

==== Semifinals ====
24 November 1971 1	Derby County	1–0	(England) Newcastle United	Derby
	O'Hare			Stadium: Baseball Ground; Attendance: 20,021

8 December 1971 2	Newcastle United (England)	2–3	(England) Derby County	Newcastle-upon-Tyne
			Walker; McGovern; Todd	Stadium: St. James' Park; Attendance: 37,140

==== Finals ====
25 January 1972 1	Airdrieonians (Scotland)	0–0	Derby County	Airdrie
				Stadium: Broomfield Park; Attendance: 16,000

26 April 1972 2	Derby County (England)	2–1	(Scotland) Airdrieonians	Derby
	Hinton (pen), Davies		Goal	Stadium: Baseball Ground; Attendance: 25,102

=== FA Cup ===
==== Third round ====
15 January 1972	Derby County	2–0	Shrewsbury Town
	Hector 68'; Hector 85'			Attendance: 32,463

==== Fourth round ====
5 February 1972	Derby County	6–0	Notts County	Derby
	Robson 19'; Hector 44'; Durban 56'; Durban 58'; Hinton 62' (pen.); Durban 74'			Stadium: Baseball Ground; Attendance: 39,450

==== Fifth round ====
26 February 1972	Derby County	2–2	Arsenal	Derby
	Hinton 47' (pen.); Durban 88'		41', 79' Charlie George	Stadium: Baseball Ground; Attendance: 39,622

29 February 1972 replay	Arsenal	0–0 (a.e.t.)	Derby County	Islington
				Stadium: Highbury; Attendance: 63,077

13 March 1972 2nd replay	Arsenal	1–0	Derby County	Leicester
	Ray Kennedy			Stadium: N Attendance: 36,534

== Statistics ==
=== Players statistics ===
No.	Pos	Nat	Player	Total		Football League Division One		Football League Cup		FA Cup		Texaco Cup	
No.	Pos	Nat	Player	Apps	Goals	Apps	Goals	Apps	Goals	Apps	Goals	Apps	Goals
	GK	(England) ENG	Colin Boulton	57	0	42	0	2	0	5	0	8	0
	DF	(England) ENG	Ron Webster	50	1	38	1	2	0	5	0	5	0
	DF	(England) ENG	Roy McFarland	47	4	38	4	2	0	5	0	2	0
	DF	(England) ENG	Colin Todd	53	3	40	2	2	0	5	0	6	1
	DF	(England) ENG	John Robson	54	4	41	2	2	0	5	1	6	1
	MF	(Scotland) SCO	John McGovern	52	4	39+1	3	1	0	5	0	6	1
	MF	(Scotland) SCO	Archie Gemmill	50	3	40	3	2	0	5	0	3	0
	MF	(Wales) WAL	Alan Durban	41	12	31	6	1	0	5	4	4	2
	MF	(England) ENG	Alan Hinton	53	20	38	15	2	0	5	2	8	3
	FW	(England) ENG	Kevin Hector	55	17	42	12	2	0	5	3	6	2
	FW	(Scotland) SCO	John O'Hare	52	17	40	13	2	0	5	0	5	4
	GK	(England) ENG	Graham Moseley	0	0	0	0	0	0	0	0	0	0
	DF	(Wales) WAL	Terry Hennessey	27	0	17+1	0	0	0	0+1	0	8	0
	FW	(England) ENG	Frank Wignall	16	6	10+1	5	2	0	0	0	3	1
	DF	(England) ENG	Jim Walker	10	3	3+3	1	0	0	0	0	2+2	2
	MF	(England) ENG	Steve Powell	6	0	2+1	0	0	0	0+1	0	2	0
	DF	(England) ENG	Tony Bailey	4	0	1	0	0	0	0	0	2+1	0
	DF	(England) ENG	Peter Daniel	5	0	0	0	0	0	0	0	5	0
	DF	(England) ENG	Alan Lewis	1	0	0	0	0	0	0	0	1	0
	DF	(England) ENG	Tony Parry	1	0	0	0	0	0	0	0	1	0
	FW	(England) ENG	Jeff Bourne	1	0	0	0	0	0	0	0	1	0
	FW	(England) ENG	Barry Butlin	3	1	0	0	0	0	0	0	3	1
	FW	(England) ENG	Roger Davies	1	1	0	0	0	0	0	0	1	1

- Source: https://www.11v11.com/teams/derby-county/tab/players/season/1972/
