= Marvin Hinton =

English footballer (1940–2025)

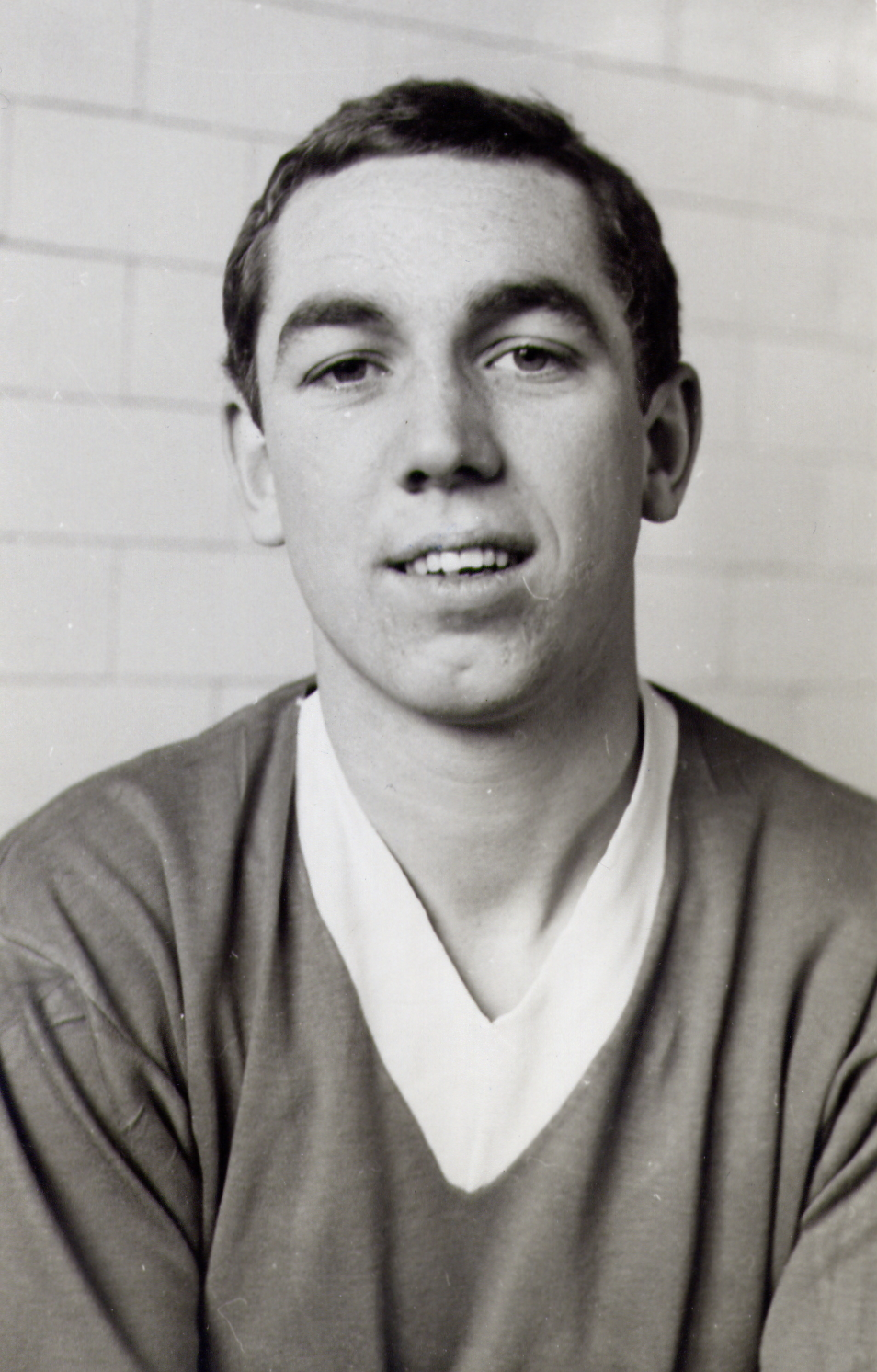

Personal information
- Date of birth: 2 February 1940
- Place of birth: Norwood, London, England
- Date of death: 2 December 2025 (aged 85)
- Position: Defender

Senior career*
Years	Team	Apps	(Gls)
1957–1963	Charlton Athletic	131	(2)
1963–1976	Chelsea	265	(3)
1976–1978	Barnet	61	(2)
Total		457	(7)

International career
1962	England U23	3	(0)
- * Club domestic league appearances and goals

Marvin Hinton (2 February 1940 – 2 December 2025) was an English footballer who made nearly 400 appearances in the Football League playing as a defender for Charlton Athletic and Chelsea.

== Early life ==
Hinton was born in Norwood, and brought up in South Norwood London SE25 and attended nearby Ashburton School.

== Club career ==
=== Charlton ===
Hinton began his football career with Charlton Athletic having overlooked his local club Crystal Palace, making his debut in the Second Division in the 1957–58 season. While a Charlton player he won three caps for the England under-23 team.

Hinton made his League debut as a full-back but he later made a number of appearances at wing-half and inside forward before earning a regular first-team place at centre-half in 1961 following an injury to Gordon Jago.

=== Chelsea ===
After scoring twice from 131 appearances in the Football League, Hinton was signed for Chelsea by Tommy Docherty in August 1963 for £30,000. He made his Chelsea debut on 12 October 1963 in a 3–1 win at Ipswich Town.

When Hinton moved to Chelsea he reverted to full back. Playing as part of a richly-talented team including the likes of Charlie Cooke, Alan Hudson, Bobby Tambling, John Hollins, Peter Bonetti and Peter Osgood he was part of the successful Chelsea side of the 60s and early 70s, earning his first winners' medal with the League Cup in 1965. After the departure of John Mortimore and Frank Upton, Hinton formed a long lasting partnership with Ron Harris in central defence. An appearance in the 1967 FA Cup Final defeat to Tottenham Hotspur earned him a runners-up medal and further success was to follow with victory in the 1970 FA Cup Final, where Chelsea defeated Leeds United, the reigning League Champions and one of the strongest teams of the era, in a replay at Old Trafford; Hinton came on as a substitute in both games. as the signing of John Dempsey and David Webb increased competition for first team places. Under coach (and later Manager) Dave Sexton, Hinton, Harris and Eddie McCreadie pioneered the zonal marking system of defence in the English First Division, consistently playing together throughout the Sixties.

Hinton continued to play for Chelsea until 1976, although further success eluded the club after their 1971 Cup Winner's Cup victory, culminating in relegation to the Second Division a year before Hinton left Stamford Bridge. After his League career he had a spell with Barnet before retirement.

In all, Hinton made 344 appearances for Chelsea between 1963 and 1976, scoring 4 goals.

== International football ==
Though a member of Alf Ramsey's provisional 40-man squad for the 1966 World Cup, he never won a full cap.

== Death ==
Hinton died on 2 December 2025, at the age of 85.

== Honours ==
Chelsea

- FA Cup: 1969–70; runner-up 1966–67
- Football League Cup: 1964–65
