= David Bentley (disambiguation) =

David Bentley (born 1984) is an English footballer.

David Bentley may also refer to:

- David Bentley (bishop of Barbados) (1882–1970), Anglican bishop
- David Bentley (bishop of Gloucester) (1935–2020), Anglican bishop
- David Bentley (businessman), Canadian businessman and media entrepreneur
- David Bentley (journalist), Australian journalist and musician
- David Bentley (footballer, born 1950), English footballer

== See also ==
- David Bentley Hart (born 1965), Eastern Orthodox theologian
