= Brian Bates =

Brian Bates may refer to:

- Brian Bates (psychologist) (born 1944), British professor of psychology and writer
- Brian Bates (soccer) (born 1972), American soccer defender
- Brian Bates (footballer) (born 1944), English winger
- Brian Vincent Bates, known as Killah B, American songwriter and record producer
