= Tom Sweenie =

Scottish footballer (1945–2026)

Personal information
- Full name: Thomas Thornton Sweenie
- Date of birth: 15 July 1945
- Place of birth: Paisley, Scotland
- Date of death: 7 July 2026 (aged 80)
- Position: Midfielder

Senior career*
Years	Team	Apps	(Gls)
- Johnstone Burgh
1963–1968	Leicester City	51	(11)
1968	Arsenal	0	(0)
1968	Huddersfield Town	0	(0)
1968–1969	York City	6	(1)
1969–?	Burton Albion		
- Lockheed Leamington
Total		57	(12)
- * Club domestic league appearances and goals

Thomas Thornton Sweenie (15 July 1945 – 7 July 2026) was a Scottish professional footballer who played as a midfielder in the Football League for Leicester City and York City, in non-League football for Burton Albion and Lockheed Leamington, in Scottish junior football for Johnstone Burgh, and was on the books of Arsenal and Huddersfield Town without making a league appearance. Sweenie died on 7 July 2026, aged 80.

== Honours ==
Leicester City

- Football League Cup runner-up: 1964–65
