= Frank Upton =

English footballer (1934–2011)

Personal information
- Full name: Frank Upton
- Date of birth: 18 October 1934
- Place of birth: Atherstone, England
- Date of death: 17 May 2011 (aged 76)
- Place of death: Derby, England
- Position: Central defender

Senior career*
| Years | Team | Apps | (Gls) |
| 1950–1954 | Nuneaton Borough | | (?) |
| 1953–1954 | Northampton Town | 17 | (1) |
| 1954–1961 | Derby County | 224 | (12) |
| 1961–1965 | Chelsea | 74 | (3) |
| 1965–1966 | Derby County | 35 | (5) |
| 1966–1967 | Notts County | 34 | (3) |
| 1967–1968 | Worcester City | | (?) |
| 1968 | Workington | 7 | (0) |

Managerial career
- 1968: Workington
- 1979–1980: Randers FC
- 1981: Al-Arabi Kuwait
- 1984–1985: Bedworth United
- 1987–1989: Keflavik ÍF
- 1989–90: Sabah FA
- 1990: Burton Albion (caretaker)
- * Club domestic league appearances and goals

Frank Upton (18 October 1934 – 17 May 2011) was an English professional football player and manager.

== Playing career ==
Upton, a hard tackling central defender, began his football career with Nuneaton Borough. He moved to Northampton Town in March 1953, making his league debut the same season. In June 1954 he moved to Derby County, making over 200 appearances before a £15,000 move to Chelsea in August 1961. He helped Chelsea to promotion back to the First Division in the 1962–63 season and won the League Cup with them in 1965.

In September 1965 he rejoined Derby County, moving on to Notts County a year later. He left league football the following summer, joining non-league Worcester City in July 1967,

== Coaching and managerial career ==
Upton joined Workington as player-manager in January 1968, but lost his job six months later after Workington had finished 23rd in Football League Division Four Division Four and been forced to seek re-election.

He joined Northampton Town's coaching staff in October 1969, but moved to coach Aston Villa in January 1970. He joined Chelsea's coaching staff in August 1977 and became caretaker manager in December 1978 after the dismissal of Ken Shellito. He was later coach of Danish side Randers Freja between February 1979 and February 1980.

He joined Dundee as a coach in August 1980 and coached Al Arabi of Kuwait in 1981. In 1982, he returned to the UK as coach of Wolverhampton Wanderers, a post he held until October 1984 when he was appointed as manager of Bedworth United.

He was assistant manager of Coventry City between December 1985 and April 1987. The following month he took over as coach of Icelandic side Keflavik ÍF. In May 1989 he was appointed as coach to the Sabah FA, but returned to the UK as caretaker-manager of Burton Albion in January 1990.

He was appointed as youth coach at Conference side Northwich Victoria in April 1990, taking a similar position at Cheltenham Town in November 1990.

In 1991, he opened a sports injuries clinic in Derby, continuing with his coaching career and joined the coaching staff at Leicester City in 1992.

In December 2008 he returned to Derby for the annual dinner of the Derby County Former Players' Association, and he served on the association's committee. He died just over two years later, in May 2011, at the age of 76.
