= Len Chalmers =

English footballer

Personal information
- Full name: Leonard Austin Chalmers
- Date of birth: 4 September 1936
- Place of birth: Geddington, England
- Date of death: 10 February 2014 (aged 77)
- Place of death: Northampton, England
- Height: 5 ft 10 in (1.78 m)
- Position: Full back

Senior career*
Years	Team	Apps	(Gls)
195?–1956	Corby Town		
1956–1966	Leicester City	171	(4)
1966–1968	Notts County	51	(1)
1968–19??	Dunstable Town		
Total		222	(5)
- * Club domestic league appearances and goals

Leonard Austin Chalmers (4 September 1936 – 10 February 2014) was an English footballer who played in the Football League for Leicester City and Notts County.

Chalmers played for Corby Town before signing for Leicester City in 1956. Nicknamed 'Chopper' for his fully committed playing style, Chalmers played 80 minutes of the 1961 FA Cup Final hobbling on the wing after suffering a badly gashed shin which rendered him no more than nuisance value as no substitutions were then allowed. Leicester City lost 2–0 to Tottenham Hotspur. After leaving Notts County, he played non-league football for Dunstable Town.

Chalmers died on 10 February 2014 at the age of 77. Leicester City held a minute's applause before their home game with Ipswich Town on 22 February, with Chalmers' family in attendance.

== Honours ==
Leicester City

- FA Cup runner-up: 1960–61
- Football League Cup runner-up: 1964–65
