= Mick Hopkinson =

English footballer (born 1942)

Personal information
- Full name: Michael Edward Hopkinson
- Date of birth: 24 February 1942 (age 84)
- Place of birth: Ambergate, England
- Height: 5 ft 9 in (1.75 m)
- Position: Full-back

Senior career*
Years	Team	Apps	(Gls)
1959–1968	Derby County	115	(4)
1968–1970	Mansfield Town	46	(1)
1970–1971	Port Vale	13	(0)
1971–1972	Boston United	17	(0)
- Belper Town
Total		191+	(5+)

Managerial career
- Belper Town
- * Club domestic league appearances and goals

Michael Edward Hopkinson (born 24 February 1942) is an English former footballer who played at full-back for Derby County, Mansfield Town, Port Vale, Boston United, and Belper Town. He had a 12-year career in the Football League, making 174 league appearances.

== Career ==
Hopkinson began his career with Derby County, who finished the 1959–60 season in 18th place in the Second Division under the stewardship of Harry Storer. The "Rams" finished 12th in 1960–61 and 16th in 1961–62, before new boss Tim Ward took them to 18th in 1962–63, 13th in 1963–64, ninth in 1964–65, eighth in 1965–66, and 17th in 1966–67. He left Derby after new manager Brian Clough led County to 18th place in 1967–68. He scored four goals in 115 league appearances at the Baseball Ground. Hopkinson then transferred to Tommy Eggleston's Mansfield Town, who finished 15th in the Third Division in 1968–69 and then sixth in 1969–70. He scored one goal in 46 league games at Field Mill. He signed with Gordon Lee's Port Vale in July 1970. He played 13 Third Division games in the 1970–71 season. He left Vale Park on a free transfer in May 1971 and moved on to Boston United, Belper Town (as player-coach and later as manager), before becoming the coach and assistant manager at Burton Albion.

== Career statistics ==
Appearances and goals by club, season and competition
Club	Season	League			FA Cup		Other		Total	
Club	Season	Division	Apps	Goals	Apps	Goals	Apps	Goals	Apps	Goals
Derby County	1960–61	Second Division	2	0	0	0	0	0	2	0
Derby County	1961–62	Second Division	32	1	3	0	4	0	39	1
Derby County	1962–63	Second Division	17	0	1	0	0	0	18	0
Derby County	1963–64	Second Division	19	2	0	0	1	0	20	2
Derby County	1964–65	Second Division	4	0	1	1	0	0	5	1
Derby County	1965–66	Second Division	3	0	0	0	1	0	4	0
Derby County	1966–67	Second Division	16	1	1	0	0	0	17	1
Derby County	1967–68	Second Division	22	0	0	0	4	1	26	1
Derby County	Total		115	4	6	1	10	1	131	6
Mansfield Town	1968–69	Third Division	44	1	7	0	1	0	52	1
Mansfield Town	1969–70	Third Division	2	0	1	0	1	0	4	0
Mansfield Town	Total		46	1	8	0	2	0	56	1
Port Vale	1970–71	Third Division	13	0	1	0	0	0	14	0
Boston United	1971–72	Northern Premier League	17	0	2	0	2	0	21	0
Career total			191	5	17	1	14	1	222	7
