= Alan Lewis (footballer) =

English footballer

Personal information
- Full name: Alan Trevor Lewis
- Date of birth: 19 August 1954
- Place of birth: Oxford, England
- Date of death: 21 May 2016 (aged 61)
- Place of death: Reading, England
- Position: Left back

Senior career*
Years	Team	Apps	(Gls)
1972–1975	Derby County	2	(0)
1974	→ Peterborough United (loan)	10	(1)
1974	→ Sheffield Wednesday (loan)	0	(0)
1974	→ Brighton & Hove Albion (loan)	0	(0)
1975–1977	Brighton & Hove Albion	3	(0)
1977–1982	Reading	149	(5)
- Witney Town
Total		164	(6)

International career
1972	England Youth	7	(0)
- * Club domestic league appearances and goals

Alan Trevor Lewis (19 August 1954 – 21 May 2016) was an English professional footballer who played as a left back.

== Career ==
Born in Oxford, Lewis played for Derby County, Peterborough United, Brighton & Hove Albion, Reading, and Witney Town.
