= Bob Todd (footballer) =

English footballer (1949–2022)

Personal information
- Full name: Robert Charles Todd
- Date of birth: 11 September 1949
- Place of birth: Goole, East Riding of Yorkshire, England
- Date of death: 31 March 2022 (aged 72)
- Position: Left winger

Youth career
- Scunthorpe United

Senior career*
Years	Team	Apps	(Gls)
1967–1968	Liverpool	0	(0)
1968–1969	Rotherham United	6	(0)
1968–1969	Mansfield Town	4	(0)
1969–1970	Workington	16	(0)
1970	Hartlepool	0	(0)
1970–1972	Wigan Athletic	110	(14)
1972–1973	Altrincham		
1973–1975	Scarborough	111	(17)
- * Club domestic league appearances and goals

Robert Charles Todd (11 September 1949 – 31 March 2022) was an English professional footballer who played as a left winger in the Football League.
