= Jimmy Sutton =

Scottish footballer

Personal information
- Full name: James Peter Sutton
- Date of birth: 6 September 1949 (age 77)
- Place of birth: Glasgow, Scotland
- Position: Midfielder

Senior career*
Years	Team	Apps	(Gls)
1968–1969	St Roch's		
1969–1970	Newcastle United	0	(0)
1970–1971	Mansfield Town	13	(0)
1971	Morecambe		
Total		13	(0)
- * Club domestic league appearances and goals

James Peter Sutton (born 6 September 1949) is a Scottish former professional footballer who played in the Football League for Mansfield Town.
