= Bobby Bell (English footballer) =

English footballer

Personal information
- Date of birth: 26 October 1950 (age 76)
- Place of birth: Cambridge, England
- Position: Defender

Youth career
- ?–1968: Tottenham Hotspur

Senior career*
Years	Team	Apps	(Gls)
1968–1971	Ipswich Town	32	(1)
1971	Blackburn Rovers	2	(0)
1971–1973	Crystal Palace	31	(0)
1972	→Norwich City (loan)	3	(0)
1973–1976	Hellenic	?	(?)
1976–1977	York City	5	(0)
1977–?	Fort Lauderdale Strikers		
- * Club domestic league appearances and goals

Robert Charles Bell (born 26 October 1950) is an English former professional footballer.

Bell, a central defender, began his career as an apprentice with Tottenham Hotspur before playing for Ipswich Town, Blackburn Rovers, Crystal Palace, Norwich City, Hellenic (South Africa), York City and Fort Lauderdale Strikers.

His loan spell with Norwich came during the 1971–72 season when the team won the second division championship. He made three appearances for the club, and was the club's first ever loan player.
