= Dennis Longhorn =

English footballer

Personal information
- Date of birth: 12 September 1950 (age 76)
- Place of birth: Hythe, Hampshire, England
- Position: Midfielder

Youth career
- Bournemouth

Senior career*
Years	Team	Apps	(Gls)
1967–1971	Bournemouth	30	(1)
1971–1973	Mansfield Town	96	(5)
1973–1976	Sunderland	40	(3)
1976–1977	Sheffield United	36	(1)
1977–1980	Aldershot	53	(3)
1980–1983	Colchester United	71	(0)
1983–1984	Chelmsford City	?	(?)
- * Club domestic league appearances and goals as of 00:37, 15 May 2011

Dennis Longhorn (born 12 September 1950 in Hythe, Hampshire, England) is an English former professional footballer. He played for Bournemouth, Mansfield Town, Sunderland, Sheffield United, Aldershot, Colchester United and Chelmsford City.

== Center Parcs ==
Dennis now runs the football school at Center Parcs, Elveden Forest, and where he has worked for nearly 31 years following retirement from professional football.
