= Brian Bates (footballer) =

English footballer

Personal information
- Full name: Brian Frederick Bates
- Date of birth: 4 December 1944 (age 81)
- Place of birth: Beeston, England
- Position: Winger

Youth career
- Loughborough College

Senior career*
Years	Team	Apps	(Gls)
1963–1969	Notts County	128	(24)
1969–1970	Mansfield Town	20	(3)
- Boston United
Total		148	(27)
- * Club domestic league appearances and goals

Brian Frederick Bates (born 4 December 1944) is an English former professional footballer who played as a winger.

== Career ==
Born in Beeston, Bates played for Loughborough College, Notts County, Mansfield Town and Boston United.
