= Ray Keeley =

English footballer

Personal information
- Full name: Raymond Keeley
- Date of birth: 25 December 1946 (age 79)
- Place of birth: Battersea, England
- Position: Winger

Senior career*
Years	Team	Apps	(Gls)
1964–1965	Charlton Athletic	1	(0)
1965–1967	Exeter City	46	(10)
1967–1968	Crawley Town		
1968–1970	Mansfield Town	52	(5)
1970	Burton Albion		
1970	Poole Town		
1971	Andover		
Total		99	(15)
- * Club domestic league appearances and goals

Raymond Keeley (born 25 December 1946) is an English former professional footballer who played in the Football League for Charlton Athletic, Exeter City and Mansfield Town.
