= Des Finch =

English footballer

Personal information
- Full name: Desmond Richard Finch
- Date of birth: 26 February 1950 (age 76)
- Place of birth: Worksop, England
- Position: Goalkeeper

Senior career*
Years	Team	Apps	(Gls)
1968–1971	Mansfield Town	4	(0)
1971	Worksop Town		
1972	Boston United		
Total		4	(0)
- * Club domestic league appearances and goals

Desmond Richard Finch (born 26 February 1950) is an English former professional footballer who played in the Football League for Mansfield Town.
