= Nick Sharkey =

Scottish footballer

Personal information
- Full name: Dominic Sharkey
- Date of birth: 4 May 1943
- Place of birth: Helensburgh, Scotland
- Date of death: 8 February 2015 (aged 71)
- Place of death: Sunderland, England
- Position: Forward

Senior career*
Years	Team	Apps	(Gls)
1960–1966	Sunderland	99	(51)
1966–1968	Leicester City	6	(5)
1968–1970	Mansfield Town	69	(17)
1970–1972	Hartlepool United	60	(12)
- South Shields

International career
1964	Scotland under-23	2	(0)
- * Club domestic league appearances and goals

Dominic "Nick" Sharkey (4 May 1943 – 8 February 2015) was a Scottish footballer who played for Sunderland as a forward.

== Club career ==
Sharkey began his career with Sunderland, where he made his debut on 9 April 1960 against Scunthorpe United in a 1–0 win at Roker Park. In total, he made 99 league appearances, scoring 51 goals for the club from 1960 to 1966. He then joined Leicester City in 1966 but made just six appearances, scoring five goals. His next club was Mansfield Town, where he signed for in 1968. He scored 17 goals in 69 games for the club. He finished his League career with North East team Hartlepool United in 1970, where he made a total of 60 appearances with 12 goals to his name, and then moved into non-League football with South Shields.
