= John Bingham (English footballer) =

English footballer (born 1949)

Personal information
- Date of birth: 23 September 1949 (age 77)
- Place of birth: Ilkeston, England
- Position: Winger

Youth career
- Charlton Athletic
- 1967–1969: Manchester City

Senior career*
Years	Team	Apps	(Gls)
1969–1970	Oldham Athletic	17	(3)
1970–1972	Mansfield Town	21	(0)
1972	→ Chester (loan)	7	(0)
1972–1973	Stockport County	20	(3)
- Safeway United
Total		65	(6)
- * Club domestic league appearances and goals

John Bingham is a footballer who played as a winger in the Football League for Oldham Athletic, Mansfield Town, Chester and Stockport County.
