= David Bentley (footballer, born 1950) =

English footballer

Personal information
- Full name: David Alwyn Bentley
- Date of birth: 30 May 1950 (age 76)
- Place of birth: Edwinstowe, England
- Height: 5 ft 8 1/2 in (1.74 m)
- Position: Midfielder

Senior career*
| Years | Team | Apps | (Gls) |
| 1966–1974 | Rotherham United | 250 | (13) |
| 1972–1973 | → Mansfield Town (loan) | 4 | (1) |
| 1974–1977 | Chesterfield | 55 | (1) |
| 1977–1980 | Doncaster Rovers | 89 | (4) |
| Total | | 398 | (19) |
- * Club domestic league appearances and goals

David Alwyn Bentley (born 30 May 1950) is an English former professional footballer who played in the Football League for Chesterfield, Doncaster Rovers, Mansfield Town and Rotherham United.
