= Frank Wignall =

English footballer and manager

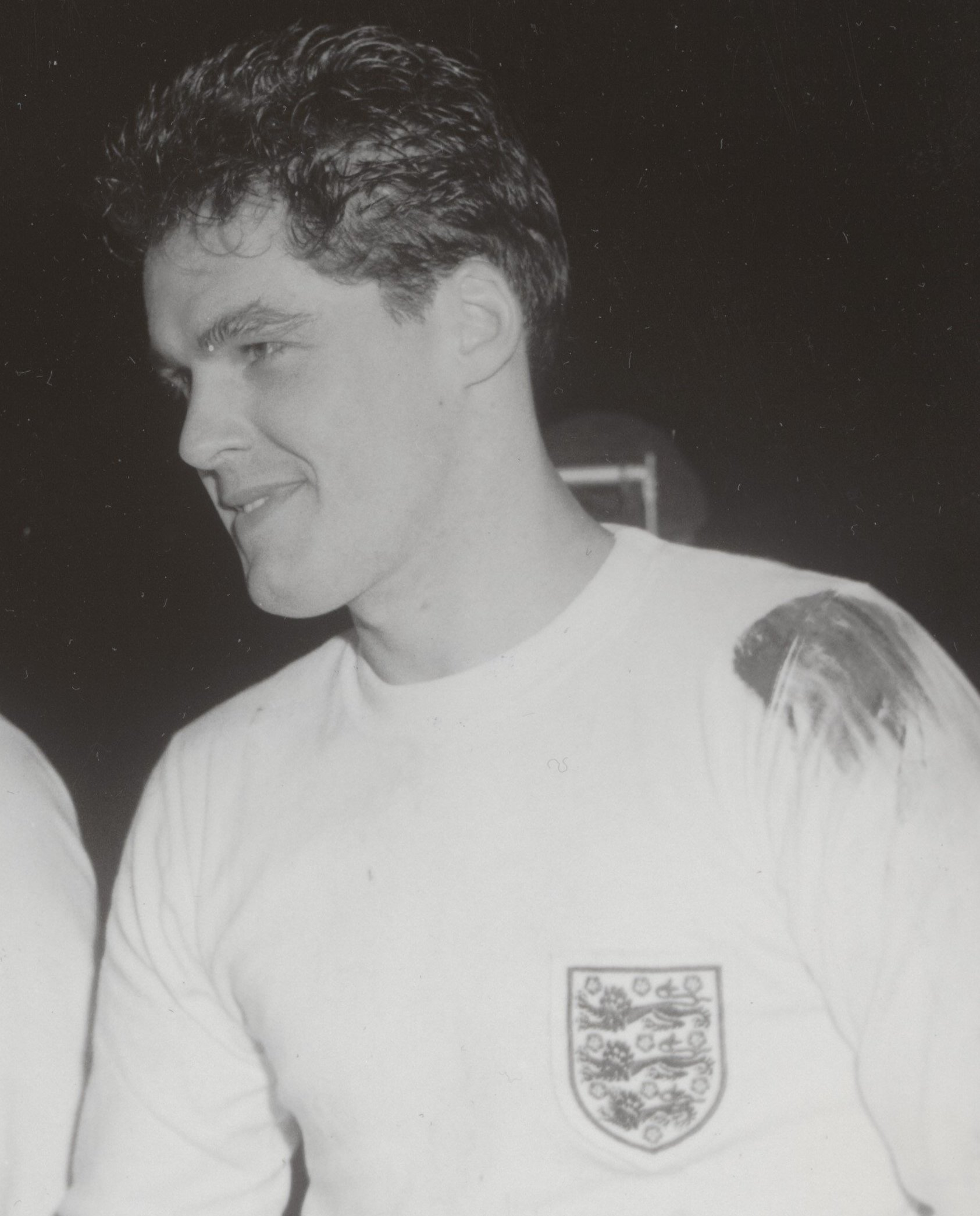
- Wignall in December 1964

Personal information
- Full name: Frank Wignall
- Date of birth: 21 August 1939 (age 87)
- Place of birth: Blackrod, England
- Height: 5 ft 10 1/2 in (1.79 m)
- Position: Striker

Senior career*
Years	Team	Apps	(Gls)
1957–1958	Horwich R.M.I		
1958–1963	Everton	33	(15)
1963–1968	Nottingham Forest	157	(47)
1968–1969	Wolverhampton Wanderers	32	(15)
1969–1971	Derby County	45	(15)
1971–1973	Mansfield Town	56	(15)
1973–1974	King's Lynn		
1974	Burton Albion		
Total		323	(107)

International career
1964	England	2	(2)

Managerial career
- 1973–1974: King's Lynn (player-manager)
- 1975–1976: Qatar
- 1981–????: Shepshed Charterhouse
- * Club domestic league appearances and goals

Frank Wignall (born 21 August 1939) is an English former footballer who played professionally for Everton, Nottingham Forest, Wolverhampton Wanderers, Derby County and Mansfield Town, as well as at international level with England. He later became player-manager of King's Lynn. After a spell with the Qatar national team, in July 1981 he was appointed manager of Shepshed Charterhouse.

== Club career ==
Wignall signed for Nottingham Forest from Everton in 1963 for, a then club record transfer of, about £20,000. He made his debut on 24 August 1963 against Aston Villa and scored his first goal in his second game away to Liverpool on 29 August. He was Forest's top scorer during his first two seasons there with 21 goals in the 1963–64 season and 16 goals in the 1964–65 season. His last competitive appearance was in the FA Cup at Leeds United on 17 February 1968.

Wignall played for Derby County between 1969 and 1971, and began the 1971–72 season playing regularly, scoring 5 goals in 11 league appearances. However he was transferred to Mansfield Town late in 1971 and Derby went on to win the First Division title that season in his absence.

== International career ==
Wignall played twice for England as a centre forward. He scored his two international goals on his England debut against Wales at Wembley Stadium in a 2–1 victory on 18 November 1964. His second and final game for England was in a 1–1 draw away to the Netherlands. Wignall believed that he might have made the England squad for the 1966 FIFA World Cup, had he not broken his leg, saying that "I was in the England team and Geoff Hurst took my position. All because I broke me leg".
