= 1964–65 Football League Cup =

1964–65 League Cup
Tournament details
- Country: England; Wales
- Teams: 82

Final positions
- Champions: Chelsea
- Runners-up: Leicester City

Tournament statistics
- Top goal scorer: Bobby Tambling (6 goals)

The 1964–65 Football League Cup was the fifth season of the Football League Cup, a knockout competition for England's top 92 football clubs; 82 of them competed. (Note: Arsenal, Burnley, Everton, Liverpool, Manchester United, Nottingham Forest, Sheffield Wednesday, Tottenham Hotspur, West Bromwich Albion and Wolverhampton Wanderers were the 10 League clubs that did not compete.) The competition ended with the two-legged final on 15 March and 5 April 1965.

Match dates and results were initially drawn from Soccerbase, and they were later checked against Rothmans Football Yearbook 1970–71.

== Calendar ==
Of the 82 teams, 46 received a bye to the second round and the other 36 played in the first round; these were the teams ranked 57th–92nd in the 1963–64 Football League. Semi-finals and final were two-legged.

Round	Main date	Fixtures		Clubs	New entries this round
Round	Main date	Original	Replays	Clubs	New entries this round
First Round	2 September 1964	18	4	82 → 64	36 (teams ranked 13th–24th in Third Division; all Fourth Division)
Second Round	23 September 1964	32	4	64 → 32	46 (all First and Second Division, except those teams that did not enter; teams ranked 1st–12th in Third Division)
Third Round	14 October 1964	16	3	32 → 16	none
Fourth Round	4 November 1964	8	1	16 → 8	none
Fifth Round	25 November 1964	4	1	8 → 4	none
Semi-finals	20 January & 10 February 1965	4	0	4 → 2	none
Final	15 March & 5 April 1965	2	0	2 → 1	none

== First round ==
=== Ties ===
Home team	Score	Away team	Date
Barnsley	2–1	Lincoln City	2 September 1964
Bradford City	2–0	York City	2 September 1964
Brentford	0–2	Southend United	2 September 1964
Brighton & Hove Albion	2–2	Millwall	2 September 1964
Chester	3–0	Wrexham	2 September 1964
Chesterfield	3–0	Hartlepools United	2 September 1964
Colchester United	1–1	Torquay United	2 September 1964
Doncaster Rovers	1–0	Bradford Park Avenue	2 September 1964
Exeter City	2–0	Gillingham	2 September 1964
Halifax Town	1–3	Darlington	2 September 1964
Notts County	3–2	Newport County	2 September 1964
Port Vale	0–1	Luton Town	7 September 1964
Queens Park Rangers	5–2	Aldershot	2 September 1964
Southport	0–0	Carlisle United	2 September 1964
Stockport County	1–3	Rochdale	2 September 1964
Tranmere Rovers	2–0	Crewe Alexandra	2 September 1964
Walsall	1–1	Oxford United	2 September 1964
Workington	9–1	Barrow	2 September 1964

=== Replays ===
Home team	Score	Away team	Date
Carlisle United	1–0	Southport	14 September 1964
Millwall	1–0	Brighton & Hove Albion	9 September 1964
Oxford United	6–1	Walsall	7 September 1964
Torquay United	3–0	Colchester United	10 September 1964

== Second round ==
=== Ties ===
Home team	Score	Away team	Date
Birmingham City	0–3	Chelsea	23 September 1964
Blackpool	3–0	Newcastle United	23 September 1964
Bolton Wanderers	1–5	Blackburn Rovers	23 September 1964
Bournemouth & Boscombe Athletic	0–2	Northampton Town	23 September 1964
Bristol Rovers	0–2	Chesterfield	22 September 1964
Bury	1–0	Darlington	23 September 1964
Carlisle United	4–1	Bristol City	23 September 1964
Charlton Athletic	2–1	Middlesbrough	23 September 1964
Chester	5–4	Derby County	23 September 1964
Coventry City	4–1	Ipswich Town	23 September 1964
Doncaster Rovers	1–0	Preston North End	23 September 1964
Exeter City	3–5	Bradford City	23 September 1964
Fulham	2–0	Oxford United	23 September 1964
Grimsby Town	3–1	Oldham Athletic	23 September 1964
Hull City	0–0	Southend United	22 September 1964
Leeds United	3–2	Huddersfield Town	23 September 1964
Leicester City	0–0	Peterborough United	23 September 1964
Leyton Orient	3–0	Barnsley	23 September 1964
Luton Town	0–1	Aston Villa	23 September 1964
Manchester City	3–5	Mansfield Town	23 September 1964
Millwall	1–2	Norwich City	23 September 1964
Plymouth Argyle	2–1	Sheffield United	23 September 1964
Reading	4–0	Queens Park Rangers	23 September 1964
Rotherham United	2–0	Rochdale	23 September 1964
Scunthorpe United	0–1	Workington	23 September 1964
Southampton	3–2	Cardiff City	23 September 1964
Stoke City	1–1	Shrewsbury Town	23 September 1964
Sunderland	4–1	West Ham United	30 September 1964
Swansea Town	3–1	Swindon Town	23 September 1964
Torquay United	1–2	Notts County	23 September 1964
Tranmere Rovers	0–2	Crystal Palace	23 September 1964
Watford	2–2	Portsmouth	22 September 1964

=== Replays ===
Home team	Score	Away team	Date
Peterborough United	0–2	Leicester City	8 October 1964
Portsmouth	2–1	Watford	12 October 1964
Shrewsbury Town	0–1	Stoke City	29 September 1964
Southend United	3–1	Hull City	28 September 1964

== Third round ==
=== Ties ===
Home team	Score	Away team	Date
Bury	0–1	Plymouth Argyle	14 October 1964
Charlton Athletic	2–1	Leyton Orient	14 October 1964
Chelsea	4–0	Notts County	26 October 1964
Chesterfield	3–1	Carlisle United	14 October 1964
Coventry City	3–2	Mansfield Town	14 October 1964
Crystal Palace	2–0	Southampton	26 October 1964
Doncaster Rovers	2–3	Bradford City	14 October 1964
Grimsby Town	0–5	Leicester City	19 October 1964
Leeds United	2–3	Aston Villa	14 October 1964
Northampton Town	2–1	Portsmouth	20 October 1964
Norwich City	5–3	Chester	21 October 1964
Reading	1–1	Fulham	14 October 1964
Rotherham United	2–2	Swansea Town	14 October 1964
Stoke City	3–1	Southend United	14 October 1964
Sunderland	4–1	Blackpool	26 October 1964
Workington	0–0	Blackburn Rovers	14 October 1964

=== Replays ===
Home team	Score	Away team	Date
Blackburn Rovers	1–5	Workington	22 October 1964
Fulham	1–3	Reading	19 October 1964
Swansea Town	2–0	Rotherham United	28 October 1964

== Fourth round ==
=== Ties ===
Home team	Score	Away team	Date
Aston Villa	3–1	Reading	4 November 1964
Charlton Athletic	0–1	Bradford City	4 November 1964
Chelsea	3–2	Swansea Town	11 November 1964
Coventry City	4–2	Sunderland	10 November 1964
Leicester City	0–0	Crystal Palace	4 November 1964
Northampton Town	4–1	Chesterfield	4 November 1964
Stoke City	1–1	Plymouth Argyle	4 November 1964
Workington	3–0	Norwich City	4 November 1964

=== Replays ===
Home team	Score	Away team	Date
Crystal Palace	1–2	Leicester City	11 November 1964
Plymouth Argyle	3–1	Stoke City	11 November 1964

== Fifth Round ==
=== Ties ===
Home team	Score	Away team	Date
Aston Villa	7–1	Bradford City	23 November 1964
Coventry City	1–8	Leicester City	1 December 1964
Plymouth Argyle	1–0	Northampton Town	25 November 1964
Workington	2–2	Chelsea	25 November 1964

=== Replay ===
Home team	Score	Away team	Date
Chelsea	2–0	Workington	16 December 1964

== Semi-finals ==
=== First leg ===
Home team	Score	Away team	Date
Aston Villa	2–3	Chelsea	20 January 1965
Leicester City	3–2	Plymouth Argyle	20 January 1965

=== Second leg ===
Home team	Score	Away team	Date	Agg
Chelsea	1–1	Aston Villa	10 February 1965	4–3
Plymouth Argyle	0–1	Leicester City	10 February 1965	2–4

== Final ==
15 March 1965
19.30

Chelsea	3–2	Leicester City
Tambling 33'; Venables 70' (pen.); McCreadie 81'		Appleton 46'; Goodfellow 75'

Stamford Bridge, London
Attendance: 20,690
Referee: Jim Finney (Hereford)
5 April 1965

Leicester City	0–0	Chelsea
	Summary

Filbert Street, Leicester
Attendance: 26,957

Chelsea win 3–2 on aggregate.
