= Stuart Boam =

English footballer (1948–2025)

Personal information
- Full name: Stuart William Boam
- Date of birth: 28 January 1948
- Place of birth: Kirkby-in-Ashfield, England
- Date of death: 4 November 2025 (aged 77)
- Place of death: Kirkby-in-Ashfield, England
- Height: 6 ft 1/2 in (1.84 m)
- Position: Central defender

Youth career
- Mansfield Town

Senior career*
Years	Team	Apps	(Gls)
1966–1971	Mansfield Town	175	(3)
1971–1979	Middlesbrough	322	(14)
1979–1981	Newcastle United	69	(1)
1981–1983	Mansfield Town	15	(1)
1983	Hartlepool United	1	(0)
Total		582	(19)

Managerial career
- 1981–1983: Mansfield Town
- * Club domestic league appearances and goals

Stuart William Boam (28 January 1948 – 4 November 2025) was an English football player and coach.

== Career ==
Boam grew up in Kirkby-in-Ashfield, Nottinghamshire, and began his career at his local club Mansfield Town where he signed a professional contract in July 1966, and made his first-team debut against Leyton Orient on 12 May 1967, the final day of the 1966–67 season.

The following season, 19-year-old Boam established himself as a regular in the heart of Mansfield's defence, and was ever-present in the team in both the 1968–69 and 1969–70 seasons. On 26 February 1969, he was a member of the Mansfield team that made national headlines with a shock 3–0 win against West Ham United in the fifth round of the FA Cup.

Boam's consistent performances for Mansfield eventually caught the eye of bigger clubs, and in June 1971 he was sold to Middlesbrough for £50,000. He was immediately placed in Boro's starting line-up, and was named team captain ahead of the 1973–74 season, when Middlesbrough won the Second Division title. In eight years at Ayresome Park, Boam played nearly 400 games for Middlesbrough, and was rarely out of the side.

His association with Middlesbrough came to an end in August 1979, when he was sold to North East rivals Newcastle United for £170,000. In July 1981, Boam returned to Mansfield, where he was named player-manager. However, a back injury restricted his playing role to a handful of appearances, and as manager he failed to get the expected results, finishing fifth from bottom of Division Four in his only full season in charge. He was sacked as manager in January 1983, and finished his career with a short spell at Hartlepool United.

== Death ==
Boam died on 4 November 2025.
