= Dave Thompson (footballer, born 1945) =

English footballer

Personal information
- Date of birth: 12 March 1945 (age 81)
- Place of birth: Scotton, England
- Position: Right winger

Senior career*
Years	Team	Apps	(Gls)
1962–1965	Wolverhampton Wanderers	8	(1)
1966–1970	Southampton	23	(0)
1970–1974	Mansfield Town	131	(21)
1974	Chesterfield	14	(3)
Total		176	(25)
- * Club domestic league appearances and goals

David Thompson (born 12 March 1945) is an English former professional footballer who played in the Football League, as a right winger.
