= John Stenson =

English footballer

Personal information
- Full name: John Andrew Stenson
- Date of birth: 16 December 1949 (age 76)
- Place of birth: Catford, London, England
- Height: 1.75 m (5 ft 9 in)
- Position: Midfielder

Youth career
- Charlton Athletic

Senior career*
Years	Team	Apps	(Gls)
1967–1969	Charlton Athletic	11	(0)
1969–1972	Mansfield Town	107	(21)
1971–1972	→ Peterborough United (loan)	2	(0)
1972–1974	Aldershot	45	(4)
1974	Denver Dynamos	9	(0)
1974–1975	Basingstoke Town		
Total		183	(25)
- * Club domestic league appearances and goals

John Andrew Stenson (born 16 December 1949) is an English footballer who played as a midfielder in the Football League for Charlton Athletic, Mansfield Town, Peterborough United and Aldershot and in the NASL for Denver Dynamos.
