= Graham Brown (footballer, born 1944) =

English footballer and scout

Personal information
- Full name: Graham Cummings Brown
- Date of birth: 21 March 1944 (age 82)
- Place of birth: Matlock, Derbyshire, England
- Height: 6 ft 1 1/2 in (1.87 m)
- Position: Goalkeeper

Senior career*
Years	Team	Apps	(Gls)
–1964	Crawley Town		
1964–	Millwall	0	(0)
–1969	Crawley Town		
1969–1974	Mansfield Town	142	(0)
1974–1975	Doncaster Rovers	53	(0)
1975–1976	Portland Timbers	21	(0)
1976	Swansea City	4	(0)
1976	Southport		
1977	Portland Timbers	3	(0)
1977–1980	York City	69	(0)
1980–1982	Rotherham United	31	(0)
1982	→ Brighton & Hove Albion (loan)	0	(0)
1982	→ Watford (loan)	0	(0)
1982	Mansfield Town	1	(0)
1982–1983	Boston United	5	(0)
Total		329	(0)
- * Club domestic league appearances and goals

Graham Cummings Brown (born 21 March 1944) is an English former professional footballer who played as a goalkeeper in the Football League for Mansfield Town, Doncaster Rovers, Swansea City, York City and Rotherham United, in the North American Soccer League for Portland Timbers, in non-League football for Crawley Town, Southport and Boston United and was on the books of Millwall, Brighton & Hove Albion and Watford without making a league appearance. After retiring, he worked as chief scout at Rotherham and Oldham Athletic.

== Honours ==
Rotherham United

- Football League Third Division: 1980–81
