= Jimmy Goodfellow (footballer, born 1938) =

Scottish football player

Personal information
- Full name: James Boyd Goodfellow
- Date of birth: 30 July 1938
- Place of birth: Edinburgh, Scotland
- Date of death: 1 April 2011 (aged 72)
- Height: 5 ft 8 in (1.73 m)
- Position: Midfielder

Senior career*
Years	Team	Apps	(Gls)
1956–1958	Tranent Juniors		
1958–1963	Third Lanark	117	(30)
1963–1967	Leicester City	98	(26)
1967–1971	Mansfield Town	99	(14)
1971	Weymouth		
1972	Durham City		
1973	Nuneaton Borough		
1974	AP Leamington		
Total		314	(70)

International career
1962	SFL trial v SFA	1	(0)
- * Club domestic league appearances and goals

James Boyd Goodfellow (30 July 1938 – 1 April 2011) was a Scottish footballer who played for Third Lanark, Leicester City and Mansfield Town.

== Honours ==
Leicester City

- Football League Cup runner-up: 1964–65
