= Dai Jones (footballer, born 1941) =

Welsh footballer

Personal information
- Date of birth: 31 March 1941 (age 85)
- Place of birth: Neath, Wales
- Height: 5 ft 9 in (1.75 m)
- Position: Forward

Senior career*
Years	Team	Apps	(Gls)
- Ton Pentre
1963–1965	Millwall	13	(3)
1965–1967	Newport County	81	(25)
1967–1972	Mansfield Town	130	(32)
1972–1974	Newport County	47	(12)
- Bath City
- Trowbridge Town
Total		271	(72)
- * Club domestic league appearances and goals

Dai Jones (born 31 March 1941) is a Welsh footballer who played as a forward in the Football League.
