= Sandy Pate =

Scottish footballer

Personal information
- Full name: Alexander Montgomerie Pate
- Date of birth: 15 August 1944 (age 82)
- Place of birth: Lennoxtown, Scotland
- Height: 5 ft 10 in (1.78 m)
- Position: Defender

Youth career
- Renfrew FC

Senior career*
| Years | Team | Apps | (Gls) |
| 1965–1967 | Watford | 15 | (0) |
| 1967–1978 | Mansfield Town | 413 | (2) |
| Total | | 428 | (2) |
- * Club domestic league appearances and goals

Alexander Montgomerie "Sandy" Pate (born 15 August 1944) is a retired footballer who spent the majority of his career at Mansfield Town. His position on the pitch was right-back.

Pate began his career at Scottish junior side Renfrew FC, and was signed by Watford in 1965. He had played as a right-winger in his younger days, but was converted into a right-back at Watford, where he remained a reserve behind player-manager Ken Furphy, a right-back himself.

In October 1967, Pate was signed by Mansfield Town, and immediately put into the side by manager Tommy Eggleston. On 26 February 1969, Pate was a member of the Mansfield side that picked up a shock 3–0 win against West Ham United in the fifth round of the FA Cup to reach the quarter-finals for the first time in the club's history.

Pate remained at Field Mill until 1978, and was a member of the Mansfield teams that won the Fourth and Third division titles in 1975 and 1977 respectively, before retiring from the game at the end of 1977-78, Mansfield's only season at the second tier of English football.

At the time of his retirement, Pate had made a club-record 479 first-team appearances for the club (413 of those in league competition). The record has since been broken by his teammate Rod Arnold, but Pate remains in second place on Mansfield's all-time appearance list. He still lives in the Mansfield area. Included in his 479 first team appearances is seven year, run of 366 consecutive appearances in all competitions. Sandy still remains a loyal supporter of the club and still follows Mansfield both home and away and rightly so is still regarded a club legend.

In June 2009, Pate was honoured by the club when the supporters' bar at the club's Field Mill ground was renamed the Sandy Pate Bar.
