= Dudley Roberts =

English footballer (1945–2024)

Personal information
- Full name: Dudley Edward Roberts
- Date of birth: 16 October 1945
- Place of birth: Derby, England
- Date of death: 3 July 2024 (aged 78)
- Height: 6 ft 1 in (1.85 m)
- Position: Striker

Senior career*
Years	Team	Apps	(Gls)
1963–1968	Coventry City	12	(6)
1968–1974	Mansfield Town	200	(66)
1973	→ Doncaster Rovers (loan)	7	(0)
1974–1976	Scunthorpe United	59	(17)
Total		278	(89)
- * Club domestic league appearances and goals

Dudley Edward Roberts (16 October 1945 – 3 July 2024) was an English footballer who played in The Football League for four clubs in the 1960s and 1970s. He was a tall centre-forward who is probably best remembered from his six-year spell at Mansfield Town.

Roberts was born in Derby, the son of former Coventry City striker Ted Roberts. He began his career at his father's old club, signing a professional contract in November 1963. However, despite a good goalscoring record, he only played a handful of games for the Sky Blues, and moved to Mansfield Town in March 1968, making his debut against Brighton & Hove Albion.

Roberts' greatest moment of fame came on 26 February 1969, when Roberts scored the first goal in Mansfield's shock 3–0 win against West Ham United in the fifth round of the FA Cup. The following year, he had a goal disallowed when Mansfield lost 2–0 against Leeds United, also in the fifth round of the FA Cup. He also had a goal disallowed in the goalless draw against Liverpool the same year in the League Cup, denying Mansfield a famous victory.

In league competition, Roberts was Mansfield's top scorer in 1969–70 and 1970–71. He scored four goals in Mansfield's 6–2 win against Tranmere Rovers on 27 February 1971, and also scored a hat-trick on two other occasions.

Roberts left Mansfield in the February 1974, having scored 73 goals in 230 games for the club. He subsequently joined Scunthorpe United. He also had a short loan spell at Doncaster Rovers in early 1973. He retired from the game in 1976 due to injury, and settled in the Mansfield area.

Roberts died on 6 July 2024, at the age of 78.
