= 1971–72 UEFA Cup =

Inaugural season of Europe's secondary club football tournament organised by UEFA

Tournament details
- Dates: 14 September 1971 – 17 May 1972
- Teams: 63 (from 31 associations)

Final positions
- Champions: (England) Tottenham Hotspur (1st title)
- Runners-up: (England) Wolverhampton Wanderers

Tournament statistics
- Matches played: 122
- Goals scored: 368 (3.02 per match)
- Attendance: 2,110,102 (17,296 per match)
- Top scorer(s): Ludwig Bründl (Eintracht Braunschweig); 10 goals

The 1971–72 UEFA Cup was the inaugural season of the UEFA Cup, now known as the UEFA Europa League, which became the third club football competition organised by UEFA. The tournament retained the structure and format of the Inter-Cities Fairs Cup, which ran from 1955 to 1971 and had been held independently of UEFA by an organizing committee composed mostly of FIFA executives.

The final was played in England over two legs, at Molineux Stadium, Wolverhampton, and at White Hart Lane, London. The first UEFA Cup was won by Tottenham Hotspur, who defeated Wolverhampton Wanderers by an aggregate result of 3–2.

English clubs had won the last four editions of the Inter-Cities Fairs Cup. This was the first ever European final between two clubs from England, a feat that would not be repeated until the 2008 UEFA Champions League final. This was Wolverhampton's lone appearance in a European final, and Tottenham's second European title, nine years after their success in the European Cup Winners' Cup.

== Background and changes ==
The Inter-Cities Fairs Cup was created in 1955, having actually started a few months earlier than the UEFA-organised European Cup during the summer. The 'Fairs Cup', as it came to be known, was intended to provide a competitive background for matches between the representative teams of cities that hosted international trade fairs, which were being held in the previous years. As such, its calendar was highly irregular, with the first two editions being played over a five-year span.

The tournament had the backing of several influential football officials. This included FIFA Executive Committee members Ernst Thommen, who was the president of the Swiss Football Association, as well as Sir Stanley Rous and Ottorino Barassi. With no further need for international governance, the Inter-Cities Fairs Cup was internally regulated, from the referees to the disciplinary measures, and no coordination at all with the European Cup. At first, UEFA gave no further attention to the concept, as it was also immersed from 1957 onwards in taking over the International Youth Tournament (nowadays, the UEFA European Under-19 Championship) thad had been initiated by FIFA.

This approach changed at the start of the 1960s as UEFA structures consolidated, being tasked by the FIFA statues to bring order to European competitions. In 1961, UEFA took over the European Cup Winners Cup after its inaugural edition, and, in 1962, devised a plan to streamline the continental calendars and its competitions. A new ruling stated that "competitions open to the clubs of all National Associations affiliated to UEFA may only be organized by UEFA itself". However, this was not initially enforced with the Inter-Cities Fairs Cup, due to its good reputation and the influence held by its organisers. In the meantime, the competition had adjusted to an annual schedule, while club teams quickly replaced city teams.

By 1964, the belief within the UEFA Executive Committee was that the competition "should be governed and organised by UEFA itself", to ensure consistency over the rules, refereeing and disciplinary matters. An initial proposal by the Scottish Football Association for UEFA to take over the tournament fell through by 15 votes to 5, due to the opposition of Sir Stanley Rous in his new role as FIFA president, and the support of the Football Association. However, when Scotland submitted a new proposal in 1966, the English association did agree that time, and the motion was narrowly passed by 11 votes to 10 despite the efforts of Rous to prevent it.

Owing to the minimal margin between both positions, UEFA agreed to enter a negotiation period with the Inter-Cities Fairs Cup organizers. The terms were finally approved in 1968, and UEFA was due to take over for the 1969–70 edition. However, just a few months prior, most of the member association presidents agreed to extend the 'transitional period', which lasted for two further years. The tournament was then renamed as the UEFA Cup.

The main changes came with the entry criteria. Teams would no longer be bound to their city being host to an international trade fair, and multiple teams from the same city could be entered. Qualification for the UEFA Cup was devised purely on sporting merits, either by the highest-placed European teams that had not qualified for the European Cup or UEFA Cup Winners' Cup, or by winning a secondary cup competition, such as a league cup. Initially, the lone exception to the rule came from England, which still applied the 'one city, one team' rule until UEFA imposed the standard qualification procedure in 1975. Otherwise, the UEFA Cup retained the same 64-team, five knock-out rounds format for a two-legged final, with multiple teams from Europe's strongest leagues.

== Association team allocation ==
A total of 64 teams from 32 UEFA member associations were entered in the 1971–72 UEFA Cup. As the 'trade fair' requirement was abolished, teams from the Soviet Union, Cyprus and Albania were admitted for the first time, which required further modifications into the allocation scheme previously set up by the Inter-Cities Fairs Cup.

- 4 associations have four teams qualify.
- 5 associations have three teams qualify.
- 10 associations have two teams qualify.
- 13 associations have one team qualify.

Due to the newly entered associations, Belgium, Scotland and Yugoslavia lost the fourth berth they had gained the previous season, while England went back from five to four teams as the 'title holders' extra berth was not needed. Denmark and Greece also lost their second UEFA Cup berth, and East Germany regained their second berth, while Sweden and Bulgaria were also granted a second berth.

Associations in the 1971–72 UEFA Cup

Four teams
England
Italy
West Germany
Spain

Three teams
Scotland
Belgium
Portugal
(Socialist Federal Republic of Yugoslavia) Yugoslavia
France

Two teams
| Hungary | Poland |
| Czechoslovakia | Netherlands |
| East Germany | Bulgaria |
| Romania | Austria |
| Switzerland | Sweden |

One team
| Soviet Union | Turkey |
| Greece | Northern Ireland |
| Denmark | Norway |
| Republic of Ireland | Malta |
| Finland | Luxembourg |
| Iceland | Cyprus |

Did not compete
Wales
Albania

Wales: There was no national league in Wales before 1992 and the only competition organised by the Football Association of Wales was the Welsh Cup so Wales had just a single participant in European competitions, the winner (or best placed Welsh team as several English teams also competed) of the Welsh Cup which competed in the UEFA Cup Winners' Cup.

=== Teams ===
The labels in the parentheses show how each team qualified for competition:

- TH: Title holders
- CW: Cup winners
- CR: Cup runners-up
- LC: League Cup winners
- 2nd, 3rd, 4th, 5th, 6th, etc.: League position
- P-W: End-of-season European competition play-offs winners

Qualified teams for 1971–72 UEFA Cup
| (England) Leeds United (2nd) | (England) Tottenham Hotspur (3rd) | (England) Wolverhampton Wanderers (4th) | (England) Southampton (7th) |
| (Italy) Milan (2nd) | (Italy) Napoli (3rd) | (Italy) Juventus (4th) | (Italy) Bologna (5th) |
| (West Germany) Hertha BSC (3rd) | (West Germany) Eintracht Braunschweig (4th) | (West Germany) Hamburg (5th) | (West Germany) Köln (CR) |
| (Spain) Atlético Madrid (3rd) | (Spain) Real Madrid (4th) | (Spain) Athletic Bilbao (5th) | (Spain) Celta de Vigo (6th) |
| (Scotland) Aberdeen (2nd) | (Scotland) St Johnstone (3rd) | (Scotland) Dundee (5th) | (Belgium) Club Brugge (2nd) |
| (Belgium) Anderlecht (3rd) | (Belgium) Lierse (4th) | (Portugal) Porto (3rd) | (Portugal) Vitória de Setúbal (4th) |
| (Portugal) Académica (5th) | (France) Saint-Étienne (2nd) | (France) Nantes (3rd) | (France) Nîmes (4th) |
| (Socialist Federal Republic of Yugoslavia) Željezničar (2nd) | (Socialist Federal Republic of Yugoslavia) Dinamo Zagreb (3rd) | (Socialist Federal Republic of Yugoslavia) OFK Beograd (4th) | (Hungary) Ferencváros (2nd) |
| (Hungary) Vasas (3rd) | (Poland) Legia Warsaw (2nd) | (Poland) Zagłębie Wałbrzych (3rd) | (Czechoslovakia) Košice (2nd) |
| (Czechoslovakia) Union Teplice (3rd) | (Netherlands) ADO Den Haag (3rd) | (Netherlands) PSV Eindhoven (4th) | (East Germany) Carl Zeiss Jena (2nd) |
| (East Germany) Hallescher FC (3rd) | (Bulgaria) Botev Vratsa (3rd) | (Bulgaria) Lokomotiv Plovdiv (4th) | (Romania) Rapid București (2nd) |
| (Romania) UTA Arad (4th) | Austria Salzburg (2nd) | (Austria) Rapid Wien (3rd) | (Switzerland) Basel (2nd) |
| (Switzerland) Lugano (3rd) | (Sweden) Djurgården (3rd) | (Sweden) Elfsborg (4th) | (Soviet Union) Spartak Moscow (3rd) |
| (Turkey) Fenerbahçe (2nd) | (Greece) Panionios (2nd) | (Northern Ireland) Glentoran (2nd) | (Denmark) AB (2nd) |
| (Norway) Rosenborg (2nd) | (Republic of Ireland) Shelbourne (LC) | (Albania) Vllaznia (3rd) | (Malta) Marsa (2nd) |
| (Finland) HIFK Helsinki (3rd) | (Luxembourg) Aris Bonnevoie (2nd) | (Iceland) Keflavík (3rd) | (Cyprus) Akritas (2nd) |

Notes

1. West Germany: The fourth UEFA Cup spot for West Germany was not awarded to the fourth best team not qualified for the European Cup or the European Cup Winners' Cup, which was Schalke 04, as it was common practice. Instead, this place was awarded to Köln, who had been runners-up in the 1970–71 DFB-Pokal.
2. Albania: With the advent of the UEFA Cup, Vllaznia became the first Albanian team entered in the tournament, but it was later withdrawn from its first round match-up. Although previous information incorrectly attributed the withdrawal on Austrian immigration officials not giving visas to the team, Vllaznia was actually banned from competing by Albanian authorities, as reported in the Albanian press by members of the team. This was part of a wider ban involving all sports teams of KF Vllaznia, after its men's volleyball team came back from a tour in the Yugoslav region of Kosovo with gifts and expensive items, which were strictly regulated or banned under the rule of Communist Albania. Vllaznia was locally excluded for international competitions for two seasons; UEFA, on the other hand, banned Albania from the UEFA Cup for one year, and extended the ban to the European Cup when Vllaznia was not allowed to participate as champions.

== Schedule ==
The schedule of the competition was as follows. Matches were primarily scheduled for Wednesdays, though some matches took place on Tuesdays and Thursdays.

Schedule for 1971–72 UEFA Cup
| Round | First leg | Second leg |
|---|---|---|
| First round | 14–22 September 1971 | 28 September – 6 October 1971 |
| Second round | 19–21 October 1971 | 2–4 November 1971 |
| Third round | 23 November – 8 December 1971 | 8–15 December 1971 |
| Quarter-finals | 23 February – 9 March 1972 | 7–22 March 1972 |
| Semi-finals | 5 April 1972 | 19 April 1972 |
| Final | 3 May 1972 | 17 May 1972 |

== Bracket ==
First round
(Northern Ireland) Glentoran | 0 | 1
(West Germany) Eintracht Braunschweig | 1 | 6
(England) Southampton | 2 | 0
(Spain) Athletic Bilbao | 1 | 2
(Turkey) Fenerbahçe | 1 | 1
(Hungary) Ferencváros | 1 | 3
(Spain) Atlético Madrid | 2 | 0
(Greece) Panionios (a) | 1 | 1
(West Germany) Hamburger SV | 2 | 0
(Scotland) St Johnstone | 1 | 3
(Hungary) Vasas | 1 | 1
(Republic of Ireland) Shelbourne | 0 | 1
(Socialist Federal Republic of Yugoslavia) Željezničar | 3 | 1
(Belgium) Club Brugge | 0 | 3
(Italy) Bologna | 1 | 2
(Belgium) Anderlecht | 1 | 0
(Socialist Federal Republic of Yugoslavia) Dinamo Zagreb | 6 | 2
(Bulgaria) Botev Vratsa | 1 | 1
(Austria) Rapid Wien (w/o)
(Albania) Vllaznia
(Malta) Marsa | 0 | 0
(Italy) Juventus | 6 | 5
(Spain) Celta Vigo | 0 | 0
(Scotland) Aberdeen | 2 | 1
(Socialist Federal Republic of Yugoslavia) OFK Beograd | 4 | 2
(Sweden) Djurgården | 1 | 2
(East Germany) Carl Zeiss Jena | 3 | 1
(Bulgaria) Lokomotiv Plovdiv | 0 | 3
(Netherlands) ADO Den Haag | 5 | 2
(Luxembourg) Aris Bonnevoie | 0 | 2
(England) Wolverhampton Wanderers | 3 | 4
(Portugal) Académica | 0 | 1
(Poland) Zagłębie Wałbrzych | 1 | 3
(Czechoslovakia) Teplice | 0 | 2
(Romania) UTA Arad | 4 | 1
Austria Salzburg | 1 | 3
(Soviet Union) Spartak Moscow | 2 | 1
(Czechoslovakia) Košice | 0 | 2
(Portugal) Vitória de Setúbal (a) | 1 | 1
(France) Nîmes | 0 | 2
(Portugal) Porto | 0 | 1
(France) Nantes | 2 | 1
(Iceland) Keflavík | 1 | 0
(England) Tottenham Hotspur | 6 | 9
(Italy) Napoli | 1 | 0
(Romania) Rapid București | 0 | 2
(Switzerland) Lugano | 1 | 0
(Poland) Legia Warsaw | 3 | 0
(Italy) Milan | 4 | 3
(Cyprus) Akritas | 0 | 0
(West Germany) Hertha BSC | 3 | 4
(Sweden) Elfsborg | 1 | 1
(France) Saint-Étienne | 1 | 1
(West Germany) 1. FC Köln | 1 | 2
(Scotland) Dundee | 4 | 1
(Denmark) AB | 2 | 0
(Switzerland) Basel | 1 | 1
(Spain) Real Madrid | 2 | 2
(East Germany) Chemie Halle | 0
(Netherlands) PSV Eindhoven (w/o) | 0
(Norway) Rosenborg | 3 | 1
(Finland) HIFK | 0 | 0
(Belgium) Lierse | 0 | 4
(England) Leeds United | 2 | 0

Second round
(West Germany) Eintracht Braunschweig | 2 | 2
(Spain) Athletic Bilbao | 1 | 2
(Hungary) Ferencváros (w/o) | 6
(Greece) Panionios | 0
(Scotland) St Johnstone | 2 | 0
(Hungary) Vasas | 0 | 1
(Socialist Federal Republic of Yugoslavia) Željezničar (a) | 1 | 2
(Italy) Bologna | 1 | 2
(Socialist Federal Republic of Yugoslavia) Dinamo Zagreb | 2 | 0
(Austria) Rapid Wien (a) | 2 | 0
(Italy) Juventus | 2 | 1
(Scotland) Aberdeen | 0 | 1
(Socialist Federal Republic of Yugoslavia) OFK Beograd | 1 | 0
(East Germany) Carl Zeiss Jena | 1 | 4
(Netherlands) ADO Den Haag | 1 | 0
(England) Wolverhampton Wanderers | 3 | 4
(Poland) Zagłębie Wałbrzych | 1 | 1
(Romania) UTA Arad (a.e.t.) | 1 | 2
(Soviet Union) Spartak Moscow | 0 | 0
(Portugal) Vitória de Setúbal | 0 | 4
(France) Nantes | 0 | 0
(England) Tottenham Hotspur | 0 | 1
(Romania) Rapid București | 4 | 0
(Poland) Legia Warsaw | 0 | 2
(Italy) Milan | 4 | 1
(West Germany) Hertha BSC | 2 | 2
(West Germany) 1. FC Köln | 2 | 2
(Scotland) Dundee | 1 | 4
(Spain) Real Madrid | 3 | 0
(Netherlands) PSV Eindhoven (a) | 1 | 2
(Norway) Rosenborg | 4 | 0
(Belgium) Lierse (a) | 1 | 3

Third round
(West Germany) Eintracht Braunschweig | 1 | 2
(Hungary) Ferencváros | 1 | 5
(Scotland) St Johnstone | 1 | 1
(Socialist Federal Republic of Yugoslavia) Željezničar | 0 | 5
(Austria) Rapid Wien | 0 | 1
(Italy) Juventus | 1 | 4
(East Germany) Carl Zeiss Jena | 0 | 0
(England) Wolverhampton Wanderers | 1 | 3
(Romania) UTA Arad | 3 | 0
(Portugal) Vitória de Setúbal | 0 | 1
(England) Tottenham Hotspur | 3 | 2
(Romania) Rapid București | 0 | 0
(Italy) Milan | 3 | 0
(Scotland) Dundee | 0 | 2
(Netherlands) PSV Eindhoven | 1 | 0
(Belgium) Lierse | 0 | 4

Quarter-finals
(Hungary) Ferencváros (p) | 1 | 2 (5)
(Socialist Federal Republic of Yugoslavia) Željezničar | 2 | 1 (4)
(Italy) Juventus | 1 | 1
(England) Wolverhampton Wanderers | 1 | 2
(Romania) UTA Arad | 0 | 1
(England) Tottenham Hotspur | 2 | 1
(Italy) Milan | 2 | 1
(Belgium) Lierse | 0 | 1

Semi-finals
(Hungary) Ferencváros | 2 | 1
(England) Wolverhampton Wanderers | 2 | 2
Final
(England) Wolverhampton Wanderers | 1 | 1
(England) Tottenham Hotspur | 2 | 1
(England) Tottenham Hotspur | 2 | 1
(Italy) Milan | 1 | 1

== First round ==
Teams from the same nation could not be drawn against one another.

=== Summary ===
| Team 1 | Agg. | Team 2 | 1st leg | 2nd leg |
|---|---|---|---|---|
| Rapid Wien (Austria) | (w/o)^{1} | (Albania) Vllaznia | — | — |
| Fenerbahçe (Turkey) | 2–4 | (Hungary) Ferencváros | 1–1 | 1–3 |
| ADO Den Haag (Netherlands) | 7–2 | (Luxembourg) Aris Bonnevoie | 5–0 | 2–2 |
| Keflavík (Iceland) | 1–15 | (England) Tottenham Hotspur | 1–6^{2} | 0–9 |
| Glentoran (Northern Ireland) | 1–7 | (West Germany) Eintracht Braunschweig | 0–1 | 1–6 |
| Vitória de Setúbal (Portugal) | 2–2 (a) | (France) Nîmes | 1–0 | 1–2 |
| Carl Zeiss Jena (East Germany) | 4–3 | (Bulgaria) Lokomotiv Plovdiv | 3–0 | 1–3 |
| UTA Arad (Romania) | 5–4 | Austria Salzburg | 4–1 | 1–3 |
| OFK Beograd (Socialist Federal Republic of Yugoslavia) | 6–3 | (Sweden) Djurgården | 4–1 | 2–2 |
| Marsa (Malta) | 0–11 | (Italy) Juventus | 0–6 | 0–5 |
| Vasas (Hungary) | 2–1 | (Republic of Ireland) Shelbourne | 1–0 | 1–1 |
| Zagłębie Wałbrzych (Poland) | 4–2 | (Czechoslovakia) Teplice | 1–0 | 3–2 |
| Spartak Moscow (Soviet Union) | 3–2 | (Czechoslovakia) Košice | 2–0 | 1–2 |
| Željezničar (Socialist Federal Republic of Yugoslavia) | 4–3 | (Belgium) Club Brugge | 3–0 | 1–3 |
| Dinamo Zagreb (Socialist Federal Republic of Yugoslavia) | 8–2 | (Bulgaria) Botev Vratsa | 6–1 | 2–1 |
| Hamburger SV (West Germany) | 2–4 | (Scotland) St Johnstone | 2–1 | 0–3 |
| Hertha BSC (West Germany) | 7–2 | (Sweden) Elfsborg | 3–1 | 4–1 |
| Rosenborg (Norway) | 4–0 | (Finland) HIFK Helsinki | 3–0 | 1–0 |
| Basel (Switzerland) | 2–4 | (Spain) Real Madrid | 1–2 | 1–2 |
| Chemie Halle (East Germany) | 0–0 | (Netherlands) PSV Eindhoven | 0–0 | —^{3} |
| Lierse (Belgium) | 4–2 | (England) Leeds United | 0–2 | 4–0 |
| Celta Vigo (Spain) | 0–3 | (Scotland) Aberdeen | 0–2 | 0–1 |
| Saint-Étienne (France) | 2–3 | (West Germany) 1. FC Köln | 1–1 | 1–2 |
| Dundee (Scotland) | 5–2 | (Denmark) AB | 4–2 | 1–0 |
| Lugano (Switzerland) | 1–3 | (Poland) Legia Warsaw | 1–3 | 0–0 |
| Southampton (England) | 2–3 | (Spain) Athletic Bilbao | 2–1 | 0–2 |
| Wolverhampton Wanderers (England) | 7–1 | (Portugal) Académica | 3–0 | 4–1 |
| Napoli (Italy) | 1–2 | (Romania) Rapid București | 1–0 | 0–2 |
| Bologna (Italy) | 3–1 | (Belgium) Anderlecht | 1–1 | 2–0 |
| Porto (Portugal) | 1–3 | (France) Nantes | 0–2 | 1–1 |
| Atlético Madrid (Spain) | 2–2 (a) | (Greece) Panionios | 2–1 | 0–1 |
| Milan (Italy) | 7–0 | (Cyprus) Akritas | 4–0 | 3–0 |

^{1} Vllaznia withdrew after Albanian authorities banned the team from international competition, due to its volleyball team coming back from abroad with gifts and items that were deemed forbidden.
^{2} This match was played in Reykjavík.
^{3} Chemie Halle withdrew after the first leg following the Hotel 't Silveren Seepaerd fire.

=== Matches ===
14 September 1971
First leg

| Rapid Wien (Austria) | Cancelled | (Albania) Vllaznia |
|---|---|---|
| | Report |

Gerhard Hanappi Stadium, Vienna
6 October 1971
Second leg

| Vllaznia (Albania) | Cancelled | (Austria) Rapid Wien |
|---|---|---|
| | Report |

Vojo Kushi Stadium, Shkodër

Vllaznia withdrew after Albanian authorities banned the team from international competition, due to its volleyball team coming back from abroad with gifts and items that were deemed forbidden; Rapid Wien were awarded a walkover.

14 September 1971
18:00 (EET)
First leg

| Fenerbahçe (Turkey) | 1–1 | (Hungary) Ferencváros |
|---|---|---|
| Yaşar Mumcu 59' | Report | Kű 82' |

Mithatpaşa, İzmir
Attendance: 29,849
29 September 1971
18:30 (CET)
Second leg

| Ferencváros (Hungary) | 3–1 | (Turkey) Fenerbahçe |
|---|---|---|
| Branikovits 20', 65', 78' | Report | Birand 88' |

Népstadion, Budapest
Attendance: 11,000

Ferencváros won 4–2 on aggregate.

14 September 1971
19:00 (CET)
First leg

| ADO Den Haag (Netherlands) | 5–0 | (Luxembourg) Aris Bonnevoie |
|---|---|---|
| Kila 43', 81'; Roggeveen 48'; Couperus 52'; Mansveld 72' (pen.) | Report |

Zuiderpark Stadion, The Hague
Attendance: 6,500
28 September 1971
19:00 (CET)
Second leg

| Aris Bonnevoie (Luxembourg) | 2–2 | (Netherlands) ADO Den Haag |
|---|---|---|
| Mousel 51'; Da Silva 57' | Report | Mansveld 8'; Roggeveen 61' |

Stade Camille Polfer, Luxembourg City
Attendance: 620

ADO Den Haag won 7–2 on aggregate.

14 September 1971
First leg

| Keflavík (Iceland) | 1–6 | (England) Tottenham Hotspur |
|---|---|---|
| Júlíusson 76' | Report | Coates 25'; Gilzean 25', 64', 87'; Mullery 31', 59' |

Laugardalsvöllur, Reykjavík
Attendance: 10,887
28 September 1971
Second leg

| Tottenham Hotspur (England) | 9–0 | (Iceland) Keflavík |
|---|---|---|
| Chivers 8', 19', 44'; Perryman 24'; Coates 44'; Knowles 65'; Gilzean 77', 78'; Holder 86' | Report |

White Hart Lane, London
Attendance: 23,818

Tottenham Hotspur won 15–1 on aggregate.

14 September 1971
First leg

| Glentoran (Northern Ireland) | 0–1 | (West Germany) Eintracht Braunschweig |
|---|---|---|
| | Report | Bründl 33' |

The Oval, Belfast
Attendance: 4,056
28 September 1971
Second leg

| Eintracht Braunschweig (West Germany) | 6–1 | (Northern Ireland) Glentoran |
|---|---|---|
| Bründl 2', 8' (pen.), 23', 83', 89'; Gerwien 35' | Report | McCaffrey 4' |

Eintracht-Stadion, Braunschweig
Attendance: 11,362

Eintracht Braunschweig won 7–1 on aggregate.

14 September 1971
First leg

| Vitória de Setúbal (Portugal) | 1–0 | (France) Nîmes |
|---|---|---|
| Torres 5' (pen.) | Report |

Estádio do Bonfim, Setúbal
Attendance: 7,480
Referee: Franz Geluck (Belgium)
29 September 1971
Second leg

| Nîmes (France) | 2–1 | (Portugal) Vitória de Setúbal |
|---|---|---|
| Machado 58' (o.g.); Adams 89' | Report | Torres 24' |

Stade Jean-Bouin, Nîmes
Attendance: 13,765
Referee: Curt Nystrand (Sweden)

2–2 on aggregate. Vitória de Setúbal won on away goals.

15 September 1971
First leg

| Carl Zeiss Jena (East Germany) | 3–0 | (Bulgaria) Lokomotiv Plovdiv |
|---|---|---|
| Ducke 20' (pen.); Vogel 45', 79' (pen.) | Report |

Ernst-Abbe-Sportfeld, Jena
Attendance: 6,711
29 September 1971
Second leg

| Lokomotiv Plovdiv (Bulgaria) | 3–1 | (East Germany) Carl Zeiss Jena |
|---|---|---|
| Ankov 40'; Bonev 63', 66' | Report | Scheitler 34' |

Stadion Lokomotiv, Plovdiv
Attendance: 10,458

Carl Zeiss Jena won 4–3 on aggregate.

15 September 1971
First leg

| UTA Arad (Romania) | 4–1 | Austria Salzburg |
|---|---|---|
| Kun 33'; Broșovschi 45'; Both 56'; Domide 70' | Report | Ritter 47' |

Stadionul Francisc von Neuman, Arad
Attendance: 15,000
Referee: Christos Michas (Greece)
29 September 1971
Second leg

| Austria Salzburg | 3–1 | (Romania) UTA Arad |
|---|---|---|
| Hirnschrodt 57'; Kibler 80' (pen.); Stadler 88' | Report | Domide 28' |

Stadion Lehen, Salzburg
Attendance: 2,500
Referee: Jef F. Dropmans (Netherlands)

UTA Arad won 5–4 on aggregate.

15 September 1971
First leg

| OFK Beograd (Socialist Federal Republic of Yugoslavia) | 4–1 | (Sweden) Djurgården |
|---|---|---|
| Zec 9'; Lukić 21'; Santrač 55'; Mešanović 70' | Report | Rehnberg 77' |

Omladinski Stadium, Belgrade
Attendance: 615
Referee: Ladikli Sabahattin (Turkey)
29 September 1971
Second leg

| Djurgården (Sweden) | 2–2 | (Socialist Federal Republic of Yugoslavia) OFK Beograd |
|---|---|---|
| Rehnberg 20'; Sjöberg 85' | Report | Zec 44'; Mitrović 61' |

Stockholm Olympic Stadium, Stockholm
Attendance: 1,698
Referee: Clive Thomas (Wales)

OFK Beograd won 6–3 on aggregate.

15 September 1971
First leg

| Marsa (Malta) | 0–6 | (Italy) Juventus |
|---|---|---|
| | Report | Haller 32', 60'; Causio 54'; Novellini 63'; Capello 69'; Cuccureddu 88' |

Empire Stadium, Gżira
Attendance: 13,401
28 September 1971
Second leg

| Juventus (Italy) | 5–0 | (Malta) Marsa |
|---|---|---|
| Novellini 18', 32', 90'; Haller 45'; Furino 63' | Report |

Stadio Olimpico Grande Torino, Turin
Attendance: 8,970

Juventus won 11–0 on aggregate.

15 September 1971
First leg

| Vasas (Hungary) | 1–0 | (Republic of Ireland) Shelbourne |
|---|---|---|
| Menczel 80' | Report |

Fáy utcai Stadion, Budapest
Attendance: 2,453
Referee: Doğan Babacan (Turkey)
29 September 1971
Second leg

| Shelbourne (Republic of Ireland) | 1–1 | (Hungary) Vasas |
|---|---|---|
| Murray 80' | Report | Török 45+3' |

Dalymount Park, Dublin
Attendance: 12,000
Referee: Vital Loraux (Belgium)

Vasas won 2–1 on aggregate.

15 September 1971
First leg

| Zagłębie Wałbrzych (Poland) | 1–0 | (Czechoslovakia) Teplice |
|---|---|---|
| Galas 39' | Report |

Stadion Tysiąclecia, Wałbrzych
Attendance: 5,000
29 September 1971
Second leg

| Teplice (Czechoslovakia) | 2–3 | (Poland) Zagłębie Wałbrzych |
|---|---|---|
| Stratil 70'; Smetana 75' | Report | Kwiatkowski 65', 78'; Augustyniak 73' |

Stadion U drožďárny, Teplice
Attendance: 6,000

Zaglebie Walbrzych won 4–2 on aggregate.

15 September 1971
First leg

| Spartak Moscow (Soviet Union) | 2–0 | (Czechoslovakia) Košice |
|---|---|---|
| Silagadze 24' (pen.); Egorovich 49' | Report |

Central Lenin Stadium, Moscow
Attendance: 15,000
29 September 1971
Second leg

| Košice (Czechoslovakia) | 2–1 | (Soviet Union) Spartak Moscow |
|---|---|---|
| Švajlen 51' (pen.); Halas 84' | Report | Štovčík 6' (o.g.) |

Všešportový areál, Košice
Attendance: 22,000

Spartak Moscow won 3–2 on aggregate.

15 September 1971
First leg

| Željezničar (Socialist Federal Republic of Yugoslavia) | 3–0 | (Belgium) Club Brugge |
|---|---|---|
| Sprečo 36'; Katalinski 40'; Bukal 57' | Report |

Stadion Grbavica, Sarajevo
Attendance: 12,000
29 September 1971
Second leg

| Club Brugge (Belgium) | 3–1 | (Socialist Federal Republic of Yugoslavia) Željezničar |
|---|---|---|
| Rijnders 16'; Carteus 25', 85' | Report | Deraković 10' |

Albert Dyserynck Stadion, Bruges
Attendance: 16,000

Željezničar won 4–3 on aggregate.

15 September 1971
First leg

| Dinamo Zagreb (Socialist Federal Republic of Yugoslavia) | 6–1 | (Bulgaria) Botev Vratsa |
|---|---|---|
| Miljković 4', 10'; Vabec 14', 80'; Lalić 37'; Rora 67' | Report | Iordanov 87' |

Stadion Maksimir, Zagreb
Attendance: 5,187
29 September 1971
Second leg

| Botev Vratsa (Bulgaria) | 1–2 | (Socialist Federal Republic of Yugoslavia) Dinamo Zagreb |
|---|---|---|
| Toshkov 1' | Report | Renić 1'; Senzen 50' |

Stadion Hristo Botev, Vratsa
Attendance: 10,729

Dinamo Zagreb won 8–2 on aggregate.

15 September 1971
First leg

| Hamburger SV (West Germany) | 2–1 | (Scotland) St Johnstone |
|---|---|---|
| Zaczyk 11', 79' | Report | Pearson 53' |

Volksparkstadion, Hamburg
Attendance: 9,646
29 September 1971
Second leg

| St Johnstone (Scotland) | 3–0 | (West Germany) Hamburger SV |
|---|---|---|
| Hall 15'; Pearson 62'; Whitelaw 77' | Report |

Muirton Park, Perth
Attendance: 11,761

St Johnstone won 4–2 on aggregate.

15 September 1971
First leg

| Hertha BSC (West Germany) | 3–1 | (Sweden) Elfsborg |
|---|---|---|
| Hermandung 35'; Varga 44'; Steffenhagen 68' | Report | Rökaas 53' |

Olympiastadion, West Berlin
Attendance: 6,897
29 September 1971
Second leg

| Elfsborg (Sweden) | 1–4 | (West Germany) Hertha BSC |
|---|---|---|
| Sundh 59' | Report | Horr 43', 81'; Steffenhagen 77'; Gutzeit 83' |

Ryavallen, Borås
Attendance: 1,124

Hertha BSC won 7–2 on aggregate.

15 September 1971
First leg

| Rosenborg (Norway) | 3–0 | (Finland) HIFK Helsinki |
|---|---|---|
| Mørkved 11'; Hanssen 50'; Meirik 79' | Report |

Lerkendal Stadion, Trondheim
Attendance: 7,575
29 September 1971
Second leg

| HIFK Helsinki (Finland) | 0–1 | (Norway) Rosenborg |
|---|---|---|
| | Report | Mørkved 18' |

Helsinki Olympic Stadium, Helsinki
Attendance: 598

Rosenborg won 4–0 on aggregate.

15 September 1971
First leg

| Basel (Switzerland) | 1–2 | (Spain) Real Madrid |
|---|---|---|
| Hasler 32' | Report | Aguilar 33'; Santillana 75' |

St. Jakob Stadium, Basel
Attendance: 32,059
Referee: Ken Burns (England)
29 September 1971
Second leg

| Real Madrid (Spain) | 2–1 | (Switzerland) Basel |
|---|---|---|
| Aguilar 48'; Santillana 78' | Report | Siegenthaler 57' |

Santiago Bernabéu, Madrid
Attendance: 61,861
Referee: Aurelio Angonese (Italy)

Real Madrid won 4–2 on aggregate.

15 September 1971
First leg

| Chemie Halle (East Germany) | 0–0 | (Netherlands) PSV Eindhoven |
|---|---|---|
| | Report |

Kurt-Wabbel-Stadion, Halle
Attendance: 24,613
29 September 1971
Second leg

| PSV Eindhoven (Netherlands) | Cancelled | (East Germany) Chemie Halle |
|---|---|---|
| | Report |

De Vliert, 's-Hertogenbosch (Note: PSV played their first two home matches in 's-Hertogenbosch instead of their home stadium Philips Sportpark, Eindhoven, due to a UEFA stadium ban resulting from fans throwing beer cans on the pitch in the previous season's Cup Winners' Cup semifinal between PSV and Real Madrid.)

Chemie Halle withdrew ahead of the return leg due to the Eindhoven hotel fire that claimed the life of Halle's 21-year-old midfielder Wolfgang Hoffmann one day before the match. PSV Eindhoven were awarded a walkover.

15 September 1971
First leg

| Lierse (Belgium) | 0–2 | (England) Leeds United |
|---|---|---|
| | Report | Galvin 26'; Lorimer 57' |

Herman Vanderpoortenstadion, Lier
Attendance: 17,000
29 September 1971
Second leg

| Leeds United (England) | 0–4 | (Belgium) Lierse |
|---|---|---|
| | Report | Reaney 31' (o.g.); Ressel 35', 80'; Janssens 37' |

Elland Road, Leeds
Attendance: 18,680

Lierse won 4–2 on aggregate.

15 September 1971
First leg

| Celta Vigo (Spain) | 0–2 | (Scotland) Aberdeen |
|---|---|---|
| | Report | Harper 50'; Forrest 86' |

Balaídos, Vigo
Attendance: 11,252
29 September 1971
Second leg

| Aberdeen (Scotland) | 1–0 | (Spain) Celta Vigo |
|---|---|---|
| Harper 89' | Report |

Pittodrie Stadium, Aberdeen
Attendance: 20,142

Aberdeen won 3–0 on aggregate.

15 September 1971
First leg

| Saint-Étienne (France) | 1–1 | (West Germany) 1. FC Köln |
|---|---|---|
| Sarramagna 85' | Report | Simmet 80' |

Stade Geoffroy-Guichard, Saint-Étienne
Attendance: 25,029
28 September 1971
Second leg

| 1. FC Köln (West Germany) | 2–1 | (France) Saint-Étienne |
|---|---|---|
| Simmet 46'; Glowacz 62' | Report | Revelli 75' |

Müngersdorfer Stadion, Cologne
Attendance: 18,000

1. FC Köln won 3–2 on aggregate.

15 September 1971
First leg

| Dundee (Scotland) | 4–2 | (Denmark) AB |
|---|---|---|
| Bryce 8', 35'; Gordon 30'; Lambie 64' | Report | Carlsen 39', 39' |

Dens Park, Dundee
Attendance: 8,194
29 September 1971
Second leg

| AB (Denmark) | 0–1 | (Scotland) Dundee |
|---|---|---|
| | Report | Duncan 53' |

Københavns Idrætspark, Copenhagen
Attendance: 2,045

Dundee won 5–2 on aggregate.

15 September 1971
First leg

| Lugano (Switzerland) | 1–3 | (Poland) Legia Warsaw |
|---|---|---|
| Luttrop 83' (pen.) | Report | Ćmikiewicz 20'; Stachurski 61'; Nowak 88' |

Cornaredo Stadium, Lugano
Attendance: 3,000
29 September 1971
Second leg

| Legia Warsaw (Poland) | 0–0 | (Switzerland) Lugano |
|---|---|---|
| | Report |

Polish Army Stadium, Warsaw
Attendance: 10,000

Legia Warsaw won 3–1 on aggregate.

15 September 1971
First leg

| Southampton (England) | 2–1 | (Spain) Athletic Bilbao |
|---|---|---|
| Jenkins 64'; Channon 69' (pen.) | Report | Arieta 58' |

The Dell, Southampton
Attendance: 21,600
29 September 1971
Second leg

| Athletic Bilbao (Spain) | 2–0 | (England) Southampton |
|---|---|---|
| Ortuondo 69'; Arieta 90' | Report |

San Mamés, Bilbao
Attendance: 24,102

Athletic Bilbao won 3–2 on aggregate.

15 September 1971
First leg

| Wolverhampton Wanderers (England) | 3–0 | (Portugal) Académica |
|---|---|---|
| McAlle 28'; Richards 62'; Dougan 80' | Report |

Molineux Stadium, Wolverhampton
Attendance: 23,349
Referee: István Zsolt (Hungary)
29 September 1971
Second leg

| Académica (Portugal) | 1–4 | (England) Wolverhampton Wanderers |
|---|---|---|
| Manuel António 15' | Report | Dougan 23', 72', 90'; McAlle 57' |

Estádio Municipal de Coimbra, Coimbra
Attendance: 15,000
Referee: Laurens van Ravens (Netherlands)

Wolverhampton Wanderers won 7–1 on aggregate.

15 September 1971
First leg

| Napoli (Italy) | 1–0 | (Romania) Rapid București |
|---|---|---|
| Lupescu 75' (o.g.) | Report |

Stadio San Paolo, Naples
Attendance: 21,993
Referee: Petar Kostovski (Yugoslavia)
30 September 1971
Second leg

| Rapid București (Romania) | 2–0 | (Italy) Napoli |
|---|---|---|
| Dumitru 26'; Ene 34' | Report |

Stadionul August 23, Bucharest
Attendance: 36,000
Referee: Walter Eschweiler (West Germany)

Rapid București won 2–1 on aggregate.

15 September 1971
First leg

| Bologna (Italy) | 1–1 | (Belgium) Anderlecht |
|---|---|---|
| Perani 26' | Report | Van Himst 60' |

Stadio Comunale, Bologna
Attendance: 28,000
28 September 1971
Second leg

| Anderlecht (Belgium) | 0–2 | (Italy) Bologna |
|---|---|---|
| | Report | Savoldi 10'; Rizzo 85' |

Stade Emile Versé, Brussels
Attendance: 30,000

Bologna won 3–1 on aggregate.

15 September 1971
First leg

| Porto (Portugal) | 0–2 | (France) Nantes |
|---|---|---|
| | Report | Marcos 18', 81' |

Estádio das Antas, Porto
Attendance: 17,500
Referee: Dominic Byrne (Ireland)
29 September 1971
Second leg

| Nantes (France) | 1–1 | (Portugal) Porto |
|---|---|---|
| Maas 77' | Report | De Michèle 87' (o.g.) |

Stade Marcel-Saupin, Nantes
Attendance: 15,205
Referee: Ivan Plaček (Czechoslovakia)

Nantes won 3–1 on aggregate.

16 September 1971
First leg

| Atlético Madrid (Spain) | 2–1 | (Greece) Panionios |
|---|---|---|
| Bezerra 47'; Irureta 64' | Report | Lagos 80' |

Estadio Manzanares, Madrid
Attendance: 19,808
6 October 1971
Second leg

| Panionios (Greece) | 1–0 | (Spain) Atlético Madrid |
|---|---|---|
| Intzoglou 53' (pen.) | Report |

Karaiskakis Stadium, Piraeus
Attendance: 16,000

2–2 on aggregate. Panionios won on away goals.

22 September 1971
First leg

| Milan (Italy) | 4–0 | (Cyprus) Akritas |
|---|---|---|
| Villa 32', 60'; Magherini 34'; Golin 50' | Report |

San Siro, Milan
Attendance: 9,826
Referee: Joseph Cassar Naudi (Malta)
29 September 1971
Second leg

| Akritas (Cyprus) | 0–3 | (Italy) Milan |
|---|---|---|
| | Report | Villa 11', 11'; Rivera 65' |

Stadio Giuseppe Grezar, Trieste
Attendance: 9,928
Referee: Atanas Stavrev (Bulgaria)

Milan won 7–0 on aggregate.

== Second round ==
Teams from the same nation could not be drawn against one another.

=== Summary ===
| Team 1 | Agg. | Team 2 | 1st leg | 2nd leg |
|---|---|---|---|---|
| Rapid București (Romania) | 4–2 | (Poland) Legia Warsaw | 4–0 | 0–2 |
| 1. FC Köln (West Germany) | 4–5 | (Scotland) Dundee | 2–1 | 2–4 |
| Zagłębie Wałbrzych (Poland) | 2–3 | (Romania) UTA Arad | 1–1 | 1–2 (a.e.t.) |
| OFK Beograd (Socialist Federal Republic of Yugoslavia) | 1–5 | (East Germany) Carl Zeiss Jena | 1–1 | 0–4 |
| Dinamo Zagreb (Socialist Federal Republic of Yugoslavia) | 2–2 (a) | (Austria) Rapid Wien | 2–2 | 0–0 |
| Željezničar (Socialist Federal Republic of Yugoslavia) | 3–3 (a) | (Italy) Bologna | 1–1 | 2–2 |
| Ferencváros (Hungary) | 6–0 | (Greece) Panionios | 6–0 | —^{1} |
| Eintracht Braunschweig (West Germany) | 4–3 | (Spain) Athletic Bilbao | 2–1 | 2–2 |
| Rosenborg (Norway) | 4–4 (a) | (Belgium) Lierse | 4–1 | 0–3 |
| ADO Den Haag (Netherlands) | 1–7 | (England) Wolverhampton Wanderers | 1–3 | 0–4 |
| Nantes (France) | 0–1 | (England) Tottenham Hotspur | 0–0 | 0–1 |
| St Johnstone (Scotland) | 2–1 | (Hungary) Vasas | 2–0 | 0–1 |
| Milan (Italy) | 5–4 | (West Germany) Hertha BSC | 4–2 | 1–2 |
| Real Madrid (Spain) | 3–3 (a) | (Netherlands) PSV Eindhoven | 3–1 | 0–2^{2} |
| Spartak Moscow (Soviet Union) | 0–4 | (Portugal) Vitória de Setúbal | 0–0 | 0–4 |
| Juventus (Italy) | 3–1 | (Scotland) Aberdeen | 2–0 | 1–1 |

^{1} After the final whistle in the first leg, visiting Panionios fans invaded the pitch and attacked Ferencváros players, match officials, and Hungarian police. Panionios were ejected from the competition.
^{2} This match was played in 's-Hertogenbosch.

=== Matches ===
19 October 1971
First leg

| Rapid București (Romania) | 4–0 | (Poland) Legia Warsaw |
|---|---|---|
| Ene 23', 28'; Neagu 29', 71' | Report |

Stadionul August 23, Bucharest
Attendance: 15,000
Referee: Jozef Krňávek (Czechoslovakia)
3 November 1971
Second leg

| Legia Warsaw (Poland) | 2–0 | (Romania) Rapid București |
|---|---|---|
| Nowak 2'; Blaut 6' | Report |

Polish Army Stadium, Warsaw
Attendance: 12,000
Referee: Gyula Emsberger (Hungary)

Rapid București won 4–2 on aggregate.

19 October 1971
First leg

| 1. FC Köln (West Germany) | 2–1 | (Scotland) Dundee |
|---|---|---|
| Scheermann 50'; Löhr 84' | Report | Kinninmonth 8' |

Müngersdorfer Stadion, Cologne
Attendance: 12,896
3 November 1971
Second leg

| Dundee (Scotland) | 4–2 | (West Germany) 1. FC Köln |
|---|---|---|
| Duncan 12', 61', 74'; Wilson 89' | Report | Simmet 35'; Flohe 56' |

Dens Park, Dundee
Attendance: 15,274

Dundee won 5–4 on aggregate.

20 October 1971
First leg

| Zagłębie Wałbrzych (Poland) | 1–1 | (Romania) UTA Arad |
|---|---|---|
| Kwiatkowski 10' | Report | Broșovschi 86' |

Stadion Tysiąclecia, Wałbrzych
Attendance: 8,000
Referee: Karlo Kruashvili (Soviet Union)
3 November 1971
Second leg

| UTA Arad (Romania) | 2–1 (a.e.t.) | (Poland) Zagłębie Wałbrzych |
|---|---|---|
| Domide 13'; Kun 115' | Report | Pawłowski 67' |

Stadionul Francisc von Neuman, Arad
Attendance: 8,000
Referee: Franz Wöhrer (Austria)

UTA Arad won 3–2 on aggregate.

20 October 1971
First leg

| OFK Beograd (Socialist Federal Republic of Yugoslavia) | 1–1 | (East Germany) Carl Zeiss Jena |
|---|---|---|
| Santrač 49' | Report | Scheitler 32' |

Omladinski Stadium, Belgrade
Attendance: 6,575
3 November 1971
Second leg

| Carl Zeiss Jena (East Germany) | 4–0 | (Socialist Federal Republic of Yugoslavia) OFK Beograd |
|---|---|---|
| Mitrović 14' (o.g.); Scheitler 17', 65'; Stein 50' | Report |

Ernst-Abbe-Sportfeld, Jena
Attendance: 7,732

Carl Zeiss Jena won 5–1 on aggregate.

20 October 1971
First leg

| Dinamo Zagreb (Socialist Federal Republic of Yugoslavia) | 2–2 | (Austria) Rapid Wien |
|---|---|---|
| Kafka 6', 67' | Report | Hof 13'; Jagodic 87' |

Stadion Maksimir, Zagreb
Attendance: 18,650
3 November 1971
Second leg

| Rapid Wien (Austria) | 0–0 | (Socialist Federal Republic of Yugoslavia) Dinamo Zagreb |
|---|---|---|
| | Report |

Praterstadion, Vienna
Attendance: 10,092

2–2 on aggregate. Rapid Wien won on away goals.

20 October 1971
First leg

| Željezničar (Socialist Federal Republic of Yugoslavia) | 1–1 | (Italy) Bologna |
|---|---|---|
| Bukal 75' (pen.) | Report | Perani 30' |

Stadion Grbavica, Sarajevo
Attendance: 11,584
3 November 1971
Second leg

| Bologna (Italy) | 2–2 | (Socialist Federal Republic of Yugoslavia) Željezničar |
|---|---|---|
| Fedele 15', 71' | Report | Janković 59', 83' |

Stadio Comunale, Bologna
Attendance: 9,397

3–3 on aggregate. Željezničar won on away goals.

20 October 1971
First leg

| Ferencváros (Hungary) | 6–0 | (Greece) Panionios |
|---|---|---|
| Kű 2'; Albert 23', 62', 89'; Megyesi 67'; Branikovits 83' | Report |

Népstadion, Budapest
Attendance: 12,310
4 November 1971
Second leg

| Panionios (Greece) | Cancelled | (Hungary) Ferencváros |
|---|---|---|
| | Report |

Nea Smyrni Stadium, Athens

After the final whistle in the first leg, visiting Panionios fans invaded the pitch and attacked Ferencváros players, match officials, and Hungarian police. Panionios were ejected from the competition. Ferencváros were awarded a walkover.

20 October 1971
First leg

| Eintracht Braunschweig (West Germany) | 2–1 | (Spain) Athletic Bilbao |
|---|---|---|
| Bründl 16', 33' | Report | Arieta 15' |

Eintracht-Stadion, Braunschweig
Attendance: 9,608
3 November 1971
Second leg

| Athletic Bilbao (Spain) | 2–2 | (West Germany) Eintracht Braunschweig |
|---|---|---|
| Uriarte 35'; Rojo 89' | Report | Erler 28'; Bründl 69' |

San Mamés, Bilbao
Attendance: 27,514

Eintracht Braunschweig won 4–3 on aggregate.

20 October 1971
First leg

| Rosenborg (Norway) | 4–1 | (Belgium) Lierse |
|---|---|---|
| Christiansen 8', 72'; Hanssen 27'; Loraas 84' | Report | Davidović 67' |

Ullevaal Stadion, Oslo
Attendance: 6,115
3 November 1971
Second leg

| Lierse (Belgium) | 3–0 | (Norway) Rosenborg |
|---|---|---|
| De Nul 71', 73', 79' | Report |

Herman Vanderpoortenstadion, Lier
Attendance: 6,751

4–4 on aggregate. Lierse won on away goals.

20 October 1971
First leg

| ADO Den Haag (Netherlands) | 1–3 | (England) Wolverhampton Wanderers |
|---|---|---|
| Hestad 89' (pen.) | Report | Dougan 63'; McCalliog 74'; Hibbitt 80' |

Zuiderpark Stadion, The Hague
Attendance: 13,181
3 November 1971
Second leg

| Wolverhampton Wanderers (England) | 4–0 | (Netherlands) ADO Den Haag |
|---|---|---|
| Dougan 7'; Weimar 50' (o.g.); Mansveld 58' (o.g.); Van den Burch 89' (o.g.) | Report |

Molineux Stadium, Wolverhampton
Attendance: 20,299

Wolverhampton Wanderers won 7–1 on aggregate.

20 October 1971
First leg

| Nantes (France) | 0–0 | (England) Tottenham Hotspur |
|---|---|---|
| | Report |

Stade de la Beaujoire, Nantes
Attendance: 20,033
2 November 1971
Second leg

| Tottenham Hotspur (England) | 1–0 | (France) Nantes |
|---|---|---|
| Peters 13' | Report |

White Hart Lane, London
Attendance: 32,630

Tottenham Hotspur won 1–0 on aggregate.

20 October 1971
First leg

| St Johnstone (Scotland) | 2–0 | (Hungary) Vasas |
|---|---|---|
| Connolly 12' (pen.); Pearson 85' | Report |

Muirton Park, Perth
Attendance: 12,218
2 November 1971
Second leg

| Vasas (Hungary) | 1–0 | (Scotland) St Johnstone |
|---|---|---|
| Puskás 85' | Report |

Fáy utcai Stadion, Budapest
Attendance: 3,408

St Johnstone won 2–1 on aggregate.

20 October 1971
First leg

| Milan (Italy) | 4–2 | (West Germany) Hertha BSC |
|---|---|---|
| Prati 41', 85'; Benetti 62'; Biasiolo 65' | Report | Steffenhagen 15'; Beer 51' |

San Siro, Milan
Attendance: 16,070
Referee: Ferdinand Marschall (Austria)
3 November 1971
Second leg

| Hertha BSC (West Germany) | 2–1 | (Italy) Milan |
|---|---|---|
| Horr 15' (pen.), 89' | Report | Bigon 13' |

Olympiastadion, Berlin
Attendance: 21,123
Referee: John Carpenter (Republic of Ireland)

Milan won 5–4 on aggregate.

20 October 1971
First leg

| Real Madrid (Spain) | 3–1 | (Netherlands) PSV Eindhoven |
|---|---|---|
| Anzarda 2'; Aguilar 34'; Amancio 47' (pen.) | Report | Hoekema 22' |

Santiago Bernabéu, Madrid
Attendance: 61,274
Referee: John Paterson (Scotland)
3 November 1971
Second leg

| PSV Eindhoven (Netherlands) | 2–0 | (Spain) Real Madrid |
|---|---|---|
| Mulders 9'; Hoekema 56' | Report |

De Vliert, 's-Hertogenbosch
Attendance: 19,286
Referee: Gerhard Kunze (West Germany)

3–3 on aggregate. PSV Eindhoven won on away goals.

21 October 1971
First leg

| Spartak Moscow (Soviet Union) | 0–0 | (Portugal) Vitória de Setúbal |
|---|---|---|
| | Report |

Central Lenin Stadium, Moscow
Attendance: 27,000
Referee: John Gow (Wales)
4 November 1971
Second leg

| Vitória de Setúbal (Portugal) | 4–0 | (Soviet Union) Spartak Moscow |
|---|---|---|
| Machado 29'; Torres 53', 56'; João 77' | Report |

Estádio do Bonfim, Setúbal
Attendance: 40,000
Referee: Robert Wurtz (France)

Vitória de Setúbal won 4–0 on aggregate.

21 October 1971
First leg

| Juventus (Italy) | 2–0 | (Scotland) Aberdeen |
|---|---|---|
| Anastasi 5'; Murray 55' (o.g.) | Report |

Stadio Olimpico Grande Torino, Turin
Attendance: 24,352
Referee: Petar Nikolov (Bulgaria)
4 November 1971
Second leg

| Aberdeen (Scotland) | 1–1 | (Italy) Juventus |
|---|---|---|
| Harper 78' | Report | Anastasi 50' |

Pittodrie Stadium, Aberdeen
Attendance: 29,409
Referee: Theo Boosten (Netherlands)

Juventus won 3–1 on aggregate.

== Third round ==
Teams from the same nation could not be drawn against one another.

=== Summary ===
| Team 1 | Agg. | Team 2 | 1st leg | 2nd leg |
|---|---|---|---|---|
| Carl Zeiss Jena (East Germany) | 0–4 | (England) Wolverhampton Wanderers | 0–1 | 0–3 |
| UTA Arad (Romania) | 3–1 | (Portugal) Vitória de Setúbal | 3–0 | 0–1 |
| Rapid Wien (Austria) | 1–5 | (Italy) Juventus | 0–1 | 1–4 |
| Eintracht Braunschweig (West Germany) | 3–6 | (Hungary) Ferencváros | 1–1 | 2–5 |
| PSV Eindhoven (Netherlands) | 1–4 | (Belgium) Lierse | 1–0 | 0–4 |
| St Johnstone (Scotland) | 2–5 | (Socialist Federal Republic of Yugoslavia) Željezničar | 1–0 | 1–5 |
| Milan (Italy) | 3–2 | (Scotland) Dundee | 3–0 | 0–2 |
| Tottenham Hotspur (England) | 5–0 | (Romania) Rapid București | 3–0 | 2–0 |

=== Matches ===
23 November 1971
First leg

| Carl Zeiss Jena (East Germany) | 0–1 | (England) Wolverhampton Wanderers |
|---|---|---|
| | Report | Richards 12' |

Ernst-Abbe-Sportfeld, Jena
Attendance: 9,719
Referee: Erich Linemayr (Austria)
8 December 1971
Second leg

| Wolverhampton Wanderers (England) | 3–0 | (East Germany) Carl Zeiss Jena |
|---|---|---|
| Hibbitt 8'; Dougan 35', 60' | Report |

Molineux Stadium, Wolverhampton
Attendance: 24,811
Referee: Karlo Kruashvili (Soviet Union)

Wolverhampton Wanderers won 4–0 on aggregate.

24 November 1971
First leg

| UTA Arad (Romania) | 3–0 | (Portugal) Vitória de Setúbal |
|---|---|---|
| Domide 9'; Sima 16'; Kun 65' | Report |

Stadionul Francisc von Neuman, Arad
Attendance: 8,800
Referee: Antoine Queudeville (Luxembourg)
8 December 1971
Second leg

| Vitória de Setúbal (Portugal) | 1–0 | (Romania) UTA Arad |
|---|---|---|
| Marí 54' | Report |

Estádio do Bonfim, Setúbal
Attendance: 8,920
Referee: Sergio Gonella (Italy)

UTA Arad won 3–1 on aggregate.

24 November 1971
First leg

| Rapid Wien (Austria) | 0–1 | (Italy) Juventus |
|---|---|---|
| | Report | Bettega 30' |

Praterstadion, Vienna
Attendance: 212
Referee: Ferdinand Biwersi (West Germany)
8 December 1971
Second leg

| Juventus (Italy) | 4–1 | (Austria) Rapid Wien |
|---|---|---|
| Bettega 8', 46', 71'; Causio 81' (pen.) | Report | Lorenz 16' |

Stadio Olimpico Grande Torino, Turin
Attendance: 26,608
Referee: Günter Männig (East Germany)

Juventus won 5–1 on aggregate.

24 November 1971
First leg

| Eintracht Braunschweig (West Germany) | 1–1 | (Hungary) Ferencváros |
|---|---|---|
| Erler 84' | Report | Kű 8' |

Eintracht-Stadion, Braunschweig
Attendance: 10,259
Referee: Johan Einar Boström (Sweden)
8 December 1971
Second leg

| Ferencváros (Hungary) | 5–2 | (West Germany) Eintracht Braunschweig |
|---|---|---|
| Juhász 3'; Bálint 37', 51'; Branikovits 59', 80' | Report | Bründl 73'; Erler 90' |

Népstadion, Budapest
Attendance: 15,384
Referee: Pius Kamber (Switzerland)

Ferencváros won 6–3 on aggregate.

24 November 1971
First leg

| PSV Eindhoven (Netherlands) | 1–0 | (Belgium) Lierse |
|---|---|---|
| Mulders 77' | Report |

Philips Sportpark, Eindhoven
Attendance: 18,000
Referee: István Zsolt (Hungary)
8 December 1971
Second leg

| Lierse (Belgium) | 4–0 | (Netherlands) PSV Eindhoven |
|---|---|---|
| Janssens 5', 61'; Vermeyen 86'; De Nul 89' | Report |

Herman Vanderpoortenstadion, Lier
Attendance: 13,000
Referee: Norman Burtenshaw (England)

Lierse won 4–1 on aggregate.

24 November 1971
First leg

| St Johnstone (Scotland) | 1–0 | (Socialist Federal Republic of Yugoslavia) Željezničar |
|---|---|---|
| Connolly 87' | Report |

Muirton Park, Perth
Attendance: 9,061
Referee: Ad Boogaerts (Netherlands)
8 December 1971
Second leg

| Željezničar (Socialist Federal Republic of Yugoslavia) | 5–1 | (Scotland) St Johnstone |
|---|---|---|
| Janković 2'; Bukal 4', 26', 63' (pen.); Sprečo 65' | Report | Rooney 7' |

Stadion Grbavica, Sarajevo
Attendance: 7,207
Referee: Liuben Radunchev (Bulgaria)

Željezničar won 5–2 on aggregate.

24 November 1971
First leg

| Milan (Italy) | 3–0 | (Scotland) Dundee |
|---|---|---|
| Rivera 14'; Stewart 50' (o.g.); Benetti 71' | Report |

San Siro, Milan
Attendance: 14,282
Referee: Christos Michas (Greece)
8 December 1971
Second leg

| Dundee (Scotland) | 2–0 | (Italy) Milan |
|---|---|---|
| Wallace 39'; Duncan 74' | Report |

Dens Park, Dundee
Attendance: 15,569
Referee: Robert Wurtz (France)

Milan won 3–2 on aggregate.

8 December 1971
First leg

| Tottenham Hotspur (England) | 3–0 | (Romania) Rapid București |
|---|---|---|
| Peters 1'; Chivers 35', 63' | Report |

White Hart Lane, London
Attendance: 30,702
Referee: Robert Schaut (Belgium)
15 December 1971
Second leg

| Rapid București (Romania) | 0–2 | (England) Tottenham Hotspur |
|---|---|---|
| | Report | Pearce 58'; Chivers 84' |

Stadionul August 23, Bucharest
Attendance: 22,000
Referee: Aurelio Angonese (Italy)

Tottenham Hotspur won 5–0 on aggregate.

== Quarter-finals ==
=== Summary ===
| Team 1 | Agg. | Team 2 | 1st leg | 2nd leg |
|---|---|---|---|---|
| Milan (Italy) | 3–1 | (Belgium) Lierse | 2–0 | 1–1 |
| UTA Arad (Romania) | 1–3 | (England) Tottenham Hotspur | 0–2 | 1–1 |
| Juventus (Italy) | 2–3 | (England) Wolverhampton Wanderers | 1–1 | 1–2 |
| Ferencváros (Hungary) | 3–3 (5–4 p) | (Socialist Federal Republic of Yugoslavia) Željezničar | 1–2 | 2–1 (a.e.t.) |

=== Matches ===
23 February 1972
First leg

| Milan (Italy) | 2–0 | (Belgium) Lierse |
|---|---|---|
| Rivera 30' (pen.); Bigon 43' | Report |

San Siro, Milan
Attendance: 23,316
Referee: Doğan Babacan (Turkey)
7 March 1972
Second leg

| Lierse (Belgium) | 1–1 | (Italy) Milan |
|---|---|---|
| Vermeyen 86' (pen.) | Report | Villa 47' |

Herman Vanderpoortenstadion, Lier
Attendance: 18,000
Referee: José María Ortiz (Spain)

Milan won 3–1 on aggregate.

7 March 1972
First leg

| UTA Arad (Romania) | 0–2 | (England) Tottenham Hotspur |
|---|---|---|
| | Report | Morgan 12'; England 43' |

Stadionul Francisc von Neuman, Arad
Attendance: 12,253
Referee: Gerhard Schulenburg (West Germany)
21 March 1972
Second leg

| Tottenham Hotspur (England) | 1–1 | (Romania) UTA Arad |
|---|---|---|
| Gilzean 80' | Report | Domide 62' |

White Hart Lane, London
Attendance: 30,253
Referee: Joaquim Fernandes dos Campos (Portugal)

Tottenham Hotspur won 3–1 on aggregate.

7 March 1972
First leg

| Juventus (Italy) | 1–1 | (England) Wolverhampton Wanderers |
|---|---|---|
| Anastasi 37' | Report | McCalliog 65' |

Stadio Olimpico Grande Torino, Turin
Attendance: 26,202
Referee: Vital Loraux (Belgium)
22 March 1972
Second leg

| Wolverhampton Wanderers (England) | 2–1 | (Italy) Juventus |
|---|---|---|
| Hegan 40'; Dougan 52' | Report | Haller 84' |

Molineux Stadium, Wolverhampton
Attendance: 40,421
Referee: Michel Kitabdjian (France)

Wolverhampton Wanderers won 3–2 on aggregate.

9 March 1972
First leg

| Ferencváros (Hungary) | 1–2 | (Socialist Federal Republic of Yugoslavia) Željezničar |
|---|---|---|
| Albert 12' | Report | Bukal 27'; Sprečo 49' |

Népstadion, Budapest
Attendance: 32,871
Referee: John Paterson (Scotland)
22 March 1972
Second leg

| Željezničar (Socialist Federal Republic of Yugoslavia) | 1–2 (a.e.t.) | (Hungary) Ferencváros |
|---|---|---|
| Bratić 28' | Report | Kű 29'; Branikovits 65' |
Penalties
| Sprečo (penalty scored); Bratić (penalty scored); Janković (penalty missed); Hrvat (penalty scored); Bukal (penalty scored) | 4–5 | (penalty scored) Novák; (penalty scored) Páncsics; (penalty scored) Branikovits; (penalty scored) Megyesi; (penalty scored) Kű |

Stadion Grbavica, Sarajevo
Attendance: 12,298
Referee: Sergio Gonella (Italy)

3–3 on aggregate. Ferencváros won 5–4 on penalties.

== Semi-finals ==
=== Summary ===
| Team 1 | Agg. | Team 2 | 1st leg | 2nd leg |
|---|---|---|---|---|
| Ferencváros (Hungary) | 3–4 | (England) Wolverhampton Wanderers | 2–2 | 1–2 |
| Tottenham Hotspur (England) | 3–2 | (Italy) Milan | 2–1 | 1–1 |

=== Matches ===
5 April 1972
First leg

| Ferencváros (Hungary) | 2–2 | (England) Wolverhampton Wanderers |
|---|---|---|
| Szőke 30'; Albert 33' | Report | Richards 18'; Munro 80' |

Népstadion, Budapest
Attendance: 44,763
Referee: Rudolf Scheurer (Switzerland)
19 April 1972
Second leg

| Wolverhampton Wanderers (England) | 2–1 | (Hungary) Ferencváros |
|---|---|---|
| Daley 1'; Munro 45' | Report | Kű 47' |

Molineux Stadium, Wolverhampton
Attendance: 38,262
Referee: Mihas Hristos (Greece)

Wolverhampton Wanderers won 4–3 on aggregate.

5 April 1972
First leg

| Tottenham Hotspur (England) | 2–1 | (Italy) Milan |
|---|---|---|
| Perryman 33', 64' | Report | Benetti 25' |

White Hart Lane, London
Attendance: 42,064
Referee: Mariano Medina Iglesias (Spain)
19 April 1972
Second leg

| Milan (Italy) | 1–1 | (England) Tottenham Hotspur |
|---|---|---|
| Rivera 69' (pen.) | Report | Mullery 7' |

San Siro, Milan
Attendance: 69,606
Referee: Vital Loraux (Belgium)

Tottenham Hotspur won 3–2 on aggregate.

== Final ==
=== Matches ===
3 May 1972
19:30 BST
First leg

| Wolverhampton Wanderers (England) | 1–2 | (England) Tottenham Hotspur |
|---|---|---|
| McCalliog 72' | Report | Chivers 56', 87' |

Molineux Stadium, Wolverhampton
Attendance: 38,362
Referee: Tofiq Bahramov (Soviet Union)
17 May 1972
19:45 BST
Second leg

| Tottenham Hotspur (England) | 1–1 | (England) Wolverhampton Wanderers |
|---|---|---|
| Mullery 29' | Report | Wagstaffe 40' |

White Hart Lane, London
Attendance: 54,303
Referee: Laurens van Ravens (Netherlands)

Tottenham Hotspur won 3–2 on aggregate.

== See also ==
- 1971–72 European Cup
- 1971–72 European Cup Winners' Cup
