= 1970–71 European Cup Winners' Cup =

Final positions
- Champions: (England) Chelsea (1st title)
- Runners-up: (Spain) Real Madrid

Tournament statistics
- Matches played: 67
- Goals scored: 203 (3.03 per match)
- Top scorer(s): Włodzimierz Lubański (Górnik Zabrze); 8 goals

The 1970–71 season of the European Cup Winners' Cup football club tournament was won by Chelsea in a replay against Real Madrid. Defending champions Manchester City were eliminated by Chelsea in the semi-finals, only the second ever tie in the competition between two clubs from the same country. These two sides would later compete in the 2021 UEFA Champions League final, with Chelsea winning 1-0. The final was played in Karaiskakis Stadium in Piraeus, Greece.

== Teams ==
(Albania) Partizani (CW)	(Austria) Wacker Innsbruck (CW)	(Belgium) Club Brugge (CW)	(Bulgaria) CSKA September Flag (CR)
(Cyprus) Pezoporikos Larnaca (CW)	(Czechoslovakia) TJ Gottwaldov (CW)	(Denmark) AaB (CW)	(England) Chelsea (CW)
(England) Manchester City (10th)^{TH}	(Finland) Haka (CW)	(France) Nantes (CR)	(East Germany) Vorwärts Berlin (CW)
(West Germany) Kickers Offenbach (CW)	(Greece) Aris (CW)	(Hungary) Budapest Honvéd (CR)	(Iceland) ÍB Akureyri (CW)
(Republic of Ireland) Bohemian (CW)	(Italy) Bologna (CW)	Union Luxembourg (CW)	(Malta) Hibernians (CW)
(Netherlands) PSV Eindhoven (CR)	(Northern Ireland) Linfield (CW)	(Norway) Strømsgodset (CW)	(Poland) Górnik Zabrze (CW)
(Portugal) Benfica (CW)	(Romania) Steaua București (CW)	(Scotland) Aberdeen (CW)	(Spain) Real Madrid (CW)
(Sweden) Åtvidabergs FF (CW)	(Switzerland) Zürich (CW)	(Turkey) Göztepe (CW)	(Soviet Union) Karpaty Lviv (CW)
(Wales) Cardiff City (CW)	(Socialist Federal Republic of Yugoslavia) Olimpija Ljubljana (CR)		

== Bracket ==
First round
(West Germany) Kickers Offenbach	2	0	2
(Belgium) Club Brugge	1	2	3
(Switzerland) Zürich	7	7	14
(Iceland) ÍB Akureyri	1	0	1
(Bulgaria) CSKA September Flag	9	2	11
(Finland) Haka	0	1	1
(Greece) Aris	1	1	2
(England) Chelsea	1	5	6
(Turkey) Göztepe	5	0	5
Union Luxembourg	0	1	1
(Denmark) AaB	0	1	1
(Poland) Górnik Zabrze	1	8	9
(Scotland) Aberdeen	3	1	4(4)
(Hungary) Budapest Honvéd	1	3	4(5)
(England) Manchester City	1	1	2
(Northern Ireland) Linfield	0	2	2
(Czechoslovakia) TJ Gottwaldov	2	0	2
(Netherlands) PSV Eindhoven	1	1	2
(Soviet Union) Karpaty Lviv	0	3	3
(Romania) Steaua București	1	3	4
(Socialist Federal Republic of Yugoslavia) Olimpija Ljubljana	1	1	2
(Portugal) Benfica	1	8	9
(East Germany) Vorwärts Berlin	0	1	1
(Italy) Bologna	0	1	1
(Wales) Cardiff City	8	0	8
(Cyprus) Pezoporikos Larnaca	0	0	0
(Norway) Strømsgodset	0	3	3
(France) Nantes	5	2	7
(Malta) Hibernians	0	0	0
(Spain) Real Madrid	0	5	5
(Austria) Wacker Innsbruck	3	2	5
(Albania) Partizani	2	1	3

Second round
(Belgium) Club Brugge	2	2	4
(Switzerland) Zürich	0	3	3
(Bulgaria) CSKA September Flag	0	0	0
(England) Chelsea	1	1	2
(Turkey) Göztepe	0	0	0
(Poland) Górnik Zabrze	1	3	4
(Hungary) Budapest Honvéd	0	0	0
(England) Manchester City	1	2	3
(Netherlands) PSV Eindhoven	4	3	7
(Romania) Steaua București	0	0	0
(Portugal) Benfica	2	0	2(3)
(East Germany) Vorwärts Berlin	0	2	2(5)
(Wales) Cardiff City	5	2	7
(France) Nantes	1	1	2
(Spain) Real Madrid	0	2	2
(Austria) Wacker Innsbruck	1	0	1

Quarter-finals
(Belgium) Club Brugge	2	0	2
(England) Chelsea	0	4	4
(Poland) Górnik Zabrze	2	0	2/1
(England) Manchester City	0	2	2/3
(Netherlands) PSV Eindhoven	2	0	2
(East Germany) Vorwärts Berlin	0	1	1
(Wales) Cardiff City	1	0	1
(Spain) Real Madrid	0	2	2

Semi-finals
(England) Chelsea	1	1	2
(England) Manchester City	0	0	0
(Netherlands) PSV Eindhoven	0	1	1
(Spain) Real Madrid	0	2	2

Final
(England) Chelsea	2
(Spain) Real Madrid	1

== Preliminary round ==
Team 1	Agg.	Team 2	1st leg	2nd leg
Åtvidabergs FF (Sweden)	1–3	(Albania) Partizani	1–1	0–2
Bohemian (Republic of Ireland)	3–4	(Czechoslovakia) TJ Gottwaldov	1–2	2–2

=== First leg ===
23 August 1970

Åtvidabergs FF (Sweden)	1–1	(Albania) Partizani
Franzén 61'		Johansson 2' (o.g.)

Kopparvallen, Åtvidaberg
Referee: Robert Schaut (Belgium)

26 August 1970

Bohemian (Republic of Ireland)	1–2	(Czechoslovakia) TJ Gottwaldov
Swan 22'		Urban 67'; Nehoda 84'

Dalymount Park, Dublin
Referee: Frede Hansen (Denmark)

=== Second leg ===
2 September 1970

Partizani (Albania)	2–0	(Sweden) Åtvidabergs FF
Pano 14'; Rragami 35'

Qemal Stafa Stadium, Tirana
Referee: Doğan Babacan (Turkey)

Partizani won 5–1 on aggregate.

2 September 1970

TJ Gottwaldov (Czechoslovakia)	2–2	(Republic of Ireland) Bohemian
Hojsík 5'; Jenčík 25'		O'Connell 39'; Dunne 64'

Letná Stadion, Zlín
Referee: Gilbert Droz (Switzerland)

TJ Gottwaldov won 6–5 on aggregate.

== First round ==
Team 1	Agg.	Team 2	1st leg	2nd leg
Kickers Offenbach (West Germany)	2–3	(Belgium) Club Brugge	2–1	0–2
Zürich (Switzerland)	14–1	(Iceland) ÍB Akureyri	7–1	7–0
CSKA September Flag (Bulgaria)	11–1	(Finland) Haka	9–0	2–1
Aris (Greece)	2–6	(England) Chelsea	1–1	1–5
Aberdeen (Scotland)	4–4 (4-5p)	(Hungary) Budapest Honvéd	3–1	1–3 (a.e.t.)
Manchester City (England)	2–2 (a)	(Northern Ireland) Linfield	1–0	1–2
Göztepe (Turkey)	5–1	Union Luxembourg	5–0	0–1
AaB (Denmark)	1–9	(Poland) Górnik Zabrze	0–1	1–8
TJ Gottwaldov (Czechoslovakia)	2–2 (a)	(Netherlands) PSV Eindhoven	2–1	0–1
Karpaty Lviv (Soviet Union)	3–4	(Romania) Steaua București	0–1	3–3
Olimpija Ljubljana (Socialist Federal Republic of Yugoslavia)	2–9	(Portugal) Benfica	1–1	1–8
Vorwärts Berlin (East Germany)	1–1 (a)	(Italy) Bologna	0–0	1–1
Cardiff City (Wales)	8–0	(Cyprus) Pezoporikos Larnaca	8–0	0–0
Strømsgodset (Norway)	3–7	(France) Nantes	0–5	3–2
Hibernians (Malta)	0–5	(Spain) Real Madrid	0–0	0–5
Wacker Innsbruck (Austria)	5–3	(Albania) Partizani	3–2	2–1

=== First leg ===
16 September 1970

Kickers Offenbach (West Germany)	2–1	(Belgium) Club Brugge
Kremers 48' (pen.), 67'		Lambert 33'

Bieberer Berg, Offenbach
Referee: Bertil Lööw (Sweden)

16 September 1970

Zürich (Switzerland)	7–1	(Iceland) ÍB Akureyri
Stierli 1'; Martinelli 34'; Volkert 44', 49', 62'; Künzli 51', 69'	FCZ summary	71' Árnason

Letzigrund, Zürich
Attendance: 5,700
Referee: Alexandru Pîrvu (Romania)

16 September 1970

CSKA September Flag (Bulgaria)	9–0	(Finland) Haka
Yakimov 7', 30', 64'; Nikodimov 15' (pen.), 37'; Asikainen 43' (o.g.); Zhekov 61', 81'; Marashliev 77'

Bulgarian Army Stadium, Sofia
Referee: Nejat Şener (Turkey)

16 September 1970

Aris (Greece)	1–1	(England) Chelsea
Alexiadis		Hutchinson

Kaftanzoglio Stadium, Thessaloniki
Attendance: 50000
Referee: Gyula Emsberger (Hungary)

16 September 1970

Aberdeen (Scotland)	3–1	(Hungary) Budapest Honvéd
Graham 12'; Harper 32'; Murray 83'		Pusztai 7'

Pittodrie Stadium, Aberdeen
Referee: Anton Bucheli (Switzerland)

16 September 1970

Manchester City (England)	1–0	(Northern Ireland) Linfield
Bell 83'

Maine Road, Manchester
Referee: Guðmundur Haraldsson (Iceland)

16 September 1970

Göztepe (Turkey)	5–0	Union Luxembourg
Öznur 18', 26', 57' Güzelırmak 21' Nielsen 90'	Report

Alsancak Mustafa Denizli Stadium, İzmir
Attendance: 13,691
Referee: Ramiz Pregja (Albania)

16 September 1970

AaB (Denmark)	0–1	(Poland) Górnik Zabrze
		Lubański 28'

Aalborg Stadium, Aalborg
Referee: William Mullan (Scotland)

16 September 1970

TJ Gottwaldov (Czechoslovakia)	2–1	(Netherlands) PSV Eindhoven
Urban 2'; Nehoda 53'		Devrindt 88'

Letná Stadion, Zlín
Referee: Erich Linemayr (Austria)

16 September 1970
19:00

Karpaty Lviv (Soviet Union)	0–1	(Romania) Steaua București
	Report	Tătaru 88'

Druzhba Stadium, Lviv
Attendance: 48,000
Referee: István Zsolt (Hungary)

16 September 1970

Olimpija Ljubljana (Socialist Federal Republic of Yugoslavia)	1–1	(Portugal) Benfica
Pejović 53'		Eusébio 30'

Bežigrad Stadium, Ljubljana
Attendance: 11,951
Referee: Paul Bonett (Malta)

16 September 1970

Vorwärts Berlin (East Germany)	0–0	(Italy) Bologna

Friedrich-Ludwig-Jahn-Sportpark, Berlin
Referee: Ad Boogaerts (Netherlands)

16 September 1970

Cardiff City (Wales)	8–0	(Cyprus) Pezoporikos Larnaca
Sutton 18'; Gibson 33'; King 36'; Woodruff 40'; Clark 44', 60'; Toshack 54', 82'

Ninian Park, Cardiff
Attendance: 12,984
Referee: Jacques Colling (Luxembourg)

16 September 1970

Strømsgodset (Norway)	0–5	(France) Nantes
		Gondet 30'; Levavasseur 42', 64'; Arribas 62'; Michel 90'

Marienlyst Stadion, Drammen
Referee: Curt Liedberg (Sweden)

16 September 1970

Hibernians (Malta)	0–0	(Spain) Real Madrid

Empire Stadium, Gżira
Referee: Leo Callaghan (Wales)

16 September 1970

Wacker Innsbruck (Austria)	3–2	(Albania) Partizani
Ettmayer 40' (pen.); Obert 52'; Franceškin 83'		Pano 22'; Janku 23'

Tivoli, Innsbruck
Referee: Milivoje Gugulović (Yugoslavia)

=== Second leg ===
30 September 1970

Club Brugge (Belgium)	2–0	(West Germany) Kickers Offenbach
Marmenout 30'; Hinderyckx 90'

Klokke Stadion, Bruges
Referee: Fernando Santos Leite (Portugal)

Club Brugge won 3–2 on aggregate.

22 September 1970

ÍB Akureyri (Iceland)	0–7	(Switzerland) Zürich
	FCZ summary	6', 13', 19' Künzli; 17', 55' Volkert; 83' Heer; 87' Grünig

Espenmoos, St. Gallen
Attendance: 2,000
Referee: Cornel Niţescu (Romania)

Zürich won 14–1 on aggregate

30 September 1970

Haka (Finland)	1–2	(Bulgaria) CSKA September Flag
Malm 88'		Yakimov 50', 56'

Tehtaan kenttä, Valkeakoski
Referee: Erwin Vetter (East Germany)

CSKA September Flag won 11–1 on aggregate.

30 September 1970

Chelsea (England)	5–1	(Greece) Aris
Hollins 7', 27'; Hutchinson 20', 56'; Hinton 52'		Alexiadis 85'

Stamford Bridge, London
Attendance: 40,425
Referee: Martti Hirviniemi (Finland)

Chelsea won 6–2 on aggregate.

30 September 1970

Budapest Honvéd (Hungary)	3–1 (a.e.t.)	(Scotland) Aberdeen
Kocsis 19', 69'; Kozma 58'		Murray 78'
Penalties
Tichy (penalty scored); Kocsis (penalty scored); Marosi (penalty scored); Vági (penalty scored); Bicskei (penalty scored)	5–4	(penalty scored) Murray; (penalty scored) Harper; (penalty missed) Forrest; (penalty scored) Hermiston; (penalty scored) Willoughby

Bozsik József Stadion, Budapest
Referee: Concetto Lo Bello (Italy)

4–4 on aggregate. Budapest Honvéd won 5–4 on penalties.

30 September 1970

Linfield (Northern Ireland)	2–1	(England) Manchester City
Millen 4', 56'		Lee 6'

Windsor Park, Belfast
Referee: William Gow (Wales)

2–2 on aggregate; Manchester City won on away goals.

23 September 1970

Union Luxembourg	1–0	(Turkey) Göztepe
Braun 15'	Report

Stade Josy Barthel, Luxembourg City
Attendance: 1,842
Referee: Hiqmet Kuka (Albania)

Göztepe won 5–1 on aggregate

30 September 1970

Górnik Zabrze (Poland)	8–1	(Denmark) AaB
Szaryński 1'; Olek 8', 84'; Wilim 15', 58'; Lubański 46', 74' (pen.); Szołtysik 51'	Report	Andersen 27'

Ernest Pohl Stadium, Zabrze
Referee: Tofiq Bahramov (Soviet Union)

Górnik Zabrze won 9–1 on aggregate.

30 September 1970

PSV Eindhoven (Netherlands)	1–0	(Czechoslovakia) TJ Gottwaldov
Veenstra 46'

Philips Stadion, Eindhoven
Referee: Kåre Sirevaag (Norway)

1–1 on aggregate; PSV Eindhoven won on away goals.

30 September 1970
13:30

Steaua București (Romania)	3–3	(Soviet Union) Karpaty Lviv
Dumitriu 19'; Tătaru 28' (pen.); Ștefănescu 70'	Report	Kulchytskyi 16'; Habowda 25'; Hreshchak 90'

Stadionul Republicii, Bucharest
Attendance: 25,000
Referee: Günter Männig (East Germany)

Steaua București won 4–3 on aggregate.

30 September 1970

(Portugal) Benfica	8–1	Olimpija Ljubljana (Socialist Federal Republic of Yugoslavia)
Eusébio 26', 30', 32', 71', 83'; Zeca 47'; Artur Jorge 67'; Jaime Graça 84'		Ameršek 51'

Estádio da Luz, Lisbon
Attendance: 38,760
Referee: Antoine Queudeville (Luxembourg)

Benfica won 9–2 on aggregate.

30 September 1970

Bologna (Italy)	1–1 (a.e.t.)	(East Germany) Vorwärts Berlin
Savoldi 106'		Begerad 112'

Stadio Comunale, Bologna
Referee: Robert Héliès (France)

1–1 on aggregate; Vorwärts Berlin won on away goals.

30 September 1970

Pezoporikos Larnaca (Cyprus)	0–0	(Wales) Cardiff City

GSZ Stadium, Larnaca
Attendance: 2,100
Referee: Petar Nikolov (Bulgaria)

Cardiff City won 8-0 on aggregate.

30 September 1970

Nantes (France)	2–3	(Norway) Strømsgodset
Levavasseur 70'; Blanchet 85'		I. Pettersen 50'; S. Pettersen 53', 55'

Stade Marcel-Saupin, Nantes
Referee: Mariano Medina Iglesias (Spain)

Nantes won 7-3 on aggregate.

30 September 1970

Real Madrid (Spain)	5–0	(Malta) Hibernians
Pirri 1'; Planelles 8', 54', 82'; Marañón 51'

Santiago Bernabéu, Madrid
Referee: Joaquim Fernandes dos Campos (Portugal)

Real Madrid won 5-0 on aggregate.

30 September 1970

Partizani (Albania)	1–2	(Austria) Wacker Innsbruck
Rragami 24'		Grausam 38', 67'

Qemal Stafa Stadium, Tirana
Referee: Rudolf Scheurer (Switzerland)

Wacker Innsbruck won 5-3 on aggregate.

== Second round ==
Team 1	Agg.	Team 2	1st leg	2nd leg
Club Brugge (Belgium)	4–3	(Switzerland) Zürich	2–0	2–3
CSKA September Flag (Bulgaria)	0–2	(England) Chelsea	0–1	0–1
Budapest Honvéd (Hungary)	0–3	(England) Manchester City	0–1	0–2
Göztepe (Turkey)	0–4	(Poland) Górnik Zabrze	0–1	0–3
PSV Eindhoven (Netherlands)	7–0	(Romania) Steaua București	4–0	3–0
Benfica (Portugal)	2–2 (3-5p)	(East Germany) Vorwärts Berlin	2–0	0–2
Cardiff City (Wales)	7–2	(France) Nantes	5–1	2–1
Real Madrid (Spain)	2–1	(Austria) Wacker Innsbruck	0–1	2–0

=== First leg ===
21 October 1970

Club Brugge (Belgium)	2–0	(Switzerland) Zürich
Rensenbrink 18'; Carteus 38'	FCZ summary

Klokke Stadion, Bruges
Attendance: 16,000
Referee: Brunon Piotrowicz (Poland)

21 October 1970

CSKA September Flag (Bulgaria)	0–1	(England) Chelsea
		Baldwin 43'

Vasil Levski National Stadium, Sofia
Attendance: 45,000
Referee: Rudolf Scheurer (Switzerland)

21 October 1970

Budapest Honvéd (Hungary)	0–1	(England) Manchester City
		Lee 65'

Bozsik József Stadion, Budapest
Referee: Mariano Medina Iglesias (Spain)

21 October 1970

Göztepe (Turkey)	0–1	(Poland) Górnik Zabrze
		Lubański 28'

Alsancak Mustafa Denizli Stadium, İzmir
Referee: Robert Schaut (Belgium)

21 October 1970

PSV Eindhoven (Netherlands)	4–0	(Romania) Steaua București
Veenstra 32' Devrindt 67', 87' Mulders 68'	Report

Philips Stadion, Eindhoven
Attendance: 24,500
Referee: Gerhard Schulenburg (West Germany)

21 October 1970

(Portugal) Benfica	2–0	(East Germany) Vorwärts Berlin (East Germany)
Eusébio 3'; Diamantino Costa 66'

Estádio da Luz, Lisbon
Attendance: 29,796
Referee: Josip Horvath (Yugoslavia)

21 October 1970

(Wales) Cardiff City	5–1	Nantes (France)
Toshack 8', 37'; Gibson 9'; King 76'; Phillips 82'		Gondet 2'

Ninian Park, Cardiff
Referee: Wolfgang Riedel (East Germany)

21 October 1970

(Spain) Real Madrid	0–1	Wacker Innsbruck (Austria)
		Grausam 1'

Santiago Bernabéu, Madrid
Referee: Laurens van Ravens (Netherlands)

=== Second leg ===
4 November 1970

Zürich (Switzerland)	3–2	(Belgium) Club Brugge
Axelsson 21' (o.g.); Martinelli (yellow card) 23'; Grünig 55'; Künzli 83'	FCZ summary	4' Carteus; (yellow card) 23' Moelaert; (yellow card) 60' Houwaart; 74' Rensenbrink

Letzigrund, Zürich
Attendance: 11,500
Referee: Ertugrul Dilek (Turkey)

Club Brugge won 4–3 on aggregate

4 November 1970

Chelsea (England)	1–0	(Bulgaria) CSKA September Flag
Webb 41'

Stamford Bridge, London
Attendance: 41,613
Referee: Paul Schiller (Austria)

Chelsea won 2–0 on aggregate.

4 November 1970

Manchester City (England)	2–0	(Hungary) Budapest Honvéd
Bell 10' Lee 67'

Maine Road, Manchester
Referee: Mariano Medina Iglesias (Spain)

Manchester City won 3–0 on aggregate.

4 November 1970

Górnik Zabrze (Poland)	3–0	(Turkey) Göztepe
Lubański 28', 33' Banaś 30'

Ernest Pohl Stadium, Zabrze
Referee: Michel Kitabdjian (France)

Górnik Zabrze won 4–0 on aggregate.

4 November 1970

Steaua București (Romania)	0–3	(Netherlands) PSV Eindhoven
	Report	Veenstra 45', 53' Van der Kuijlen 79'

Stadionul 23 August, Bucharest
Attendance: 50,000
Referee: Jim Finney (England)

PSV Eindhoven won 7–0 on aggregate.

4 November 1970

Vorwärts Berlin (East Germany)	2–0 (a.e.t.)	(Portugal) Benfica
Wruck 25'; Fräßdorf 67'
Penalties
Dietzsch (penalty scored); Körner (penalty scored); Nöldner (penalty scored); Fräßdorf (penalty scored); Strübing (penalty scored)	5–3	(penalty scored) Artur Jorge; (penalty missed) Vítor Martins; (penalty scored) Toni; (penalty scored) Raul Águas

Friedrich-Ludwig-Jahn-Sportpark, Berlin
Attendance: 10,533
Referee: John Adair (Northern Ireland)

2–2 on aggregate. Vorwärts Berlin won 5–3 on penalties.

4 November 1970

Nantes (France)	1–2	(Wales) Cardiff City
Blanchet 85'		Toshack 13'; Clark 76'

Stade Marcel-Saupin, Nantes
Referee: Timoleon Latsios (Greece)

Cardiff City won 7–2 on aggregate.

4 November 1970

Wacker Innsbruck (Austria)	0–2	(Spain) Real Madrid
		Grande 76'; Bueno 83'

Tivoli, Innsbruck
Referee: István Zsolt (Hungary)

Real Madrid won 2–1 on aggregate.

== Quarter-finals ==
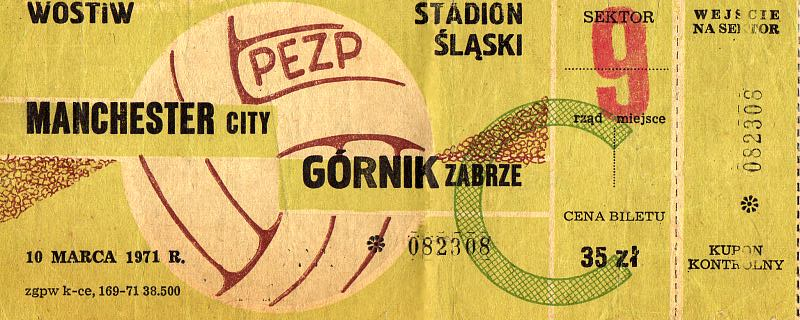
Ticket to match Manchester City–Górnik Zabrze in Chorzów

Team 1	Agg.	Team 2	1st leg	2nd leg	Play-off
Club Brugge (Belgium)	2–4	(England) Chelsea	2–0	0–4 a.e.t.	
Górnik Zabrze (Poland)	2–2	(England) Manchester City	2–0	0–2	1–3
PSV Eindhoven (Netherlands)	2–1	(East Germany) Vorwärts Berlin	2–0	0–1	
Cardiff City (Wales)	1–2	(Spain) Real Madrid	1–0	0–2	

=== First leg ===
10 March 1971

Club Brugge (Belgium)	2–0	(England) Chelsea
Lambert 4'; Marmenout 40'

Klokke Stadion, Bruges
Referee: Gocho Rusev (Bulgaria)

10 March 1971

Górnik Zabrze (Poland)	2–0	(England) Manchester City
Lubański 34'; Wilczek 40'

Silesian Stadium, Chorzów
Referee: Léonidas Vamvakopoulos (Greece)

10 March 1971

PSV Eindhoven (Netherlands)	2–0	(East Germany) Vorwärts Berlin
Devrindt 47' van den Dungen 80'

Philips Stadion, Eindhoven
Referee: Gyula Emsberger (Hungary)

10 March 1971

Cardiff City (Wales)	1–0	(Spain) Real Madrid
Clark 20'

Ninian Park, Cardiff
Referee: Vital Loraux (Belgium)

=== Second leg ===
24 March 1971

Chelsea (England)	4–0 (a.e.t.)	(Belgium) Club Brugge
Houseman 20'; Osgood 82', 114'; Baldwin 117'

Stamford Bridge, London
Referee: Petar Kostovski (Yugoslavia)

Chelsea won 4–2 on aggregate.

24 March 1971

Manchester City (England)	2–0 (a.e.t.)	(Poland) Górnik Zabrze
Mellor 40'; Doyle 66'

Maine Road, Manchester
Referee: Anton Bucheli (Switzerland)

2–2 on aggregate.

24 March 1971

Vorwärts Berlin (East Germany)	1–0	(Netherlands) PSV Eindhoven
Fräßdorf 17'

Friedrich-Ludwig-Jahn-Sportpark, East Berlin
Referee: Gaspar Pintado Viu (Spain)

Real Madrid won 2–1 on aggregate.

24 March 1971

Real Madrid (Spain)	2–0	(Wales) Cardiff City
Velázquez 50'; Fleitas 51'

Santiago Bernabéu, Madrid
Referee: Karol Šárka (Czechoslovakia)

Real Madrid won 2–1 on aggregate.

=== Play-off ===
31 March 1971

Manchester City (England)	3–1	(Poland) Górnik Zabrze
Young 20'; Booth 38'; Lee 65'		Lubański 57'

Idrætsparken, Copenhagen
Referee: Gunnar Michaelsen (Denmark)

Manchester City won play-off 3–1.

== Semi-finals ==
Team 1	Agg.	Team 2	1st leg	2nd leg
Chelsea (England)	2–0	(England) Manchester City	1–0	1–0
PSV Eindhoven (Netherlands)	1–2	(Spain) Real Madrid	0–0	1–2

=== First leg ===
14 April 1971

Chelsea (England)	1–0	(England) Manchester City
Smethurst 46'	Report Report 2

Stamford Bridge, London
Referee: Pavel Kazakov (Soviet Union)

14 April 1971
19:15

PSV Eindhoven (Netherlands)	0–0	(Spain) Real Madrid
	Report Report 2

Philips Stadion, Eindhoven
Attendance: 24,000
Referee: William O'Neill (Republic of Ireland)

=== Second leg ===
28 April 1971

Manchester City (England)	0–1	(England) Chelsea
	Report Report 2	Healey 43' (o.g.)

Maine Road, Manchester
Referee: István Zsolt (Hungary)

Chelsea won 2–0 on aggregate.

28 April 1971
21:00

Real Madrid (Spain)	2–1	(Netherlands) PSV Eindhoven
Zoco 36'; Pirri 82'	Report Report 2	Van den Dungen 58'

Santiago Bernabéu, Madrid
Attendance: 60,000
Referee: Michel Kitabdjian (France)

Real Madrid won 2–1 on aggregate.

== Final ==
19 May 1971
20:30

Chelsea (England)	1–1	(Spain) Real Madrid
Osgood 56'	Report; Report 2	Zoco 90'

Karaiskakis Stadium, Piraeus
Attendance: 42,000
Referee: Rudolf Scheurer (Switzerland)

=== Replay ===
21 May 1971
20:30

Chelsea (England)	2–1	(Spain) Real Madrid
Dempsey 33'; Osgood 39'	Report; Report 2	Fleitas 75'

Karaiskakis Stadium, Piraeus
Attendance: 19,917
Referee: Rudolf Scheurer (Switzerland)

== Top scorers ==
The top scorers from the 1970–71 European Cup Winners' Cup are as follows:

Rank	Name	Team	Goals
1	(Poland) Włodzimierz Lubański	(Poland) Górnik Zabrze	8
2	(Portugal) Eusébio	(Portugal) Benfica	7
3	(Switzerland) Fritz Künzli	(Switzerland) Zürich	6
4	(Wales) John Toshack	(Wales) Cardiff City	5
4	(West Germany) Georg Volkert	(Switzerland) Zürich	5
4	(Bulgaria) Dimitar Yakimov	(Bulgaria) CSKA September Flag	5
7	(England) Brian Clark	(Wales) Cardiff City	4
7	(Belgium) Johan Devrindt	(Netherlands) PSV Eindhoven	4
7	(England) Francis Lee	(England) Manchester City	4
7	(England) Peter Osgood	(England) Chelsea	4
7	(Netherlands) Wietse Veenstra	(Netherlands) PSV Eindhoven	4

== See also ==
- 1970–71 European Cup
- 1970–71 Inter-Cities Fairs Cup
