= Nîmes Olympique in European football =

French club in European football

- Club: Nîmes Olympique
- First entry: 1971–72 UEFA Cup
- Latest entry: 1996–97 UEFA Cup Winners' Cup

This article lists results for French association football team Nîmes Olympique in European competition.

== Participations ==
As of 4 December 2012, Nîmes have competed in:

- 1 participation in the UEFA Cup Winners' Cup
- 2 participations in the UEFA Cup / UEFA Europa League

=== Record by competition ===
As of 4 December 2012

Competition	Played	Won	Drawn	Lost	Goals for	Goals against
UEFA Cup Winners' Cup	4	3	0	1	7	5
UEFA Europa League	4	1	0	3	4	6
Total	8	4	0	4	11	11

== Matches in Europe ==
Season	Competition	Round	Country	Club	Score
1971–72	UEFA Cup	First round	POR	Vitória de Setúbal	0–1 (A), 2–1 (H)
1972–73	UEFA Cup	First round	SUI	Grasshopper	1–2 (H), 1–2 (A)
1996–97	Cup Winners' Cup	First round	HUN	Budapest Honvéd	3–1 (H), 2–1 (A)
1996–97	Cup Winners' Cup	Second round	SWE	AIK	1–3 (H), 1–0 (A)
