= 1970–71 DDR-Oberliga =

DDR-Oberliga
- Season: 1970–71
- Champions: Dynamo Dresden
- Relegated: FC Rot-Weiss Erfurt; BSG Chemie Leipzig
- European Cup: Dynamo Dresden
- European Cup Winners' Cup: BFC Dynamo
- UEFA Cup: Hallescher FC Chemie; FC Carl Zeiss Jena
- Matches: 182
- Goals: 508 (2.79 per match)
- Top goalscorer: Hans-Jürgen Kreische (17)
- Total attendance: 2,140,500
- Average attendance: 11,761

The 1970–71 DDR-Oberliga was the 22nd season of the DDR-Oberliga, the first tier of league football in East Germany.

The league was contested by fourteen teams. Dynamo Dresden won the championship, the club's second of eight East German championships, having previously won the 1952–53 edition.

Hans-Jürgen Kreische of Dynamo Dresden was the league's top scorer with 17 goals, the first of a record four top scorer finishes for Kreische, while Peter Ducke of FC Carl Zeiss Jena won the seasons East German Footballer of the year award.

On the strength of the 1970–71 title Dresden qualified for the 1971–72 European Cup where the club was knocked out by Ajax in the first round. Ninth-placed club BFC Dynamo qualified for the 1971–72 European Cup Winners' Cup as the seasons FDGB-Pokal runners-up, Dresden having won the double, and was knocked out by Dynamo Moscow in the semi-finals. Second-placed FC Carl Zeiss Jena qualified for the 1971–72 UEFA Cup where it was knocked out in the third round by Wolverhampton Wanderers while third-placed Hallescher FC Chemie withdrew after losing a player in the Hotel 't Silveren Seepaerd fire before the second leg of their first round tie with PSV Eindhoven.

At the end of the season National People's Army club FC Vorwärts Berlin, based in East Berlin, was moved to Frankfurt/Oder to become FC Vorwärts Frankfurt/Oder for political reasons. Vorwärts had been quite a popular club with East Berlin football supporters but was seen as an obstacle to the ambitions of BFC Dynamo, which was supported by the Ministry for State Security and its head Erich Mielke. The relocation was allegedly driven by Erich Mielke, who wanted to create better sporting conditions for BFC Dynamo in East Berlin, and his fellow Politburo member and SED First Secretary in Bezirk Frankfurt Erich Mückenberger, who anticipated a boost for the Frankfurt/Oder region.

== Table ==
The 1970–71 season saw two newly promoted clubs 1. FC Union Berlin and 1. FC Lokomotive Leipzig.

Pos	Team	Pld	W	D	L	GF	GA	GD	Pts	Qualification or relegation
1	SG Dynamo Dresden (C)	26	18	3	5	56	29	+27	39	Qualification to European Cup first round
2	FC Carl Zeiss Jena	26	14	5	7	58	29	+29	33	Qualification to UEFA Cup first round
3	Hallescher FC Chemie	26	10	10	6	35	29	+6	30	Qualification to UEFA Cup first round
4	1. FC Magdeburg	26	10	7	9	37	38	−1	27	
5	1. FC Union Berlin	26	8	11	7	27	33	−6	27	
6	BSG Sachsenring Zwickau	26	11	4	11	40	42	−2	26	
7	FC Vorwärts Berlin	26	10	6	10	38	44	−6	26	
8	F.C. Hansa Rostock	26	10	5	11	31	25	+6	25	
9	BFC Dynamo	26	10	5	11	31	29	+2	25	Qualification to Cup Winners' Cup first round
10	1. FC Lokomotive Leipzig	26	9	6	11	42	46	−4	24	
11	BSG Wismut Aue	26	8	5	13	30	36	−6	21	
12	Stahl Riesa	26	6	9	11	28	41	−13	21	
13	FC Rot-Weiss Erfurt (R)	26	6	9	11	28	44	−16	21	Relegation to DDR-Liga
14	BSG Chemie Leipzig (R)	26	5	9	12	27	43	−16	19	Relegation to DDR-Liga

(C) Champions; (R) Relegated

== Results ==
Home \ Away	BFC	CZJ	CHM	DRE	HFC	HRO	LOK	MAG	RWE	SZW	STR	UNI	VBE	AUE
BFC Dynamo		2–1	1–1	0–1	1–0	0–2	4–2	2–1	3–1	0–0	5–0	1–1	1–0	3–0
Carl Zeiss Jena	5–1		5–1	3–1	0–0	2–1	1–0	3–1	4–1	7–3	4–1	4–0	4–0	2–0
Chemie Leipzig	1–2	0–1		2–4	1–1	0–0	1–1	1–1	2–0	2–0	1–3	0–0	2–3	1–0
Dynamo Dresden	2–1	3–0	3–1		2–0	3–1	3–1	3–2	3–0	4–2	0–0	2–0	4–1	5–0
Hallescher FC Chemie	2–1	2–2	1–1	2–2		1–1	4–2	2–1	6–1	1–0	2–0	3–1	1–0	1–0
Hansa Rostock	1–0	1–0	3–1	3–2	2–0		1–1	3–0	0–0	3–2	3–0	0–1	4–1	0–1
Lokomotive Leipzig	1–0	3–2	3–0	0–1	3–0	2–1		0–0	2–1	2–3	2–0	1–1	2–0	1–1
1. FC Magdeburg	0–0	1–0	2–1	2–1	3–1	2–1	3–2		1–2	0–1	2–2	2–3	1–0	2–1
Rot-Weiß Erfurt	1–0	1–1	1–1	1–2	0–0	2–0	2–2	0–0		3–2	3–0	2–0	0–0	0–0
Sachsenring Zwickau	1–0	1–0	1–0	1–2	2–0	1–0	2–1	2–3	5–4		2–1	1–1	4–0	0–0
Stahl Riesa	2–0	0–3	3–4	0–0	0–0	1–0	5–1	2–2	1–1	2–2		0–0	1–1	1–0
Union Berlin	0–1	0–0	0–0	2–1	1–1	0–0	2–1	1–3	4–1	2–1	1–0		1–1	3–2
Vorwärts Berlin	1–0	4–4	0–1	4–1	2–2	1–0	5–1	3–1	1–0	3–1	2–1	2–2		2–1
Wismut Aue	2–2	1–0	4–1	0–1	0–2	1–0	3–5	1–1	4–0	1–0	0–2	3–0	4–1	

Legend: Blue = home team win; Yellow = draw; Red = away team win.
