= John McAlle =

English footballer

Personal information
- Date of birth: 31 January 1950 (age 76)
- Place of birth: Liverpool, England
- Position: Centre back

Youth career
- Huyton Schoolboys
- Lancashire Schoolboys
- 1965–1967: Wolverhampton Wanderers

Senior career*
Years	Team	Apps	(Gls)
1967–1981	Wolverhampton Wanderers	407	(0)
1981–1982	Sheffield United	18	(0)
1982–1984	Derby County	58	(1)
Total		483	(1)
- * Club domestic league appearances and goals

John McAlle (born 31 January 1950) is a former professional footballer who spent the majority of his career at Wolverhampton Wanderers, where he played over 500 games.

== Career ==
McAlle joined Wolves as an apprentice in July 1965, turning professional in February 1967. After a period playing in the reserve league, he made his first team debut on 29 April 1968, in a 1–0 defeat at Chelsea. He only appeared sporadically (mostly as a substitute) in the following years, but became a first-team regular in the 1970–71 season.

Known to his teammates as Scouse, McAlle was the club's first-choice centre-back throughout most of the 1970s. During this period he played in the 1972 UEFA Cup final and won the League Cup in 1974. He was also part of the side that won the Second Division championship in 1976–77, to immediately return Wolves to the top flight.

His position at Molineux was weakened by the arrival of Emlyn Hughes in 1979, after which he was largely used as a substitute. His career took a further downturn when he broke his leg coming on as a sub playing against Watford in February 1980, which kept him out for 11 months. He returned for the second half of the 1980–81 season and managed to retain his place in the starting line-up.

The defender's long association with Wolves finally ended in August 1981, when he joined Sheffield United for £10,000 after he was not offered a contract extension. In total McAlle played 508 games for the Midlanders, making him the fifth highest-serving player in their history.

After a brief spell at Bramall Lane, where he won the Fourth Division title, he moved to Derby County, where he finished his league career in the second tier. John's last ever professional match came for Derby against Barnsley in March 1984 wearing the number 10 shirt. He finished his playing career at non-league Harrisons FC, based in Wolverhampton.

McAlle moved into landscape gardening after football, but has since retired and lives in Brewood, South Staffordshire.

In recognition of his outstanding service to Wolverhampton Wanderers he was inducted into their 'Hall of Fame' in May 2015.

== Honours ==
Wolverhampton Wanderers

- Football League Cup: 1973–74

Sheffield United

- Football League Fourth Division: 1981–82
