= Frans Janssens =

Belgian footballer (1945–2024)

- Janssens with Lierse, around 1980

Personal information
- Date of birth: 25 September 1945
- Place of birth: Turnhout, Belgium
- Date of death: 8 January 2024 (aged 78)
- Place of death: Lier, Belgium
- Height: 1.70 m (5 ft 7 in)
- Position: Forward

Senior career*
Years	Team	Apps	(Gls)
1963–1966	Turnhout		
1966–1981	Lierse		
1982–1983	Sint-Niklase SK		
1983–1984	KVVOG Vorselaar		

International career
1964	Belgium U19	4	(0)
1972–1973	Belgium	2	(0)
- * Club domestic league appearances and goals

Frans Janssens (25 September 1945 – 8 January 2024) was a Belgian footballer who played as a forward, most notably for Lierse. He earned two caps for the Belgium national team, and participated in the 1970 FIFA World Cup and UEFA Euro 1972. Janssens died on 8 January 2024, at the age of 78.

== Honours ==
Lierse

- Belgian Cup: 1968–69

Belgium

- UEFA Euro third place: 1972

Individual

- Man of the Season (Belgian First Division): 1973–74

== Sources ==
- Royal Belgian Football Association: Number of caps
