= 1970–71 Austrian football championship =

53rd season of top-tier football league in Austria

Austrian Nationalliga
- Season: 1970–71
- Champions: FC Wacker Innsbruck

Statistics of Austrian Nationalliga in the 1970–71 season.

== Overview ==
It was contested by 16 teams, and FC Wacker Innsbruck won the championship.

== League standings ==
Pos	Team	Pld	W	D	L	GF	GA	GD	Pts
1	FC Wacker Innsbruck	30	20	4	6	68	30	+38	44
2	SV Austria Salzburg	30	18	7	5	64	33	+31	43
3	SK Rapid Wien	30	16	9	5	65	36	+29	41
4	First Vienna FC	30	14	9	7	55	39	+16	37
5	Linzer ASK	30	15	6	9	53	44	+9	36
6	VÖEST Linz	30	13	10	7	44	38	+6	36
7	SK Admira Wien Energie	30	14	4	12	55	57	−2	32
8	SV Wattens	30	12	7	11	50	45	+5	31
9	Wiener Sportclub	30	10	9	11	54	40	+14	29
10	FK Austria Wien	30	10	9	11	43	45	−2	29
11	Grazer AK	30	12	4	14	36	54	−18	28
12	SK Sturm Graz	30	10	4	16	35	42	−7	24
13	1. Simmeringer SC	30	8	7	15	31	55	−24	23
14	Schwarz-Weiß Bregenz	30	7	5	18	31	60	−29	19
15	SC Wacker	30	5	6	19	43	59	−16	16
16	WSG Radenthein	30	4	4	22	31	81	−50	12

Source: rsssf.com

== Results ==
Home \ Away	ADM	ASZ	AWI	BRE	FIR	GAK	LIN	RAD	RWI	SIM	STU	VOE	WIN	WAK	WAT	WIE
Admira Wien Energie		4–0	1–0	2–1	1–1	0–1	4–3	1–3	1–2	3–0	0–1	2–2	2–1	6–2	3–1	0–1
Austria Salzburg	1–2		2–1	1–0	1–1	1–2	3–0	2–2	3–3	2–0	3–0	2–1	1–0	6–2	1–0	1–1
Austria Wien	1–2	0–6		0–0	2–0	2–1	1–2	2–1	1–1	0–0	1–0	2–2	1–1	1–1	2–3	1–3
Bregenz	2–3	1–4	2–3		1–3	1–2	0–1	2–1	0–4	0–2	0–4	1–1	0–4	2–1	2–1	0–7
First Vienna	5–0	1–0	2–2	2–1		3–1	1–3	4–0	2–2	4–2	3–0	0–1	0–4	1–1	2–2	2–0
Grazer AK	2–2	0–1	1–0	1–4	2–3		1–4	2–0	0–6	2–0	2–1	1–0	0–1	0–3	1–2	1–1
Linzer ASK	2–1	0–0	1–4	2–2	0–0	2–1		4–3	1–3	6–1	0–2	0–1	1–3	2–1	1–1	1–1
Radenthein	3–4	1–4	1–5	1–1	0–2	1–4	2–4		1–4	2–1	1–0	1–2	1–2	0–4	0–4	1–0
Rapid Wien	6–1	1–3	4–1	1–0	2–1	2–0	0–1	1–1		3–1	1–0	1–1	0–5	1–1	1–2	3–3
Simmeringer SC	1–2	0–2	0–1	0–0	1–0	4–1	2–1	1–0	0–0		0–0	2–1	2–3	1–1	2–2	0–0
Sturm Graz	1–2	1–3	0–0	0–2	1–2	0–1	2–3	1–1	2–1	2–1		0–0	3–1	4–2	2–1	1–2
VÖEST Linz	3–1	2–1	3–3	5–2	1–3	1–1	0–1	3–1	0–4	4–0	1–0		1–0	1–1	3–2	1–5
Wacker Innsbruck	5–2	2–1	1–0	2–0	2–3	6–0	1–0	5–0	1–1	2–0	4–3	0–0		1–0	1–1	0–3
Wacker Wien	3–1	3–4	2–1	0–1	1–2	0–1	2–3	3–1	0–1	2–3	1–2	0–1	2–4		2–4	1–1
Wattens	2–2	2–2	2–4	1–0	2–0	1–2	0–3	1–0	0–1	7–1	1–2	1–1	0–3	1–0		2–1
Wiener SC	1–0	0–2	0–1	1–2	2–2	2–2	1–1	8–1	3–5	2–3	1–0	0–1	2–3	2–1	0–1	

Legend: Blue = home team win; Yellow = draw; Red = away team win.
