= Esko Malm =

Finnish footballer and manager (born 1940)

Personal information
- Date of birth: 23 August 1940 (age 86)
- Place of birth: Valkeakoski, Finland
- Position: Midfielder

Senior career*
Years	Team	Apps	(Gls)
1958–1972	Haka	??	(??)

International career
1963	Finland	0	(0)

Managerial career
- 1979–1981: Finland
- * Club domestic league appearances and goals

Esko Malm (born 23 August 1940 in Valkeakoski) is a Finnish former footballer and manager who earned 1 cap at international match in 1963. but the match is not recognized as full internationals match by FIFA. At club level Malm played for FC Haka between 1958–72. After playing career he became a manager of Haka and in 1979 he was chosen as a manager of Finland.
