= Ólafur Júlíusson =

Icelandic footballer

Personal information
- Full name: Ólafur Eggert Júlíusson
- Date of birth: 11 July 1951 (age 75)
- Position: Midfielder

Senior career*
Years	Team	Apps	(Gls)
1971–1982	Keflavík		

International career
1972–1980	Iceland	13	(1)
- * Club domestic league appearances and goals

Ólafur Eggert Júlíusson (born 11 July 1951) is a retired Icelandic football midfielder.
