= István Megyesi =

Hungarian footballer (1949–2016)

Personal information
- Full name: László Harsányi
- Date of birth: March 31, 1949
- Place of birth: Csanytelek, Csongrád-Csanád, Hungary
- Date of death: July 25, 2016 (aged 67)
- Place of death: Hungary
- Position: Full-back

Youth career
- ???–1968: Békéscsaba VTSK

Senior career*
Years	Team	Apps	(Gls)
1968–1979	Ferencvárosi	213	(3)

International career
1966–1975	Hungary	9	(0)
- * Club domestic league appearances and goals

István Megyesi (31 March 1949 – 25 July 2016) was a Hungarian footballer. He played as a full-back for Ferencvárosi throughout the 1970s. He also represented his native country of Hungary within the same decade.

== Club career ==
Megvesi began his youth career with Békéscsaba VTSK before deciding to play for Ferencvárosi in the beginning of the 1968 Nemzeti Bajnokság I with his debut being marked on 22 June in a 1–0 victory against Vasas at the Népstadion with his debut season seeing the club win the national title. Throughout his early career, he was initially competing with Győző Martos for the left-back position of the club before Martos later found himself playing as a right-back. Throughout the 1970s, he would win the 1971–72, 1972–73, 1975–76 and 1977–78 Magyar Kupa though his most significant moments would come from his participation throughout the Ferencváros campaign throughout the 1974–75 European Cup Winners' Cup. Throughout their campaign to the semi-finals, they had knocked Cardiff City, Liverpool and Malmö FF in the first few rounds. His highest contribution in the tournament came during the match against Red Star Belgrade. Initially, the match was going well for Ferencvárosi as László Pusztai scored the first goal of the match in the 7th minute. However, the tides of the match would turn to a draw with Mihalj Keri scoring the equalizer at the 50th minute. Matters were made worse when László Bálint was sent off in the 70th minute and Zoran Filipović scoring the second goal at the 77th minute. However, around the 83rd minute, German referee Walter Eschweiler granted Megyesi a penalty kick, to which he would score the equalizer that led the club to the 1975 European Cup Winners' Cup final against Soviet club Dynamo Kyiv where, despite losing, still came out as runners-up in the tournament.

== International career ==
Megyesi was first called up to represent Hungary in a friendly against West Germany on 9 September 1970 following the 1970 FIFA World Cup where the match ended 3–1 in favor for Die Mannschaft. His next five international appearances would consist of friendlies against Austria, East Germany, Bulgaria and Yugoslavia as he was prone to injuries within the domestic Hungarian league. His final appearance would be on 7 June 1975 in a 4–0 defeat against Bulgaria for the 1976 Summer Olympics qualifiers. Prior to this, he was called up for the Hungary youth team in 1966 for two matches.

== Later life ==
In 1994, Megyesi briefly managed the youth sector of Erzsébeti Spartacus MTK LE.

Megyesi died on 25 July 2016 at the age of 68 from a long illness.

In 2021, the sports field in his native Csanytelek was renamed after Megyesi to honor his legacy.
