= Wietse Veenstra =

Dutch footballer

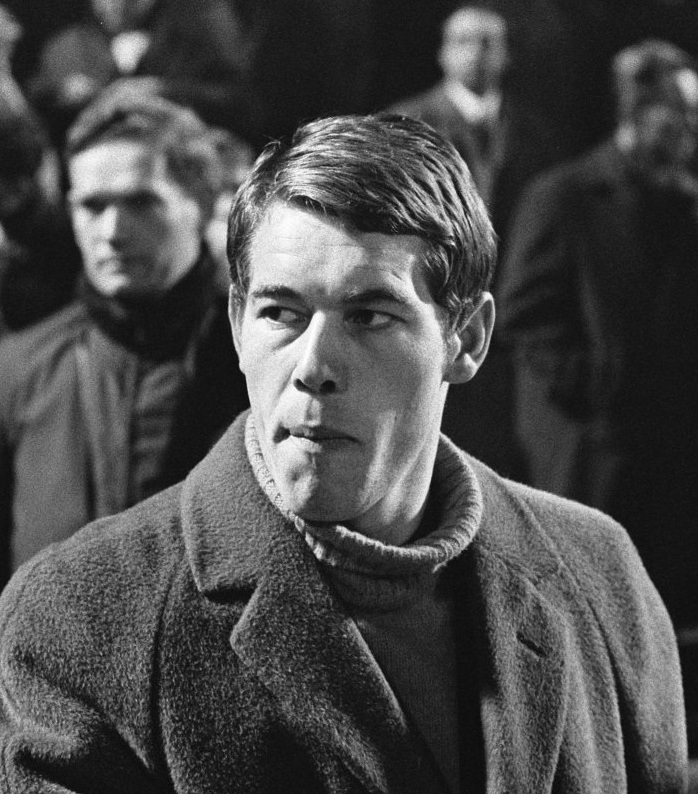
- Veenstra in 1969

Personal information
- Date of birth: 18 February 1946 (age 80)
- Place of birth: Scheemda, Netherlands
- Position: Midfielder

Senior career*
Years	Team	Apps	(Gls)
1964–1969	Go Ahead Eagles	135	(55)
1969–1971	PSV Eindhoven	64	(23)
1971–1972	F.C. Brugeois		
1972–1973	Racing White		
1973–1976	R.W.D. Molenbeek		
1976–1979	Cercle Brugge		

International career
1968–1970	Netherlands	9	(1)
- * Club domestic league appearances and goals

Wietse Veenstra (born 18 February 1946) is a Dutch former footballer who played as a midfielder. He made nine appearances for the Netherlands national team from 1968 to 1970.
