= Aad Mansveld =

Dutch footballer

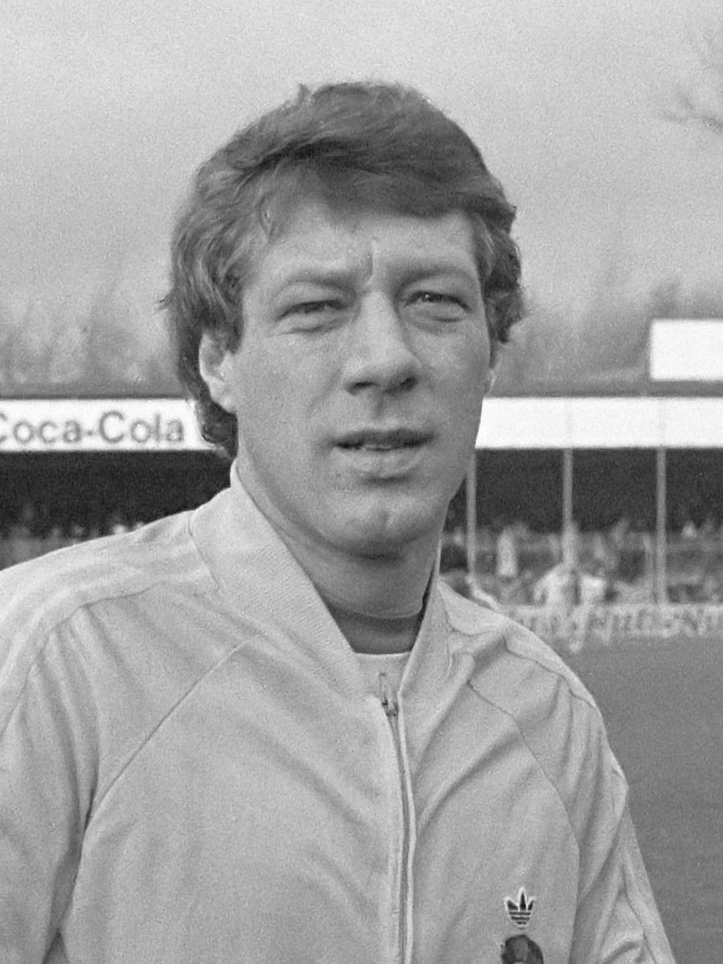
- Mansveld in 1981.

Personal information
- Full name: Adriaan Mansveld
- Date of birth: 14 July 1944
- Place of birth: The Hague, Netherlands
- Date of death: 5 December 1991 (aged 47)
- Place of death: The Hague, Netherlands
- Height: 6 ft 1 in (1.85 m)
- Position: Libero

Senior career*
Years	Team	Apps	(Gls)
1964–1977	FC Den Haag	370	(54)
1967	→ Golden Gate Gales (loan)		
1977–1979	Feyenoord	35	(8)
1979–1981	FC Den Haag	77	(8)
1981–1982	FC Utrecht	11	(0)
1982–1983	FC Den Haag	11	(0)
Total		504	(70)

International career
1972–1973	Netherlands	6	(0)
- * Club domestic league appearances and goals

Adriaan Mansveld (14 July 1944 – 5 December 1991) was a Dutch footballer who played as a libero.

== Career ==
Born in The Hague, Mansveld played club football for FC Den Haag, Golden Gate Gales, Feyenoord and FC Utrecht. A stand at Zuiderpark Stadion, ADO Den Haag's stadium, was named after Mansveld. At ADO Den Haag's new stadium, the Cars Jeans Stadium, a statue of Mansveld was also erected.

He also earned 6 caps for the Netherlands national team between 1972 and 1973. He played in a number of qualifying matches for the 1974 FIFA World Cup, but was injured for the actual tournament.

He died at the age of 47 from cancer.
