= Zuiderpark Stadium =

Football stadium

Coordinates: 52°03′22″N 4°17′24″E

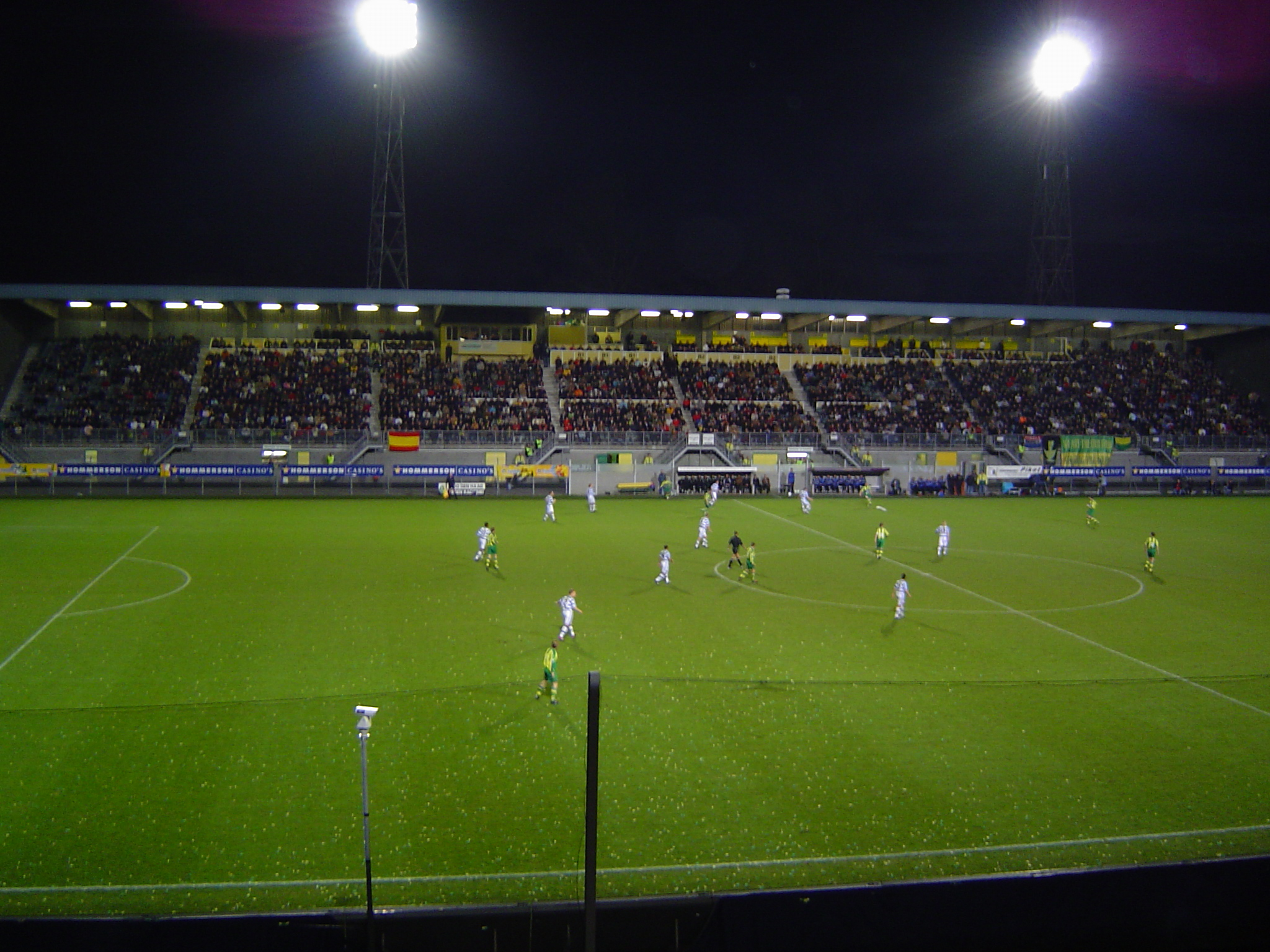
View from the north stands, towards the south stands, 2004.

The Zuiderpark Stadium or Zuiderparkstadion (Dutch pronunciation: [ˈzœydərpɑr(ə)kˌstaːdijɔn], Dutch for Southern Park Stadium) was an 11,000-seat stadium in The Hague, Netherlands. It was the home of football club ADO Den Haag.

For many years after the club's inauguration in 1905, they played football in many different temporary venues, eventually settling in the 'Zuiderpark' in 1925. The stadium was temporarily abandoned on 21 February 1945, near the end of World War II. The War left the club lacking funds with which to maintain the ground. Reportedly, horses were allowed to graze on the abandoned field.

The cold winter conditions of 1946–47 left the stadium in a deplorable state, with the covered tribune the only stand left in a serviceable condition. Nevertheless, plans were afoot to renovate the stadium and to expand its capacity; these were completed in 1949 and the first game played was on 9 August 1949 between ADO Den Haag and Feyenoord Rotterdam.

In 1957, the capacity of the renovated stadium was expanded still further to 25,000 spectators. Later, on 8 March 1973, the stadium entered its modern age with a new club building housing a restaurant, among several other modern amenities catering to the players and club members.

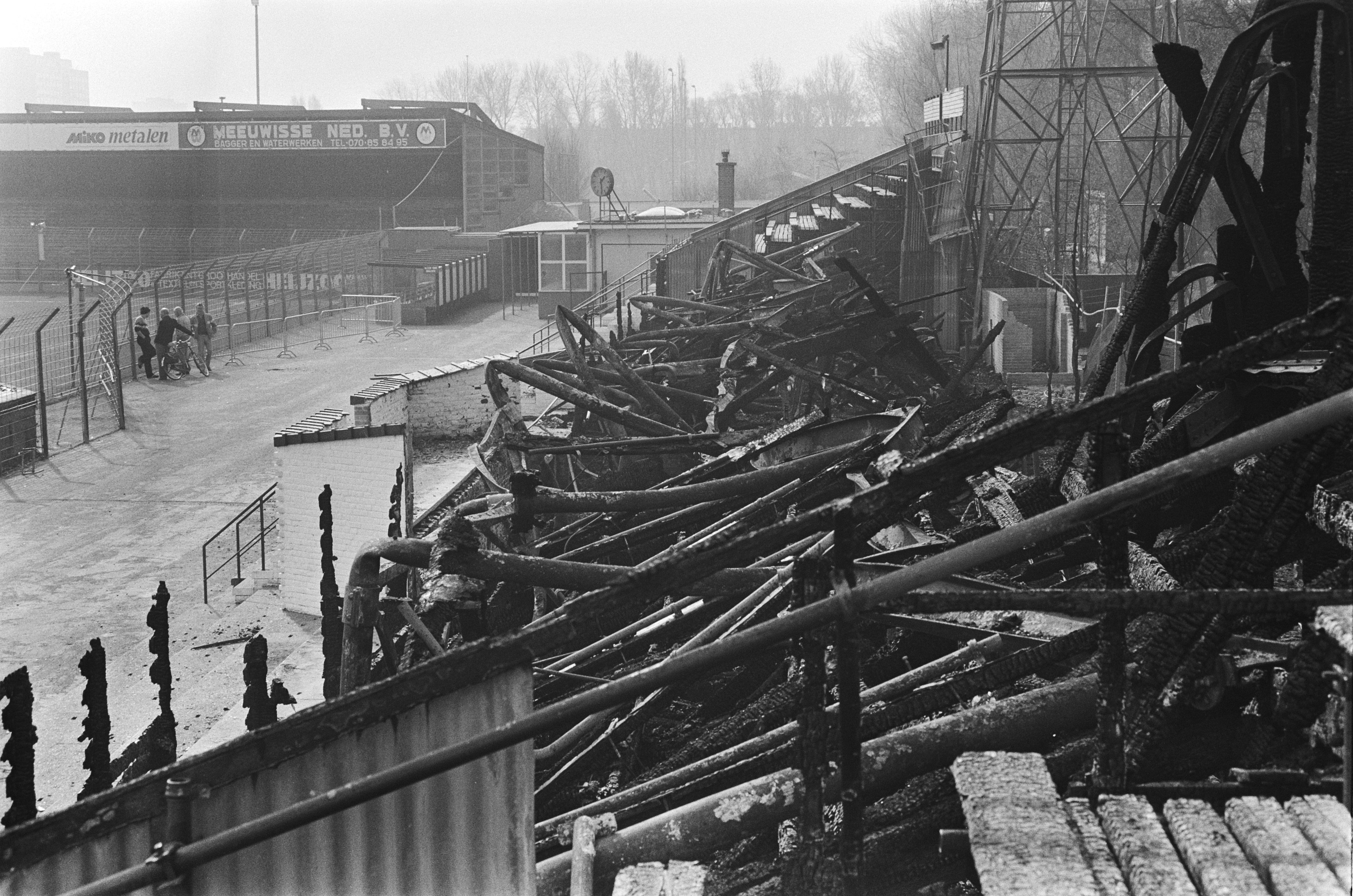
Fire damage to the South Tribune

On 3 April 1982, hooligans of the club burned down the South Tribune. The fire was set after a 4–0 loss to HFC Haarlem. It damaged the ground's oldest stand dating back to 1928 and caused $500,000 in damages. The damaged part was rebuilt and opened in 1986.

On 7 November 1993, the North Tribune was renamed 'Aad Mansveldtribune', after Aad Mansveld. In 1994, the municipality of The Hague decided to develop the 'Zuiderpark' as a 'football theatre' and the West Tribune 'Jan Knijnenburg Gezinstribune' was inaugurated at around this time. It was renamed the 'Hyundaitribune' in 2001.

On 22 April 2007, ADO played their last home game in the Zuiderpark Stadium. The following season they moved to the Den Haag Stadion.
