= Hotel 't Silveren Seepaerd fire =

1971 fire in Eindhoven, Netherlands

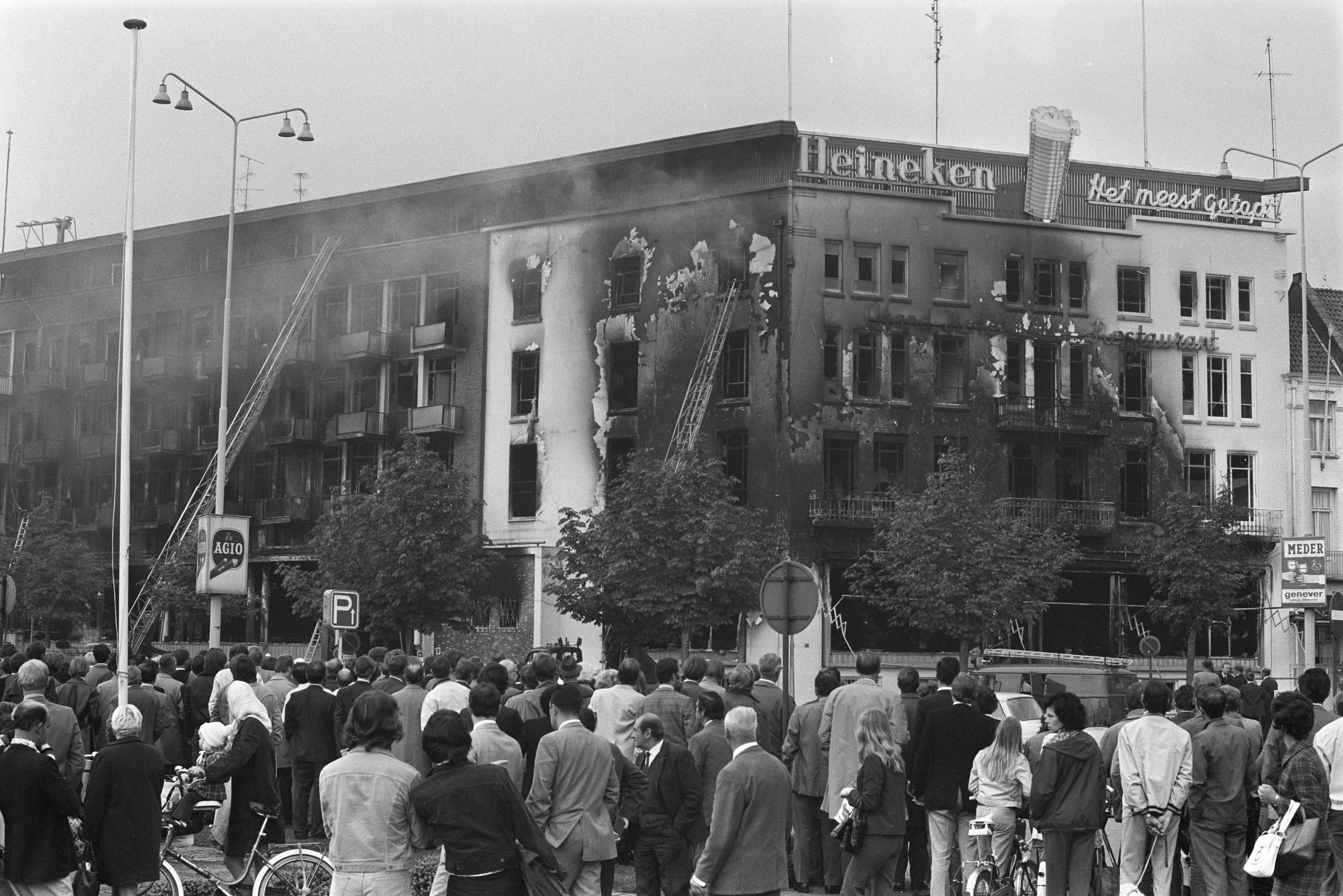
- Aftermath of the fire at Hotel 't Silveren Seepaerd
- Date: 28 September 1971
- Location: 51.44140°N 5.48053°E
- Type: Fire
- Deaths: 11
- Injuries: 19

The Hotel 't Silveren Seepaerd fire took place in the night of 28 September 1971 in Eindhoven, Netherlands.

== Fire ==
Hotel 't Silveren Seepaerd was a hotel-restaurant on the Stationsplein in Eindhoven. A fire broke out during the night, causing a flashover on the ground floor, and swiftly expanded over all four storeys of the hotel. The escape routes in the hotel were poorly lit, and because of the smoke development in the hotel, escape was nearly impossible.

The cause of the fire was never found. At approximately 5:30 CET a bus driver discovered a fire in the restaurant of the hotel. The driver alerted the porter, but because there had already been so much smoke development, they did not dare enter the hotel. The fire department arrived a few minutes later to see several guests who lay in the streets after jumping from the hotel windows, and many others visibly trapped on the upper floors. The fire fighters initially focused on saving as many hotel guests as possible before extinguishing the fire.

Only at 7:45 in the morning the fire was declared under control; rendering the fire safe took up an entire day.

== Victims ==
Of the 86 people in the hotel, 11 were killed, two as a result of attempting to escape. An additional 19 guests were (severely) injured.

The previous day, the Chemie Halle began their stay in the hotel. They had played a match on 15 September against PSV Eindhoven in the first round of the 1971–72 UEFA Cup in Halle. One of the Chemie Halle players, 21-year-old midfielder Wolfgang Hoffmann, died in the fire, while several others were injured. The return match never took place.

== Aftermath ==
The fire in Hotel 't Silveren Seepaerd resulted in strict fire safety regulations for hotels and restaurants. The hotel was never rebuilt. Nowadays there is an apartment complex at the former location of the hotel.

After the fire there was no compensation for the victims by the insurance companies. On 28 April 2006 PSV played a friendly match against Hallescher FC in remembrance of the fire.

== See also ==
- Hotel Polen fire
