= Tadeusz Nowak =

Polish footballer

Personal information
- Full name: Tadeusz Zdzisław Nowak
- Date of birth: 28 November 1948 (age 77)
- Place of birth: Trzcińsko, Poland
- Height: 1.81 m (5 ft 11 in)
- Positions: Midfielder; winger; striker

Senior career*
Years	Team	Apps	(Gls)
1966–1968	Górnik Słupiec		
1969–1970	Zagłębie Wałbrzych	35	(3)
1970–1978	Legia Warsaw	189	(33)
1979–1980	Bolton Wanderers	24	(1)
Total		248	(37)

International career
1972–1977	Poland	2	(0)

Managerial career
- 1982–1985: Piast Nowa Ruda
- * Club domestic league appearances and goals

Tadeusz Zdzisław Nowak (born 28 November 1948) is a Polish former professional footballer.

== Career ==
Nicknamed "Ferrari", in 1979, Nowak signed for Bolton Wanderers in the English top flight, with the club paying Legia Warsaw 50,000 pounds and 3 tractors. In the process, he became the first foreign player to play for Bolton Wanderers.

== Honours ==
Legia Warsaw

- Polish Cup: 1972–73
