= Oeki Hoekema =

Dutch footballer

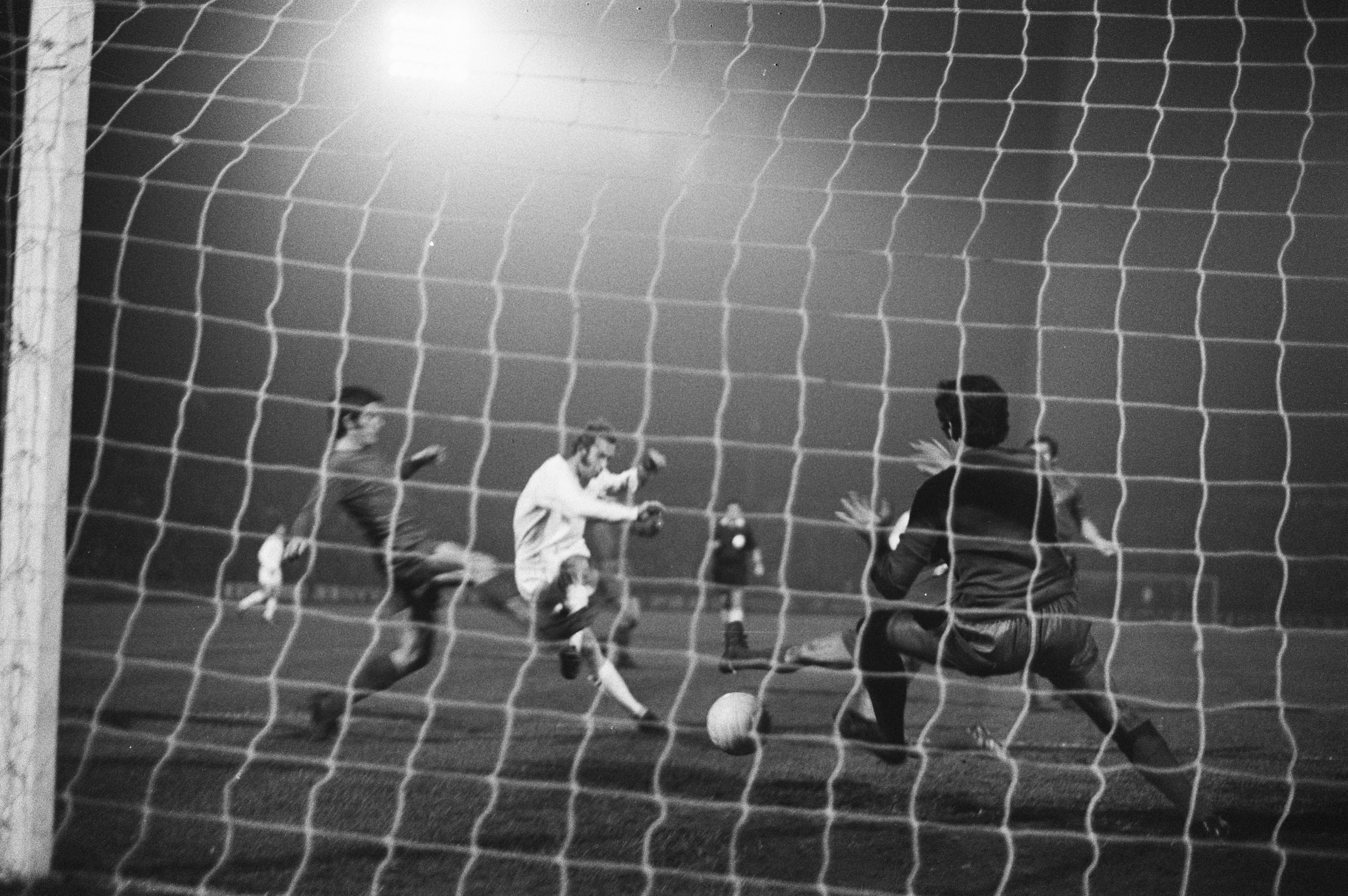
- Hoekema scores against Real Madrid (1971)

Personal information
- Full name: Uilke Piebe Hoekema
- Date of birth: 28 January 1949 (age 77)
- Place of birth: Pingjum, Netherlands
- Position: Forward

Senior career*
Years	Team	Apps	(Gls)
1964–1966	Cambuur	25	(3)
1966–1971	Go Ahead	119	(42)
1971–1973	PSV	56	(10)
1973–1974	De Graafschap	33	(11)
1974–1976	Lierse	71	(14)
1976–1979	FC Den Haag	90	(13)
1979–1980	Cambuur	43	(2)
1981	Wageningen	13	(0)
Total		450	(95)

International career
1971	Netherlands	1	(1)
- * Club domestic league appearances and goals

Uilke Piebe "Oeki" Hoekema (born 28 January 1949) is a Dutch retired footballer who played as a forward for Go Ahead, PSV, De Graafschap, Lierse SK, ADO Den Haag, Cambuur, and FC Wageningen. Known for his social activism, he played once for the Netherlands national team.

== Club career ==
Hoekema was born in Pingjum and made his professional debut for Cambuur aged 17 and immediately scored within 4 minutes. He had a lengthy spell at Go Ahead and had a two-year stint with Dutch giants PSV. Born in a socialist family, he was critical of the Philips company when he played for PSV and was issued a gag order by the club. He finished his career with FC Wageningen after returning to Cambuur and playing abroad in Belgium for Lierse.

== International career ==
Hoekema earned one cap for the Netherlands, in an 8-0 win over Luxembourg in which he also scored. He would later boycott the 1982 FIFA World Cup because of the Argentinian junta and was also outspoken about the 2022 FIFA World Cup being assigned to Qatar.

== Personal life ==
Hoekema's father Jan was also a professional footballer, who played for Veendam and VV Leeuwarden, Cambuur's predecessor club.

As a kid he could not pronounce his official name, Uilke Piebe, so it was shortened as Oeki. His name was later chosen the third best Dutch footballers name by listeners to an Algemeen Dagblad podcast and was used in a song by Meindert Talma.

After retiring as a player, Hoekema started a business in Swedish wooden prefab houses.
