= Wietze Couperus =

Dutch footballer

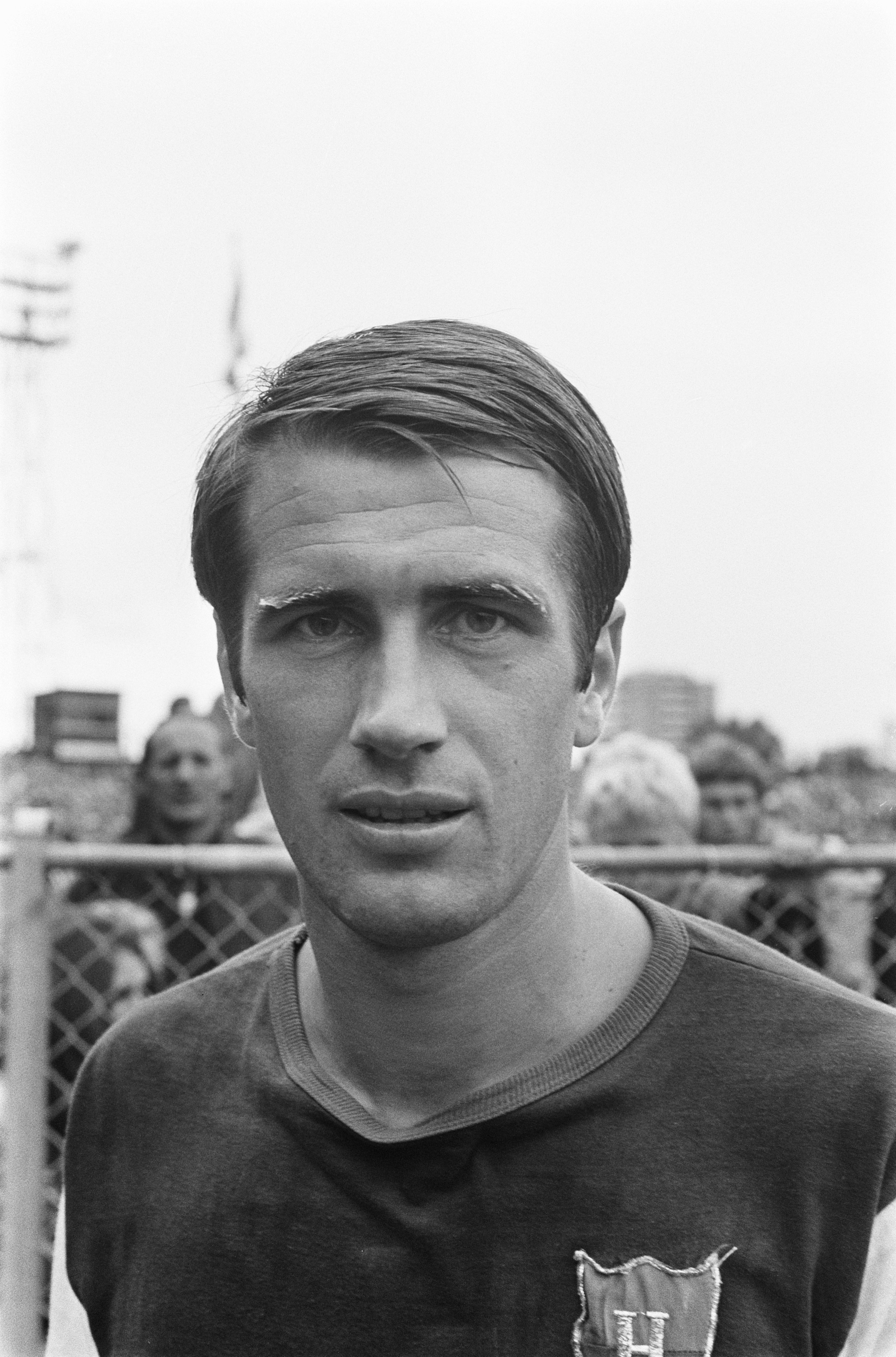

Personal information
- Date of birth: 16 March 1942 (age 84)
- Place of birth: Sneek, Netherlands
- Position: Forward

Youth career
- 1953–1959: LSC 1890

Senior career*
Years	Team	Apps	(Gls)
1960–1963	Blauw-Wit	12	(3)
1963–1964	Leeuwarden	21	(4)
1964–1965	ZFC	23	(0)
1965–1970	Haarlem	163	(95)
1970–1972	FC Den Haag	53	(25)
1972–1973	FC Amsterdam	30	(6)
1973–1975	Telstar	46	(15)
Total		348	(154)

International career
1970	Netherlands	1	(0)
- * Club domestic league appearances and goals

Wietze Couperus (born 16 March 1942) is a Dutch retired footballer. He played in one match for the Netherlands national football team in 1970.

Couperus was born in Frisia, his father Bieuwe had a bakery. He started playing for LSC 1890 when eleven years old before moving to Amsterdam with his parents.

He is one of a handful players who scored for FC Den Haag in European club competitions.
