= Eef Mulders =

Dutch footballer (born 1948)

Personal information
- Full name: Evardus Franciscus Henricus Mulders
- Date of birth: 28 November 1948 (age 77)
- Position: Forward

Senior career*
Years	Team	Apps	(Gls)
1968–1970	FC Den Bosch '67		
1970–1974	PSV Eindhoven	96	(19)
1974–1975	AZ'67 Alkmaar	3	(0)

International career
1971	Netherlands	1	(0)
- * Club domestic league appearances and goals

Evardus Franciscus Henricus Mulders (born 28 November 1948) is a Dutch former footballer who played as a forward. He made one appearance for the Netherlands national team in 1971.
