= Klokke Stadion =

Multi-use stadium in Bruges, Belgium

- De Klokke, Albert Dyserynck Stadion
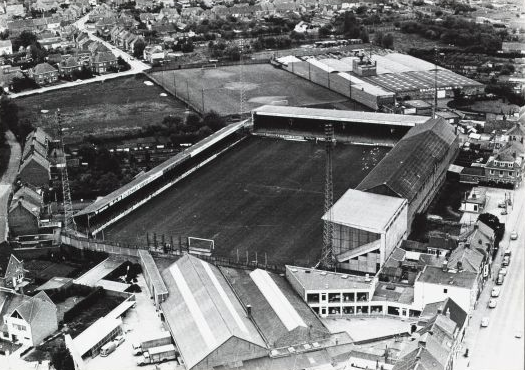
- Interactive map of Klokke Stadion
- Location: Bruges, Belgium
- Coordinates: 51°11′48.28″N 3°12′7.68″E
- Capacity: 25,000

Construction
- Opened: 1912
- Closed: 1975

Tenant
- Club Brugge K.V.

Klokke Stadion, from 1931 on known as Albert Dyserynck Stadion, was a multi-use stadium in Bruges, Belgium. It was the home ground of the Club Brugge K.V. until the "Olympia Park" (current Jan Breydel Stadium named in 2000) opened in 1975. The stadium held 25,000 spectators. It was named after Albert Dyserynck, who was president from 1919 to 1931 and had donated the property to the Club.

In the popular language, this stadion keeps the name of "Klokke" after a so-called pub in front of the main entrance. "Klokke" in Flemish dialect is "a clock".
