= List of Tottenham Hotspur F.C. records and statistics =

Tottenham Hotspur are an English association football club based in Tottenham, London. Founded in 1882, it was when they entered the Southern League that they found success, winning the competition in 1900, and in the following season of 1901, while still classed as a non-league club, famously going on to win the FA Cup. They are among the most successful clubs in English football overall, with 26 league and cup victories, and were the first team to win the League and FA Cup double in the 20th century; the first English team to win a major European trophy and the first English team to win two different European trophies.

Steve Perryman holds the club's record for the most appearances, 866 between 1969 and 1986 (of which 655 were in the league, another club record). The record goalscorer is Harry Kane, who scored 280 goals for the club between 2011 and 2023 (213 in the league, where he ranks second-highest for the club behind Jimmy Greaves' 220).

== Club records ==
=== Record wins ===
- Record win: 13–2 v Crewe Alexandra, FA Cup, 3 February 1960
- Record league win: 9–0 v Bristol Rovers, Division 2, 22 October 1977
- Record Premier League win: 9–1 v Wigan Athletic, 22 November 2009
- Most league goals scored: 10–4 v Everton, 11 October 1958
- Record cup win: 13–2 v Crewe Alexandra, FA Cup, 3 February 1960
- Record home win: 13–2 v Crewe Alexandra, FA Cup, 3 February 1960
- Record UEFA Cup win: 9–0 v Keflavík, 28 September 1971 (aggregate 15–1, including 6–1 away win on 14 September 1971)
- Record Champions League qualification win: 4-0 v Young Boys, 25 August 2010 (aggregate 6-3, including 2-3 away loss)
- Record Champions League group stage win: 5-0 v Red Star Belgrade, 22 October 2019
- Record Champions League playoff win: 3-0 v Borussia Dortmund, 13 February 2019
- Record away win: 7–0 v Tranmere Rovers, FA Cup, 4 January 2019
- Record Premier League away win: 7–1 v Hull City, 21 May 2017
- Record away win in a UEFA match: 6–0 v Drogheda United, UEFA Cup, 14 September 1983
- Record League Cup away win: 6–0 v Oldham Athletic, Football League Cup, 23 September 2004

=== Record defeats ===
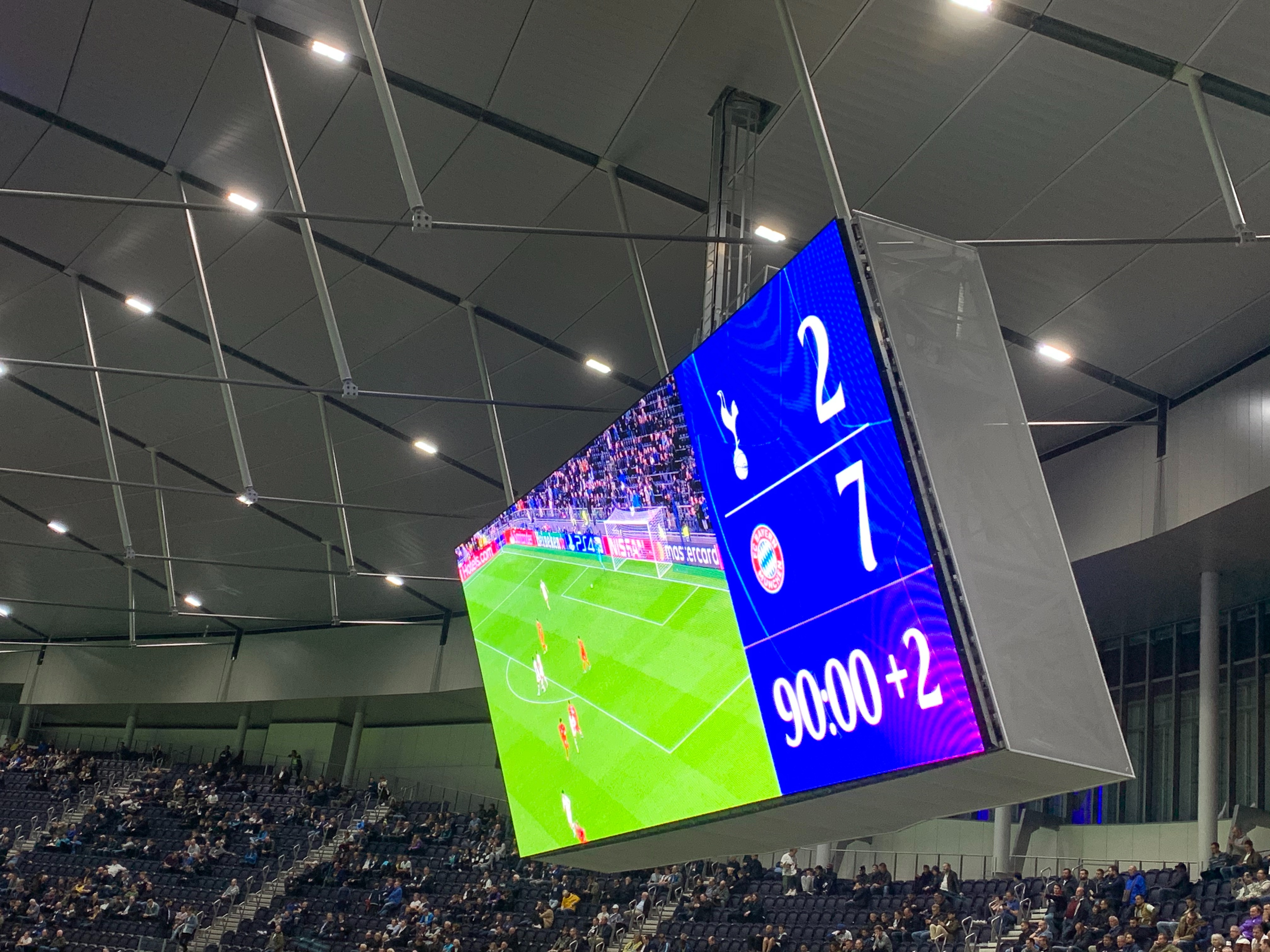
Scoreline against Bayern Munich at home in the Champions League

- Record defeat: 0–8 v 1. FC Köln, UEFA Intertoto Cup, 22 July 1995
- Record Champions League defeat: 2–7 v Bayern Munich, 1 October 2019
- Most league goals conceded: 2–8 v Derby County, Division 1, 16 October 1976
- Record league defeat: 0–7 v Liverpool, Division 1, 2 September 1978
- Record Premier League defeat:

1–7 v Newcastle United, 28 December 1996
0–6 v Sheffield United, 2 March 1993
0–6 v Manchester City, 24 November 2013

- Record cup defeat: 1–6 v Newcastle United, FA Cup, 23 December 1999
- Record home defeat: 0–6

v Sunderland, Football League First Division, 19 December 1914
v Arsenal, Football League First Division, 6 March 1935

- Record away defeat: 0–8 v 1. FC Köln, UEFA Intertoto Cup, 22 July 1995

=== Additional records ===
- Most league points (under 2 for a win system): 70, Division 2, 1919–20
- Most league points (under 3 for a win system): 86, Premier League, 2016–17
- Most league goals: 115, Division 1, 1960–61
- Most goals in a season: 49 Clive Allen, 1986–87
- Youngest first team player: Alfie Devine, 16 years, 163 days against Marine in the FA Cup (A), 10 January 2021
- Youngest goal scorer: Alfie Devine, 16 years, 163 days against Marine, FA Cup (A), 10 January 2021
- Oldest first team player: Brad Friedel, 42 years, 305 days against Benfica (A), 20 March 2014

=== Biggest attendances ===
- Biggest attendance: 110,820, 20 April 1901, v Sheffield United, Crystal Palace Stadium, FA Cup Final
- Biggest domestic home attendance (White Hart Lane): 75,038, 5 March 1938, v Sunderland, FA Cup
- Biggest domestic home attendance (Wembley Stadium): 83,222, 10 February 2018, v Arsenal, Premier League
- Biggest domestic home attendance (Tottenham Hotspur Stadium): 62,027, 12 May 2022, v Arsenal, Premier League
- Biggest home attendance (UEFA club competition): 85,512, 2 November 2016, v Bayer Leverkusen, Wembley Stadium, UEFA Champions League
- Biggest away attendance (domestic): 75,696, 26 August 2007, v Manchester United, Old Trafford, Premier League
- Biggest away attendance (UEFA club competition): 95,000, 20 March 1985, v Real Madrid, Santiago Bernabéu Stadium, UEFA Cup

== National records ==
- The first club to win the 'Double' of the FA Cup and Football League First Division in the 20th Century (1960–61)
- The only non-league club, since the creation of the Football League in 1888, to win the FA Cup (1901)
- The first club to win the League Cup at the new Wembley Stadium (2007–08)
- Most consecutive League victories from the start of a top flight season: 11 (1960–61)
- Most victories in a Football League First Division season: 31 out of 42 games in 1960–61
- Most points in a Division 2 season (2 points for a win): 70 (1919–20)
- Most Premier League goals scored by a player in a calendar year: 39 by Harry Kane in 2017
- Most goals scored in a Premier League game: 9, v Wigan Athletic 22 November 2009 (joint record)
- Most goals scored by an individual player in a Premier League game: 5, Jermain Defoe v Wigan Athletic 22 November 2009 (joint record)
- Most prolific goal scorers out of any English team in European football competition, scoring an average 2.1 goals per game
- The first team to concede 1,000 goals in the Premier League
- Most expensive British transfer (at the time): Jimmy Greaves from AC Milan £99,999 December 1961
- Most expensive British transfer (at the time): Martin Chivers from Southampton £125,000 January 1968
- Most expensive British transfer (at the time): Martin Peters from West Ham £200,000 March 1970
- Most expensive British transfer (at the time): Chris Waddle to Marseille £4,250,000 July 1989
- Most expensive British transfer (at the time): Paul Gascoigne to Lazio £5,500,000 June 1992
- Most expensive British transfer (at the time, and a then world record): Gareth Bale to Real Madrid £85,300,000 September 2013
- Most consecutive Premier League games without a 0-0 draw: 136 until run ended 1 January 2026

== English records ==
- The first English club to win a major European competition – European Cup Winners Cup (1963)
- The first English club to win two different European trophies – European Cup Winners Cup (1963) and UEFA Cup (1972).
- English record of eight consecutive victories in major European competition
- Most matches played in the UEFA Cup / UEFA Europa League by an English club

== European records ==
- The first English club to win a UEFA competition (European Cup Winners' Cup, 1963)
- The first club to win the UEFA Cup (1972)
- The first team to score two or more goals in every UEFA Champions League group game (2010–11)
- The joint biggest winning margin in a UEFA Cup Winners' Cup final - 5-1 vs Atletico Madrid (1963)

== World Cup winners ==
The following Tottenham Hotspur players were part of FIFA World Cup winning squads while at the club:

- Jimmy Greaves, (England) ENG, 1966 (did not play in the final)
- Hugo Lloris, (France) FRA, 2018
- Cristian Romero, (Argentina) ARG, 2022
- Pedro Porro, (Spain) ESP, 2026

The following Tottenham Hotspur players were part of FIFA World Cup winning squads either before joining the club or after leaving:

- Martin Peters, (England) ENG, 1966
- Osvaldo Ardiles, (Argentina) ARG, 1978
- Ricardo Villa, (Argentina) ARG, 1978 (did not play in the final)
- Jürgen Klinsmann, (Germany) GER, 1990
- Fernando Llorente, (Spain) ESP, 2010 (did not play in the final)
- Juan Foyth, (Argentina) ARG, 2022 (did not play in the final)

== Premier League record ==
For results from all of Tottenham Hotspur's seasons, see List of Tottenham Hotspur F.C. seasons

Tottenham has been a member of the Premier League since its creation in 1992–93. A fourth-place finish in the 2009–10 season put the club into the UEFA Champions League qualifying stages for the first time, heralding a run where Tottenham finished in the top six in eleven consecutive Premier League seasons from 2009–10 to 2019–20 and qualified for the UEFA Champions League in four consecutive seasons from 2015–16 to 2018–19.

Season	Position	Played	Won	Drawn	Lost	For	Against	Goal difference	Points
2025–26	17	38	10	11	17	48	57	-9	41
2024–25	17	38	11	5	22	64	65	-1	38
2023–24	5	38	20	6	12	74	61	13	66
2022–23	8	38	18	6	14	70	63	7	60
2021–22	4	38	22	5	11	69	40	29	71
2020–21	7	38	18	8	12	68	45	18	62
2019–20	6	38	16	11	11	61	47	14	59
2018–19	4	38	23	2	13	67	39	28	71
2017–18	3	38	23	8	7	74	36	38	77
2016–17	2	38	26	8	4	86	26	60	86
2015–16	3	38	19	13	5	69	35	34	70
2014–15	5	38	19	7	12	58	53	5	64
2013–14	6	38	21	6	11	55	51	4	69
2012–13	5	38	21	9	8	66	46	20	72
2011–12	4	38	20	9	9	66	41	25	69
2010–11	5	38	16	14	8	55	46	9	62
2009–10	4	38	21	7	10	67	41	26	70
2008–09	8	38	14	9	15	45	45	0	51
2007–08	11	38	11	13	14	66	61	5	46
2006–07	5	38	17	9	12	57	54	3	60
2005–06	5	38	18	11	9	53	38	15	65
2004–05	9	38	14	10	14	47	41	6	52
2003–04	14	38	13	6	19	47	57	−10	45
2002–03	10	38	14	8	16	51	62	−11	50
2001–02	9	38	14	8	16	49	53	−4	50
2000–01	12	38	13	10	15	47	54	−7	49
1999–2000	10	38	15	8	15	57	49	8	53
1998–99	11	38	11	14	13	47	50	−3	47
1997–98	14	38	11	11	16	44	56	−11	44
1996–97	10	38	13	7	18	44	51	−6	46
1995–96	8	38	16	13	9	50	38	12	61
1994–95	7	42	16	14	12	66	58	8	62
1993–94	15	42	11	12	19	54	59	−5	45
1992–93	8	42	16	11	15	60	66	−6	59

== Top goal scorers ==
=== Top scorers by season ===
Season	Player(s)	Total goals	Domestic League	Domestic Cup	Europe
2025–26	(Brazil) Richarlison	12	11	0	1
2024–25	(Wales) Brennan Johnson	18	11	2	5
2023–24	(South Korea) Son Heung-min	17	17	0	0
2022–23	(England) Harry Kane	32	30	1	1
2021–22	(England) Harry Kane	27	17	4	6
2020–21	(England) Harry Kane	33	23	2	8
2019–20	(England) Harry Kane	24	18	0	6
2018–19	(England) Harry Kane	24	17	2	5
2017–18	(England) Harry Kane	41	30	4	7
2016–17	(England) Harry Kane	35	29	4	2
2015–16	(England) Harry Kane	28	25	1	2
2014–15	(England) Harry Kane	31	21	3	7
2013–14	(Togo) Emmanuel Adebayor	14	11	1	2
2012–13	(Wales) Gareth Bale	26	21	2	3
2011–12	(Togo) Emmanuel Adebayor	18	17	1	0
2010–11	(Netherlands) Rafael van der Vaart	15	13	0	2
2009–10	(England) Jermain Defoe	24	18	6	0
2008–09	(England) Darren Bent	17	12	1	4
2007–08	(Bulgaria) Dimitar Berbatov	23	15	3	5
2007–08	(Republic of Ireland) Robbie Keane	23	15	4	4
2006–07	(Bulgaria) Dimitar Berbatov	23	12	4	7
2005–06	(Republic of Ireland) Robbie Keane	16	16	0	0
2004–05	(England) Jermain Defoe	22	13	9	0
2003–04	(Republic of Ireland) Robbie Keane	16	14	2	0
2002–03	(England) Teddy Sheringham	13	12	1	0
2002–03	(Republic of Ireland) Robbie Keane	13	13	0	0
2001–02	(England) Les Ferdinand	15	9	6	0
2000–01	(Ukraine) Serhii Rebrov	12	9	3	0
1999–2000	(Norway) Steffen Iversen	17	14	2	1
1998–99	(Norway) Steffen Iversen	13	9	4	0
1997–98	(Germany) Jürgen Klinsmann	9	9	0	0
1997–98	(France) David Ginola	9	6	3	0
1996–97	(England) Teddy Sheringham	8	7	1	0
1995–96	(England) Teddy Sheringham	24	16	8	0
1994–95	(Germany) Jürgen Klinsmann	29	20	9	0
1993–94	(England) Teddy Sheringham	16	14	2	0
1992–93	(England) Teddy Sheringham	28	21	7	0
1991–92	(England) Gary Lineker	35	28	5	2
1990–91	(England) Gary Lineker	19	15	4	0
1990–91	(England) Paul Gascoigne	19	7	12	0
1989–90	(England) Gary Lineker	26	24	2	0
1988–89	(England) Chris Waddle	14	14	0	0
1987–88	(England) Clive Allen	13	11	2	0
1986–87	(England) Clive Allen	49	33	16	0
1985–86	(England) Mark Falco	25	19	6	0
1984–85	(England) Mark Falco	29	22	3	4
1983–84	(Scotland) Steve Archibald	28	21	2	5
1982–83	(Scotland) Steve Archibald	15	11	2	2
1982–83	(England) Garth Crooks	15	8	4	3
1981–82	(England) Garth Crooks	18	13	3	2
1980–81	(Scotland) Steve Archibald	25	20	5	0
1979–80	(England) Glenn Hoddle	22	19	3	0
1978–79	(England) Peter Taylor	12	11	1	0
1977–78	(Scotland) John Duncan	20	16	4	0
1976–77	(England) Chris Jones	9	9	0	0
1975–76	(Scotland) John Duncan	25	20	5	0
1974–75	(Scotland) John Duncan	12	12	0	0
1973–74	(England) Martin Chivers	23	17	0	6
1972–73	(England) Martin Chivers	33	17	8	8
1971–72	(England) Martin Chivers	44	25	9	10
1970–71	(England) Martin Chivers	29	22	7	0
1969–70	(England) Martin Chivers	11	11	0	0
1969–70	(England) Jimmy Greaves	11	8	3	0
1968–69	(England) Jimmy Greaves	36	27	9	0
1967–68	(England) Jimmy Greaves	29	23	3	3
1966–67	(England) Jimmy Greaves	31	25	6	0
1965–66	(England) Jimmy Greaves	16	15	1	0
1964–65	(England) Jimmy Greaves	35	29	6	0
1963–64	(England) Jimmy Greaves	36	35	0	1
1962–63	(England) Jimmy Greaves	44	37	2	5
1961–62	(England) Jimmy Greaves	30	21	9	0
1960–61	(England) Bobby Smith	33	28	5	0
1959–60	(England) Bobby Smith	30	25	5	0
1958–59	(England) Bobby Smith	35	32	3	0
1957–58	(England) Bobby Smith	38	36	2	0
1956–57	(England) Bobby Smith	19	18	1	0
1956–57	(England) Alfie Stokes	19	18	1	0
1955–56	(England) Bobby Smith	13	10	3	0
1954–55	(Republic of Ireland) Johnny Gavin	14	13	1	0
1953–54	(England) George Robb	16	16	0	0
1953–54	(England) Sonny Walters	16	14	2	0
1952–53	(England) Len Duquemin	24	18	6	0
1951–52	(England) Les Bennett	21	20	1	0
1950–51	(England) Sonny Walters	15	15	0	0
1949–50	(England) Les Medley	19	18	1	0
1948–49	(England) Les Bennett	19	19	0	0
1947–48	(England) Len Duquemin	21	16	5	0
1946–47	(England) Les Bennett	17	16	1	0

Players in bold are currently contracted to Tottenham Hotspur.

=== Top 10 all-time scorers ===
As of 25 May 2025

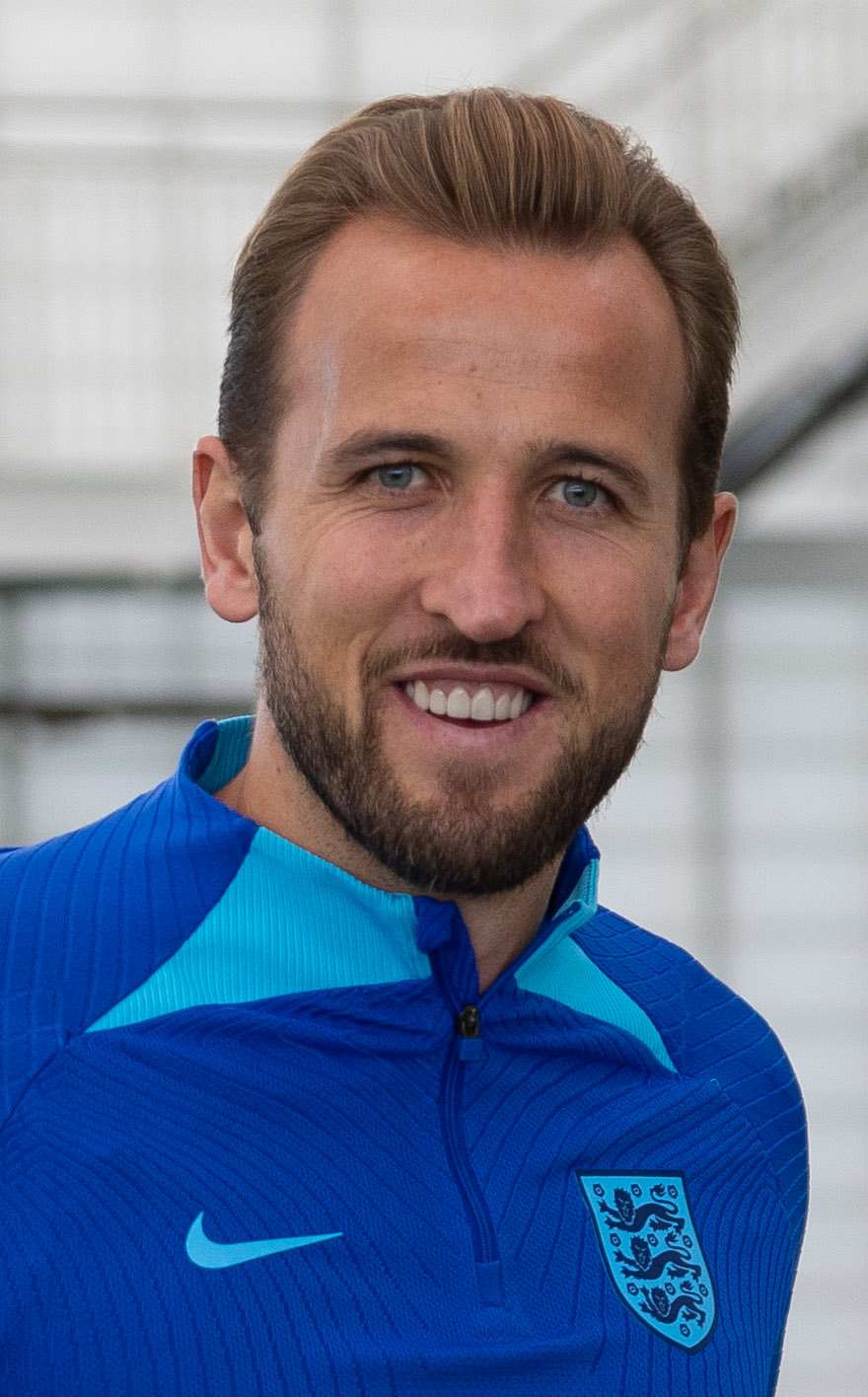
Harry Kane is the club's all-time top goalscorer.

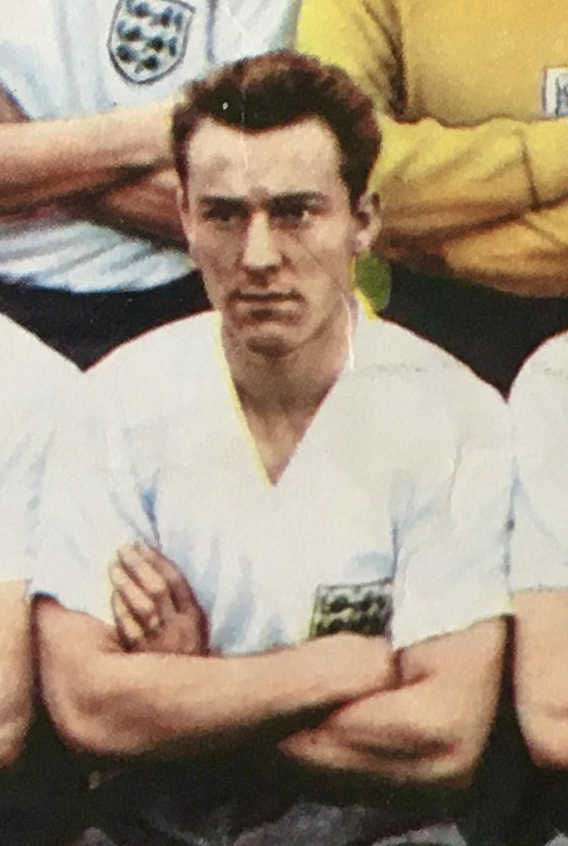
Jimmy Greaves was the club's all-time top goalscorer until 2023.

Rank	Player	Club appearances	Total goals	Domestic League	Domestic Cup	Europe	Goals per game
1	(England) Harry Kane	435	280	213	22	45	0.64
2	(England) Jimmy Greaves	381	268	220	39	9	0.70
3	(England) Bobby Smith	317	208	176	22	10	0.66
4	(England) Martin Chivers	367	174	118	34	22	0.47
5	(South Korea) Son Heung-min	454	173	127	19	27	0.38
6	(Wales) Cliff Jones	378	159	135	17	7	0.42
7	(England) Jermain Defoe	362	143	91	29	23	0.40
8	(England) George Hunt	198	138	125	13	0	0.70
9	(Guernsey) Len Duquemin	307	134	114	20	0	0.44
10	(Scotland) Alan Gilzean	439	133	93	27	13	0.30

Players in bold are currently contracted to Tottenham Hotspur.

=== Top 10 European competition scorers ===
For an in-depth review of Tottenham Hotspur in European competition, see Tottenham Hotspur F.C. in European football

As of 21 May 2025

Rank	Player	Appearances	Goals	Goals per game
1	(England) Harry Kane	76	45	0.59
2	(South Korea) Son Heung-min	70	27	0.38
3	(England) Jermain Defoe	35	23	0.66
4	(England) Martin Chivers	32	22	0.69
5	(England) Mark Falco	25	13	0.52
5	(Scotland) Alan Gilzean	28	13	0.46
5	(England) Martin Peters	32	13	0.41
8	(Brazil) Lucas Moura	38	12	0.32
8	(Bulgaria) Dimitar Berbatov	16	12	0.75
8	(Argentina) Erik Lamela	43	12	0.29

Players in bold are currently contracted to Tottenham Hotspur.

=== 10 youngest goal scorers ===
As of 7 July 2026

Rank	Player	Date of birth	Date of first goal	Age	Competition	Ref
1	(England) Alfie Devine	1 August 2004	10 January 2021	16 years, 163 days	FA Cup	
2	(England) Frank Saul	23 August 1943	10 September 1960*	17 years, 18 days	Football League First Division	
3	(Republic of Ireland) Andy Turner	23 March 1975	5 September 1992	17 years, 165 days	Premier League	
4	(England) **Mikey Moore**	11 August 2007	30 January 2025	17 years, 172 days	UEFA Europa League	
5	(England) Derek Possee	14 February 1946	25 January 1964	17 years, 345 days	Football League First Division	
6	(England) Steve Perryman	21 December 1951	26 December 1969	18 years, 5 days	Football League First Division	
7	(Wales) Gareth Bale	16 July 1989	1 September 2007	18 years, 47 days	Premier League	
8	(England) David Howells	15 December 1967	22 February 1986	18 years, 69 days	Football League First Division	
9	(England) Richard Cooke	4 September 1965	19 November 1983	18 years, 76 days	Football League First Division	
10	(England) Sol Campbell	18 September 1974	5 December 1992	18 years, 78 days	Premier League	

* indicates player was the youngest at the time.
The table is for the players' first goal only, eg Frank Saul's second and third goals in season 1960-61 were scored while he was younger than when Derek Possee scored his first.
Players in bold are currently contracted to Tottenham Hotspur.

== Top appearances ==
=== Top 10 all-time appearances ===
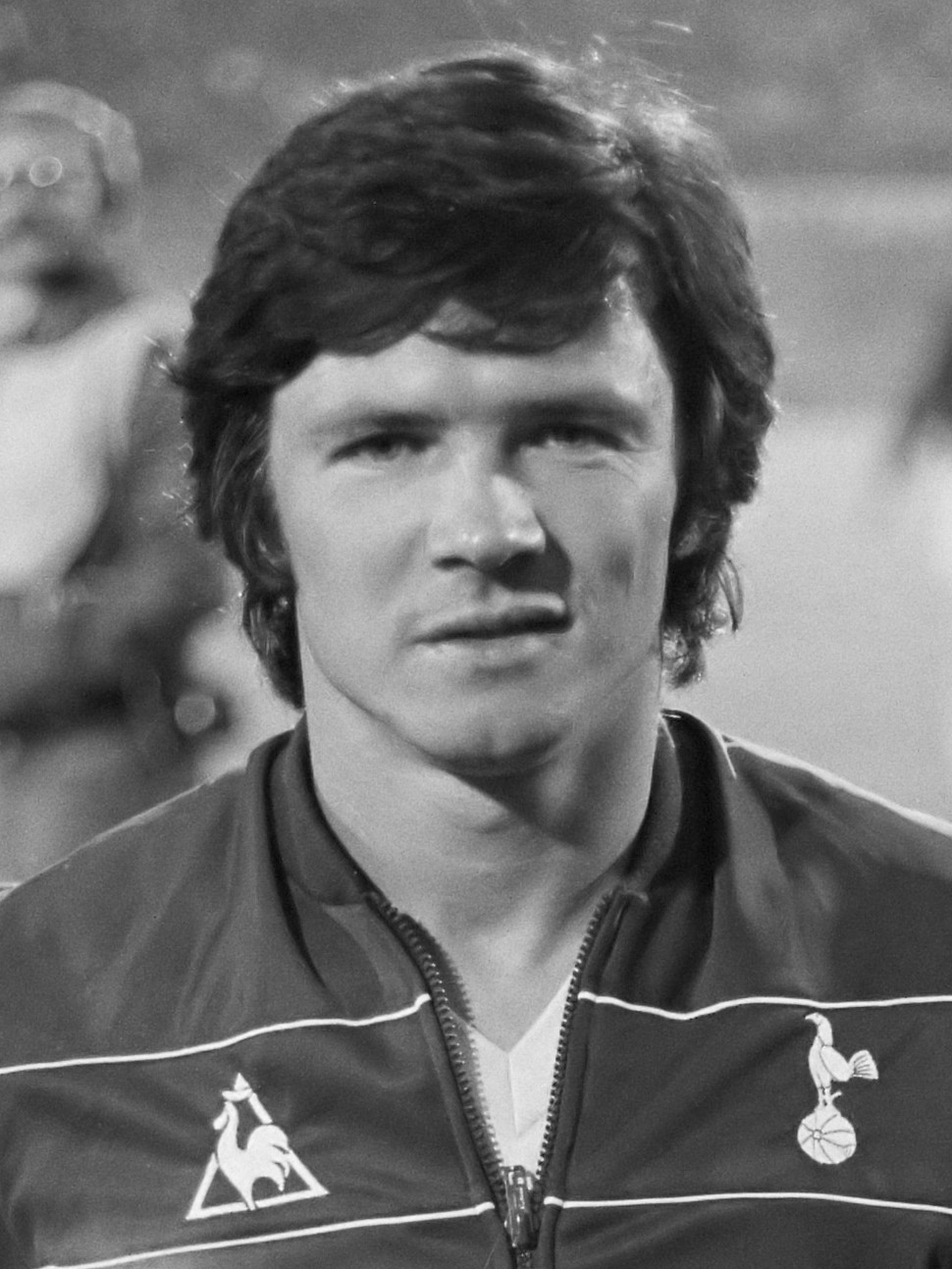
Steve Perryman made a record 854 club appearances.

As of 25 May 2025

Rank	Player	Years	Club appearances
1	(England) Steve Perryman	1969–1986	866
2	(England) Gary Mabbutt	1982–1998	611
3	(Northern Ireland) Pat Jennings	1964–1977	590
4	(England) Tom Morris	1899–1912	523
5	(England) Cyril Knowles	1964–1975	506
6	(England) Glenn Hoddle	1975–1987	490
7	(South Korea) Son Heung-min	2015–2025	454
8	(England) Ted Ditchburn	1946–1958	452
9	(France) Hugo Lloris	2012–2023	447
10	(Scotland) Alan Gilzean	1964–1974	439

Players in bold are currently contracted to Tottenham Hotspur.

=== Top 10 all-time international appearances while with the club ===
As of 14 October 2025

Rank	Player	Years	International appearances
1	(France) Hugo Lloris	2012–2023	107
2	(South Korea) Son Heung-min	2015–2025	91
3	(Wales) **Ben Davies**	2014–present	90
4	(England) Harry Kane	2015–2023	84
5	(Belgium) Jan Vertonghen	2012–2020	80
6	(Northern Ireland) Pat Jennings	1964–1977	75
7	(Republic of Ireland) Robbie Keane	2002–2008, 2009–2011	66
8	(Belgium) Toby Alderweireld	2015–2021	65
9	(Denmark) Christian Eriksen	2013–2020	58
10	(Mexico) Giovani dos Santos	2008–2012	54

Players in bold are currently contracted to Tottenham Hotspur.

=== 10 youngest first team debutants ===
As of 7 July 2026

Rank	Player	Date of birth	Date of debut	Age	Competition	Ref
1	(England) Alfie Devine	1 August 2004	10 January 2021	16 years, 163 days	FA Cup	
2	(England) Dane Scarlett	24 March 2004	26 November 2020*	16 years, 247 days	UEFA Europa League	
3	(England) **Mikey Moore**	11 August 2007	14 May 2024	16 years, 277 days	Premier League	
4	(England) John Bostock	15 January 1992	6 November 2008*	16 years, 295 days	UEFA Cup	
5	(Scotland) Ally Dick	25 April 1965	20 February 1982*	16 years, 301 days	Football League First Division	
6	(Scotland) Neil McNab	4 June 1957	3 April 1974*	16 years, 303 days	Football League First Division	
7	(England) **Luca Williams-Barnett**	1 October 2008	24 September 2025	16 years, 359 days	EFL Cup	
8	(England) Terry Gibson	23 December 1962	29 December 1979	17 years, 6 days	Football League First Division	
9	(England) Frank Saul	23 August 1943	7 September 1960*	17 years, 15 days	Football League First Division	
10	(Republic of Ireland) Stephen Carr	29 August 1976	22 September 1993	17 years, 24 days	EFL Cup	

* indicates player was the youngest at the time.
Spurs' youngest player in the UEFA Champions League is Jun'ai Byfield, who made his debut on 20 January 2026. Aged 17 years and 45 days, Byfield would be 11th in the table.
Players in bold are currently contracted to Tottenham Hotspur.

== Transfers ==
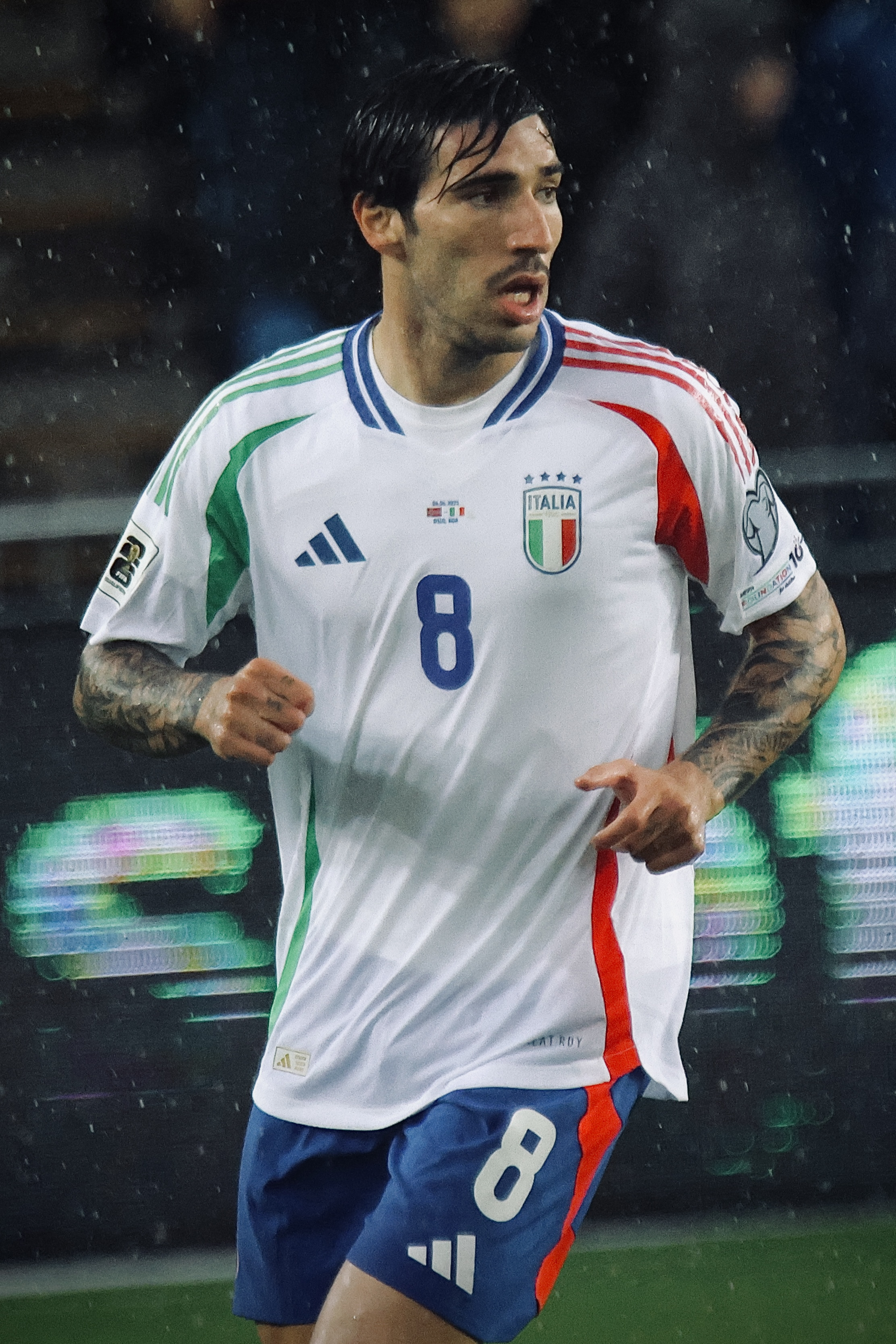
Tottenham Hotspur's record signing Sandro Tonali, pictured in 2025 playing for Italy

=== Highest transfer fees paid ===
Rank	Player	From	Fee	Year	Ref
1	(Italy) **Sandro Tonali**	(England) Newcastle United	**£92.5M**+ CR	2026	
2	(Portugal) **Mateus Fernandes**	(England) West Ham United	**£85M** CR	2026	
3	(Brazil) **Sávio**	(England) Manchester City	**£75M**+	2026	
4	(France) Tanguy Ndombele	(France) Lyon	**£55.4M**+ CR	2019	
5	(England) **Dominic Solanke**	(England) Bournemouth	**£55M**+	2024	
6	(Ghana) **Mohammed Kudus**	(England) West Ham United	**£55M**	2025	
7	(Netherlands) **Jan Paul van Hecke**	(England) Brighton & Hove Albion	**£52M**	2026	
8	(Netherlands) **Xavi Simons**	(Germany) RB Leipzig	**£51M**	2025	
9	(Brazil) **Richarlison**	(England) Everton	**£50M**+	2022	
10	(Wales) Brennan Johnson	(England) Nottingham Forest	**£47.5M**	2023	

CR = Tottenham Hotspur club record
+ means there were to be undefined add ons, which may or may not have been paid.
Players in bold are currently contracted to Tottenham Hotspur.

=== Highest transfer fees received ===
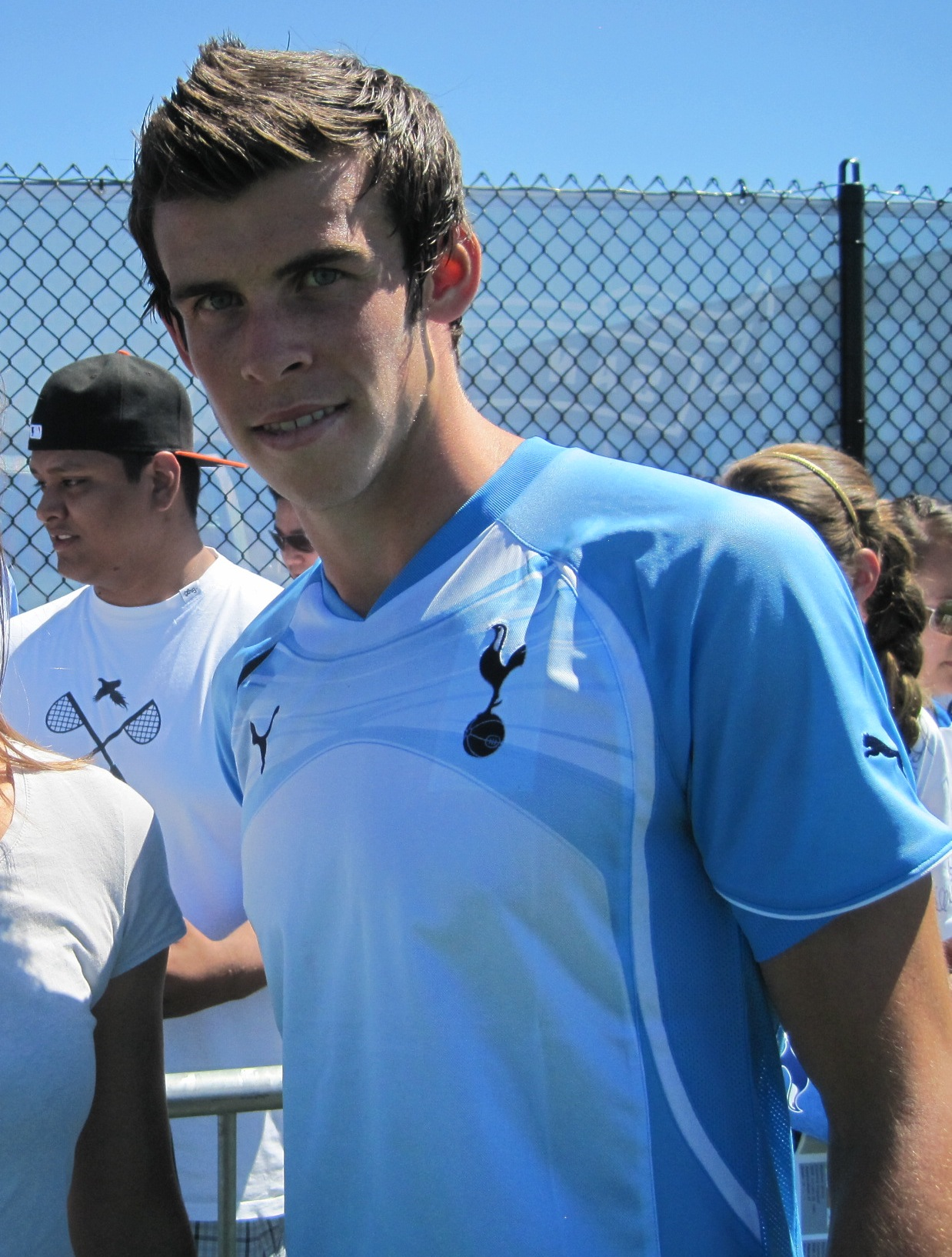
Gareth Bale was once the club's most expensive departure, being sold for a then-world record fee to Real Madrid in 2013.

Rank	Player	To	Fee	Year	Ref
1	(England) Harry Kane	(Germany) Bayern Munich	**£100M**+ CR	2023	
2	(Wales) Gareth Bale	(Spain) Real Madrid	**£86M** CR	2013	
3	(Croatia) Luka Vušković	(England) Brighton & Hove Albion	**£46M**+	2026	
4	(England) Kyle Walker	(England) Manchester City	**£45M**+	2017	
5	(Wales) Brennan Johnson	(England) Crystal Palace	**£35M**	2026	
6	(Argentina) Cristian Romero	(Spain) Atlético Madrid	**£34.2M**	2026	
7	(Croatia) Luka Modrić	(Spain) Real Madrid	**£33M** CR	2012	
8	(Bulgaria) Dimitar Berbatov	(England) Manchester United	**£30.75M** CR	2008	
9	(Netherlands) Steven Bergwijn	(Netherlands) Ajax	**£26M**	2022	
10	(England) Djed Spence	(Italy) Inter Milan	**£25.6M**	2026	

CR = Tottenham Hotspur club record
The Bale transfer fee was a world record at the time.
+ means there were to be undefined add ons, which may or may not have been paid.

== Rankings ==
- 4th highest English all-time average attendance figure (34,923).
- Joint 3rd most successful side in all-time FA Cup history with eight wins.
- Joint 6th most successful side in all-time League Cup history with four wins.
- Joint 4th most successful English side in FIFA or UEFA club competitions by trophies won (4).
- 10th richest club in the world as ranked by Forbes: $3 Bn; £2.2 Bn (2025 9th; $3.3 Bn; £2.6 Bn)
- 9th highest income in the world for season 2024–25 with €672.6M (£585.56M), as ranked by accountancy firm Deloitte (9th in season 2023–24 with €615M; £519.86M).
- The highest number of players to represent England (80 as at 9 September 2025).
- The highest number of goals scored by players representing England (262 as of 2025).
- 15th (joint) in number of English league titles won (2).
- 6th in ranking of all time major honours won by football clubs in England (28).

=== UEFA rankings ===
Year	Rank	Co-efficient	Ref
2026	19	82.000	
2025	27	70.250	
2024	34	54.000	
2023	21	80.000	
2022	14	83.000	
2021	15	88.000	
2020	14	85.000	
2019	17	78.000	
2018	19	67.000	
2017	20	77.192	
2016	23	74.256	
2015	21	84.078	
2014	19	75.949	
2013	24	69.592	
2012	27	66.882	
2011	18	78.157	
2010	30	56.371	
2009	29	55.899	
2008	33	55.996	
2007	55	40.618	

*Tottenham Hotspur had no ranking points in 2005 and 2006 due to
non-participation in UEFA club football for five seasons or more.

== Honours ==
Sources: Tottenham Hotspur's Trophies and Honours

=== Domestic ===
League Competitions:

- Football League First Division:
  - Winners (2): 1950–51, 1960–61 (D)
- Football League Second Division:
  - Winners (2): 1919–20, 1949–50

Cup competitions:

- FA Cup:
  - Winners (8): 1900–01, 1920–21, 1960–61 (D), 1961–62, 1966–67, 1980–81, 1981–82, 1990–91
- League Cup:
  - Winners (4): 1970–71, 1972–73, 1998–99, 2007–08
- FA Charity Shield/FA Community Shield:
  - Winners (7): 1921, 1951, 1961, 1962, 1967*, 1981*, 1991* (*shared)

(D) indicates won the double of Football League and FA Cup that season

=== European ===
- UEFA Cup Winners' Cup
  - Winners: 1962–63
- UEFA Cup/UEFA Europa League:
  - Winners (3): 1971–72, 1983–84, 2024–25
- Anglo-Italian League Cup:
  - Winners: 1971–72

=== Historical competitions (all levels) ===
- Southern League:
  - Winners: 1899–1900
- Western League:
  - Winners: 1903–04
- London League Premier Division Champions:
  - Winners: 1902–03
- Football League South 'C' Division Champions:
  - Winners: 1939–40
- Southern Professional Charity Cup:
  - Winners (3): 1901–02, 1904–05, 1906–07
- Sheriff of London Charity Shield:
  - Winners (2): 1901–02, 1933–34
- London Challenge Cup:
  - Winners (8): 1910–11, 1928–29, 1936–37, 1947–48, 1958–59, 1963–64, 1970–71, 1973–74

=== Friendly tournaments ===
- Norwich Charity Cup:
  - Winners: 1919–20
- Norwich Hospital Charity Cup
  - Winners (2): 1946–47, 1949–50 (joint)
- Ipswich Hospital Charity Cup Winners:
  - Winners: 1951–52 (joint)
- Costa Del Sol Tournament:
  - Winners (2): 1965, 1966
- Nolia Cup:
  - Winners: 1977
- Kirin Cup:
  - Winners: 1979
- Sun International Challenge Trophy:
  - Winners: 1983
- Peace Cup:
  - Winners: 2005
- Vodacom Challenge:
  - Winners (2): 2007, 2011
- Feyenoord Jubileum Tournament:
  - Winners: 2008
- Barclays Asia Trophy:
  - Winners: 2009
- Eusébio Cup:
  - Winners: 2010
- AIA Cup:
  - Winners: 2015
- Jockey Club Kitchee Centre Challenge Cup
  - Winners: 2017
- International Champions Cup
  - Winners: 2018
- Audi Cup
  - Winners: 2019
- Walter Tull Memorial Cup
  - Winners: 2022
- Singapore's Tiger Cup
  - Winners: 2023
- J.League World Challenge
  - Winners: 2024
- Herbalgy Trophy
  - Winners: 2025
