= 1973–74 Tottenham Hotspur F.C. season =

English football club season

Tottenham Hotspur
1973–74 season
- Chairman: Sidney A. Wale
- Manager: Bill Nicholson
- Stadium: White Hart Lane
- First Division: 11th
- FA Cup: Third round
- League Cup: Second round
- UEFA Cup: Runners-up
- Top goalscorer: League: Martin Chivers (17); All: Martin Chivers (23)
Home colours	Away colours

In the 1973–74 English football season, Tottenham Hotspur competed in the Football League First Division finishing in 11 place. Tottenham were eliminated in the early rounds of the League and FA Cups but reached the final of the UEFA Cup, to which they lost to Feyenoord.

== Squad ==
Squad at end of season

Note: Flags indicate national team as defined under FIFA eligibility rules; some limited exceptions apply. Players may hold more than one non-FIFA nationality.

Pos.	Nation	Player
GK	ENG	Barry Daines
GK	ENG	Terry Lee
GK	NIR	Pat Jennings
DF	ENG	Phil Beal
DF	ENG	Mike Dillon
DF	ENG	Ray Evans
DF	ENG	Cyril Knowles
DF	ENG	Terry Naylor
DF	ENG	Keith Osgood
DF	WAL	Mike England
DF	IRL	Joe Kinnear

Pos.	Nation	Player
MF	ENG	Ralph Coates
MF	ENG	Phil Holder
MF	ENG	Steve Perryman
MF	ENG	Martin Peters
MF	ENG	John Pratt
MF	ENG	Jimmy Neighbour
MF	SCO	Neil McNab
MF	NIR	Chris McGrath
FW	ENG	Martin Chivers
FW	SCO	Alan Gilzean

== Competition ==
=== League ===
Pos	Team	Pld	W	D	L	GF	GA	GAv	Pts	Qualification or relegation
9	Leicester City	42	13	16	13	51	41	1.244	42	
10	Arsenal	42	14	14	14	49	51	0.961	42	
11	Tottenham Hotspur	42	14	14	14	45	50	0.900	42	
12	Wolverhampton Wanderers	42	13	15	14	49	49	1.000	41	Qualification for the UEFA Cup first round (Note: Wolverhampton Wanderers qualified for the UEFA Cup as the 1973-74 Football League Cup winners.)
13	Sheffield United	42	14	12	16	44	49	0.898	40	

Source: World Football
Rules for classification: 1) Points; 2) Goal average; 3) Goals scored

=== League Cup ===
8 October 1973 Second round	Queens Park Rangers	1–0	Tottenham Hotspur	London
	Givens	Report		Stadium: Loftus Road; Attendance: 23,353

=== FA Cup ===
5 January 1974 Third round	Leicester City	1–0	Tottenham Hotspur	Leicester
	Earle	Report		Stadium: Filbert Street; Attendance: 28,280

=== UEFA Cup ===
==== First round ====
19 September 1973 First leg	Grasshoppers (Switzerland)	1–5	(England) Tottenham Hotspur	Zurich, Switzerland
	Noventa 44'	Report	Chivers 5', 72'; Evans 31'; Gilzean 80', 85'	Stadium: Hardturm; Attendance: 11200

3 October 1973 Second leg	Tottenham Hotspur (England)	4–1 (9–2 agg.)	(Switzerland) Grasshoppers	Tottenham, London
	Lador , 73' (o.g.); Peters 79', 88'; England 84'	Report	Elsener 24'	Stadium: White Hart Lane; Attendance: 18105

==== Second round ====
24 October 1973 First leg	Aberdeen (Scotland)	1–1	(England) Tottenham Hotspur	Aberdeen, Scotland
	Hermiston 87'	Report	Coates 15'	Stadium: Pittodrie Stadium; Attendance: 30000

7 November 1973 Second leg	Tottenham Hotspur (England)	4–1 (5–2 agg.)	(Scotland) Aberdeen	Tottenham, London
	Peters 13'; Neighbour 37'; McGrath 80', 89'	Report	Jarvie 54'	Stadium: White Hart Lane; Attendance: 21785

==== Third round ====
28 November 1973 First leg	Dinamo Tbilisi (Soviet Union)	1–1	(England) Tottenham Hotspur	Tbilisi, Soviet Union
	Asatiani 71'	Report	Coates 25'	Stadium: Boris Paichadze Dinamo Arena; Attendance: 45000

12 December 1973 First leg	Tottenham Hotspur (England)	5–1 (6–2 agg.)	(Soviet Union) Dinamo Tbilisi	Tottenham, London
	McGrath 29'; Chivers 52', 77'; Peters 61', 80'	Report	Ebralidze 55'	Stadium: White Hart Lane; Attendance: 18602

==== Quarter-final ====
6 March 1974 First leg	1. FC Köln (West Germany)	1–2	(England) Tottenham Hotspur	Cologne, Germany
	Müller 54'	Report	McGrath 18'; Peters 75'	Stadium: Stadion Köln; Attendance: 28000

20 March 1974 Second leg	Tottenham Hotspur (England)	3–0 (5–1 agg.)	(West Germany) 1. FC Köln	Tottenham, London
	Chivers 11'; Coates 15'; Peters 49'	Report		Stadium: White Hart Lane; Attendance: 40968

==== Semi-final ====
10 April 1974 First leg	Lokomotive Leipzig (West Germany)	1–2	(England) Tottenham Hotspur	Leipzig, Germany
	Löwe 55'	Report	Peters 15'; Coates 27'	Stadium: RB Arena; Attendance: 74000

24 April 1974 Second leg	Tottenham Hotspur (England)	2–0 (4–1 agg.)	(West Germany) Lokomotive Leipzig	Tottenham, London
	McGrath 57'; Chivers 87'	Report		Stadium: White Hart Lane; Attendance: 41280

==== Final ====
21 May 1974 First leg	Tottenham Hotspur (England)	2–2	(Netherlands) Feyenoord	Tottenham, London
	England 39' van Daele 64' (o.g.)	Report	van Hanegem 43' de Jong 85'	Stadium: White Hart Lane; Attendance: 46,281; Referee: Rudolf Scheurer (Switzerland)

29 May 1974 Second leg	Feyenoord (Netherlands)	2–0	(England) Tottenham Hotspur	Rotterdam, Netherlands
	Rijsbergen 43'; Ressel 84'	Report		Stadium: Feijenoord Stadion, Attendance: 59,317; Referee: Concetto Lo Bello (Italy)

== Appearances ==
League Statistics source:

Pos.	Name	First Division		FA Cup		League Cup		Europe		Total	
Pos.	Name	Apps	Goals	Apps	Goals	Apps	Goals	Apps	Goals	Apps	Goals
Goalkeepers
GK	(England) Barry Daines	5	0	0	0	1	0	2	0	7	0
GK	(England) Terry Lee	1	0	0	0	0	0	0	0	0	0
GK	(Northern Ireland) Pat Jennings	36	0	1	0	0	0	10	0	47	0
Defenders
DF	(England) Phil Beal	41	0	1	0	1	0	12	0	55	0
DF	(England) Mike Dillon	13+3	1	1	0	0	0	1+1	0	15+4	1
DF	(England) Ray Evans	40	2	1	0	1	0	11	1	53	3
DF	(England) Cyril Knowles	20	2	0	0	1	0	4	0	25	2
DF	(England) Terry Naylor	27+1	0	0	0	1	0	8+1	0	36+2	0
DF	(England) Keith Osgood	0+1	0	0	0	0	0	0	0	0	0
DF	(Wales) Mike England	33	0	1	0	1	0	12	2	47	2
DF	(Republic of Ireland) Joe Kinnear	3+4	0	0	0	0	0	2	0	5+4	0
Midfielders
MF	(England) Ralph Coates	36	3	0	0	1	0	10	4	47	7
MF	(England) Phil Holder	5+2	1	0	0	0	0	0+4	0	5+6	1
MF	(England) Steve Perryman	39	1	1	0	1	0	12	0	53	1
MF	(England) Martin Peters	35	6	1	0	1	0	12	8	49	14
MF	(England) John Pratt	35	4	1	0	1	0	12	0	49	4
MF	(England) Jimmy Neighbour	11+3	0	1	0	0	0	3+1	1	15+4	1
MF	(England) Neil McNab	0+1	0	0	0	0	0	0	0	0	0
MF	(Scotland) Chris McGrath	22+3	5	0	0	0	0	7+1	5	29+4	10
Forwards
FW	(England) Martin Chivers	39+1	17	1	0	1	0	11	6	52	23
FW	(Scotland) Alan Gilzean	21+4	3	1	0	1	0	3+1	2	26+5	5

== Notes ==
- Additional information added from the Official Tottenham Hotspur Handbook 2018–19.
