= 1972–73 Tottenham Hotspur F.C. season =

English football club season

Tottenham Hotspur
1972–73 season
- Chairman: Sidney Wale
- Manager: Bill Nicholson
- Stadium: White Hart Lane
- First Division: 8th
- FA Cup: 5th Round
- League Cup: Winners
- UEFA Cup: Semi-finals
- Top goalscorer: League: Martin Chivers (17); All: Martin Chivers (33)

The 1972–73 saw Tottenham compete in the Football League First Division, the FA Cup the League Cup and the UEFA Cup.

== Season summary ==
In the league Tottenham finished in 8th place. In FA Cup the club entered the competition in the third round with an away game against Margate which Tottenham won 6–0. In round four Tottenham were drawn against Derby County, with the first game being a draw it required a reply which went to White Hart Lane. In the match Derby came back from 3–1 down to win the match on 5–3 knocking Tottenham out of the competition. This season saw Tottenham win the League Cup for the second time in their history. They entered the competition in the second round and made it all the way to the final to face Norwich City. In the final Ralph Coates came off the bench to score the only goal in the game to win the trophy. This also allowed Tottenham to qualify to play in the 1973–74 UEFA Cup competition. In the UEFA Cup they reached the semi-finals where they faced Liverpool over the two legs, the first game Liverpool won 1-0 and the second game Tottenham won 2–1, leaving a scoreline of 2–2 aggregate. However Tottenham were knocked out on the away-goals rule and Liverpool went on the win the competition.

== Squad ==
Note: Flags indicate national team as defined under FIFA eligibility rules; some limited exceptions apply. Players may hold more than one non-FIFA nationality.

Pos.	Nation	Player
GK	NIR	Pat Jennings
GK	ENG	Barry Daines
DF	ENG	Ray Evans
DF	ENG	Cyril Knowles
DF	ENG	Phil Beal
DF	WAL	Mike England
DF	ENG	Tony Want
DF	ENG	Terry Naylor
DF	IRL	Joe Kinnear
DF	ENG	Peter Collins
MF	ENG	Phil Holder

Pos.	Nation	Player
MF	ENG	Steve Perryman
MF	ENG	Ralph Coates
MF	ENG	Alan Mullery
MF	ENG	Roger Morgan
MF	ENG	Jimmy Neighbour
MF	ENG	Martin Peters
MF	ENG	Jimmy Pearce
MF	ENG	John Pratt
FW	ENG	Martin Chivers
FW	SCO	Alan Gilzean
FW	ENG	Ray Clarke

== Preseason and friendlies ==
Before the season started Tottenham played three away games against Bournemouth, Aston Villa and Scottish club Celtic. Also during the season Spurs played a testimonial match against Dutch side Feyenoord, in honour of Jimmy Greaves which was played at Wembley.

29 July 1972 Friendly	Bournemouth	2–4	Tottenham Hotspur	Bournemouth
				Stadium: Dean Court

2 August 1972 Friendly	Aston Villa	0–0	Tottenham Hotspur	Aston, Birmingham
				Stadium: Villa Park

7 August 1972 Friendly	Celtic	1–0	Tottenham Hotspur	Glasgow, Scotland
				Stadium: Celtic Park

17 October 1972 Testimonial	Tottenham Hotspur	2–1	Feyenoord	Wembley, London
				Stadium: Wembley

== Competitions ==
=== First Division ===
Pos	Team	Pld	W	D	L	GF	GA	GAv	Pts	Qualification or relegation
6	West Ham United	42	17	12	13	67	53	1.264	46	Qualification for the Watney Cup (Note: West Ham United and Stoke City qualified for the Watney Cup as the two teams with the most goals that hadn't already qualified for a European competition.)
7	Derby County	42	19	8	15	56	54	1.037	46	
8	Tottenham Hotspur	42	16	13	13	58	48	1.208	45	Qualification for the UEFA Cup first round
9	Newcastle United	42	16	13	13	60	51	1.176	45	
10	Birmingham City	42	15	12	15	53	54	0.981	42	

Source: World Football
Rules for classification: 1) Points; 2) Goal average; 3) Goals scored

==== Matches ====
12 August 1972 1	Tottenham Hotspur	2–1	Coventry City	Tottenham, London
				Stadium: White Hart Lane

16 August 1972 2	West Bromwich Albion	0–1	Tottenham Hotspur	West Bromwich, West Midlands
				Stadium: The Hawthorns

19 August 1972 3	Wolverhampton Wanderers	3–2	Tottenham Hotspur	Wolverhampton, West Midlands
				Stadium: Molineux Stadium

23 August 1972 4	Tottenham Hotspur	2–0	Birmingham	Tottenham, London
				Stadium: White Hart Lane

26 August 1972 5	Tottenham Hotspur	0–0	Leeds United	Tottenham, London
				Stadium: White Hart Lane

30 August 1972 6	Newcastle United	0–1	Tottenham Hotspur	Newcastle upon Tyne
				Stadium: St James' Park

2 September 1972 7	Ipswich Town	1–1	Tottenham Hotspur	Ipswich, Suffolk
				Stadium: Portman Road

9 September 1972 8	Tottenham Hotspur	2–1	Crystal Palace	Tottenham, London
				Stadium: White Hart Lane

16 September 1972 9	Manchester City	2–1	Tottenham Hotspur	Manchester, England
				Stadium: Maine Road

23 September 1972 10	Tottenham Hotspur	1–0	West Ham United	Tottenham, London
				Stadium: White Hart Lane

30 September 1972 11	Derby County	2–1	Tottenham Hotspur	Derby, England
				Stadium: Baseball Ground

7 October 1972 12	Tottenham Hotspur	4–3	Stoke City	Tottenham, London
				Stadium: White Hart Lane

14 October 1972 13	Norwich City	2–1	Tottenham Hotspur	Norwich, Norfolk
				Stadium: Carrow Road

21 October 1972 14	Tottenham Hotspur	0–1	Chelsea	Tottenham, London
				Stadium: White Hart Lane

28 October 1972 15	Manchester United	1–4	Tottenham Hotspur	Manchester
				Stadium: Old Trafford

4 November 1972 16	Birmingham	0–0	Tottenham Hotspur	Birmingham, England
				Stadium: St Andrew's

11 November 1972 17	Tottenham Hotspur	1–1	West Bromwich Albion	Tottenham, London
				Stadium: White Hart Lane

18 November 1972 18	Leicester City	0–1	Tottenham Hotspur	Leicester, England
				Stadium: Filbert Street

25 November 1972 19	Tottenham Hotspur	1–2	Liverpool	Tottenham, London
				Stadium: White Hart Lane

2 December 1972 20	Southampton	1–1	Tottenham Hotspur	Southampton, Hampshire
				Stadium: The Dell

9 December 1972 21	Tottenham Hotspur	1–2	Arsenal	Tottenham, London
				Stadium: White Hart Lane

16 December 1972 22	Everton	3–1	Tottenham Hotspur	Liverpool, England
				Stadium: Goodison Park

23 December 1972 23	Tottenham Hotspur	2–0	Sheffield United	Tottenham, London
				Stadium: White Hart Lane

26 December 1972 24	West Ham United	2–2	Tottenham Hotspur	Upton Park, London
				Stadium: Boleyn Ground

6 January 1973 25	Leeds United	2–1	Tottenham Hotspur	Leeds, West Yorkshire
				Stadium: Elland Road

20 January 1973 26	Tottenham Hotspur	0–1	Ipswich Town	Tottenham, London
				Stadium: White Hart Lane

27 January 1973 27	Crystal Palace	0–0	Tottenham Hotspur	Selhurst, London
				Stadium: Selhurst Park

10 February 1973 28	Tottenham Hotspur	2–3	Manchester City	Tottenham, London
				Stadium: White Hart Lane

17 February 1973 29	Coventry City	0–1	Tottenham Hotspur	Birmingham
				Stadium: St Andrew's

24 February 1973 30	Tottenham Hotspur	3–0	Everton	Tottenham, London
				Stadium: White Hart Lane

10 March 1973 31	Tottenham Hotspur	3–0	Norwich City	Tottenham, London
				Stadium: White Hart Lane

14 March 1973 32	Stoke City	1–1	Tottenham Hotspur	Stoke-on-Trent
				Stadium: Victoria Ground

24 March 1973 33	Tottenham Hotspur	1–1	Manchester United	Tottenham, London
				Stadium: White Hart Lane

31 March 1973 34	Liverpool	1–1	Tottenham Hotspur	Liverpool
				Stadium: Anfield

3 April 1973 35	Chelsea	0–1	Tottenham Hotspur	Fulham, London
				Stadium: Stamford Bridge

7 April 1973 36	Tottenham Hotspur	1–2	Southampton	Tottenham, London
				Stadium: White Hart Lane

14 April 1973 37	Arsenal	1–1	Tottenham Hotspur	Highbury, London
				Stadium: Highbury

18 April 1973 38	Tottenham Hotspur	1–0	Derby County	Tottenham, London
				Stadium: White Hart Lane

21 April 1973 39	Tottenham Hotspur	1–1	Leicester City	Tottenham, London
				Stadium: White Hart Lane

28 April 1973 40	Tottenham Hotspur	3–2	Newcastle United	Tottenham, London
				Stadium: White Hart Lane

30 April 1973 41	Tottenham Hotspur	2–2	Wolverhampton Wanderers	Tottenham, London
				Stadium: White Hart Lane

2 May 1973 42	Sheffield United	3–2	Tottenham Hotspur	Sheffield, South Yorkshire
				Stadium: Bramall Lane

=== FA Cup ===
13 January 1973 R3	Margate	0–6	Tottenham Hotspur	Margate, England
		Report	Chivers 25', 49'; Pearce 55'; Peters 76'; Knowles 84'; Pratt 88'	Stadium: Hartsdown Park; Attendance: 8,500

3 February 1973 R4	Derby County	1–1	Tottenham Hotspur	Derby, England
	Davies	Report	Chivers	Stadium: Baseball Ground; Attendance: 37,895

7 February 1973 R4 - Reply	Tottenham Hotspur	3–5	Derby County	Tottenham, England
Tottenham Hotspur	Chivers; Gilzean; England (pen.)	Report	Davies; Hector	Stadium: White Hart Lane; Attendance: 52,736

=== League Cup ===
6 September 1972 R2	Tottenham Hotspur	2–1	Huddersfield Town	London, England
	Chivers; Gilzean	Report	Pugh	Stadium: White Hart Lane; Attendance: 21,422

3 October 1972 R3	Middlesbrough	1–1	Tottenham Hotspur	Middlesbrough
	Hickton	Report	Pearce	Stadium: Ayresome Park; Referee: 23,822

11 October 1972 R3 Reply (1)	Tottenham Hotspur	0–0	Middlesbrough	Tottenham, London
		Report		Stadium: White Hart Lane; Attendance: 19,256

30 October 1972 R3 Reply (2)	Tottenham Hotspur	2–1 (a.e.t.)	Middlesbrough	Tottenham, London
	Peters; Gilzean	Report	Hickton (pen.)	Stadium: White Hart Lane; Attendance: 19,287

1 November 1972 R4	Tottenham Hotspur	2–0	Millwall	Tottenham, London
	Peters; Perryman	Report		Stadium: White Hart Lane; Attendance: 28,904

4 December 1972 R5	Liverpool	1–1	Tottenham Hotspur	Liverpool
	Hughes	Report	Peters	Stadium: Anfield; Attendance: 48,677

6 December 1972 R5 - replay	Tottenham Hotspur	3–1	Liverpool	Tottenham, London
	Chivers; Pratt	Report	Callaghan	Stadium: White Hart Lane; Attendance: 34,565

20 December 1972 SF (first leg)	Wolverhampton Wanderers	1–2	Tottenham Hotspur	Wolverhampton, West Midlands
		Report	Peters; Pratt	Stadium: Molineux Stadium; Attendance: 28,357

30 December 1972 SF (second leg)	Tottenham Hotspur	2–2 (4–3 agg.)	Wolverhampton Wanderers	Tottenham, London
	Chivers; Peters	Report		Stadium: White Hart Lane; Attendance: 41,653

3 March 1973 Final	Tottenham Hotspur	1–0	Norwich City	London, England
15:30	Coates 72'	Report		Stadium: Wembley Stadium; Attendance: 100,000; Referee: David Smith

=== UEFA Cup ===
13 September 1972 R1 (first leg)	Lyn (Norway)	3–6	(England) Tottenham Hotspur	Oslo, Norwary
19:00	Austnes 7'; Christophersen 39', 57'	Report	Peters 8'; Pratt 24'; Gilzean 37', 38'; Chivers 82', 83'	Stadium: Ullevaal Stadion; Attendance: 10,770

27 September 1972 R1 (second leg)	Tottenham Hotspur (England)	6–0 (12–3 agg.)	(Norway) Lyn	Tottenham, London
20:30	Chivers 20', 31', 70'; Coates 52', 83'; Pearce 57'	Report		Stadium: White Hart Lane; Attendance: 21,109

25 October 1972 R2 (first leg)	Tottenham Hotspur (England)	4–0	(Greece) Olympiacos	Tottenham, London
20:30	Pearce 11', 58'; Chivers 35'; Coates 48'	Report		Stadium: White Hart Lane; Attendance: 27,815

8 November 1972 R2 (second leg)	Olympiacos (Greece)	1–0 (1–4 agg.)	(England) Tottenham Hotspur	Piraeus, Greece
13:00	Arguroidis 44'	Report		Stadium: Stadio Georgios Karaiskakis; Attendance: 35,000

29 November 1972 R3 (first leg)	Tottenham Hotspur (England)	2–0	(Socialist Federal Republic of Yugoslavia) Red Star Belgrade	Tottenham, London
19:30	Chivers 26'; Gilzean 63'	Report		Stadium: White Hart Lane; Attendance: 23,958

13 December 1972 R3 (Second leg)	Red Star Belgrade (Socialist Federal Republic of Yugoslavia)	1–0 (1–2 agg.)	(England) Tottenham Hotspur	Belgrade
15:00	Lazarević 48'	Report		Stadium: Stadion Rajko Mitić; Attendance: 70,000

7 March 1973 QF (first leg)	Tottenham Hotspur (England)	1–0	(Portugal) Vitória de Setúbal	Tottenham, London
19:30	Evans 80'	Report		Stadium: White Hart Lane; Attendance: 30,469

21 March 1973 QF (second leg)	Vitória de Setúbal (Portugal)	2–1 (2–2 agg.)	(England) Tottenham Hotspur	Setubal, Portugal
23:00	Henrique Campora 20'; Torres 65'	Report	Chivers 68'	Stadium: Estádio do Bonfim; Attendance: 30,000

Tottenham won on away goal rules

10 April 1973 SF (first leg)	Liverpool (England)	1–0	(England) Tottenham Hotspur	Liverpool, England
20:30	Lindsay 26'	Report		Stadium: Anfield; Attendance: 42,174; Referee: Bertil Lööw (Sweden)

25 April 1973 SF (second leg)	Tottenham Hotspur (England)	2–1 (2–2 agg.)	(England) Liverpool	Tottenham, England
20:30	Peters 42', 62'	Report	Heighway 54'	Stadium: White Hart Lane; Attendance: 46,919; Referee: Aurelio Angonese (Italy)

2–2 on aggregate; Liverpool won on away goals.

== Appearances ==
Sources: League and FA Cup statistics, Europe, UEFA.com; League Cup, 11v11.com

Pos.	Name	First Division		FA Cup		League Cup		Europe		Total	
Pos.	Name	Apps	Goals	Apps	Goals	Apps	Goals	Apps	Goals	Apps	Goals
Goalkeepers
GK	(England) Barry Daines	2	0	0	0	0	0	0	0	2	0
GK	(England) Terry Lee	0	0	0	0	0	0	0	0	0	0
GK	(Northern Ireland) Pat Jennings	40	0	3	0	10	0	10	0	63	0
Defenders
DF	(England) Phil Beal	24	0	2	0	3	0	6	0	35	0
DF	(England) Mike Dillon	8	0	0	0	1	0	1	0	10	0
DF	(England) Ray Evans	24+1	0	2	0	6	0	7+1	1	39+2	1
DF	(England) Cyril Knowles	35	0	3	1	10	0	10	0	58	1
DF	(England) Terry Naylor	16+2	0	1	0	7+1	0	3+3	0	27+6	0
DF	(England) Keith Osgood	0	0	0	0	0	0	0	0	0	0
DF	(Wales) Mike England	31	1	3	1	10	0	10	0	54	2
DF	(Republic of Ireland) Joe Kinnear	24	1	1	0	4	0	6	0	35	1
DF	(England) Peter Collins	7	2	0	0	0	0	0	0	7	2
Midfielders
MF	(England) Ralph Coates	32+3	2	3	0	4+2	1	7	3	46+5	6
MF	(England) Phil Holder	0	0	0	0	0	0	0+1	0	0+1	0
MF	(England) Steve Perryman	41	2	3	0	10	1	10	0	64	3
MF	(England) Martin Peters	41	15	3	1	8	4	8	3	60	23
MF	(England) John Pratt	38+1	5	3	1	10	3	7	1	58+1	10
MF	(England) Jimmy Neighbour	7+1	1	0	0	0+1	0	0+1	0	7+3	1
MF	(England) Neil McNab	0	0	0	0	0	0	0	0	0	0
MF	(Scotland) Chris McGrath	0	0	0	0	0	0	0	0	0	0
MF	(England) Jimmy Pearce	35+8	4	0+2	1	9+1	1	8+2	3	52+13	9
Forwards
FW	(England) Martin Chivers	38	17	3	4	10	4	10	8	61	33
FW	(Scotland) Alan Gilzean	35	5	3	1	8+1	2	7+2	3	52+3	11
FW	(England) Ray Clarke	1+1	0	0	0	0	0	0	0	1+1	0

== Notes ==
- Attendance data compiled from: Tottenham Hotspur Official handbook season 2018–2019.
