= 1971–72 Tottenham Hotspur F.C. season =

English football club season

Tottenham Hotspur
1971–72 season
- Chairman: Sidney Wale
- Manager: Bill Nicholson
- Stadium: White Hart Lane
- First Division: 6th
- FA Cup: 6th Round
- League Cup: Semi-finals
- UEFA Cup: Winners
- Top goalscorer: Martin Chivers (25)

The 1971–72 season saw Tottenham Hotspur compete in the First Division where they finished 6th in the table. It was also the season where they won the UEFA Cup for the first time beating Wolverhampton Wanderers in an all English final over two legs. In the FA Cup they reach the sixth round where they went away to Leeds United at Elland Road to lose 2–1. In the League Cup they reached the Semi–final where they were knocked out by Chelsea.

== Squad ==
Note: Flags indicate national team as defined under FIFA eligibility rules; some limited exceptions apply. Players may hold more than one non-FIFA nationality.

Pos.	Nation	Player
GK	NIR	Pat Jennings
GK	ENG	Barry Daines
DF	ENG	Ray Evans
DF	ENG	Cyril Knowles
DF	ENG	Phil Beal
DF	WAL	Mike England
DF	ENG	Tony Want
DF	ENG	Terry Naylor
DF	IRL	Joe Kinnear
DF	ENG	Peter Collins
MF	ENG	Phil Holder

Pos.	Nation	Player
MF	ENG	Steve Perryman
MF	ENG	Ralph Coates
MF	ENG	Alan Mullery
MF	ENG	Roger Morgan
MF	ENG	Jimmy Neighbour
MF	ENG	Martin Peters
MF	ENG	Jimmy Pearce
MF	ENG	John Pratt
FW	ENG	Martin Chivers
FW	SCO	Alan Gilzean

== Transfers ==
=== Out ===
Date from	Position	Nationality	Name	To	Fee	Ref.
May 1971	FB	(Wales)	John Collins	Portsmouth	£5,000	

== Competitions ==
=== First Division ===
Pos	Team	Pld	W	D	L	GF	GA	GAv	Pts	Qualification or relegation
4	Manchester City	42	23	11	8	77	45	1.711	57	Qualification for the UEFA Cup first round
5	Arsenal	42	22	8	12	58	40	1.450	52	
6	Tottenham Hotspur	42	19	13	10	63	42	1.500	51	Qualification for the UEFA Cup first round (Note: Tottenham Hotspur qualified for the UEFA Cup as the 1971-72 UEFA Cup winners.)
7	Chelsea	42	18	12	12	58	49	1.184	48	
8	Manchester United	42	19	10	13	69	61	1.131	48	

Source: World Football
Rules for classification: 1) Points; 2) Goal average; 3) Goals scored

=== League Cup ===
8 September 1971 Second round	West Bromwich Albion	0–1	Tottenham Hotspur	West Bromwich, West Midlands
			Pearce	Stadium: The Hawthorns; Attendance: 26,203

6 October 1971 Third round	Torquay United	1–4	Tottenham Hotspur	Torquay, Devon
			Pearce; Chivers; Peters pen'	Stadium: Plainmoor; Attendance: 20,100

27 October 1971 Fourth round	Tottenham Hotspur	1–1	Preston North End	Tottenham, London
	Chivers			Stadium: White Hart Lane; Attendance: 30,338

8 November 1971 Fourth round replay	Preston North End	1–2 (a.e.t.)	Tottenham Hotspur	Preston
			Perryman; Chivers	Stadium: Deepdale; Attendance: 30,338

17 November 1971 Fifth round	Tottenham Hotspur	2–0	Blackpool	Tottenham, London
	Chivers; Peters			Stadium: White Hart Lane; Attendance: 30,099

22 December 1971 Semi-finals first leg	Chelsea	3–2	Tottenham Hotspur	Fulham, London
			Naylor; Chivers	Stadium: Stamford Bridge; Attendance: 43,330

5 January 1972 Semi-finals second leg	Tottenham Hotspur	2–2	Chelsea	Tottenham, London
	Chivers; Peters pen'			Stadium: White Hart Lane; Attendance: 52,755

=== FA Cup ===
15 January 1972 Third round	Tottenham Hotspur	1–1	Carlisle United	Tottenham, London
	Gilzean	Report		Stadium: White Hart Lane; Attendance: 33,702

18 January 1972 Third round replay	Carlisle United	1–3	Tottenham Hotspur	Carlisle, Cumbria
		Report	Gilzean; Chivers	Stadium: Brunton Park; Attendance: 21,560

5 February 1972 Fourth round	Tottenham Hotspur	2–0	Rotherham United	Tottenham, London
	Gilzean; Peters	Report		Stadium: White Hart Lane; Attendance: 36,903

26 February 1972 Fifth round	Everton	0–2	Tottenham Hotspur	Liverpool
		Report	Gilzean 10'; Peters 72'	Stadium: Goodison Park; Attendance: 50,511

18 March 1972 Quarter finals	Leeds United	2–1	Tottenham Hotspur	Leeds
	Clarke; Charlton	Report	Pratt	Stadium: Elland Road; Attendance: 43,937

=== UEFA Cup ===
14 September 1971 First round	Keflavík	1–6	Tottenham Hotspur	Keflavík, Iceland
				Stadium: Keflavíkurvöllur; Attendance: 11,000

28 September 1971 First round	Tottenham Hotspur	9–0	Keflavík	Tottenham, London
				Stadium: White Hart Lane; Attendance: 23,818

20 October 1971 Second round	Nantes	0–0	Tottenham Hotspur	Nantes, France
				Stadium: Stade Marcel Saupin; Attendance: 20,033

2 November 1971 Second round	Tottenham Hotspur	1–0	Nantes	Tottenham, London
				Stadium: White Hart Lane; Attendance: 32,630

8 December 1971 Third round	Tottenham Hotspur	3–0	Rapid Bucharest	Tottenham, London
				Stadium: White Hart Lane; Attendance: 30,702

15 December 1971 Third round	Rapid Bucharest	0-2	Tottenham Hotspur	Bucharest, Romania
				Stadium: Giulești-Valentin Stănescu; Attendance: 12,000

7 March 1972 Fourth round	UT Arad	0–2	Tottenham Hotspur	Arad, Romania
		Report	England; Morgan	Stadium: Stadionul Francisc von Neuman; Attendance: 20,000

21 March 1972 Fourth round	Tottenham Hotspur	1–1	UT Arad	Tottenham, London
		Report		Stadium: White Hart Lane; Attendance: 30,253

5 April 1972 Semi-final	Tottenham Hotspur	2–1	AC Milan	Tottenham, London
				Stadium: White Hart Lane; Attendance: 42,064

19 April 1972 Semi-final	AC Milan	1–1	Tottenham Hotspur	Milan, Italy
				Stadium: San Siro; Attendance: 68,482

3 May 1972 Finals	Wolverhampton Wanderers	1–2	Tottenham Hotspur	Wolverhampton, West Midlands
	McCalliog	Report	Chivers	Stadium: Molineux; Attendance: 38,362

17 May 1972 Finals	Tottenham Hotspur	1–1	Wolverhampton Wanderers	Tottenham, London
	Mullery	Report	David Wagstaffe	Stadium: White Hart Lane; Attendance: 54,303
