= Joe Kinnear =

Irish football manager and player (1946–2024)

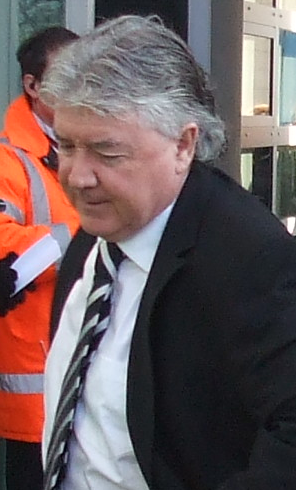
- Kinnear in 2009

Personal information
- Full name: Joseph Patrick Kinnear
- Date of birth: 27 December 1946
- Place of birth: Dublin, Ireland
- Date of death: 7 April 2024 (aged 77)
- Place of death: Mill Hill, London, England
- Position: Defender

Youth career
- 1964–1965: St Albans City

Senior career*
Years	Team	Apps	(Gls)
1965–1975	Tottenham Hotspur	196	(2)
1975–1976	Brighton & Hove Albion	16	(1)
Total		212	(3)

International career
1967–1975	Republic of Ireland	26	(0)

Managerial career
- 1983: Al-Shabab (assistant manager)
- 1984: India
- 1987: Nepal
- 1989: Doncaster Rovers (caretaker)
- 1992–1999: Wimbledon
- 2001–2003: Luton Town
- 2004: Nottingham Forest
- 2008–2009: Newcastle United
- 2013–2014: Newcastle United (Director of Football)
- * Club domestic league appearances and goals

Joseph Patrick Kinnear (27 December 1946 – 7 April 2024) was an Irish professional football manager and player. As a defender, Kinnear spent the majority of his career spanning ten seasons with Tottenham Hotspur and one with Brighton & Hove Albion. With Tottenham he won the FA Cup, the League Cup twice, the Charity Shield, and the UEFA Cup. After Spurs, Kinnear played for Brighton for the 1975–76 season. Having been born in Dublin, Kinnear played and was capped 26 times for the Republic of Ireland national team. After his playing career, he managed India, Nepal, Doncaster Rovers, Wimbledon, Luton Town, Nottingham Forest, and Newcastle United.

== Early life ==
Kinnear moved to England at the age of eight. His father died when Kinnear was young and his mother brought up five children on a council estate in Watford. Kinnear captained his school and the Hertfordshire team and was noticed by St Albans City.

== Club career ==
Kinnear made an impression as a player with St Albans City. His talent as a defender was recognised and, in 1963, aged 17, he moved to Tottenham Hotspur as an amateur footballer. Learning his footballing skills under the managership of Bill Nicholson, Kinnear made his Tottenham debut on 8 April 1966 in a 4–1 home defeat by West Ham United. Kinnear had just played his first international game and three days later, in February 1967, Phil Beal broke his arm, which put him out of the rest of the season. This allowed Kinnear to play more regular football for Tottenham in the right back position and, by the end of the season, he went on to play in the 1967 FA Cup final, beating Chelsea, a game Tottenham won 2–1. Kinnear made almost 200 league appearances for Tottenham, scoring two league goals. He won four major honours during his time at the club: the FA Cup in 1967; the UEFA Cup in 1972 and the Football League Cup on two occasions (in 1971 and 1973). In 1975, he moved to Brighton, where he made 16 appearances before retiring aged 30.

== International career ==
Kinnear was capped 26 times by the Republic of Ireland, scoring no goals. His debut came in the 2–1 defeat by Turkey on 22 February 1967.

== Managerial career ==
=== Asia ===
After his retirement from football in 1977, Kinnear spent five years in Sharjah in the United Arab Emirates managing Sharjah and Al-Shabab (alongside Dave Mackay), also spending time coaching in Malaysia. He spent three months coaching India and one year coaching Nepal, later returning to England to assist Mackay at Doncaster Rovers.

=== Wimbledon ===
Kinnear briefly took charge of Doncaster after Mackay's departure in 1989, but was replaced by Billy Bremner after a consortium completed their takeover of the club. Kinnear was appointed reserve team manager of Wimbledon later that year before being appointed manager at the club following Peter Withe's dismissal in January 1992. Kinnear led the Dons to a 6th-place finish in the Premier League in the 1993–94 season. He was voted Premier League Manager of the Month three times by the end of the season as Wimbledon finished above more established teams including Liverpool, Aston Villa, Everton and Tottenham Hotspur.

The next season Kinnear continued to defy the odds and Wimbledon finished 9th in the league.

It was reported that Kinnear turned down the chance to replace Jack Charlton as manager of the Republic of Ireland national team in 1996 because the FAI did not offer him enough money. Kinnear then guided Wimbledon to semi-finals in both of the major domestic cup competitions in 1997 as well as finishing 8th in the Premier League. When Wimbledon were taken over by new Norwegian owners after the end of that season, it was widely reported that Kinnear would be axed as manager in favour of Norwegian coach Åge Hareide, but no change happened and Kinnear remained as manager for a further two seasons.

Kinnear continued in his role as Wimbledon until he suffered a heart attack before a league game against Sheffield Wednesday in March 1999. He stood down in June of that year and was replaced at Wimbledon by Egil Olsen. Wimbledon were relegated from the Premier League the following season.

=== Luton Town ===
Before returning to football management with Luton Town, Kinnear was a front runner to replace Martin O'Neill at Leicester City, and also considered taking over the struggling Sheffield Wednesday. Instead, Kinnear would be briefly involved as director of football at Oxford United during the 2000–01 season. In January 2001, he resigned, reportedly because of poor health. Kinnear's lack of input at Oxford was seen as the real reason behind his move away. Just a few weeks later he was handed a similar role at Luton Town, who were battling against relegation from what was then the Second Division, as were Oxford. On arrival, Kinnear demoted then-manager Lil Fuccillo and appointed himself manager of the team.

He could not save the club from relegation, despite purchasing striker Steve Howard for £50,000 on transfer deadline day. In the summer of 2001, Kinnear released the majority of the relegated squad, and brought in a number of his own men over the course of the season, including future captains Kevin Nicholls and Chris Coyne, along with winger Jean-Louis Valois. The team stormed to promotion under Kinnear's guidance, finishing runners-up to Plymouth Argyle in the Hatters' first promotion in 20 years.

The next season was disappointing for the Hatters, as they were expected to compete for promotion, but in the end they only managed a 9th-place finish. In May 2003 the club was sold to a consortium, led by John Gurney, which led to Kinnear and his assistant Mick Harford being sacked in mysterious circumstances, citing a Northampton Town employee's signature on the letters which confirmed the dismissal.

=== Nottingham Forest ===
Kinnear was out of work until Nottingham Forest offered him the manager's job in February 2004, taking over from Paul Hart. Forest were in the bottom third of the league table when he took over, but he would have an immediate impact on the club. Kinnear was able to get the club up to 14th position by the end of the 2003–04 season. The following season began with talk of promotion, but would go badly for Forest and Kinnear, with just four wins from the first 23 games in the league that year. A 3–0 defeat by rivals Derby County at Pride Park, signalled the end for Kinnear, with his resignation coming on 16 December 2004. Nottingham Forest were 22nd in the Championship table following Kinnear's departure, the club appointed Mick Harford to take over as interim manager. Forest would ultimately be relegated at the end of the season, after Gary Megson had been appointed as the full-time replacement to Kinnear.

=== Newcastle United (2008–09) ===
Kinnear was without a club following his departure from Nottingham Forest for almost four years and had not been involved in the top flight since 1999, there were rumours about joining several clubs during this time including QPR. On 26 September 2008, Kinnear was named as the interim manager of Premier League side Newcastle United until the end of October, following the shock resignation of Kevin Keegan who had publicly berated the owners and directors of the club, suggesting corruption and lack of clarity over who was in charge of the squad. The initial one-month period was extended for an additional month, keeping Kinnear at St James' Park until the end of December.

On 2 October 2008, Kinnear launched a verbal tirade at the Daily Mirror journalist Simon Bird, calling him a "cunt". Kinnear swore over 50 times in the first five minutes of the interview. The club's press officer tried to order the assembled journalists not to publish any extracts from the tirade, but Kinnear himself gave the journalists permission to write up whatever they wanted from his remarks. Later in the interview, he announced that he would no longer deal with the national media while he was Newcastle manager, and that he would only speak to local newspapers from then on, with first team coach Chris Hughton handling all other interviews. Following the rant, Kinnear was nicknamed 'JFK' as in Joe 'Fucking' Kinnear.

Kinnear's first two games in charge, against Everton and Manchester City, both ended as 2–2 draws. Kinnear's first win at Newcastle was against West Bromwich Albion. Newcastle won the match 2–1, with the first goal coming from Joey Barton, who was making his first starting appearance for Newcastle since being released from prison during the summer. He then followed this up with a surprise win against fifth-placed Aston Villa to lift Newcastle off the foot of the table and out of the relegation zone. Two goals from Obafemi Martins secured the 2–0 victory.

On 31 October 2008, Kinnear stated that 22 November would be "D–Day" with regards to the sale of Newcastle United and his position as manager. This turned out to be untrue, as Kinnear was confirmed as being in charge for another month after Newcastle's 0–0 draw with Chelsea. On 28 November, Kinnear was named as the permanent manager of Newcastle until the end of the 2008–09 season.

Kinnear continued his event-filled season in charge by getting sent off on 6 December after a confrontation with referee Mike Riley during a 2–2 draw with Stoke City, having been up by two goals for most of the match. After that disappointing draw with Stoke, they followed with wins against Portsmouth and Tottenham Hotspur, which was Newcastle's fifth consecutive league victory against the North London team.

Following a 5–1 defeat by Liverpool on 28 December, Kinnear re-affirmed his belief that the Newcastle squad lacked strength in depth – with the manager having fielded a makeshift side due to injuries and suspensions resulting from the 2–1 Boxing Day defeat by Wigan Athletic – and stated that he was looking to improve the side with transfers in the January window. In January, Kinnear secured the signings of Peter Løvenkrands, Kevin Nolan and Ryan Taylor. The latter had been signed in a part exchanged deal with Charles N'Zogbia. N'Zogbia had frequently stated in the press, via his agent, that he wished to leave after Kinnear mispronounced his name during an interview in which he called him "insomnia". He also stated that he would not consider a return to Newcastle as long as Kinnear was the manager. Shay Given was also sold to Manchester City for £7m.

On 7 February 2009, Kinnear was taken to hospital after feeling ill, hours before Newcastle's away game against West Brom. The club stated that it was just precautionary and that Chris Hughton would take charge of the team. Newcastle won 3–2, their first win since Christmas. It was later announced Kinnear would require a heart bypass operation and that Alan Shearer would take over the managerial role for the remainder of the season. Kinnear's contract officially expired at Newcastle on 30 May 2009.

=== Director of Football at Newcastle United (2013–2014) ===
On 16 June 2013, in a series of telephone interviews Kinnear claimed he had been appointed as director of football for Newcastle United. In a Talksport interview over the telephone on 17 June 2013, Kinnear stated he had replaced "Derek Lambesi" (mispronouncing the name of Derek Llambias) as the club's director of football, had signed Dean Holdsworth at Wimbledon for £50,000 (actually £650,000), sold Robbie Earle (who retired a year after Kinnear left), signed goalkeeper Tim Krul when he was previously manager (Krul was actually signed by Graeme Souness three years prior) and had been awarded the LMA Manager of the Year award three times despite only winning the award once. He also incorrectly stated he had never been previously sacked. Kinnear claimed to have signed John Hartson on a free when he in fact paid £7.5 million for the striker. He also mispronounced the names of Yohan Cabaye, Hatem Ben Arfa, Shola Ameobi and others in the Talksport interview.

The appointment of Kinnear, on a three-year contract, was confirmed by Newcastle United on 18 June. The confusion around Kinnear's appointment to the role was criticised by former club chairman Freddy Shepherd in an interview with BBC Sport. Kinnear drew criticism when the 2013 summer transfer window closed with Kinnear failing to make a single permanent signing, lone recruit Loïc Rémy having been signed on loan from Queens Park Rangers. This criticism intensified at the end of the 2014 winter transfer window with Kinnear failing again to make a permanent signing, this after the £20 million sale of midfielder Yohan Cabaye, with Luuk de Jong having been brought in on loan from Borussia Mönchengladbach.

On 3 February 2014, Kinnear resigned from his position of director of football at Newcastle.

== Personal life and death ==
In 2021, it was announced that since 2015 Kinnear had been living with vascular dementia. He died from complications of the disease on 7 April 2024, at the age of 77. After his death, his family donated his brain to a study researching a possible link between dementia and having a career in professional football. It was confirmed that Kinnear had chronic traumatic encephalopathy which had led to his dementia and eventual death.

== Career statistics ==
Appearances and goals by club, season and competition
Club	Season	League			FA Cup		League Cup		Europe		Total	
Club	Season	Division	Apps	Goals	Apps	Goals	Apps	Goals	Apps	Goals	Apps	Goals
Tottenham Hotspur	1965–66	First Division	8	0								
Tottenham Hotspur	1966–67	First Division	20	0								
Tottenham Hotspur	1967–68	First Division	31	1								
Tottenham Hotspur	1968–69	First Division	24	0								
Tottenham Hotspur	1969–70	First Division	9	0								
Tottenham Hotspur	1970–71	First Division	35	0								
Tottenham Hotspur	1971–72	First Division	21	0								
Tottenham Hotspur	1972–73	First Division	24	1								
Tottenham Hotspur	1973–74	First Division	7	0								
Tottenham Hotspur	1974–75	First Division	17	0								
Tottenham Hotspur	Total		196	2	24	0	20	0	18	0	258	2
Brighton & Hove Albion	1975–76	Third Division	16	1								
Career total			212	3								

== Managerial statistics ==
Managerial record by team and tenure
Team	From	To	Record				
Team	From	To	P	W	D	L	Win %
India	1983	1984	13	4	0	9	30.8
Nepal	1987	1987	11	6	3	2	54.5
Doncaster Rovers	March 1989	June 1989	11	1	3	7	9.1
Wimbledon	19 January 1992	30 May 1999	364	130	109	125	35.7
Luton Town	8 February 2001	23 May 2003	122	56	28	38	45.9
Nottingham Forest	10 February 2004	16 December 2004	44	15	15	14	34.1
Newcastle United	26 September 2008	7 February 2009	18	4	8	6	22.2
Total			583	216	166	201	37.0

== Honours ==
=== Player ===
Tottenham Hotspur

- FA Cup: 1966–67
- Football League Cup: 1970–71, 1972–73
- FA Charity Shield: 1967 (shared)
- UEFA Cup: 1971–72

=== Manager ===
Nepal

- South Asian Games runner-up: 1987

Luton Town

- Football League Third Division runner-up: 2001–02

Individual

- LMA Manager of the Year: 1994
- Premier League Manager of the Month: September 1993, March 1994, April 1994, September 1996

== Bibliography ==
- Goodwin, Bob (1992). The Spurs Alphabet. ACL & Polar Publishing (UK). ISBN 0-9514862-8-4.
