= Terry Lee (footballer) =

English footballer

Personal information
- Full name: Terence William George Lee
- Date of birth: 20 September 1952
- Place of birth: Stepney, England
- Date of death: 22 June 1996 (aged 43)
- Place of death: Torbay, England
- Position: Goalkeeper

Senior career*
Years	Team	Apps	(Gls)
1970–1975	Tottenham Hotspur	1	(0)
1975–1978	Torquay United	106	(0)
1978	Newport County	1	(0)
- Minehead
- * Club domestic league appearances and goals

Terence William George Lee (20 September 1952 – 22 June 1996) was an English professional footballer who played for Tottenham Hotspur, Torquay United, Newport County and Minehead.

== Playing career ==
Lee emigrated as a child to New Zealand. He started his career as an inside forward and represented North Island against South Island. On his return to the UK he played for Havering and Mid Essex schools before signing as an apprentice with Tottenham Hotspur in April 1968. The club converted him to a goalkeeper and together with teammates including Steve Perryman, Ray Evans and Jimmy Neighbour lifted the London FA Youth Cup. He signed professional forms in May 1970. Lee was a third string goalkeeper behind Pat Jennings and Barry Daines and was limited to one senior appearance against Newcastle United– a 2–0 win for the "Lilies" at St James' Park. In July 1975 he transferred to Torquay United where he featured in 106 matches between 1975 and 1978. Lee signed for Newport County in November 1978, a cartilage injury restricted him to one senior fixture. He went on to play for Minehead where he ended his football career.

== Post–football career ==
At the end of his competitive career, he trained as a chef and settled in Devon. The keen cricketer suffered a fatal heart attack while playing for the Barton Cricket club 2nd XI against Exeter in Torbay on 22 June 1996.
