= 2007 Vodacom Challenge =

2007 friendly soccer tournament

The 2007 Vodacom Challenge was a friendly soccer tournament played in South Africa between 21 July and 28 July 2007, and contested by South African clubs Kaizer Chiefs and Orlando Pirates, and English club Tottenham Hotspur.

== First round ==
21 July 2007

Kaizer Chiefs (South Africa)	1–2	(England) Tottenham Hotspur
Bartlett 50'		Keane 40'; Berbatov 61'

ABSA Stadium, Durban

24 July 2007

Orlando Pirates (South Africa)	1–2	(England) Tottenham Hotspur
Kamwendo 87' (pen.)		Bent 12'; Routledge 84'

Newlands Stadium, Cape Town

== Third place match ==
26 July 2007

Kaizer Chiefs (South Africa)	0–1	(South Africa) Orlando Pirates
		Chenene 57'

EPRU Stadium, Port Elizabeth

== Final ==
28 July 2007

Orlando Pirates (South Africa)	0–3	(England) Tottenham Hotspur
		Bent 11', 22'; Berbatov 18'

Loftus Versfeld, Pretoria
