= Keith Osgood =

English footballer

Personal information
- Date of birth: 8 May 1955 (age 71)
- Place of birth: Isleworth, England
- Position: Central defender

Senior career*
Years	Team	Apps	(Gls)
1972–1977	Tottenham Hotspur	113	(13)
1978–1979	Coventry City	24	(1)
1979–1981	Derby County	69	(10)
1981–1983	Leyton Orient	36	(0)
1984	HJK	10	(2)
1984–1985	Cambridge United	35	(1)

International career
1970	England Schoolboys	1	(0)
1973	England Youth	3	(0)
- * Club domestic league appearances and goals

Keith Osgood (born 8 May 1955) is an English former professional footballer who played for Tottenham Hotspur, Coventry City, Derby County, Leyton Orient, HJK and Cambridge and represented the England team at youth and schoolboy level.

== Football career ==
Osgood joined Tottenham as an apprentice in May 1972. The solid central defender played 127 matches for the club, including one as substitute, and scored on 14 occasions between 1973 and 1977. Thirteen of his Spurs goals came in the League, of which 10 were penalties; the other was scored in a 4–0 home win against Wimbledon in the 2nd round of the League Cup in season 1977–78, once again from the penalty spot.

Osgood was a member of the team that was relegated at the end of season 1976–1977, the beginning of the Keith Burkinshaw managerial era. In January 1978, he transferred to Coventry City in a £130,000 deal, going on to make 24 appearances for the club and scoring a solitary goal. He moved to Derby County in October 1979, where he featured in 69 games and netted 10 goals between 1979 and 1981. Osgood left the Baseball Ground in December 1981, transferring to Leyton Orient, for whom he made another 36 appearances. During the summer of 1984, Osgood had a spell with Helsingin Jalkapalloklubi in Finland. He finished his senior career at Cambridge United, playing on 35 occasions and finding the net only once.
