= Martin Chivers =

English footballer (1945–2026)

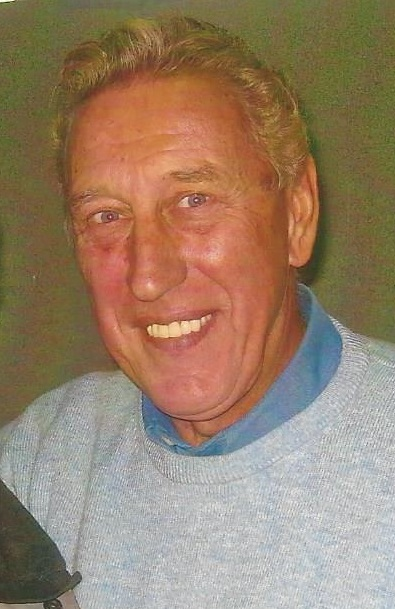
- Chivers in 2011

Personal information
- Full name: Martin Harcourt Chivers
- Date of birth: 27 April 1945
- Place of birth: Southampton, England
- Date of death: 7 January 2026 (aged 80)
- Height: 6 ft 1 in (1.85 m)
- Position: Forward

Youth career
- 1961–1962: CPC Sports

Senior career*
Years	Team	Apps	(Gls)
1962–1968	Southampton	175	(96)
1968–1976	Tottenham Hotspur	278	(118)
1976–1978	Servette	66	(33)
1978–1979	Norwich City	11	(4)
1979–1980	Brighton & Hove Albion	5	(1)
1980	Dorchester Town	5	(3)
1980	→ Frankston City (loan)	2	(0)
1981–1982	Vard Haugesund	2	(0)
1982–1983	Barnet	10	(0)
Total		546	(255)

International career
1964–1968	England U23	17	(7)
1971–1973	England	24	(13)
- * Club domestic league appearances and goals

Martin Harcourt Chivers (27 April 1945 – 7 January 2026) was an English professional footballer who played as a forward. He began his career with his hometown club Southampton where he had a successful six years and in 1968 was bought by Tottenham Hotspur for a club and league record sum of £125,000. With Spurs he went on to win the Football League Cup twice and the UEFA Cup in the 1971–72 season.

At the age of 31 Chivers moved to Swiss club Servette and there too won silverware: firstly the Coppa delle Alpi, then the Swiss League Cup in 1977 and finally the Swiss Cup in 1977–78. Returning to England in 1978, Chivers had spells with Norwich City and Brighton & Hove Albion, and finished his playing career with Barnet.

From 1971 to 1973, he played for the England national team, scoring thirteen goals in 24 appearances, but did not represent his country at a major tournament.

== Club career ==
=== Southampton ===
Chivers attended Taunton's Grammar School, Southampton, and wrote to his local club, Southampton for a trial. He spent a brief period in the club's nursery side, CPC Sports, and signed as a professional footballer in September 1962, making his debut against Charlton Athletic on 8 September 1962 (aged 17). His first goal came in a 4–1 defeat by Newcastle United on 6 April 1963 in his third first-team appearance. This goal means that his name is also in the record books as the first substitute to score for the Saints.

In the 1963–64 season, Chivers became a regular starter and was the club's joint leading goalscorer (with Terry Paine) with 21 goals, as Southampton finished a disappointing fifth in the Second Division. The following season, he was again a virtual ever-present, making 39 appearances with 17 goals as the Saints improved to fourth place.

In the 1965–66 season, Chivers played an integral role as the club finally gained promotion to the top flight (as runners-up), scoring 30 goals from 39 games, generally from crosses provided by Terry Paine and John Sydenham. All his goals were scored from the first 29 games, and he failed to find the net after the end of February.

Once in the First Division, Chivers played second fiddle to the Welsh striker, Ron Davies, scoring 14 and 13 goals respectively in the next two seasons. Chivers became unsettled at The Dell and was soon being chased by many of the top clubs. Saints' manager Ted Bates was prepared to allow Chivers to leave, as he had a more than adequate replacement coming up through the ranks in Mick Channon. He scored a total of 106 goals in 190 appearances for the Saints.

=== Tottenham Hotspur ===
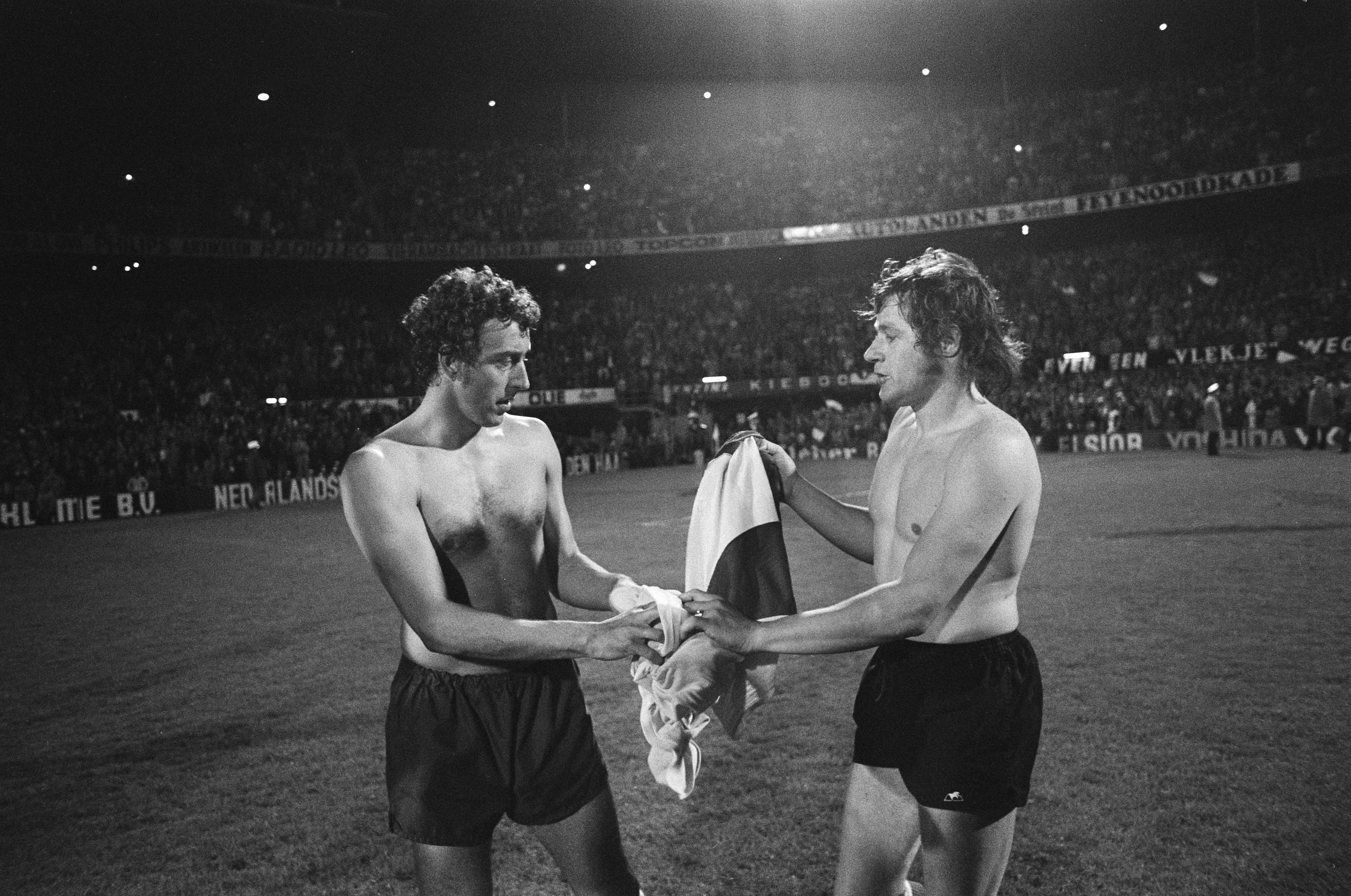
Chivers swapping shirts with Feyenoord's Rinus Israël after the second leg match of the 1974 UEFA Cup final

In January 1968, Tottenham Hotspur manager Bill Nicholson signed Chivers for a club record fee of £125,000, which also made him the country's most expensive player at that time. The deal involved 24-year-old Frank Saul moving from White Hart Lane to The Dell. Chivers scored on his Spurs debut against Sheffield Wednesday in January 1968.

Chivers was often seen as a lethargic and lazy player, but his pace and natural strength established "Big Chiv" as a star of the Spurs side throughout the early 1970s. The 1970–71 season was the beginning of Chivers's golden years. He played in all 58 competitive games that season and scored 34 times, including both goals in the League Cup final against Aston Villa, and 21 goals in the First Division as Spurs finished the season in third place.

During the 1971–72 campaign, Chivers hit the best form of his career, netting 42 times in 62 first team appearances. His seven goals in as many League Cup ties enabled Spurs to reach the semi-finals of the competition where they eventually lost to London neighbours Chelsea. The resurgent striker saved his most impressive form for the UEFA Cup, scoring eight times in 11 matches, including a hat-trick in a 9–0 demolition of Icelandic side Keflavik ÍF, and a superb double against Wolverhampton Wanderers in a memorable final. In the First Division, he surpassed his tally of the previous campaign, scoring 25 times in 39 appearances.

Chivers continued his prolific form in the 1972–73 season, finding the net 33 times in 61 appearances. His acclaimed goalscoring ability again guided Tottenham to League Cup success with two quarter-final strikes against Liverpool, and a crucial goal at Molineux where the Londoners drew 2–2 to reach the final. His European form was equally impressive, producing eight goals in ten matches, as Spurs reached the UEFA Cup semi-finals before losing to Liverpool on the away goals rule.

Spurs again reached the final of the UEFA Cup in 1974 with Chivers scoring six goals, including in a 2–0 home victory against East German side Lokomotive Leipzig. The two-legged final was to end in disappointment with Dutch giants Feyenoord winning 4–2 on aggregate as Spurs lost a major final for the first time. By the beginning of the 1974–75 season, Chivers was considered to be the senior forward at Tottenham, playing alongside Chris Jones, Chris McGrath and Scotsman John Duncan. In early September, he played his last game for the legendary Bill Nicholson, as Middlesbrough crushed Spurs 4–0 in the second round of the League Cup. Injuries restricted Chivers to just 28 league appearances in which he scored 10 goals, including important strikes against West Ham United, Leeds United and local rivals Arsenal.

The 1975–76 season was Chivers's last at White Hart Lane as he struggled to find the net in a relatively poor Spurs team. He made 37 appearances in all competitions, scoring nine times, before joining Swiss club Servette for an £80,000 fee. In his eight and a half-year Spurs career, Chivers scored a total of 174 goals in 367 first-team appearances and remained the leading Tottenham goalscorer in European competition for 39 years until he was overtaken by Jermain Defoe on 7 November 2013.

=== Later career ===
At the age of 31 in July 1976, the prolific striker moved to Servette in Switzerland, before returning to English league football with spells at Norwich City (1978–79) and Brighton & Hove Albion (1979–80), where he finished his professional career. In the early 1980s, he continued his career in non-league football with Dorchester Town and Barnet, and played abroad for Australian club Frankston City and Norwegian club Vard Haugesund.

== International career ==
On 8 April 1964, Chivers made his debut for the England under-23 team against France, coming on as a substitute and scoring a goal in a 2–3 loss. He remained a fixture of the under-23 squad for the next four years and scored seven goals in 17 appearances.

On 3 February 1971, Chivers made his debut for England against Malta. On 21 April, he scored his first goal in his second cap, in a 3–0 win over Greece.

In October 1973, Chivers won the last of his full England caps against Poland in an infamous World Cup qualifier. Despite scoring six international goals in the calendar year, the Spurs striker was a casualty of his country's failure to qualify for the tournament and would later be ignored by caretaker manager Joe Mercer and future boss Don Revie. He was capped 24 times for England, scoring 13 goals.

== Later life and death ==
After retiring from professional football he bought and owned The Brookmans Park hotel from 1981 to 1999 in Brookmans Park, Hertfordshire. Chivers also commentated for BBC Radio and remained a popular matchday host at White Hart Lane.

In April 2007, he was inducted into the Tottenham Hotspur Hall of Fame. In May 2008, he was appointed the National Development Manager to the Football Association. Chivers's autobiography, Big Chiv – My Goals in Life, was released in October 2009.

Chivers died on 7 January 2026, at the age of 80.

== Career statistics ==
Appearances and goals by national team and year
National team	Year	Apps	Goals
England	1971	8	7
England	1972	5	0
England	1973	11	6
Total		24	13

Scores and results list England's goal tally first, score column indicates score after each Chivers goal.

List of international goals scored by Martin Chivers
No.	Date	Venue	Opponent	Score	Result	Competition
1	21 April 1971	Wembley Stadium, London, England	Greece	1–0	3–0	UEFA Euro 1972 qualification
2	12 May 1971	Wembley Stadium, London, England	Malta	1–0	5–0	UEFA Euro 1972 qualification
3	12 May 1971	Wembley Stadium, London, England	Malta	4–0	5–0	UEFA Euro 1972 qualification
4	22 May 1971	Wembley Stadium, London, England	Scotland	2–1	3–1	British Home Championship
5	22 May 1971	Wembley Stadium, London, England	Scotland	3–1	3–1	British Home Championship
6	13 October 1971	St. Jakob-Park, Basel, Switzerland	Switzerland	1–0	3–2	UEFA Euro 1972 qualification
7	1 December 1971	Karaiskakis Stadium, Piraeus, Greece	Greece	2–0	2–0	UEFA Euro 1972 qualification
8	14 February 1973	Hampden Park, Glasgow, Scotland	Scotland	4–0	5–0	British Home Championship
9	12 May 1973	Windsor Park, Belfast, Northern Ireland	Northern Ireland	1–0	2–1	British Home Championship
10	12 May 1973	Windsor Park, Belfast, Northern Ireland	Northern Ireland	2–1	2–1	British Home Championship
11	15 May 1973	Wembley Stadium, London, England	Wales	1–0	3–0	British Home Championship
12	10 June 1973	Central Lenin Stadium, Moscow, Russia	Soviet Union	1–0	2–1	Friendly match
13	26 September 1973	Wembley Stadium, London, England	Austria	5–0	7–0	Friendly match

== Honours ==
Southampton

- Football League Second Division second-place promotion: 1965–66

Tottenham Hotspur

- Football League Cup: 1970–71, 1972–73
- UEFA Cup: 1971–72
- Anglo-Italian League Cup: 1971

Servette

- Swiss Cup: 1977–78
- Swiss League Cup: 1976–77
- Coppa delle Alpi: 1975–76

Individual

- Rothmans Golden Boots Awards: 1971, 1972
- Swiss League Best Foreign Player: 1977–78

== Bibliography ==
- Holley, Duncan; Chalk, Gary (2003). In That Number – A post-war chronicle of Southampton FC. Hagiology Publishing. ISBN 0-9534474-3-X.
