= Steve Perryman =

English footballer (born 1951)

Steve Perryman MBE
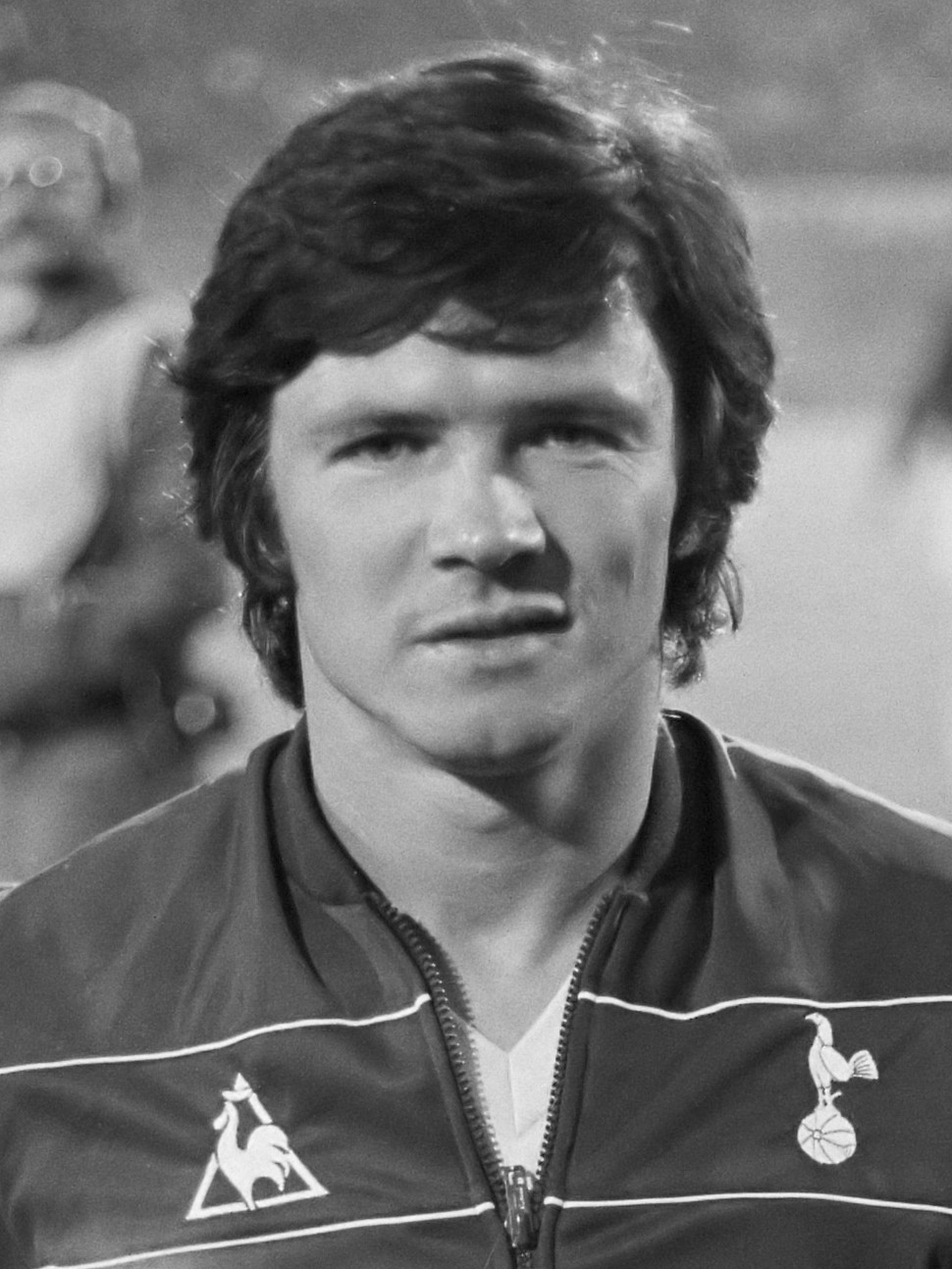
- Perryman with Tottenham Hotspur in 1981

Personal information
- Full name: Stephen John Perryman
- Date of birth: 21 December 1951 (age 74)
- Place of birth: Ealing, Middlesex, England
- Height: 1.76 m (5 ft 9 in)
- Positions: Defender; midfielder

Team information
- Current team: Milton Keynes Dons (Associate Director)

Senior career*
Years	Team	Apps	(Gls)
1969–1986	Tottenham Hotspur	655	(31)
1986–1987	Oxford United	17	(0)
1987–1990	Brentford	53	(0)
Total		725	(31)

International career
1967	England Schoolboys	6	(1)
1970	England Youth	4	(1)
1972–1975	England U23	17	(0)
1982	England	1	(0)

Managerial career
- 1987–1990: Brentford
- 1990–1993: Watford
- 1994: Tottenham Hotspur (caretaker)
- 1995: Start
- 1999–2000: Shimizu S-Pulse
- 2001–2002: Kashiwa Reysol
- * Club domestic league appearances and goals

Stephen John Perryman MBE (born 21 December 1951) is an English former professional footballer who played as a defender or midfielder.

He is best-known for his successes with Tottenham Hotspur during the 1970s and early 1980s. He has won the FA Cup, League Cup, and UEFA Cup all twice with Tottenham in his 17 years at the club. Perryman was voted Football Writers' Association Footballer of the Year in 1982 and made a club record 854 first team appearances for Tottenham.

When he retired, he had made over 1,000 career appearances.

He was the director of football at Exeter City from 2003 until his temporary retirement in March 2018.

== Playing career ==
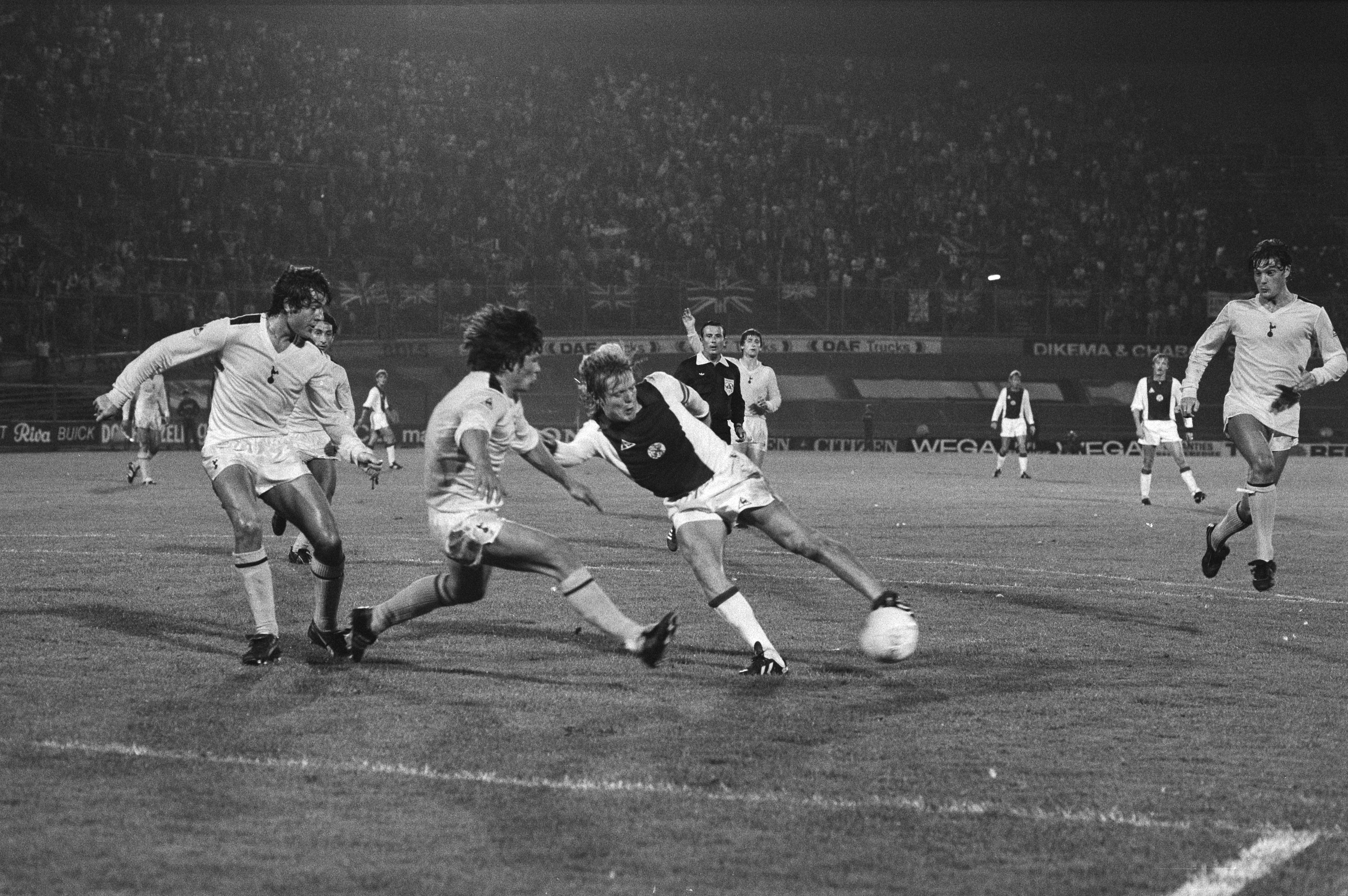
Steve Perryman attempting to intercept in a match against Ajax, Cup Winners' Cup first round in 1981

Perryman was born in Ealing, Middlesex. A midfielder and later defender, he played in a club record 866 first team appearances in all competitions for Tottenham Hotspur between 1969 and 1986 and was their longest serving player. During his seventeen-year career with the north London club, Perryman collected many medals, winning the UEFA Cup in 1972 and 1984 (playing in both legs of the 1972 final and just the first leg of the 1984 final as he was suspended for the second), and the League Cup in 1971 and 1973. He followed in the footsteps of Joe Harvey and Danny Blanchflower and skippered Tottenham to successive FA Cup wins in 1981 and 1982. Perryman was also voted the Football Writers' Association Footballer of the Year in 1982.

Perryman did not score often even by the standards of contemporary midfielders, however he scored both goals in a 2–1 home win over AC Milan in the 1972 UEFA Cup semi-final first leg. Spurs went on to win the round 3–2 on aggregate, and then won the title, defeating Wolverhampton Wanderers in the final.

After leaving White Hart Lane Perryman moved to Oxford United in March 1986, but was cup-tied for their victory in the 1986 Football League Cup final. He then played for Brentford as player-manager in the same year, before retiring in 1990.

== Coaching career ==
Perryman became manager of Watford from 1990 to 1993, saving them from relegation in the early years, then returned to Tottenham Hotspur as assistant manager to Osvaldo Ardiles in 1993. He also served as caretaker manager for Spurs in November 1994. Perryman then managed Start in Norway (1995), Shimizu S-Pulse (1999–2000) and Kashiwa Reysol in Japan (2001–2002). As a coach, he has won the J.League stage championship (1999 2nd Stage) and the Asian Cup Winners Cup (2000), both with Shimizu S-Pulse. He then worked at Exeter City with no official title to help them stay in the then football Division 3. After this he returned to Japan to manage J.League side Kashiwa Reysol.

Perryman lent his name to a brand of Sports stores in the 1980s which were concentrated in the West London area and sported the Tottenham Hotspur cockerel. There were stores in Uxbridge, Ruislip, Greenford, Hayes and Hayes Town (Middlesex). A store in Bergen, Norway, also opened in the early 1980s, which is still operating.

Between 2003 and 2018, Perryman was director of football for Exeter City. On 5 May 2012, while watching Exeter's final game of the 2011–12 season against Sheffield United at St James Park he became unwell and was taken to Derriford Hospital in Plymouth where he underwent successful heart surgery. A month later he revealed that he might have died if it had not been for the instant medical support available at the ground, and he spent three weeks in a coma on life support.

In January 2018, Perryman announced that he would retire as Exeter City's director of football at the end of the 2017–18 season. However, in August of that year, Perryman joined former Exeter City manager Paul Tisdale at MK Dons, becoming an associate director of the club until November 2019 when Tisdale left.

== International career ==
After 17 matches for England U23, Perryman made a solitary appearance for England, appearing as a 70th-minute substitute against Iceland on 2 June 1982. The game was originally an England B fixture but was subsequently upgraded to full international status meaning Perryman was awarded his cap.

== Personal life ==
Perryman has been married twice, with four children. He is close friends with Ossie Ardiles. He lives in Kington St Michael. Perryman has previously said he is a Labour Party supporter.

He was appointed Member of the Order of the British Empire (MBE) in the 1986 Birthday Honours, "for services to association football".

== Career statistics ==
=== Club ===
Appearances and goals by club, season and competition
Club	Season	League			FA Cup		League Cup		Europe (Note: Includes UEFA Cup and UEFA Cup Winners' Cup (1981–82 and 1982–83).)		Other (Note: Includes appearances in Texaco Cup (3 in 1970–71), Anglo-Italian League Cup (2 in 1971), Charity Shield (1981, 1982), ScreenSport Super Cup (5 in 1985–86) and Football League Trophy (Associate Members' Cup) (3 in 1987–88, 1 in 1988–89 and 1 in 1989–90).)		Total	
Club	Season	Division	Apps	Goals	Apps	Goals	Apps	Goals	Apps	Goals	Apps	Goals	Apps	Goals
Tottenham Hotspur	1969–70	First Division	23	1	4	0	0	0	–		–		27	1
Tottenham Hotspur	1970–71	First Division	42	3	5	0	6	1	–		3	0	56	4
Tottenham Hotspur	1971–72	First Division	39	1	5	0	6	1	12	3	2	0	64	4
Tottenham Hotspur	1972–73	First Division	41	2	3	0	10	1	10	0	–		64	3
Tottenham Hotspur	1973–74	First Division	39	1	1	0	1	0	12	0	–		53	1
Tottenham Hotspur	1974–75	First Division	42	6	2	0	1	0	–		–		45	6
Tottenham Hotspur	1975–76	First Division	40	6	2	1	6	0	–		–		48	7
Tottenham Hotspur	1976–77	First Division	42	1	1	0	2	0	–		–		45	1
Tottenham Hotspur	1977–78	Second Division	42	1	2	0	2	0	–		–		46	1
Tottenham Hotspur	1978–79	First Division	42	1	7	1	2	0	–		–		51	2
Tottenham Hotspur	1979–80	First Division	40	1	6	0	2	0	–		–		48	1
Tottenham Hotspur	1980–81	First Division	42	2	9	0	6	0	–		–		57	2
Tottenham Hotspur	1981–82	First Division	42	1	7	0	8	0	8	0	1	0	66	1
Tottenham Hotspur	1982–83	First Division	33	1	3	0	2	0	3	0	1	0	42	1
Tottenham Hotspur	1983–84	First Division	41	1	4	0	3	0	11	0	–		59	1
Tottenham Hotspur	1984–85	First Division	42	1	3	0	5	0	8	0	–		58	1
Tottenham Hotspur	1985–86	First Division	23	1	5	1	4	0	–		5	0	37	2
Tottenham Hotspur	Total		655	31	69	2	66	3	64	3	12	0	866	39
Oxford United	1985–86	First Division	9	0	0	0	0	0	–		0	0	9	0
Oxford United	1986–87	First Division	8	0	0	0	0	0	–		0	0	8	0
Oxford United	Total		17	0	0	0	0	0	—		0	0	17	0
Brentford	1986–87	Third Division	24	0	3	0	0	0	–		0	0	27	0
Brentford	1987–88	Third Division	21	0	1	0	2	0	–		3	0	27	0
Brentford	1988–89	Third Division	5	0	2	0	1	0	–		1	0	9	0
Brentford	1989–90	Third Division	3	0	0	0	0	0	–		1	0	4	0
Brentford	Total		53	0	7	0	3	0	—		5	0	68	0
Career total			725	31	76	2	69	3	64	3	17	0	951	39

== Managerial statistics ==
Team	From	To	Record					Ref
Team	From	To	G	W	D	L	Win %	Ref
Brentford	1 January 1987	15 August 1990	183	71	49	63	38.80	
Watford	27 November 1990	31 July 1993	132	44	37	51	33.33	
Tottenham Hotspur (caretaker)	1 November 1994	15 November 1994	1	0	0	1	0.00	
Shimizu S-Pulse	1999	2000	60	37	3	20	61.67	
Kashiwa Reysol	2001	2002	28	10	3	15	35.71	
Exeter City	7 October 1994	18 October 1994	2	0	2	0	0.00	
Total			406	162	94	150	39.90	

== Honours ==
=== Player ===
Tottenham Hotspur Youth

- FA Youth Cup: 1969–70

Tottenham Hotspur

- FA Cup: 1980–81, 1981–82
- Football League Cup: 1970–71, 1972–73; runner-up: 1981–82
- FA Charity Shield: 1981 (shared)
- UEFA Cup: 1971–72, 1983–84
- Anglo-Italian League Cup: 1971

Individual

- FWA Footballer of the Year: 1982

=== Manager ===
Shimizu S-Pulse

- J1 League: 1999 Second stage champions, runner-up Suntory Championship
- Asian Cup Winners' Cup: 1999–2000

Individual

- J. League Manager of the Year: 1999
