= Mike England =

Welsh retired football player and manager (born 1941)

Mike England MBE
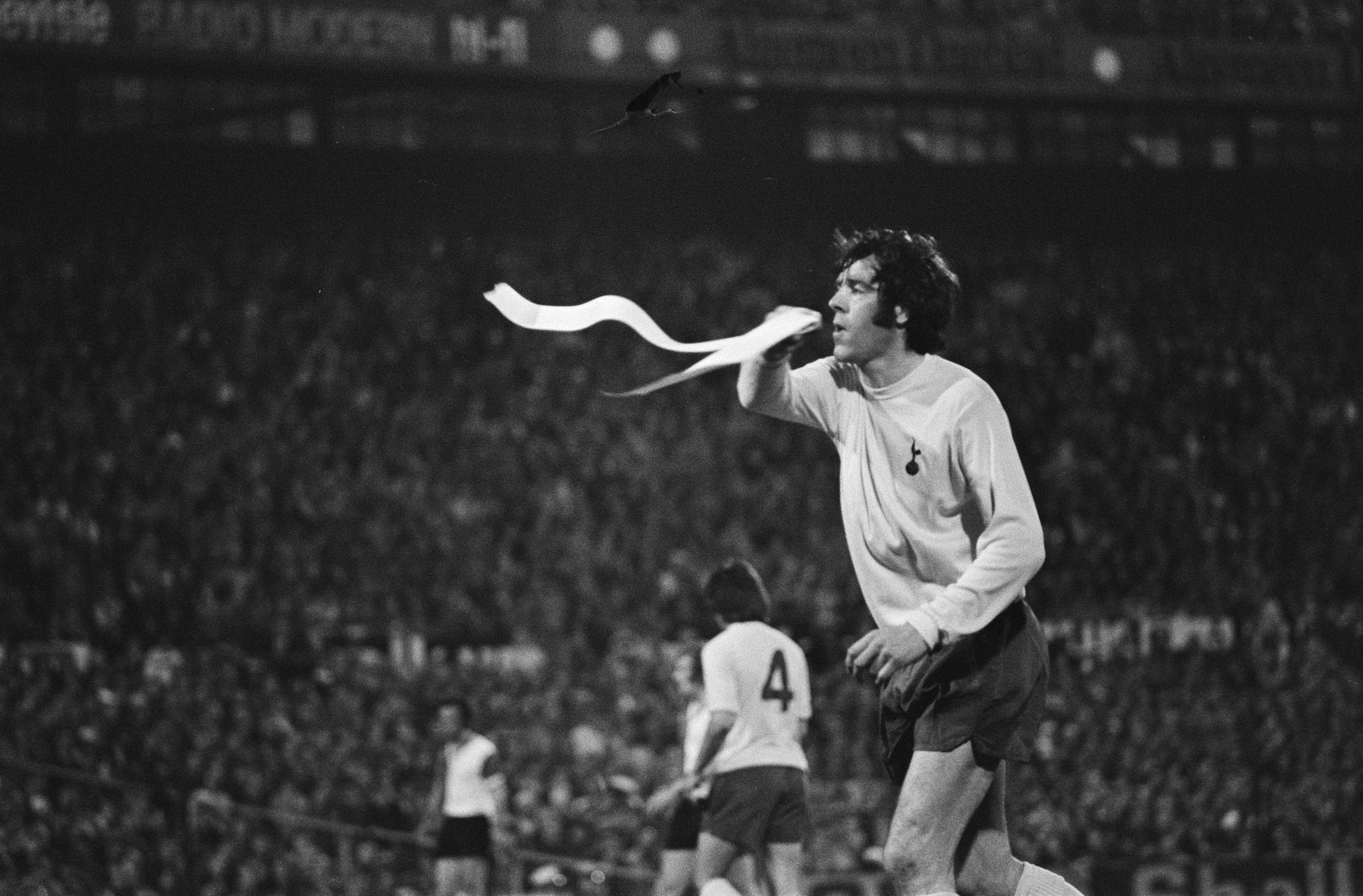
- England playing for Tottenham Hotspur in 1974

Personal information
- Full name: Harold Michael England
- Date of birth: 2 December 1941 (age 84)
- Place of birth: Holywell, Flintshire, Wales
- Height: 6 ft 2 in (1.88 m)
- Position: Defender

Senior career*
Years	Team	Apps	(Gls)
1959–1966	Blackburn Rovers	165	(21)
1966–1975	Tottenham Hotspur	300	(14)
1975–1979	Seattle Sounders	106	(6)
1975–1976	→ Cardiff City (loan)	40	(1)
1979–1980	Cleveland Force (indoor)	11	(0)
Total		622	(42)

International career
1962–1974	Wales	44	(4)

Managerial career
- 1980–1988: Wales
- * Club domestic league appearances and goals

Harold Michael England MBE (born 2 December 1941) is a Welsh retired football player and manager.

== Playing career ==
Playing as a central defender, England began his career at Blackburn Rovers in 1959, before moving to Tottenham Hotspur in July 1966, ultimately winning four major trophies: the FA Cup in 1967, the UEFA Cup in 1972, and the League Cup in 1971 and 1973.

In 1975, England signed for Seattle Sounders in the North American Soccer League. He made his debut in a 3-1 win over the Los Angeles Aztecs. Fellow Wales international Arfon Griffiths was a teammate at the Sounders. Both England and Griffiths were selected in the 1975 NASL All Stars.

He made 44 international appearances for Wales over twelve years, scoring 4 goals. He was the youngest ever Wales permanent captain for many years, until superseded by Aaron Ramsey in 2011.

== Management career ==
He later managed the Wales national team from March 1980 to February 1988. His reign as manager was marked by a series of frustrations, as a team of limited resources, but with talented players such as Neville Southall, Ian Rush, Mark Hughes and Mickey Thomas, very narrowly missed out on qualification to a series of major tournaments, including the 1982, and 1986 FIFA World Cups. Perhaps most agonisingly, Wales only missed out on qualification for the UEFA Euro 1984 by seconds when an injury-time winning goal by Ljubomir Radanović for Yugoslavia in the final game of qualifying group 4 against Bulgaria eliminated Wales.

England was sacked as Wales manager on 3 February 1988 after another initially promising attempt to qualify for UEFA Euro 1988 ended in failure. That was to be the final job he would ever have in football. He later managed a nursing home in North Wales, and then owned two nursing homes and ran his own timber business.

== Honours ==
Tottenham Hotspur

- FA Cup: 1966–67
- Football League Cup: 1972–73
- UEFA Cup: 1971–72

Individual

- Rothmans Golden Boots Awards: 1970
- NASL All-Stars: First-team: 1975, 1976, 1977, 1978
