= Terry Naylor =

English footballer

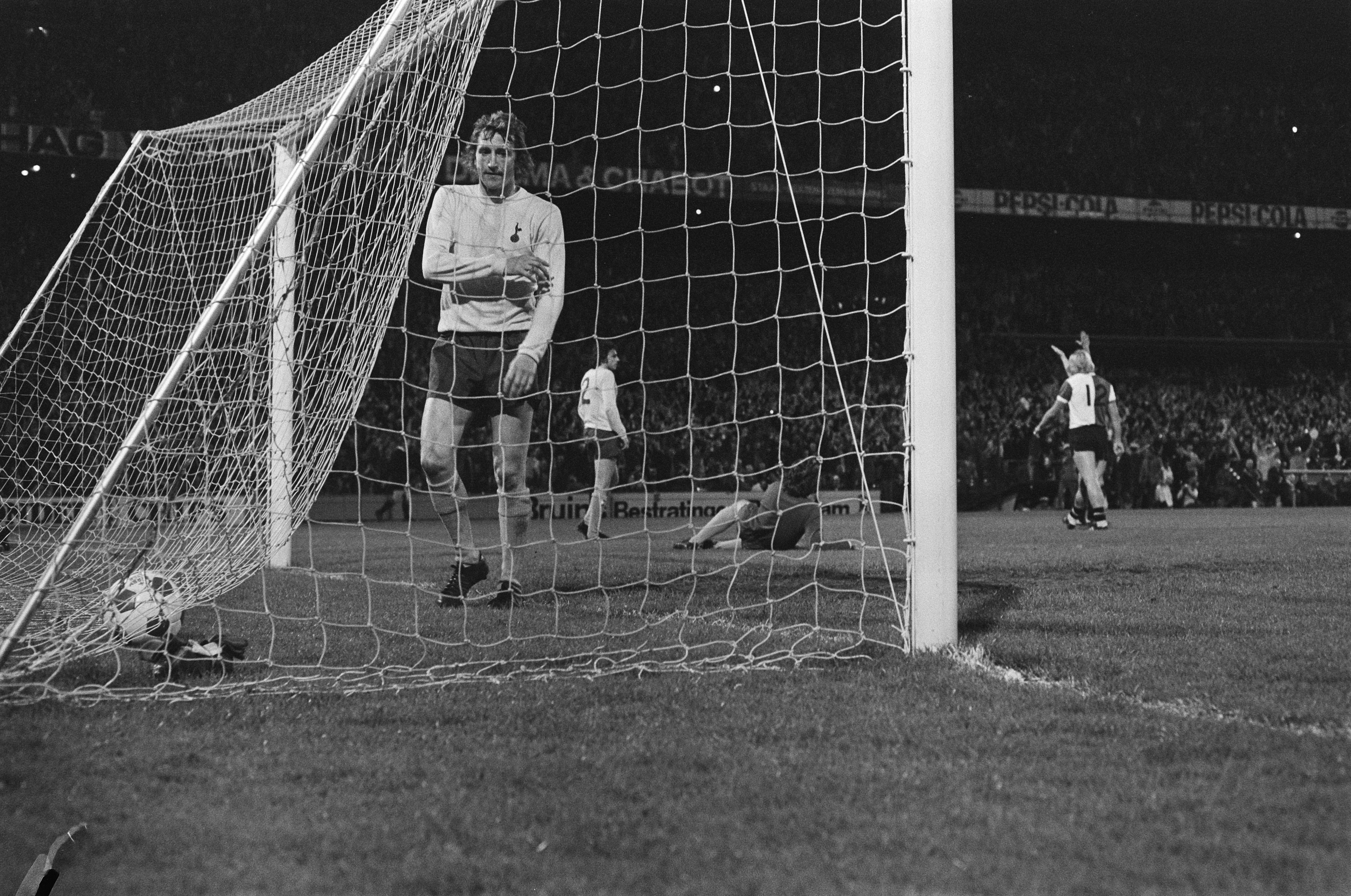
- Naylor (foreground) playing for Tottenham Hotspur in 1974

Personal information
- Full name: Terence Michael Patrick Naylor
- Date of birth: 5 December 1948 (age 77)
- Place of birth: Islington, London, England
- Position: Full-back

Senior career*
Years	Team	Apps	(Gls)
1969–1979	Tottenham Hotspur	243	(0)
1980–1983	Charlton Athletic	73	(0)
Total		316	(0)
- * Club domestic league appearances and goals

Terry Naylor (born 5 December 1948) is an English former professional footballer who played as full-back. He spent the majority of his career with Tottenham Hotspur, before playing for Charlton Athletic.

== Career ==
Naylor joined Tottenham Hotspur in July 1969. He was previously employed as a meat porter at London's Smithfield Market. His tough, uncompromising style of play as a full-back soon earned him the nickname of "Meathook" with the White Hart Lane faithful. He played a total of 243 games in all competitions for Spurs, including 14 as substitute. Naylor featured in both legs of the 1974 UEFA Cup final against Feyenoord and was an unused substitute in both legs of the 1972 UEFA Cup final against Wolverhampton Wanderers.

Naylor joined Charlton Athletic in November 1980 and went on to make 73 League appearances for the club.

== Post–football career ==
After his football career ended, Naylor was employed as a postman for Royal Mail. During the 1988–89 season, Naylor took charge of Tonbridge Angels for seven games.

He has since retired and still lives in the Islington area. In his spare time, Naylor sings in pubs in and around Hackney and Islington.

== Honours ==
Tottenham Hotspur

- UEFA Cup: 1971–72, 1973–74; runner-up
