= Barry Daines =

English footballer (1951–2026)

Personal information
- Full name: Barry Raymond Daines
- Date of birth: 30 September 1951
- Place of birth: Witham, England
- Date of death: 7 November 2026 (aged 75)
- Height: 5 ft 11 1/2 in (1.82 m)
- Position: Goalkeeper

Senior career*
Years	Team	Apps	(Gls)
1969–1981	Tottenham Hotspur	146	(0)
1981–1983	Bulova SA		
1983–1984	Mansfield Town	21	(0)
- Chelmsford City
- * Club domestic league appearances and goals

Barry Raymond Daines (30 September 1951 – 7 November 2026) was an English professional footballer. A goalkeeper, he played in the Football League for Tottenham Hotspur, Mansfield Town and for Bulova SA in Hong Kong. Daines also represented England at youth level.

== Career ==
Daines joined Tottenham Hotspur as an apprentice in September 1969. He made a total of 146 appearances between 1971 and 1981. Daines was substitute in both legs of the 1972 UEFA Cup Final. Throughout much of his time at Tottenham he was understudy to Pat Jennings, he did however play in all 42 league matches in the 1977–78 season. In 1981 Tottenham awarded Daines a testimonial. The game was played in May 1981 and resulted in West Ham United beating Tottenham Hotspur 3–2 at White Hart Lane.

He played in the Hong Kong First Division between 1981 and 1983 for Bulova SA before ending his professional career at Mansfield Town and making a further 21 appearances. Daines also appeared on the books at Chelmsford City, following his departure from Mansfield.

== Later life and death ==
Daines went on to become a supermarket manager in Essex.

Daines died on 7 November 2026, aged 75.
