= 1973–74 UEFA Cup =

3rd season of Europe's secondary club football tournament organised by UEFA

Tournament details
- Dates: 12 September 1973 – 29 May 1974
- Teams: 64

Final positions
- Champions: (Netherlands) Feyenoord (1st title)
- Runners-up: (England) Tottenham Hotspur

Tournament statistics
- Matches played: 126
- Goals scored: 401 (3.18 per match)
- Attendance: 2,373,731 (18,839 per match)
- Top scorer(s): Lex Schoenmaker (Feyenoord); 9 goals

The 1973–74 UEFA Cup was the third season of the UEFA Cup, the third-tier club football competition organised by UEFA. The final was played over two legs at White Hart Lane, London, England, and at De Kuip, Rotterdam, the Netherlands. It was won by Feyenoord of the Netherlands, who defeated Tottenham Hotspur of England by an aggregate result of 4–2 to claim their first UEFA Cup title.

This was the fifth consecutive year where a Dutch team won a European competition, and the first one outside of the European Cup. Feyenoord also broke a streak of six consecutive years of English clubs winning the UEFA Cup or the Inter-Cities Fairs Cup.

== Association team allocation ==
A total of 64 teams from 31 UEFA member associations participate in the 1973–74 UEFA Cup. The original allocation scheme was as follows:

- 3 associations have four teams qualify.
- 3 associations have three teams qualify.
- 18 associations have two teams qualify.
- 7 associations have one team qualify.

Northern Ireland returned to the competition after a one-year absence. Scotland and Belgium were the two associations selected to have an extra third berth for this season, while France, Yugoslavia and Portugal went back to two qualified teams.

Associations in the 1973–74 UEFA Cup

Four teams
England
Italy
West Germany
Three teams
Scotland
Spain
Belgium

Two teams
Hungary	Netherlands	Poland
Portugal	East Germany	Czechoslovakia
(Socialist Federal Republic of Yugoslavia) Yugoslavia	Soviet Union	Romania
Turkey	France	Greece
Austria	Bulgaria	Denmark
Switzerland	Sweden	Norway

One team
Northern Ireland
Malta
Finland
Luxembourg
Republic of Ireland
Iceland
Cyprus

Did not compete
Wales
Albania

Wales: No national league existed in Wales before 1992 and the only competition organised by the Football Association of Wales was the Welsh Cup so Wales had just a single participant in European competitions, the winner (or best placed Welsh team as several English teams also competed) of the Welsh Cup which competed in the UEFA Cup Winners' Cup.
Albania: Albanian teams were absent from European competition from 1973 to 1978 due to the international isolation of the country during the communist rule of Enver Hoxha. Besa would have qualified for the UEFA Cup by league position.

=== Teams ===
The labels in the parentheses show how each team qualified for competition:

- TH: Title holders
- CW: Cup winners
- CR: Cup runners-up
- LC: League Cup winners
- 2nd, 3rd, 4th, 5th, 6th, etc.: League position
- P-W: End-of-season European competition play-offs winners

Qualified teams for 1973–74 UEFA Cup
(England) Leeds United (3rd)	(England) Ipswich Town (4th)	(England) Wolverhampton Wanderers (5th)	(England) Tottenham Hotspur (LC)
(Italy) Lazio (3rd)	(Italy) Fiorentina (4th)	(Italy) Inter Milan (5th)	(Italy) Torino (6th)
(West Germany) Köln (2nd)	(West Germany) Fortuna Düsseldorf (3rd)	(West Germany) Wuppertaler SV (4th)	(West Germany) Stuttgart (6th)
(Scotland) Hibernian (3rd)	(Scotland) Aberdeen (4th)	(Scotland) Dundee (5th)	(Spain) Barcelona (2nd)
(Spain) Español (3rd)	(Spain) Real Madrid (4th)	(Belgium) Standard Liège (2nd)	(Belgium) Molenbeek (3rd)
(Belgium) Beerschot (4th)	(Hungary) Ferencváros (2nd)	(Hungary) Budapest Honvéd (4th)	(Netherlands) Feyenoord (2nd)
(Netherlands) Twente (3rd)	(Poland) Ruch Chorzów (2nd)	(Poland) Gwardia Warsaw (3rd)	(Portugal) Belenenses (2nd)
(Portugal) Vitória de Setúbal (3rd)	(East Germany) Carl Zeiss Jena (2nd)	(East Germany) Lokomotive Leipzig (3rd)	(Czechoslovakia) Tatran Prešov (2nd)
(Czechoslovakia) Košice (3rd)	(Socialist Federal Republic of Yugoslavia) Velež (2nd)	(Socialist Federal Republic of Yugoslavia) OFK Beograd (3rd)	(Soviet Union) Dynamo Kyiv (2nd)
(Soviet Union) Dinamo Tbilisi (3rd)	(Romania) Universitatea Craiova (2nd)	(Romania) Argeș Pitești (3rd)	(Turkey) Fenerbahçe (2nd)
(Turkey) Eskişehirspor (3rd)	(France) Nice (2nd)	(France) Marseille (3rd)	(Greece) Panathinaikos (3rd)
(Greece) Panachaiki (4th)	(Austria) GAK (3rd)	(Austria) Admira/Wacker (4th)	(Bulgaria) Lokomotiv Plovdiv (2nd)
(Bulgaria) Slavia Sofia (3rd)	(Denmark) B1903 (2nd)	(Denmark) Næstved (3rd)	(Switzerland) Grasshoppers (2nd)
(Switzerland) Sion (3rd)	(Sweden) AIK (2nd)	(Sweden) Östers (3rd)	(Norway) Fredrikstad (2nd)
(Norway) Strømsgodset (3rd)	(Northern Ireland) Ards (2nd)	(Malta) Sliema Wanderers (2nd)	(Finland) MP Mikkeli (2nd)
Union Luxembourg (2nd)	(Republic of Ireland) Finn Harps (2nd)	(Iceland) Keflavík (3rd)	(Cyprus) Olympiakos Nicosia (2nd)

Notes

1. England: Although the Inter-Cities Fairs Cup old entry criterium of 'one city, one team' had been dispensed with the creation of the UEFA Cup, the Football Association retained it in their regulations, only being changed after the end of the 1974–1975 season. Arsenal finished 2nd in the 1972–73 Football League but couldn't qualify for the UEFA Cup, as Tottenham Hotspur was deemed as London's representative team via their League Cup title, which took precedence. As a result, Wolverhampton Wanderers inherited the remaining UEFA Cup spot.

== Schedule ==
The schedule of the competition: Matches were scheduled for Wednesdays, though some matches took place on Tuesdays, including the first leg of the final. Both legs of the first round match phase between VfB Stuttgart and Olympiakos Nicosia were played in the same week over three days, with the first leg being held on a Monday. Two other matches in the first leg of the first round, three matches were held on a Thursday and a Saturday, respectively.

Schedule for 1973–74 UEFA Cup
Round	First leg	Second leg
First round	12–26 September 1973	19 September – 3 October 1973
Second round	16–24 October 1973	6–7 November 1973
Third round	27 November – 12 December 1973	12–19 December 1973
Quarter-finals	6 March 1974	20 March 1974
Semi-finals	10 April 1974	24 April 1974
Final	21 May 1974	29 May 1974

== First round ==
Team 1	Agg.	Team 2	1st leg	2nd leg
Fredrikstad (Norway)	0–5	(Soviet Union) Dynamo Kyiv	0–1	0–4
Ruch Chorzów (Poland)	8–6	(West Germany) Wuppertaler SV	4–1	4–5
B 1903 (Denmark)	3–2	(Sweden) AIK	2–1	1–1
Carl Zeiss Jena (East Germany)	6–0	(Finland) Mikkelin Palloilijat	3–0	3–0
Strømsgodset (Norway)	2–7	(England) Leeds United	1–1	1–6
Öster (Sweden)	2–5	(Netherlands) Feyenoord	1–3	1–2
Hibernian (Scotland)	3–1	(Iceland) Keflavík	2–0	1–1
Nice (France)	3–2	(Spain) Barcelona	3–0	0–2
Fortuna Düsseldorf (West Germany)	3–2	(Denmark) Naestved	1–0	2–2
Grasshoppers (Switzerland)	2–9	(England) Tottenham Hotspur	1–5	1–4
Aberdeen (Scotland)	7–2	(Republic of Ireland) Finn Harps	4–1	3–1
Dundee (Scotland)	3–7	(Netherlands) Twente	1–3	2–4
Espanyol (Spain)	2–4	(Belgium) Molenbeek	0–3	2–1
Belenenses (Portugal)	1–4	(England) Wolverhampton Wanderers	0–2	1–2
Union Luxembourg	1–12	(France) Marseille	0–5	1–7
Vitória Setúbal (Portugal)	4–0	(Belgium) Beerschot	2–0	2–0
Ipswich Town (England)	1–0	(Spain) Real Madrid	1–0	0–0
Lazio (Italy)	4–3	(Switzerland) Sion	3–0	1–3
Sliema Wanderers (Malta)	0–3	(Bulgaria) Lokomotiv Plovdiv	0–2	0–1
Fiorentina (Italy)	0–1	(Romania) Universitatea Craiova	0–0	0–1
Ferencváros (Hungary)	1–3	(Poland) Gwardia Warsaw	0–1	1–2
VfB Stuttgart (West Germany)	13–0	(Cyprus) Olympiakos Nicosia	9–0	4–0
Tatran Prešov (Czechoslovakia)	5–3	(Socialist Federal Republic of Yugoslavia) Velež Mostar	4–2	1–1
Dinamo Tbilisi (Soviet Union)	4–3	(Bulgaria) Slavia Sofia	4–1	0–2
Panathinaikos (Greece)	2–2 (a)	(Socialist Federal Republic of Yugoslavia) OFK Beograd	1–2	1–0
Admira/Wacker (Austria)	2–2 (a)	(Italy) Inter Milan	1–0	1–2 (a.e.t.)
Fenerbahçe (Turkey)	6–2	(Romania) Argeș Pitești	5–1	1–1
VSS (Czechoslovakia)	3–5	(Hungary) Honvéd	1–0	2–5
Torino (Italy)	2–4	(East Germany) Lokomotive Leipzig	1–2	1–2
Eskişehirspor (Turkey)	0–2	(West Germany) 1. FC Köln	0–0	0–2
Panachaiki (Greece)	3–1	(Austria) GAK	2–1	1–0
Ards (Northern Ireland)	4–8	(Belgium) Standard Liège	3–2	1–6

=== First leg ===
19 September 1973

Fredrikstad (Norway)	0–1	(Soviet Union) Dynamo Kyiv
	Report	Kondratov 6'

Fredrikstad Stadion, Fredrikstad
Attendance: 2,394
Referee: Hugh Wilson (Northern Ireland)

19 September 1973

Ruch Chorzów (Poland)	4–1	(West Germany) Wuppertaler SV
Bula 8'; Marx 48'; Herisz 74'; Maszczyk 79'	Report	Köhle 70' (pen.)

Stadion Miejski, Chorzów
Attendance: 35,000
Referee: Michel Kitabdjian (France)

19 September 1973

B 1903 (Denmark)	2–1	(Sweden) AIK
Nielsen 24'; Thorn 40'	Report	Zetterlund 37'

Gentofte Sportspark, Gentofte
Attendance: 2,077
Referee: Henry Øberg (Norway)

19 September 1973

Carl Zeiss Jena (East Germany)	3–0	(Finland) Mikkelin Palloilijat
Bransch 26'; Schlutter 40'; Scheitler 52'	Report

Ernst-Abbe-Sportfeld, Jena
Attendance: 4,228
Referee: Clive Thomas (Wales)

19 September 1973

Strømsgodset (Norway)	1–1	(England) Leeds United
Amundsen 24'	Report	Clarke 15'

Ullevaal Stadion, Oslo
Attendance: 16,276
Referee: Sven Jonsson (Sweden)

19 September 1973

Öster (Sweden)	1–3	(Netherlands) Feyenoord
Svensson 3'	Report	Van Hanegem 46', 74'; Wery 89'

Värendsvallen, Växjö
Attendance: 12,531
Referee: Joseph Minnoy (Belgium)

19 September 1973

Hibernian (Scotland)	2–0	(Iceland) Keflavík
Black 41'; Higgins 64'	Report

Easter Road, Edinburgh
Attendance: 13,652
Referee: Robert Héliès (France)

19 September 1973

Nice (France)	3–0	(Spain) Barcelona
Van Dijk 4'; Molitor 66', 79'	Report

Stade du Ray, Nice
Attendance: 11,229
Referee: Concetto Lo Bello (Italy)

19 September 1973

Fortuna Düsseldorf (West Germany)	1–0	(Denmark) Naestved
Hesse 52'	Report

Rheinstadion, Düsseldorf
Attendance: 6,329
Referee: Ken Burns (England)

19 September 1973

Grasshoppers (Switzerland)	1–5	(England) Tottenham Hotspur
Noventa 44' (pen.)	Report	Chivers 5', 72'; Evans 31'; Gilzean 80', 85'

Hardturm, Zürich
Attendance: 10,314
Referee: Bohumil Kopcio (Czechoslovakia)

19 September 1973

Aberdeen (Scotland)	4–1	(Republic of Ireland) Finn Harps
Miller 32'; Jarvie 36', 82'; Graham 37'	Report	Harkin 88'

Pittodrie Stadium, Aberdeen
Attendance: 10,719
Referee: Erik Axelryd (Sweden)

19 September 1973

Dundee (Scotland)	1–3	(Netherlands) Twente
Stewart 59'	Report	Achterberg 32'; Jeuring 59', 79'

Dens Park, Dundee
Attendance: 11,210
Referee: Svein-Inge Thime (Norway)

19 September 1973

Espanyol (Spain)	0–3	(Belgium) Molenbeek
	Report	Koens 19'; Polleunis 38'; Teugels 84'

Sarrià Stadium, Barcelona
Attendance: 15,000
Referee: António Garrido (Portugal)

26 September 1973

Belenenses (Portugal)	0–2	(England) Wolverhampton Wanderers
	Report	Richard 19'; Dougan 54'

Estádio do Restelo, Lisbon
Attendance: 8,150
Referee: Ángel Franco Martínez (Spain)

18 September 1973

Union Luxembourg	0–5	(France) Marseille
	Report	Hardt 10' (o.g.); Kuszowski 15', 30', 58'; Buigues 71'

Stade Josy Barthel, Luxembourg
Attendance: 2,481
Referee: Ferdinand Biwersi (West Germany)

12 September 1973

Vitória Setúbal (Portugal)	2–0	(Belgium) Beerschot
Torres 30', 39'	Report

Estádio do Bonfim, Setúbal
Attendance: 8,000
Referee: Roger Mâchin (France)

19 September 1973

Ipswich Town (England)	1–0	(Spain) Real Madrid
Rubiñán 52' (o.g.)	Report

Portman Road, Ipswich
Attendance: 25,064
Referee: Stanisław Eksztajn (Poland)

19 September 1973

Lazio (Italy)	3–0	(Switzerland) Sion
Chinaglia 2', 22' (pen.), 38' (pen.)	Report

Stadio Olimpico, Rome
Attendance: 24,247
Referee: Joseph Cassar-Naudi (Malta)

22 September 1973

Sliema Wanderers (Malta)	0–2	(Bulgaria) Lokomotiv Plovdiv
	Report	Vasilev 5'; Camilleri 23' (o.g.)

Empire Stadium, Gżira
Attendance: 4,341
Referee: Alberto Michelotti (Italy)

19 September 1973

Fiorentina (Italy)	0–0	(Romania) Universitatea Craiova
	Report

Stadio Comunale, Florence
Attendance: 18,000
Referee: Atanas Mateev (Bulgaria)

19 September 1973

Ferencváros (Hungary)	0–1	(Poland) Gwardia Warsaw
	Report	Szymczak 40'

Ferenc Puskás Stadium, Budapest
Attendance: 27,130
Referee: Iosif Samusenkov (Soviet Union)

17 September 1973

VfB Stuttgart (West Germany)	9–0	(Cyprus) Olympiakos Nicosia
Ettmayer 17', 70'; Brenninger 19' (pen.); Ohlicher 33'; Mall 39'; Entenmann 43', 59', 84'; Weidmann 72'	Report

Neckarstadion, Stuttgart
Attendance: 9,583
Referee: Leo van der Kroft (Netherlands)

19 September 1973

Tatran Prešov (Czechoslovakia)	4–2	(Socialist Federal Republic of Yugoslavia) Velež Mostar
Turčányi 20'; Novák 24'; Sobota 38'; Čabala 65'	Report	Kvesić 5', 65'

Štadión Tatranu, Prešov
Attendance: 5,813
Referee: Vladimir Alov (Soviet Union)

19 September 1973

Dinamo Tbilisi (Soviet Union)	4–1	(Bulgaria) Slavia Sofia
G. Nodia 5'; Gavasheli 37'; L. Nodia 53'; Machaidze 84'	Report	Zhelyazkov 88'

Lenin Dinamo Stadium, Tbilisi
Attendance: 15,625
Referee: Lajos Somlai (Hungary)

19 September 1973

Panathinaikos (Greece)	1–2	(Socialist Federal Republic of Yugoslavia) OFK Beograd
Antoniadis 58' (pen.)	Report	Bajić 35'; Lukić 89'

Leoforos Alexandras Stadium, Athens
Attendance: 21,566
Referee: Gerhard Kunze (East Germany)

19 September 1973

Admira/Wacker (Austria)	1–0	(Italy) Inter Milan
Swojanowsky 7'	Report

Bundesstadion Südstadt, Maria Enzersdorf
Attendance: 5,845
Referee: Nicolae Rainea (Romania)

19 September 1973

Fenerbahçe (Turkey)	5–1	(Romania) Argeș Pitești
Turan 43', 46', 68'; Arpacıoğlu 49'; Kaplakaslan 63'	Report	Roșu 30'

İnönü Stadium, Istanbul
Attendance: 38,329
Referee: Erich Linemayr (Austria)

19 September 1973

VSS (Czechoslovakia)	1–0	(Hungary) Honvéd
Pollák 82'	Report

Všešportový areál, Košice
Attendance: 15,570
Referee: Aurel Bentu (Romania)

19 September 1973

Torino (Italy)	1–2	(East Germany) Lokomotive Leipzig
Bui 50'	Report	Löwe 66'; Köditz 77'

Stadio Olimpico Grande Torino, Turin
Attendance: 28,836
Referee: Franz Wöhrer (Austria)

19 September 1973

Eskişehirspor (Turkey)	0–0	(West Germany) 1. FC Köln
	Report

Eskişehir Atatürk Stadium, Eskişehir
Attendance: 9,295
Referee: Ziya Türkdoğan (Turkey)

20 September 1973

Panachaiki (Greece)	2–1	(Austria) GAK
Michalopoulos 16'; Spentzopoulos 41'	Report	Koleznik 30'

Leoforos Alexandras Stadium, Athens
Attendance: 10,514
Referee: Gyula Emsberger (Hungary)

12 September 1973

Ards (Northern Ireland)	3–2	(Belgium) Standard Liège
Cathcart 24'; McAvoy 27' (pen.); McAteer 55' (pen.)	Report	Bukal 5', 32'

Castlereagh Park, Newtownards
Attendance: 6,285
Referee: Guðjón Finnbogason (Iceland)

=== Second leg ===
3 October 1973
19:00

Dynamo Kyiv (Soviet Union)	4–0	(Norway) Fredrikstad
Troshkin 15'; Kolotov 35'; Buryak 51'; Blokhin 90'	Report

Central Stadium, Kiev
Attendance: 18,259
Referee: Giorgos Katsoras (Greece)

Dynamo Kyiv won 5–0 on aggregate.

3 October 1973

Wuppertaler SV (West Germany)	5–4	(Poland) Ruch Chorzów
Stöckl 32'; Cremer 41', 73'; Pröpper 50'; Reichert 85'	Report	Benigier 8'; Kopicera 37'; Marx 40'; Bula 62'

Stadion am Zoo, Wuppertal
Attendance: 18,000
Referee: Ernst Dörflinger (Switzerland)

Ruch Chorzów won 8–6 on aggregate.

3 October 1973

AIK (Sweden)	1–1	(Denmark) B 1903
Åslund 50'	Report	Kristensen 70'

Råsunda Stadium, Solna
Attendance: 1,346
Referee: Martti Hirviniemi (Finland)

B 1903 won 3–2 on aggregate.

3 October 1973

Mikkelin Palloilijat (Finland)	0–3	(East Germany) Carl Zeiss Jena
	Report	Irmscher 30'; Ducke 35', 76'

Mikkelin Urheilupuisto, Mikkeli
Attendance: 1,010
Referee: Kaj Rasmussen (Denmark)

Carl Zeiss Jena won 6–0 on aggregate.

3 October 1973

Leeds United (England)	6–1	(Norway) Strømsgodset
Clarke 11', 42'; Jones 20', 84'; Gray 57'; Bates 62'	Report	Pettersen 18'

Elland Road, Leeds
Attendance: 18,710
Referee: Richard Casha (Malta)

Leeds United won 7–2 on aggregate.

3 October 1973

Feyenoord (Netherlands)	2–1	(Sweden) Öster
Kristensen 14'; De Jong 60'	Report	Klüft 84'

De Kuip, Rotterdam
Attendance: 25,000
Referee: Bobby Davidson (Scotland)

Feyenoord won 5–2 on aggregate.

3 October 1973

Keflavík (Iceland)	1–1	(Scotland) Hibernian
Zakaríasson 35'	Report	Stanton 63'

Keflavíkurvöllur, Keflavík
Attendance: 3,514
Referee: Dominic Byrne (Republic of Ireland)

Hibernian won 3–1 on aggregate.

3 October 1973

Barcelona (Spain)	2–0	(France) Nice
Sotil 21'; Juanito 62'	Report

Camp Nou, Barcelona
Attendance: 23,829
Referee: Alfred Delcourt (Belgium)

Nice won 3–2 on aggregate.

3 October 1973

Naestved (Denmark)	2–2	(West Germany) Fortuna Düsseldorf
Olsen 50'; Ottosen 89'	Report	Seel 30'; Herzog 70'

Næstved Stadium, Næstved
Attendance: 7,043
Referee: Arne Axelsson (Sweden)

Fortuna Düsseldorf won 3–2 on aggregate.

3 October 1973

Tottenham Hotspur (England)	4–1	(Switzerland) Grasshoppers
Lador 73' (o.g.); Peters 79', 88'; England 84'	Report	Elsener 24'

White Hart Lane, London
Attendance: 18,105
Referee: Robert Schaut (Belgium)

Tottenham Hotspur won 9–2 on aggregate.

3 October 1973
19:00

Finn Harps (Republic of Ireland)	1–3	(Scotland) Aberdeen
Harkin 67'	Report	Robb 21'; Jarvie 28'; Miller 89'

Finn Park, Ballybofey
Attendance: 3,434
Referee: Franz Geluck (Belgium)

Aberdeen won 7–2 on aggregate.

3 October 1973

Twente (Netherlands)	4–2	(Scotland) Dundee
Van der Vall 1'; Achterberg 9'; Zuidema 53', 77'	Report	Johnston 42'; Scott 62'

Diekman Stadion, Enschede
Attendance: 11,650
Referee: Pablo Sánchez Ibáñez (Spain)

Twente won 7–3 on aggregate.

3 October 1973

Molenbeek (Belgium)	1–2	(Spain) Espanyol
Polleunis 11'	Report	Amiano 15'; Solsona 79'

Edmond Machtens Stadium, Brussels
Attendance: 22,000
Referee: David W. Smith (England)

Molenbeek won 4–2 on aggregate.

3 October 1973

Wolverhampton Wanderers (England)	2–1	(Portugal) Belenenses
Eastoe 27'; McCalliog 72'	Report	Murça 7'

Molineux Stadium, Wolverhampton
Attendance: 16,010
Referee: Hans-Joachim Weyland (West Germany)

Wolverhampton Wanderers won 4–1 on aggregate.

3 October 1973

Marseille (France)	7–1	Union Luxembourg
Magnusson 16'; Skoblar 19', 36', 39'; Kuszowski 55'; Bracci 60' (pen.); Trésor 72'	Report	Hoffmann 61' (pen.)

Stade Vélodrome, Marseille
Attendance: 4,176
Referee: Roland Racine (Switzerland)

Marseille won 12–1 on aggregate.

26 September 1973

Beerschot (Belgium)	0–2	(Portugal) Vitória Setúbal
	Report	Maria 20'; Machado 68'

Olympisch Stadion, Antwerp
Attendance: 8,385
Referee: Riccardo Lattanzi (Italy)

Vitória Setúbal won 4–0 on aggregate.

3 October 1973

Real Madrid (Spain)	0–0	(England) Ipswich Town
	Report

Santiago Bernabéu, Madrid
Attendance: 68,049
Referee: René Vigliani (France)

Ipswich Town won 1–0 on aggregate.

3 October 1973

Sion (Switzerland)	3–1	(Italy) Lazio
Isoz 14', 90'; Barberis 57'	Report	Garlaschelli 10'

Stade Tourbillon, Sion
Attendance: 6,653
Referee: Ferdinand Biwersi (West Germany)

Lazio won 4–3 on aggregate.

2 October 1973

Lokomotiv Plovdiv (Bulgaria)	1–0	(Malta) Sliema Wanderers
Vasilev 22'	Report

Stadion Lokomotiv, Plovdiv
Attendance: 8,123
Referee: Nikola Mladenović (Yugoslavia)

Lokomotiv Plovdiv won 3–0 on aggregate.

3 October 1973

Universitatea Craiova (Romania)	1–0	(Italy) Fiorentina
Oblemenco 90'	Report

Stadionul Central, Craiova
Attendance: 24,000
Referee: Marijan Raus (Yugoslavia)

Universitatea Craiova won 1–0 on aggregate.

3 October 1973

Gwardia Warsaw (Poland)	2–1	(Hungary) Ferencváros
Wiśniewski 32' (pen.); Szymczak 39'	Report	Máté 89'

Stadion Wojska Polskiego, Warsaw
Attendance: 3,860
Referee: Petar Nikolov (Bulgaria)

Gwardia Warsaw won 3–1 on aggregate.

19 September 1973

Olympiakos Nicosia (Cyprus)	0–4	(West Germany) VfB Stuttgart
	Report	Ohlicher 11'; Martin 36'; Müller 59'; Ettmayer 67'

GSP Stadium, Nicosia
Attendance: 3,605
Referee: Joop Vervoort (Netherlands)

VfB Stuttgart won 13–0 on aggregate.

3 October 1973

Velež Mostar (Socialist Federal Republic of Yugoslavia)	1–1	(Czechoslovakia) Tatran Prešov
Čolić 77'	Report	Sobota 34'

Stadion pod Bijelim Brijegom, Mostar
Attendance: 4,509
Referee: György Müncz (Hungary)

Tatran Prešov won 5–3 on aggregate.

3 October 1973

Slavia Sofia (Bulgaria)	2–0	(Soviet Union) Dinamo Tbilisi
Krastev 49'; Grigorov 63'	Report

Vasil Levski National Stadium, Sofia
Attendance: 15,675
Referee: Muzaffer Sarvan (Turkey)

Dinamo Tbilisi won 5–3 on aggregate.

3 October 1973

OFK Beograd (Socialist Federal Republic of Yugoslavia)	0–1	(Greece) Panathinaikos
	Report	De Melo 21'

Omladinski Stadium, Belgrade
Attendance: 12,430
Referee: Michal Jursa (Czechoslovakia)

2–2 on aggregate. OFK Beograd won on away goals.

3 October 1973

Inter Milan (Italy)	2–1 (a.e.t.)	(Austria) Admira/Wacker
Moro 55'; Boninsegna 92'	Report	Kaltenbrunner 96'

San Siro, Milan
Attendance: 18,284
Referee: Rudi Glöckner (East Germany)

2–2 on aggregate. Admira/Wacker won on away goals.

3 October 1973

Argeș Pitești (Romania)	1–1	(Turkey) Fenerbahçe
Dobrin 13' (pen.)	Report	Turan 30'

Stadionul 1 Mai, Pitești
Attendance: 8,000
Referee: Nikolaos Zlatanos (Greece)

Fenerbahçe won 6–2 on aggregate.

3 October 1973

Honvéd (Hungary)	5–2	(Czechoslovakia) VSS
Pintér 1', 19'; Borták 60' (o.g.); Füle 65'; Szűcs 75'	Report	Pollák 12'; Štafura 28'

Bozsik József Stadion, Budapest
Attendance: 5,452
Referee: Marian Środecki (Poland)

Honvéd won 5–3 on aggregate.

3 October 1973

Lokomotive Leipzig (East Germany)	2–1	(Italy) Torino
Lisiewicz 8'; Matoul 45' (pen.)	Report	Sala 55'

Zentralstadion, Leipzig
Attendance: 31,805
Referee: Bertil Lööw (Sweden)

Lokomotive Leipzig won 4–2 on aggregate.

3 October 1973

1. FC Köln (West Germany)	2–0	(Turkey) Eskişehirspor
Lauscher 38'; Löhr 47'	Report

Müngersdorfer Stadion, Cologne
Attendance: 12,988
Referee: Antoine Queudeville (Luxembourg)

1. FC Köln won 2–0 on aggregate.

3 October 1973

GAK (Austria)	0–1	(Greece) Panachaiki
	Report	Spentzopoulos 46'

Liebenauer Stadium, Graz
Attendance: 6,607
Referee: Karl Keller (Switzerland)

Panachaiki won 3–1 on aggregate.

19 September 1973

Standard Liège (Belgium)	6–1	(Northern Ireland) Ards
Henrotay 18'; Bukal 23', 69', 75' (pen.); Lambrichts 41'; Govaert 72'	Report	Guy 43'

Stade Maurice Dufrasne, Liège
Attendance: 30,000
Referee: Wolfgang Riedel (East Germany)

Standard Liège won 8–4 on aggregate.

== Second round ==
Team 1	Agg.	Team 2	1st leg	2nd leg
Admira/Wacker (Austria)	2–4	(West Germany) Fortuna Düsseldorf	2–1	0–3
Aberdeen (Scotland)	2–5	(England) Tottenham Hotspur	1–1	1–4
Dinamo Tbilisi (Soviet Union)	8–1	(Socialist Federal Republic of Yugoslavia) OFK Beograd	3–0	5–1
Nice (France)	4–2	(Turkey) Fenerbahçe	4–0	0–2
Lokomotive Leipzig (East Germany)	4–4 (a)	(England) Wolverhampton Wanderers	3–0	1–4
Panachaiki (Greece)	1–8	(Netherlands) Twente	1–1	0–7
Vitória Setúbal (Portugal)	2–2 (a)	(Belgium) Molenbeek	1–0	1–2
Marseille (France)	2–6	(West Germany) 1. FC Köln	2–0	0–6
Ipswich Town (England)	6–4	(Italy) Lazio	4–0	2–4
Dynamo Kyiv (Soviet Union)	3–1	(Denmark) B 1903	1–0	2–1
Lokomotiv Plovdiv (Bulgaria)	5–7	(Hungary) Honvéd	3–4	2–3
Ruch Chorzów (Poland)	3–1	(East Germany) Carl Zeiss Jena	3–0	0–1
VfB Stuttgart (West Germany)	8–4	(Czechoslovakia) Tatran Prešov	3–1	5–3 (a.e.t.)
Leeds United (England)	0–0 (5–4 p)	(Scotland) Hibernian	0–0	0–0 (a.e.t.)
Feyenoord (Netherlands)	3–2	(Poland) Gwardia Warsaw	3–1	0–1
Standard Liège (Belgium)	3–1	(Romania) Universitatea Craiova	2–0	1–1

=== First leg ===
24 October 1973

Admira/Wacker (Austria)	2–1	(West Germany) Fortuna Düsseldorf
Kaltenbrunner 67', 78'	Report	Budde 26'

BSFZ-Arena, Maria Enzersdorf
Attendance: 1,336
Referee: Wiesław Karolak (Poland)

24 October 1973

Aberdeen (Scotland)	1–1	(England) Tottenham Hotspur
Hermiston 87' (pen.)	Report	Coates 15'

Pittodrie Stadium, Aberdeen
Attendance: 23,057
Referee: Samuel Patterson (Northern Ireland)

24 October 1973

Dinamo Tbilisi (Soviet Union)	3–0	(Socialist Federal Republic of Yugoslavia) OFK Beograd
Kipiani 26'; G. Nodia 35'; L. Nodia 60'	Report

Lenin Dinamo Stadium
Attendance: 35,000
Referee: Tsvetan Stanev (Bulgaria)

24 October 1973

Nice (France)	4–0	(Turkey) Fenerbahçe
Molitor 33', 41', 78', 84'	Report

Stade du Ray, Nice
Attendance: 12,449
Referee: Ken Burns (England)

24 October 1973

Lokomotive Leipzig (East Germany)	3–0	(England) Wolverhampton Wanderers
Matoul 37', 76' (pen.); Köditz 83'	Report

Zentralstadion, Leipzig
Attendance: 16,035
Referee: Joseph Minnoy (Belgium)

24 October 1973

Panachaiki (Greece)	1–1	(Netherlands) Twente
Davourlis 16' (pen.)	Report	Thijssen 24'

Stadium of Panachaiki, Patras
Attendance: 13,000
Referee: Nicolae Petriceanu (Romania)

16 October 1973

Vitória Setúbal (Portugal)	1–0	(Belgium) Molenbeek
Belmondo 60'	Report

Estádio do Bonfim, Setúbal
Attendance: 8,000
Referee: John Gordon (Scotland)

23 October 1973

Marseille (France)	2–0	(West Germany) 1. FC Köln
Lopez 68'; Kuszowski 74'	Report

Stade Vélodrome, Marseille
Attendance: 33,415
Referee: Iorwerth Jones (Wales)

24 October 1973

Ipswich Town (England)	4–0	(Italy) Lazio
Whymark 16', 42', 47', 56'	Report

Portman Road, Ipswich
Attendance: 26,433
Referee: Bertil Lööw (Sweden)

24 October 1973
19:00

Dynamo Kyiv (Soviet Union)	1–0	(Denmark) B 1903
Buryak 67'	Report

Central Stadium, Kyiv
Attendance: 13,186
Referee: Hilmi Ok (Turkey)

24 October 1973

Lokomotiv Plovdiv (Bulgaria)	3–4	(Hungary) Honvéd
Bosakov 39'; Ivanov 39'; Bonev 90'	Report	Kozma 18', 26'; Kocsis 44'; Pal 63'

Stadion Lokomotiv, Plovdiv
Attendance: 3,893
Referee: Zdeněk Jelínek (Czechoslovakia)

24 October 1973

Ruch Chorzów (Poland)	3–0	(East Germany) Carl Zeiss Jena
Benigier 38'; Kopicera 64'; Bula 80'	Report

Stadion Miejski, Chorzów
Attendance: 7,000
Referee: Dusan Maksimović (Yugoslavia)

24 October 1973

VfB Stuttgart (West Germany)	3–1	(Czechoslovakia) Tatran Prešov
Müller 48'; Brenninger 62'; Ohlicher 83'	Report	Škorupa 26'

Neckarstadion, Stuttgart
Attendance: 10,382
Referee: Svein-Inge Thime (Norway)

24 October 1973

Leeds United (England)	0–0	(Scotland) Hibernian
	Report

Elland Road, Leeds
Attendance: 27,145
Referee: Károly Palotai (Hungary)

24 October 1973

Feyenoord (Netherlands)	3–1	(Poland) Gwardia Warsaw
Schoenmaker 60', 87'; De Jong 72'	Report	Szymczak 35'

De Kuip, Rotterdam
Attendance: 14,563
Referee: Joaquim Fernandes Campos (Portugal)

24 October 1973

Standard Liège (Belgium)	2–0	(Romania) Universitatea Craiova
Bukal 21', 65' (pen.)	Report

Stade Maurice Dufrasne, Liège
Attendance: 20,000
Referee: Ángel Franco Martinez (Spain)

=== Second leg ===
6 November 1973

Fortuna Düsseldorf (West Germany)	3–0	(Austria) Admira/Wacker
Brei 10', 17'; Geye 25'	Report

Rheinstadion, Düsseldorf
Attendance: 8,852
Referee: Antonio Rigo Sureda (Spain)

Fortuna Düsseldorf won 4–2 on aggregate.

7 November 1973

Tottenham Hotspur (England)	4–1	(Scotland) Aberdeen
Peters 13'; Neighbour 37'; McGrath 80', 89'	Report	Jarvie 54'

White Hart Lane, London
Attendance: 21,785
Referee: Kurt Tschenscher (West Germany)

Tottenham Hotspur won 5–2 on aggregate.

7 November 1973

OFK Beograd (Socialist Federal Republic of Yugoslavia)	1–5	(Soviet Union) Dinamo Tbilisi
Stojanović 85' (pen.)	Report	Chelidze 7'; G. Nodia 17'; Kipiani 35', 62'; Tsereteli 72'

Omladinski Stadium, Belgrade
Attendance: 503
Referee: Tony Briguglio (Malta)

Dinamo Tbilisi won 8–1 on aggregate.

7 November 1973

Fenerbahçe (Turkey)	2–0	(France) Nice
Arpacıoğlu 44', 60' (pen.)	Report

İnönü Stadium, Istanbul
Attendance: 34,636
Referee: Lajos Somlai (Hungary)

Nice won 4–2 on aggregate.

7 November 1973

Wolverhampton Wanderers (England)	4–1	(East Germany) Lokomotive Leipzig
Kindon 53'; Munro 67'; Dougan 74'; Hibbitt 82'	Report	Löwe 72'

Molineux Stadium, Wolverhampton
Attendance: 14,530
Referee: António Garrido (Portugal)

4–4 on aggregate. Lokomotive Leipzig won on away goals.

7 November 1973

Twente (Netherlands)	7–0	(Greece) Panachaiki
Pahlplatz 52', 60', 61', 68'; Zuidema 64'; Van der Vall 70' (pen.); Van Ierssel 72'	Report

Diekman Stadion, Enschede
Attendance: 10,441
Referee: Heinz Einbeck (East Germany)

Twente won 8–1 on aggregate.

7 November 1973

Molenbeek (Belgium)	2–1	(Portugal) Vitória Setúbal
Depireux 20'; Veenstra 77'	Report	Belmondo 89'

Edmond Machtens Stadium, Brussels
Attendance: 14,822
Referee: Franz Wöhrer (Austria)

2–2 on aggregate. Vitória Setúbal won on away goals.

6 November 1973

1. FC Köln (West Germany)	6–0	(France) Marseille
Flohe 7'; Müller 10', 37'; Overath 40' (pen.); Löhr 47', 55'	Report

Müngersdorfer Stadion, Cologne
Attendance: 16,251
Referee: Michal Jursa (Czechoslovakia)

1. FC Köln won 6–2 on aggregate.

7 November 1973

Lazio (Italy)	4–2	(England) Ipswich Town
Garlaschelli 1'; Chinaglia 26', 83' (pen.), 86'	Report	Viljoen 70'; Johnson 90'

Stadio Olimpico, Rome
Attendance: 19,772
Referee: Leo van der Kroft (Netherlands)

Ipswich Town won 6–4 on aggregate.

7 November 1973
19:30

B 1903 (Denmark)	1–2	(Soviet Union) Dynamo Kyiv
Kristensen 80'	Report	Kolotov 51'; Troshkin 68'

Idrætsparken, Copenhagen
Attendance: 6,400
Referee: Magnús Pétursson (Iceland)

Dynamo Kyiv won 3–1 on aggregate.

7 November 1973

Honvéd (Hungary)	3–2	(Bulgaria) Lokomotiv Plovdiv
Kozma 43', 64'; Pintér 54'	Report	Ivanov 69'; Vasilev 89'

Bozsik József Stadion, Budapest
Attendance: 8,305
Referee: David W. Smith (England)

Honvéd won 7–5 on aggregate.

7 November 1973

Carl Zeiss Jena (East Germany)	1–0	(Poland) Ruch Chorzów
Bransch 72'	Report

Ernst-Abbe-Sportfeld, Jena
Attendance: 8,138
Referee: Nicolae Petriceanu (Romania)

Ruch Chorzów won 3–1 on aggregate.

7 November 1973

Tatran Prešov (Czechoslovakia)	3–5 (a.e.t.)	(West Germany) VfB Stuttgart
Turčányi 33' (pen.), 74'; Škorupa 66'	Report	Ohlicher 40', 117'; Handschuh 95', 115'; Turčányi 110' (o.g.)

Štadión Tatranu, Prešov
Attendance: 6,032
Referee: Karl Keller (Switzerland)

VfB Stuttgart won 8–4 on aggregate.

7 November 1973

Hibernian (Scotland)	0–0 (a.e.t.)	(England) Leeds United
	Report
Penalties
Stanton (penalty missed); Cropley (penalty scored); Blackley (penalty scored); D. Bremner (penalty scored); Hazel (penalty scored)	4–5	(penalty scored) Lorimer; (penalty scored) Gray; (penalty scored) Bates; (penalty scored) Clarke; (penalty scored) B. Bremner

Easter Road, Edinburgh
Attendance: 36,014
Referee: Paul Schiller (Austria)

0–0 on aggregate. Leeds United won 5–4 on penalties.

7 November 1973

Gwardia Warsaw (Poland)	1–0	(Netherlands) Feyenoord
Szymczak 42'	Report

Stadion Gwardii Warszawa, Warsaw
Attendance: 3,173
Referee: Robert Héliès (France)

Feyenoord won 3–2 on aggregate.

7 November 1973

Universitatea Craiova (Romania)	1–1	(Belgium) Standard Liège
Bălan 43'	Report	Henrotay 67'

Stadionul Central, Craiova
Attendance: 22,000
Referee: Ertugrul Dilek (Turkey)

Standard Liège won 3–1 on aggregate.

== Third round ==
Team 1	Agg.	Team 2	1st leg	2nd leg
Dynamo Kyiv (Soviet Union)	2–3	(West Germany) VfB Stuttgart	2–0	0–3
Dinamo Tbilisi (Soviet Union)	2–6	(England) Tottenham Hotspur	1–1	1–5
Ipswich Town (England)	3–1	(Netherlands) Twente	1–0	2–1
Honvéd (Hungary)	2–5	(Poland) Ruch Chorzów	2–0	0–5
Leeds United (England)	2–3	(Portugal) Vitória Setúbal	1–0	1–3
Fortuna Düsseldorf (West Germany)	2–4	(East Germany) Lokomotive Leipzig	2–1	0–3
Nice (France)	1–4	(West Germany) 1. FC Köln	1–0	0–4
Standard Liège (Belgium)	3–3 (a)	(Netherlands) Feyenoord	3–1	0–2

=== First leg ===
27 November 1973
19:00

Dynamo Kyiv (Soviet Union)	2–0	(West Germany) VfB Stuttgart
Veremeyev 16'; Troshkin 62'	Report

Central Stadium, Kyiv
Attendance: 18,807
Referee: Ken Burns (England)

28 November 1973

Dinamo Tbilisi (Soviet Union)	1–1	(England) Tottenham Hotspur
Asatiani 71'	Report	Coates 25'

Lenin Dinamo Stadium, Tbilisi
Attendance: 45,000
Referee: Franz Wöhrer (Austria)

28 November 1973

Ipswich Town (England)	1–0	(Netherlands) Twente
Whymark 81'	Report

Portman Road, Ipswich
Attendance: 18,944
Referee: Michal Jursa (Czechoslovakia)

28 November 1973

Honvéd (Hungary)	2–0	(Poland) Ruch Chorzów
Pusztai 30', 67'	Report

Bozsik József Stadion, Budapest
Attendance: 3,254
Referee: Vital Loraux (Belgium)

28 November 1973

Leeds United (England)	1–0	(Portugal) Vitória Setúbal
Cherry 70'	Report

Elland Road, Leeds
Attendance: 14,202
Referee: Preben Christophersen (Denmark)

28 November 1973

Fortuna Düsseldorf (West Germany)	2–1	(East Germany) Lokomotive Leipzig
Brei 59'; Herzog 67'	Report	Matoul 41' (pen.)

Rheinstadion, Düsseldorf
Attendance: 34,262
Referee: Iorwerth Jones, Wales

28 November 1973

Nice (France)	1–0	(West Germany) 1. FC Köln
Eriksson 70'	Report

Stade du Ray, Nice
Attendance: 18,155
Referee: Ángel Franco Martínez (Spain)

12 December 1973

Standard Liège (Belgium)	3–1	(Netherlands) Feyenoord
Piot 68' (pen.); Lambrichts 73'; Thissen 89'	Report	Kristensen 48'

Stade Maurice Dufrasne, Liège
Attendance: 14,407
Referee: Concetto Lo Bello (Italy)

=== Second leg ===
12 December 1973
19:30

VfB Stuttgart (West Germany)	3–0	(Soviet Union) Dynamo Kyiv
Ohlicher 40'; Handschuh 75'; Martin 87'	Report

Neckarstadion, Stuttgart
Attendance: 26,824
Referee: Károly Palotai (Hungary)

VfB Stuttgart won 3–2 on aggregate.

12 December 1973

Tottenham Hotspur (England)	5–1	(Soviet Union) Dinamo Tbilisi
McGrath 29'; Chivers 52', 77'; Peters 61', 80'	Report	Ebralidze 55'

White Hart Lane, London
Attendance: 18,602
Referee: René Vigliani (France)

Tottenham Hotspur won 6–2 on aggregate.

12 December 1973

Twente (Netherlands)	1–2	(England) Ipswich Town
Streuer 82'	Report	Morris 57'; Hamilton 70'

Diekman Stadion, Enschede
Attendance: 17,862
Referee: Rudolf Scheurer (Switzerland)

Ipswich Town won 3–1 on aggregate.

12 December 1973

Ruch Chorzów (Poland)	5–0	(Hungary) Honvéd
Bon 34'; Kopicera 52', 72'; Marx 60'; Bula 62'	Report

Stadion Miejski, Chorzów
Attendance: 12,000
Referee: Doğan Babacan (Turkey)

Ruch Chorzów won 5–2 on aggregate.

12 December 1973

Vitória Setúbal (Portugal)	3–1	(England) Leeds United
Machado 51', 74'; Torres 62'	Report	Liddell 81'

Estádio do Bonfim, Setúbal
Attendance: 14,576
Referee: Arie van Gemert (Netherlands)

Vitória Setúbal won 3–2 on aggregate.

12 December 1973

Lokomotive Leipzig (East Germany)	3–0	(West Germany) Fortuna Düsseldorf
Lisiewicz 43'; Löwe 46'; Frenzel 55'	Report

Zentralstadion, Leipzig
Attendance: 71,066
Referee: Aurelio Angonese (Italy)

Lokomotive Leipzig won 4–2 on aggregate.

12 December 1973

(West Germany) 1. FC Köln	4–0	Nice (France)
D. Müller 22'; Flohe 32', 83'; Löhr 85'	Report

Müngersdorfer Stadion, Cologne
Attendance: 15,471
Referee: John Wright Paterson (Scotland)

1. FC Köln won 4–1 on aggregate.

19 December 1973

Feyenoord (Netherlands)	2–0	(Belgium) Standard Liège
Schoenmaker 61'; Van Hanegem 69'	Report

De Kuip, Rotterdam
Attendance: 41,131
Referee: Ferdinand Biwersi (West Germany)

3–3 on aggregate. Feyenoord won on away goals.

== Quarter-finals ==
Team 1	Agg.	Team 2	1st leg	2nd leg
Ipswich Town (England)	1–1 (3–4 p)	(East Germany) Lokomotive Leipzig	1–0	0–1 (a.e.t.)
1. FC Köln (West Germany)	1–5	(England) Tottenham Hotspur	1–2	0–3
VfB Stuttgart (West Germany)	3–2	(Portugal) Vitória Setúbal	1–0	2–2
Ruch Chorzów (Poland)	2–4	(Netherlands) Feyenoord	1–1	1–3 (a.e.t.)

=== First leg ===
6 March 1974

Ipswich Town (England)	1–0	(East Germany) Lokomotive Leipzig
Beattie 86'	Report

Portman Road, Ipswich
Attendance: 26,466
Referee: Lajos Somlai (Hungary)

6 March 1974

1. FC Köln (West Germany)	1–2	(England) Tottenham Hotspur
D. Müller 54'	Report	McGrath 18'; Peters 75'

Müngersdorfer Stadion, Cologne
Attendance: 27,021
Referee: Gheorge Limona (Romania)

6 March 1974

VfB Stuttgart (West Germany)	1–0	(Portugal) Vitória Setúbal
Stickel 70'	Report

Neckarstadion, Stuttgart
Attendance: 20,388
Referee: Valentin Lipatov (Soviet Union)

6 March 1974

Ruch Chorzów (Poland)	1–1	(Netherlands) Feyenoord
Maszczyk 90'	Report	Schoenmaker 67'

Stadion Miejski, Chorzów
Attendance: 30,000
Referee: Ken Burns (England)

=== Second leg ===
20 March 1974

Lokomotive Leipzig (East Germany)	1–0 (a.e.t.)	(England) Ipswich Town
Gießner 50'	Report
Penalties
Matoul (penalty scored); Geisler (penalty scored); Frenzel (penalty missed); Fritsche (penalty scored); Gröbner (penalty missed); Moldt (penalty scored)	4–3	(penalty scored) Talbot; (penalty missed) Morris; (penalty scored) Whymark; (penalty scored) Beattie; (penalty missed) Johnson; (penalty missed) Hunter

Zentralstadion, Leipzig
Attendance: 57,948
Referee: Ángel Franco Martínez (Spain)

1–1 on aggregate. Lokomotive Leipzig won 4–3 on penalties.

20 March 1974

Tottenham Hotspur (England)	3–0	(West Germany) 1. FC Köln
Chivers 11'; Coates 15'; Peters 49'	Report

White Hart Lane, London
Attendance: 40,933
Referee: Paolo Toselli (Italy)

Tottenham Hotspur won 5–1 on aggregate.

20 March 1974

Vitória Setúbal (Portugal)	2–2	(West Germany) VfB Stuttgart
Torres 30'; Maria 40'	Report	Ohlicher 47'; Stickel 68'

Estádio do Bonfim, Setúbal
Attendance: 7,000
Referee: Iorwerth Jones (Wales)

VfB Stuttgart won 3–2 on aggregate.

20 March 1974

Feyenoord (Netherlands)	3–1 (a.e.t.)	(Poland) Ruch Chorzów
Schoenmaker 55' (pen.), 95'; De Jong 91'	Report	Marx 20'

De Kuip, Rotterdam
Attendance: 44,624
Referee: Franz Wöhrer (Austria)

Feyenoord won 4–2 on aggregate.

== Semi-finals ==
Team 1	Agg.	Team 2	1st leg	2nd leg
Lokomotive Leipzig (East Germany)	1–4	(England) Tottenham Hotspur	1–2	0–2
Feyenoord (Netherlands)	4–3	(West Germany) VfB Stuttgart	2–1	2–2

=== First leg ===
10 April 1974

Lokomotive Leipzig (East Germany)	1–2	(England) Tottenham Hotspur
Löwe 57'	Report	Peters 15'; Coates 27'

Zentralstadion, Leipzig
Attendance: 74,698
Referee: Robert Héliès (France)

10 April 1974

Feyenoord (Netherlands)	2–1	(West Germany) VfB Stuttgart
Schoenmaker 62', 68'	Report	Brenninger 24'

De Kuip, Rotterdam
Attendance: 55,500
Referee: Nicolae Rainea (Romania)

=== Second leg ===
24 April 1974

Tottenham Hotspur (England)	2–0	(East Germany) Lokomotive Leipzig
McGrath 57'; Chivers 87'	Report

White Hart Lane, London
Attendance: 41,390
Referee: Alfred Delcourt (Belgium)

Tottenham Hotspur won 4–1 on aggregate.

24 April 1974

VfB Stuttgart (West Germany)	2–2	(Netherlands) Feyenoord
Brenninger 55', 59' (pen.)	Report	Ressel 14'; Schoenmaker 47'

Neckarstadion, Stuttgart
Attendance: 65,000
Referee: John Wright Paterson (Scotland)

Feyenoord won 4–3 on aggregate.

== Final ==
=== First leg ===
21 May 1974

Tottenham Hotspur (England)	2–2	(Netherlands) Feyenoord
England 40'; Van Daele 63' (o.g.)	Report	Van Hanegem 43'; De Jong 84'

White Hart Lane, London
Attendance: 46,281
Referee: Rudolf Scheurer (Switzerland)

=== Second leg ===
29 May 1974

Feyenoord (Netherlands)	2–0	(England) Tottenham Hotspur
Rijsbergen 43'; Ressel 85'	Report

De Kuip, Rotterdam
Attendance: 59,317
Referee: Concetto Lo Bello (Italy)

Feyenoord won 4–2 on aggregate.
