= 1974 UEFA Cup final =

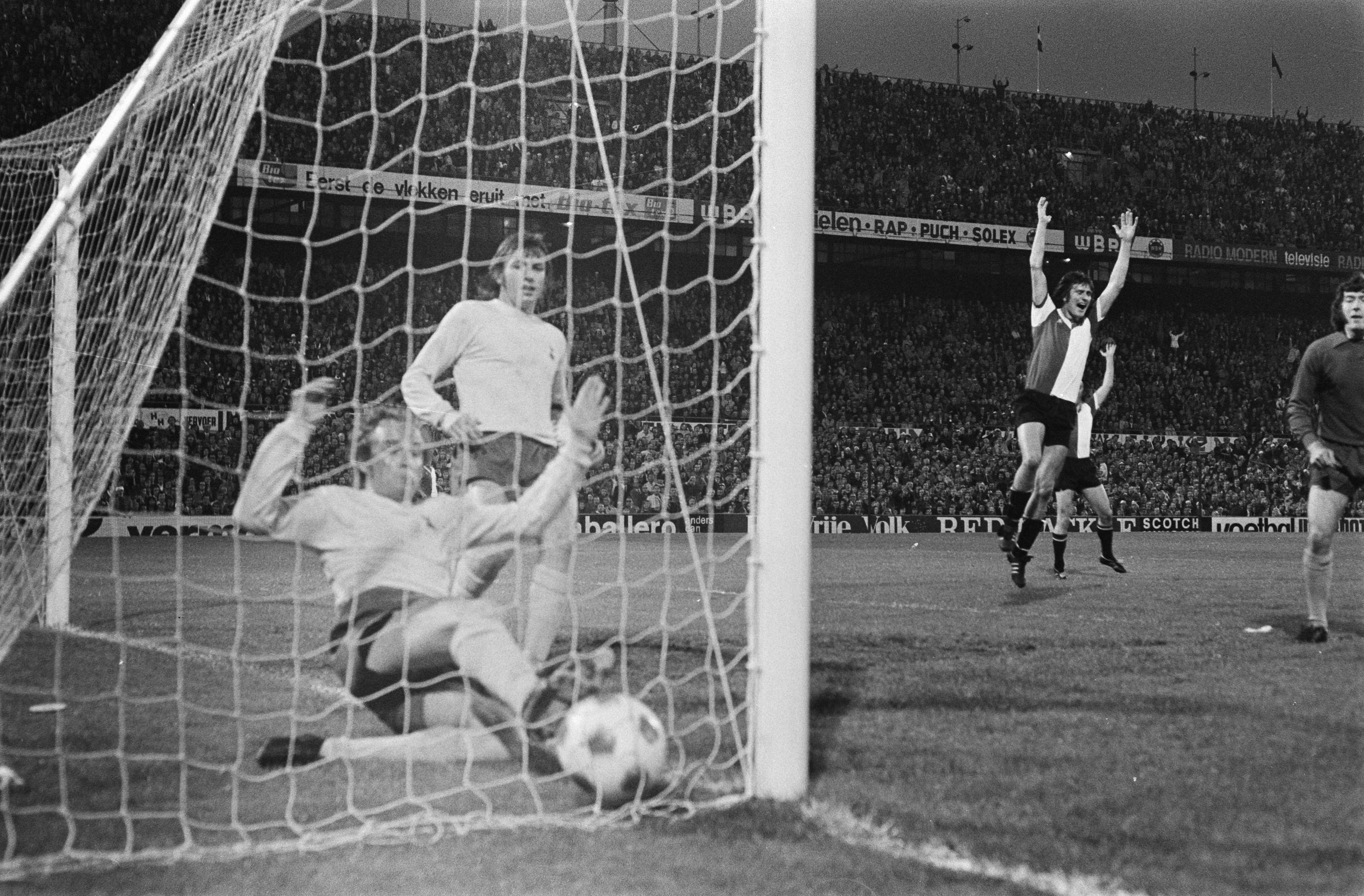
Tottenham Hotspur	Feyenoord
(England)	(Netherlands)
2	4
- on aggregate

First leg
Tottenham Hotspur	Feyenoord
2	2
- Date: 21 May 1974
- Venue: White Hart Lane, London
- Referee: Rudolf Scheurer (Switzerland)
- Attendance: 46,281

Second leg
Feyenoord	Tottenham Hotspur
2	0
- Date: 29 May 1974
- Venue: De Kuip, Rotterdam
- Referee: Concetto Lo Bello (Italy)
- Attendance: 59,317

The 1974 UEFA Cup Final was played on 21 May 1974 and 29 May 1974 between Tottenham Hotspur of England and Feyenoord Rotterdam of the Netherlands, to determine the champion of the 1973–74 UEFA Cup. Feyenoord won 4–2 on aggregate. Tottenham supporters rioted during the second leg in Rotterdam, which started after Feyenoord scored towards the end of the first half and continued into the second half.

== Route to the final ==
In the preceding five rounds of the competition, Tottenham had never been seriously threatened with elimination, as the London-based club outscored their opponents by a total of 29 goals to 8 en route to the final. In contrast, Feyenoord Rotterdam won several narrow victories in their cup ties: they advanced on away goals against Belgian side Standard in the third round and needed extra time in the return leg to beat Polish club Ruch Chorzów in the quarter-final. Additionally, leading up to the final, Feyenoord had won only one out of five legs that were played away from their home ground, De Kuip.

This marked the second time in three years that Spurs had reached the final of a UEFA Cup, having defeated fellow English side Wolves in the inaugural final.

Tottenham Hotspur				Round	Feyenoord			
Opponent	Agg.	1st leg	2nd leg		Opponent	Agg.	1st leg	2nd leg
(Switzerland) Grasshoppers	9–2	5–1 (A)	4–1 (H)	First round	(Sweden) Öster	5–2	3–1 (A)	2–1 (H)
(Scotland) Aberdeen	5–2	1–1 (A)	4–1 (H)	Second round	(Poland) Gwardia Warsaw	3–2	3–1 (H)	0–1 (A)
(Soviet Union) Dinamo Tbilisi	6–2	1–1 (A)	5–1 (H)	Third round	(Belgium) Standard Liège	3–3 (a)	1–3 (A)	2–0 (H)
(West Germany) 1. FC Köln	5–1	2–1 (A)	3–0 (H)	Quarter-finals	(Poland) Ruch Chorzów	4–2 (a.e.t.)	1–1 (A)	3–1 (a.e.t.) (H)
(East Germany) Lokomotive Leipzig	4–1	2–1 (A)	2–0 (H)	Semi-finals	(West Germany) VfB Stuttgart	4–3	2–1 (H)	2–2 (A)

== Match details ==
=== First leg ===
21 May 1974

Tottenham Hotspur (England)	2–2	(Netherlands) Feyenoord
England 39'; Van Daele 64' (o.g.)	Report Overview (archive) Overview	Van Hanegem 43'; De Jong 85'

White Hart Lane, London
Attendance: 46,281
Referee: Rudolf Scheurer (Switzerland)

Tottenham Hotspur	Feyenoord

GK	1	(Northern Ireland) Pat Jennings
RB	2	(England) Ray Evans
LB	3	(England) Terry Naylor
MF	4	(England) John Pratt
CB	5	(Wales) Mike England
CB	6	(England) Phil Beal	(substituted off) 81'
FW	7	(Northern Ireland) Chris McGrath
MF	8	(England) Steve Perryman
FW	9	(England) Martin Chivers
MF	10	(England) Martin Peters (c)
FW	11	(England) Ralph Coates
Substitutes:
CB	14	(England) Mike Dillon	(substituted on) 81'
Manager:
(England) Bill Nicholson

GK	1	(Netherlands) Eddy Treijtel
RB	2	(Netherlands) Wim Rijsbergen
CB	3	(Netherlands) Joop van Daele
CB	4	(Netherlands) Rinus Israël (c)
LB	5	(Netherlands) Harry Vos
FW	6	(Netherlands) Lex Schoenmaker
MF	7	(Netherlands) Wim Jansen
FW	8	(Netherlands) Peter Ressel
MF	9	(Netherlands) Theo de Jong
MF	10	(Netherlands) Willem van Hanegem
FW	11	(Denmark) Jørgen Kristensen
Manager:
(Netherlands) Wiel Coerver

=== Second leg ===
After holding Spurs to a 2–2 draw at London's White Hart Lane, Feyenoord went into their home leg as favourites. Their 2–0 victory at home secured the club their first UEFA Cup title.

The second leg in Rotterdam was marred by violence and hooliganism from rioting Spurs supporters.

29 May 1974

Feyenoord (Netherlands)	2–0	(England) Tottenham Hotspur
Rijsbergen 43'; Ressel 84'	Report Overview (archive) Overview

Feijenoord Stadion, Rotterdam
Attendance: 59,317
Referee: Concetto Lo Bello (Italy)

Feyenoord	Tottenham Hotspur

GK	1	(Netherlands) Eddy Treijtel
RB	2	(Netherlands) Wim Rijsbergen
CB	3	(Netherlands) Joop van Daele
CB	4	(Netherlands) Rinus Israël (c)
LB	5	(Netherlands) Harry Vos
MF	6	(Socialist Federal Republic of Yugoslavia) Mladen Ramljak
MF	7	(Netherlands) Wim Jansen
FW	8	(Netherlands) Peter Ressel
MF	9	(Netherlands) Theo de Jong
FW	10	(Netherlands) Lex Schoenmaker
FW	11	(Denmark) Jørgen Kristensen	(substituted off) 76'
Substitutes:
MF	12	(Netherlands) Johan Boskamp	(substituted on) 76'	(substituted off) 86'
FW	13	(Netherlands) Henk Wery		(substituted on) 86'
Manager:
(Netherlands) Wiel Coerver

GK	1	(Northern Ireland) Pat Jennings
RB	2	(England) Ray Evans
LB	3	(England) Terry Naylor
MF	4	(England) John Pratt	(substituted off) 77'
CB	5	(Wales) Mike England
CB	6	(England) Phil Beal
FW	7	(Northern Ireland) Chris McGrath
MF	8	(England) Steve Perryman
FW	9	(England) Martin Chivers
MF	10	(England) Martin Peters (c)
FW	11	(England) Ralph Coates
Substitutes:
MF	15	(England) Phil Holder	(substituted on) 77'
Manager:
(England) Bill Nicholson

== See also ==
- 1974 European Cup final
- 1974 European Cup Winners' Cup final
- Feyenoord in international football
- Tottenham Hotspur F.C. in European football
- 1973–74 Tottenham Hotspur F.C. season
