= List of F.C. Copenhagen managers =

This is a list of F.C. Copenhagen's managers and their records, from 1992, when the team was founded, to the present day.

== History ==
The first manager of F.C. Copenhagen was Benny Johansen, who was manager of one of the mother clubs, B 1903, before 1992. Johansen has sat the position twice: the first period ended in 1994, but later same year he substituted Keld Kristensen, who only received 8 matches with the team.

== Records ==
There have been eight different permanent and two caretaker managers of FCK since 1992; one of the caretakers (Kim Brink) has managed the club in three separate spells. The longest-running manager in terms of time is Hans Backe (2001–2005), who also is the longest-running in terms of games. The only two persons, who has managed FCK, that isn't from Scandinavia is Roy Hodgson and Ariël Jacobs. The most successful permanent manager was Kent Karlsson, in terms of percentage of wins with 55.38%, while Christian Andersen is FCK's least successful (0.00%). Andersen is also the shortest-running permanent manager of FCK, and received only a single match, before he was fired.

== Managers ==
As of 30 March 2026. Only competitive matches are counted. Wins, losses and draws are results at the final whistle; the results of penalty shoot-outs are not counted.

Name	Nationality	From	To	Record							Honours
Name	Nationality	From	To	P	W	D	L	F	A	%W	Honours
Benny Johansen	Denmark	1 July 1992	30 June 1994	87	45	16	26	156	121	51.72	1 Superliga Championship
Keld Kristensen	Denmark	1 July 1994	6 September 1994	8	1	2	5	12	18	12.50	
Benny Johansen	Denmark	6 September 1994	30 June 1995	33	15	8	10	57	50	45.45	1 Danish Cup
Michael Schäfer	Denmark	1 July 1995	30 June 1996	37	14	10	13	52	59	37.84	
Kim Brink	Denmark	1 July 1996	30 June 1997	43	17	14	12	53	52	39.53	1 Danish Cup
Kent Karlsson	Sweden	1 July 1997	23 September 1998	55	30	12	13	111	73	54.54	
Kim Brink*	Denmark	23 September 1998	31 December 1998	13	6	6	1	29	16	46.15	
Christian Andersen	Denmark	1 January 1999	16 March 1999	1	0	0	1	2	3	0.00	
Kim Brink†	Denmark	16 March 1999	30 June 2000	53	18	14	21	71	63	33.96	
Roy Hodgson	England	1 July 2000	30 June 2001	35	18	12	5	60	30	51.43	1 Superliga Championship
Kent Karlsson	Sweden	1 July 2001	30 August 2001	10	5	2	3	16	13	50.00	
Niels-Christian Holmstrøm*	Denmark	30 August 2001	17 September 2001	2	0	1	1	1	3	0.00	
Hans Backe	Sweden	17 September 2001	31 December 2005	199	110	56	33	336	179	55.28	2 Superliga Championships, 1 Danish Cup, 1 Royal League title
Ståle Solbakken	Norway	1 January 2006	31 May 2011	270	160	54	56	484	238	59.26	5 Superliga Championships, 1 Danish Cup, 2 Royal League titles
Roland Nilsson	Sweden	1 June 2011	8 January 2012	31	18	5	8	48	31	58.06	
Carsten V. Jensen	Denmark	9 January 2012	25 May 2012	18	9	6	3	29	14	50.00	1 Danish Cup
Ariël Jacobs	Belgium	22 June 2012	21 August 2013	51	24	16	11	82	52	47.06	1 Superliga Championship
Ståle Solbakken	Norway	21 August 2013	10 October 2020	357	203	77	77	633	363	56.86	3 Superliga Championships, 3 Danish Cups
Hjalte Nørregaard*	Denmark	10 October 2020	2 November 2020	3	2	0	1	6	4	66.67	
Jess Thorup	Denmark	2 November 2020	20 September 2022	14	8	4	2	25	20	57.14	1 Superliga Championship
Jacob Neestrup	Denmark	20 September 2022	29 March 2026	183	98	39	46	340	220	53.55	2 Superliga Championships, 2 Danish Cups
Bo Svensson	Denmark	29 March 2026		0	0	0	0	0	0	—	

Key
* Served as caretaker manager.
† Served as caretaker manager before being appointed permanently.
