= 1974–75 Ekstraklasa =

49th season of top-tier football league in Poland

I liga
- Season: 1974–75
- Dates: 17 August 1974 – 18 June 1975
- Champions: Ruch Chorzów (12th title)
- Relegated: Gwardia Warsaw; Arka Gdynia
- European Cup: Ruch Chorzów
- Cup Winners' Cup: Stal Rzeszów (II liga)
- UEFA Cup: Stal Mielec; Śląsk Wrocław
- Matches: 240
- Goals: 469 (1.95 per match)
- Top goalscorer: Grzegorz Lato (19 goals)
- Biggest home win: Ruch 6–0 Arka
- Biggest away win: Gwardia 0–6 Legia
- Highest scoring: Szombierki 5–2 ŁKS; Pogoń 5–2 Szombierki
- Highest attendance: 60,000
- Total attendance: 3,315,360
- Average attendance: 13,814 ▼0.9%

The 1974–75 I liga was the 49th season of the Polish Football Championship and the 41st season of the I liga, the top Polish professional league for association football clubs, since its establishment in 1927. The league was operated by the Polish Football Association (PZPN).

The defending champions were Ruch Chorzów, who won their 12th Polish title.

== Competition modus ==
The season started on 17 August 1974 and concluded on 18 June 1975 (autumn-spring league). The season was played as a round-robin tournament. The team at the top of the standings won the league title. A total of 16 teams participated, 14 of which competed in the league during the 1973–74 season, while the remaining two were promoted from the 1973–74 II liga. Each team played a total of 30 matches, half at home and half away, two games against each other team. Teams received two points for a win and one point for a draw.

== League table ==
Pos	Team	Pld	W	D	L	GF	GA	GD	Pts	Qualification or relegation
1	Ruch Chorzów (C)	30	20	4	6	61	27	+34	44	Qualification to European Cup first round
2	Stal Mielec	30	15	8	7	40	24	+16	38	Qualification to UEFA Cup first round
3	Śląsk Wrocław	30	13	10	7	40	31	+9	36	Qualification to UEFA Cup first round
4	Wisła Kraków	30	12	10	8	40	31	+9	34	
5	Zagłębie Sosnowiec	30	11	9	10	31	31	0	31	
6	Legia Warsaw	30	9	11	10	45	35	+10	29	
7	Górnik Zabrze	30	7	15	8	48	46	+2	29	
8	Polonia Bytom	30	6	16	8	25	31	−6	28	
9	Lech Poznań	30	10	8	12	31	43	−12	28	
10	GKS Tychy	30	8	11	11	34	38	−4	27	
11	Szombierki Bytom	30	7	12	11	43	45	−2	26	
12	Pogoń Szczecin	30	9	8	13	30	35	−5	26	
13	ŁKS Łódź	30	7	12	11	26	34	−8	26	
14	ROW Rybnik	30	7	12	11	24	35	−11	26	
15	Gwardia Warsaw (R)	30	8	10	12	25	38	−13	26	Relegated to II liga
16	Arka Gdynia (R)	30	8	10	12	26	45	−19	26	Relegated to II liga

Source: 90minut.pl (in Polish)
(C) Champions; (R) Relegated

== Results ==
Home \ Away	ARK	TYC	GÓR	GWA	LPO	LEG	ŁKS	POG	BYT	RYB	RUC	STA	SZB	ŚLĄ	WIS	ZSO
Arka Gdynia		1–0	0–0	2–1	2–1	0–0	1–0	1–1	3–1	0–0	1–0	0–2	0–0	1–2	1–1	1–0
GKS Tychy	1–1		1–1	3–2	1–1	2–1	0–0	3–0	3–0	3–1	0–2	0–2	1–1	3–1	2–2	0–1
Górnik Zabrze	3–0	4–1		1–1	3–0	0–5	0–0	4–1	1–1	1–1	1–1	1–2	1–1	2–2	3–2	2–2
Gwardia Warsaw	2–2	0–2	2–1		1–0	0–6	3–1	0–0	0–0	0–0	1–3	0–3	3–1	0–2	0–0	2–1
Lech Poznań	3–1	2–1	2–2	0–0		2–1	1–0	1–0	0–2	2–0	0–0	2–1	1–0	2–2	4–1	0–1
Legia Warsaw	4–2	1–1	2–1	0–0	4–2		2–0	1–1	2–2	0–1	1–2	0–1	3–1	1–1	2–1	0–0
ŁKS Łódź	2–0	1–1	2–1	2–0	3–0	2–1		1–0	1–1	0–0	1–2	1–0	2–2	1–1	0–2	1–1
Pogoń Szczecin	2–1	1–0	4–1	0–0	2–1	1–0	1–1		0–1	5–0	0–1	0–2	5–2	0–1	1–1	2–0
Polonia Bytom	4–0	1–1	0–0	1–0	0–0	1–1	0–0	2–0		0–0	1–1	0–1	0–3	0–0	1–1	1–0
ROW Rybnik	2–0	0–0	0–3	0–1	1–1	1–1	0–0	2–0	1–0		2–1	3–1	3–0	1–3	0–0	2–2
Ruch Chorzów	6–0	4–0	3–1	1–4	5–0	2–0	3–1	2–1	4–0	3–1		2–1	3–1	1–1	3–2	1–0
Stal Mielec	2–1	0–1	2–2	1–0	2–2	3–1	0–0	1–1	1–1	1–0	1–0		0–1	1–1	0–1	3–0
Szombierki Bytom	1–1	1–0	2–2	3–0	3–0	3–3	5–2	0–0	1–1	2–2	1–2	1–3		4–1	0–1	1–2
Śląsk Wrocław	1–1	3–1	3–1	1–2	0–1	0–0	1–0	2–0	3–1	2–0	0–1	1–2	1–0		2–0	2–1
Wisła Kraków	2–0	1–1	0–2	0–0	2–0	2–0	3–1	3–0	2–1	2–0	2–1	1–1	1–1	3–0		0–2
Zagłębie Sosnowiec	1–2	2–1	3–3	1–0	2–0	0–2	2–0	0–1	1–1	1–0	2–1	0–0	1–1	0–0	2–1	

Source: 90minut.pl (in Polish)
Legend: Blue = home team win; Yellow = draw; Red = away team win.

== Top goalscorers ==
Rank	Player	Club	Goals
1	(Poland) Grzegorz Lato	Stal Mielec	19
2	(Poland) Kazimierz Kmiecik	Wisła Kraków	15
2	(Poland) Joachim Marx	Ruch Chorzów	15
4	(Poland) Leszek Wolski	Pogoń Szczecin	14
5	(Poland) Jan Domarski	Stal Mielec	13
5	(Poland) Jerzy Radecki	Polonia Bytom	13
5	(Poland) Andrzej Szarmach	Górnik Zabrze	13
5	(Poland) Bronisław Bula	Ruch Chorzów	13
9	(Poland) Roman Jakóbczak	Lech Poznań	12
10	(Poland) Zdzisław Kapka	Wisła Kraków	11
10	(Poland) Eugeniusz Nagiel	Szombierki Bytom	11
10	(Poland) Władysław Dąbrowski	Legia Warsaw	11

== Attendances ==
#	Club	Average
1	Lech Poznań	32,333
2	ŁKS	19,333
3	Wisła Kraków	17,867
4	Pogoń Szczecin	16,733
5	Arka Gdynia	15,800
6	Śląsk Wrocław	15,600
7	Ruch Chorzów	14,800
8	Legia Warszawa	14,733
9	Tychy	14,667
10	Stal Mielec	14,200
11	Zagłębie Sosnowiec	10,800
12	Górnik Zabrze	9,920
13	Polonia Bytom	7,533
14	ROW	6,000
15	Szombierki Bytom	5,700
16	Gwardia Warszawa	5,000

== Bibliography ==
- Gowarzewski, Andrzej (2000). Encyklopedia Piłkarska Fuji. Liga Polska. O tytuł mistrza Polski 1920–2000 (in Polish). GiA, Katowice. ISBN 83-88232-02-9.
