= Józef Kopicera =

Polish footballer

Personal information
- Date of birth: 16 February 1951 (age 75)
- Place of birth: Gliwice, Poland
- Height: 1.80 m (5 ft 11 in)
- Positions: Midfielder; forward

Senior career*
Years	Team	Apps	(Gls)
–1971	Piast Gliwice		
1971–1977	Ruch Chorzów	129	(25)
1977–1979	BKS Stal Bielsko-Biała		
1979–1981	Polonia Bytom		
1981–1984	Arras		
1984–1985	ŁTS Łabędy		

International career
1974	Poland	2	(0)
- * Club domestic league appearances and goals

Józef Kopicera (born 16 February 1951) is a Polish former footballer.

He made two appearances for the Poland national team in 1974.

== Honours ==
Ruch Chorzów

- Ekstraklasa: 1973–74, 1974–75
- Polish Cup: 1973–74
