= 1972–73 Belgian First Division =

70th season of top-tier football in Belgium

Belgian First Division
- Season: 1972–73

Statistics of Belgian First Division in the 1972–73 season for association football clubs in Belgium.

== Overview ==
Location of teams in Belgian First Division 1972–73

It was contested by 16 teams, and Club Brugge K.V. won the championship.

== League standings ==
Pos	Team	Pld	W	D	L	GF	GA	GD	Pts	Qualification or relegation
1	Club Brugge K.V.	30	17	11	2	53	26	+27	45	Qualified for 1973–74 European Cup
2	Standard Liège	30	12	14	4	45	25	+20	38	Qualified for 1973–74 UEFA Cup
3	Racing White	30	10	17	3	45	19	+26	37	Qualified for 1973–74 UEFA Cup
4	Beerschot	30	14	8	8	40	33	+7	36	Qualified for 1973–74 UEFA Cup
5	KV Mechelen	30	10	16	4	37	28	+9	36	
6	R.S.C. Anderlecht	30	12	10	8	47	30	+17	34	Qualified for 1973–74 European Cup Winners' Cup
7	Royal Antwerp FC	30	13	5	12	43	38	+5	31	
8	K Berchem Sport	30	11	9	10	28	28	0	31	
9	Lierse S.K.	30	10	11	9	43	43	0	31	
10	R.F.C. de Liège	30	9	11	10	34	35	−1	29	
11	Cercle Brugge K.S.V.	30	9	10	11	33	44	−11	28	
12	Beringen FC	30	8	10	12	28	39	−11	26	
13	K. Sint-Truidense V.V.	30	6	13	11	31	41	−10	25	
14	KFC Diest	30	8	5	17	30	51	−21	21	
15	Royale Union Saint-Gilloise	30	4	11	15	17	38	−21	19	Relegated to Division II
16	Crossing Club Schaerbeek	30	3	7	20	20	56	−36	13	Relegated to Division II

== Results ==
Home \ Away	AND	ANT	BEE	BRC	BER	CER	CLU	CRO	DIE	FCL	LIE	MEC	RRW	STA	STV	USG
Anderlecht		2–2	3–0	3–1	2–0	1–0	1–1	2–1	4–0	1–1	0–0	1–1	0–0	3–2	1–1	2–0
Antwerp	2–1		1–1	1–0	3–1	3–0	0–1	3–1	2–0	1–1	4–1	1–1	0–1	1–0	4–2	4–0
Beerschot	2–3	2–1		3–0	1–0	4–0	2–1	1–0	1–0	1–2	1–0	1–2	1–1	0–1	3–1	1–1
Berchem	2–1	1–0	1–2		2–0	0–0	1–1	3–0	2–1	1–1	0–0	0–0	2–1	0–1	1–0	2–0
Beringen	2–5	2–0	0–0	1–0		0–4	2–2	1–0	2–0	2–1	0–0	1–2	0–0	0–0	0–0	2–1
Cercle Brugge	1–2	2–1	1–2	1–1	3–1		0–5	2–1	0–2	2–1	0–2	2–3	1–1	2–2	1–0	3–0
Club Brugge	2–0	2–1	0–0	1–1	1–0	2–2		2–0	3–1	3–1	1–0	3–2	1–1	2–2	4–3	3–0
Crossing Schaerbeek	1–6	2–3	1–1	2–1	1–3	0–0	1–3		3–1	0–0	0–6	0–3	1–1	1–2	0–0	0–0
Diest	0–0	2–0	1–3	0–1	3–3	0–1	2–0	2–1		2–3	2–2	1–1	0–3	2–2	3–2	2–0
Liège	1–0	4–1	1–0	0–1	0–2	1–1	0–1	1–0	1–0		3–2	1–1	0–3	0–1	2–2	1–0
Lierse	2–1	1–1	4–3	1–1	3–2	3–1	1–2	1–0	2–0	0–3		1–1	1–5	1–1	1–2	1–0
Mechelen	1–0	2–0	0–0	1–0	1–1	1–1	0–0	0–1	0–1	2–2	4–1		1–1	2–2	1–1	1–0
Racing White	0–0	3–0	0–1	2–0	0–0	4–0	1–1	4–0	4–0	0–0	3–3	0–0		1–1	3–0	1–3
Standard Liège	0–0	2–0	6–0	1–2	2–0	0–1	1–1	3–1	3–0	1–0	0–0	3–0	1–1		1–0	1–1
Sint-Truiden	3–2	0–1	0–2	2–0	0–0	0–0	0–2	2–1	2–1	2–1	2–2	2–2	1–1	1–1		0–0
Union SG	1–0	0–2	1–1	1–1	2–0	1–1	0–2	1–0	0–1	2–2	0–1	0–1	0–0	2–2	0–0	

Legend: Blue = home team win; Yellow = draw; Red = away team win.
