= Jan Benigier =

Polish footballer (born 1950)

Personal information
- Full name: Jan Janusz Benigier
- Date of birth: 18 February 1950 (age 76)
- Place of birth: Radom, Poland
- Height: 1.75 m (5 ft 9 in)
- Position: Forward

Youth career
- 1965: Czarni Radomsko
- 1966: Hala Sportowa Łódź

Senior career*
Years	Team	Apps	(Gls)
1967–1969	Start Łódź		
1970–1972	Zawisza Bydgoszcz		
1972–1980	Ruch Chorzów	204	(69)
1980–1982	RFC Seraing		
1982–1983	Ruch Chorzów	25	(5)
1983–1986	Polonia Bytom		

International career
1976	Poland	4	(0)
Medal record
Men's football
Representing Poland
Olympic Games
Silver medal – second place	1976 Montreal	Team
- * Club domestic league appearances and goals

Jan Janusz Benigier (born 18 February 1950) is a Polish former professional footballer who played as a forward.

He competed in the men's tournament at the 1976 Summer Olympics in Montreal. He won 3 national titles (1974, 1975 and 1979) and 1 national cup (1974) with Ruch Chorzów.

== Honours ==
Ruch Chorzów

- Ekstraklasa: 1973–74, 1974–75, 1978–79
- Polish Cup: 1973–74

Poland

- Olympic silver medal: 1976
