= Joachim Marx =

Polish footballer (born 1944)

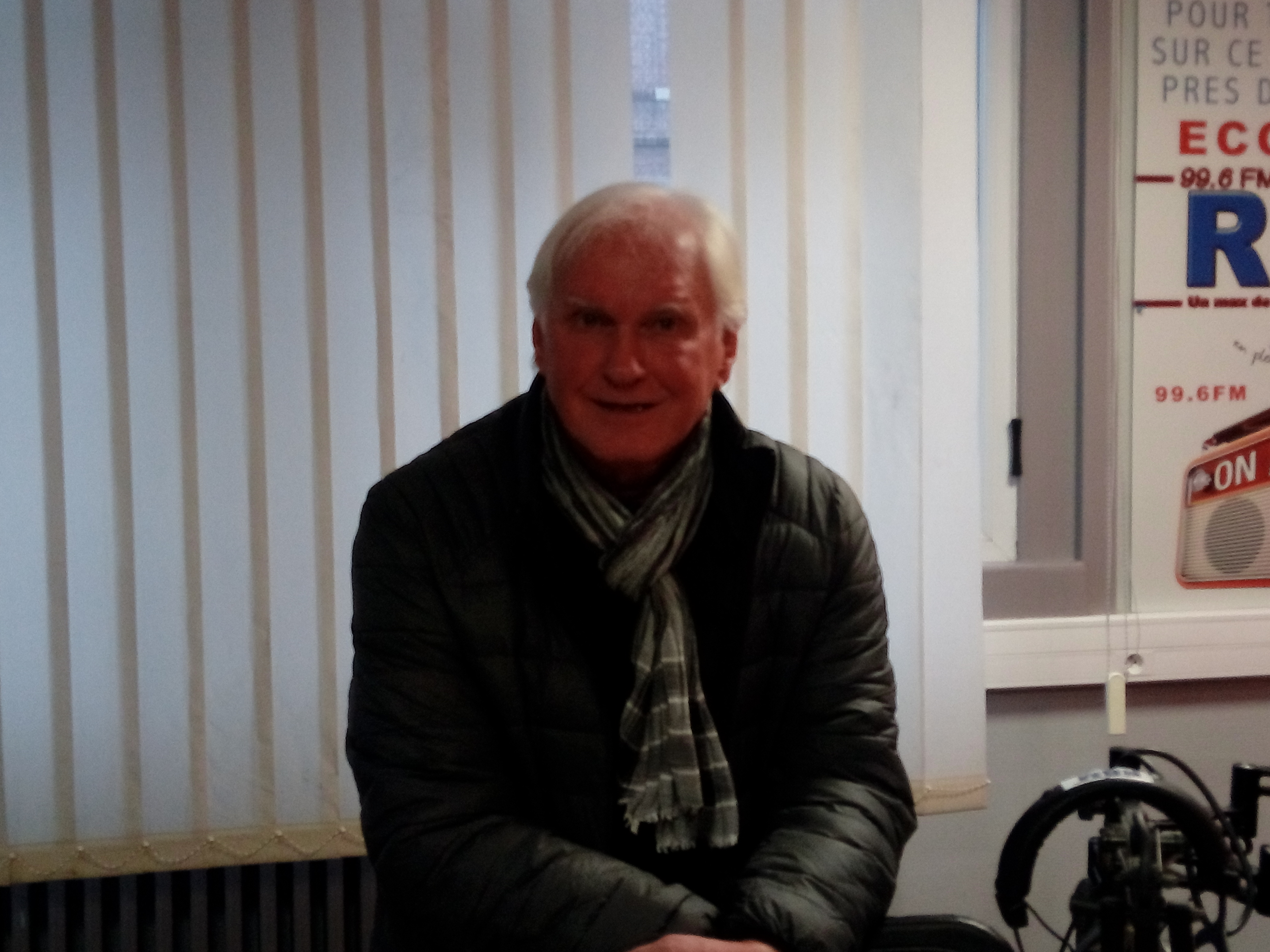
- Marx in 2017

Personal information
- Full name: Joachim Jerzy Marx
- Date of birth: 31 August 1944 (age 82)
- Place of birth: Gleiwitz, Germany (present-day Poland)
- Height: 1.80 m (5 ft 11 in)
- Position: Striker

Youth career
- GKS Sośnica

Senior career*
Years	Team	Apps	(Gls)
1959–1963	GKS Gliwice		
1963–1969	Gwardia Warsaw	82	(36)
1969–1975	Ruch Chorzów	162	(66)
1975–1979	Lens		
1979–1982	Nœux-les-Mines		

International career
1966–1975	Poland	23	(10)

Managerial career
- 1985–1988: Lens
- 1988–1990: La Roche VF
- 1991–1992: Châteauroux
Medal record
Men's football
Representing Poland
Olympic Games
Gold medal – first place	1972 Munich	Team
- * Club domestic league appearances and goals

Joachim Jerzy Marx (born 31 August 1944) is a Polish former professional footballer who played as a striker. Besides Poland, he has played in France.

At international level, he played for Poland national team, scoring 10 goals in 23 appearances, and was a participant at the 1972 Summer Olympics, where his team won the gold medal.

With Ruch Chorzów, he played 162 matches in the Ekstraklasa scoring 66 goals. With Marx, Ruch won the national championship (1974 and 1975), and the Polish Cup (1974).

Later in his career, Marx went to France, where he played most notably for RC Lens (second place in Ligue 1 in 1977). Since ending his professional career in 1982, Marx worked as a coach in France.

Marx was famed for the power of his shot.

== Career statistics ==
Appearances and goals by national team and year
National team	Year	Apps	Goals
Poland	1966	1	0
Poland	1967	0	0
Poland	1968	0	0
Poland	1969	3	2
Poland	1970	5	3
Poland	1971	2	0
Poland	1972	5	1
Poland	1973	0	0
Poland	1974	1	0
Poland	1975	6	4
Total		23	10

== Honours ==
Ruch Chorzów

- Ekstraklasa: 1973–74, 1974–75
- Polish Cup: 1973–74

Poland

- Olympic gold medal: 1972
