= Bronisław Bula =

Polish footballer (born 1946)

Personal information
- Full name: Bronisław Ryszard Bula
- Date of birth: 28 September 1946 (age 80)
- Place of birth: Kochłowice, Poland
- Height: 1.67 m (5 ft 6 in)
- Position: Midfielder

Senior career*
Years	Team	Apps	(Gls)
1961–1978	Ruch Chorzów	318	(81)
1978–1983	FC Rouen		
1983–1985	Arras Football		

International career
1968–1975	Poland	26	(5)
- * Club domestic league appearances and goals

Bronisław Ryszard Bula (born 28 September 1946) is a Polish former footballer who played as a midfielder. He played 26 times for the Poland national team, scoring five goals.

== Honours ==
Ruch Chorzów

- Ekstraklasa: 1967–68, 1973–74, 1974–75
