= Dieter Brei =

German footballer

Personal information
- Date of birth: 30 September 1950 (age 76)
- Place of birth: Verl, West Germany
- Position: Midfielder

Senior career*
Years	Team	Apps	(Gls)
1970–1972	Arminia Bielefeld	43	(3)
1972–1981	Fortuna Düsseldorf	221	(30)

Managerial career
- 1985–1987: Fortuna Düsseldorf
- 1997: Rot-Weiss Essen
- 1998: FC Gütersloh
- 2002–2003: SC Verl
- 2007–2008: SC Wiedenbrück 2000
- * Club domestic league appearances and goals

Dieter Brei (30 September 1950) is a former German footballer, now a football trainer.

== Biography ==
Brei was born in Verl near Bielefeld in North Rhine-Westphalia. He began his football career in the early days of black and white television broadcasting. In 1970, he transferred to Arminia Bielefeld in the Bundesliga, where he played in 43 games and scored three goals.

After the team's relegation in 1972, he transferred to Fortuna Düsseldorf where he continued his playing career, scoring 30 goals in 221 games, until injuries forced him to retire in 1981. During this time he won as a member of the winning Fortuna team the DFB-Pokal in the years 1979 and 1980. Overall as a defensive and midfield player he played in 264 Bundesliga games, in which he scored 33 goals.

In 1974, Brei made his only appearance at national level, in the German B team, when he was put on as a substitute in Kiel against Sweden. The high point, and simultaneously the low point, of his career was the final of the European Cup Winners' Cup of 16 May 1979, in which Fortuna Düsseldorf lost 3–4 to FC Barcelona after extra time. Brei had to be substituted after only 25 minutes because of a knee injury, which despite two operations signalled the end of his playing career.

Fortuna Düsseldorf was Brei's first post as a trainer in the Bundesliga from 1985 to 1987. In the 1990s he trained Rot-Weiss Essen in the 2. Bundesliga and the Regionalliga, FC Gütersloh in the 2. Bundesliga, and SC Verl in the Regionalliga and the Amateur-Oberliga. Between October 2007 and June 2008 he trained the Oberliga team SC Wiedenbrück 2000.
