= 1972 Danish 1st Division =

27th season of Danish 1st Division

Danish 1st Division
- Season: 1972

Statistics of Danish 1st Division in the 1972 season.

== Overview ==
It was contested by 12 teams, and Vejle Boldklub won the championship.

== League standings ==
Pos	Team	Pld	W	D	L	GF	GA	GD	Pts
1	Vejle Boldklub	22	16	1	5	65	33	+32	33
2	Boldklubben 1903	22	11	5	6	43	32	+11	27
3	Næstved IF	22	9	8	5	43	41	+2	26
4	B 1901	22	11	1	10	52	39	+13	23
5	Randers Sportsklub Freja	22	10	3	9	39	35	+4	23
6	Hvidovre IF	22	10	2	10	33	31	+2	22
7	Boldklubben Frem	22	9	3	10	45	47	−2	21
8	Aarhus Gymnastikforening	22	8	5	9	28	40	−12	21
9	Køge BK	22	6	8	8	30	37	−7	20
10	Kjøbenhavns Boldklub	22	6	5	11	26	39	−13	17
11	Brønshøj BK	22	6	4	12	29	49	−20	16
12	Boldklubben 1909	22	5	5	12	35	45	−10	15

== Results ==
Home \ Away	AGF	B01	B03	B09	BBK	BKF	HIF	KB	KBK	NIF	RSF	VBK
Aarhus GF	—	1–2	0–3	2–1	4–2	2–1	1–3	1–0	1–0	2–1	2–2	1–2
B 1901	6–2	—	0–1	1–0	3–1	2–2	2–1	2–3	1–0	3–0	2–3	1–2
B 1903	1–1	1–0	—	4–1	0–0	3–4	4–0	2–4	1–2	2–2	1–1	4–2
B 1909	1–1	7–3	0–1	—	0–3	2–1	1–2	2–1	2–2	3–3	5–2	2–3
Brønshøj BK	3–1	1–6	1–4	1–3	—	6–3	1–0	1–0	1–1	2–2	1–4	1–3
BK Frem	1–2	1–4	3–2	4–2	3–1	—	1–3	0–0	4–1	1–1	3–1	3–1
Hvidovre IF	0–0	2–1	1–1	3–1	3–1	1–2	—	1–0	2–0	1–2	0–1	1–6
Kjøbenhavns BK	0–1	1–6	2–1	1–1	1–0	2–1	1–0	—	0–2	1–2	3–5	1–4
Køge BK	4–1	4–3	1–2	0–0	0–0	0–4	2–1	1–1	—	3–3	1–2	0–3
Næstved BK	1–1	3–1	2–3	1–0	3–1	4–2	1–0	1–1	3–3	—	5–3	0–2
Randers Freja	2–1	2–1	0–1	1–0	0–1	5–0	1–3	1–1	0–1	0–1	—	3–1
Vejle BK	4–0	1–2	5–1	5–1	5–0	2–1	1–5	4–2	2–2	6–2	1–0	—

Legend: Blue = home team win; Yellow = draw; Red = away team win.
