= Theo de Jong =

Dutch footballer born (born 11 August 1947)

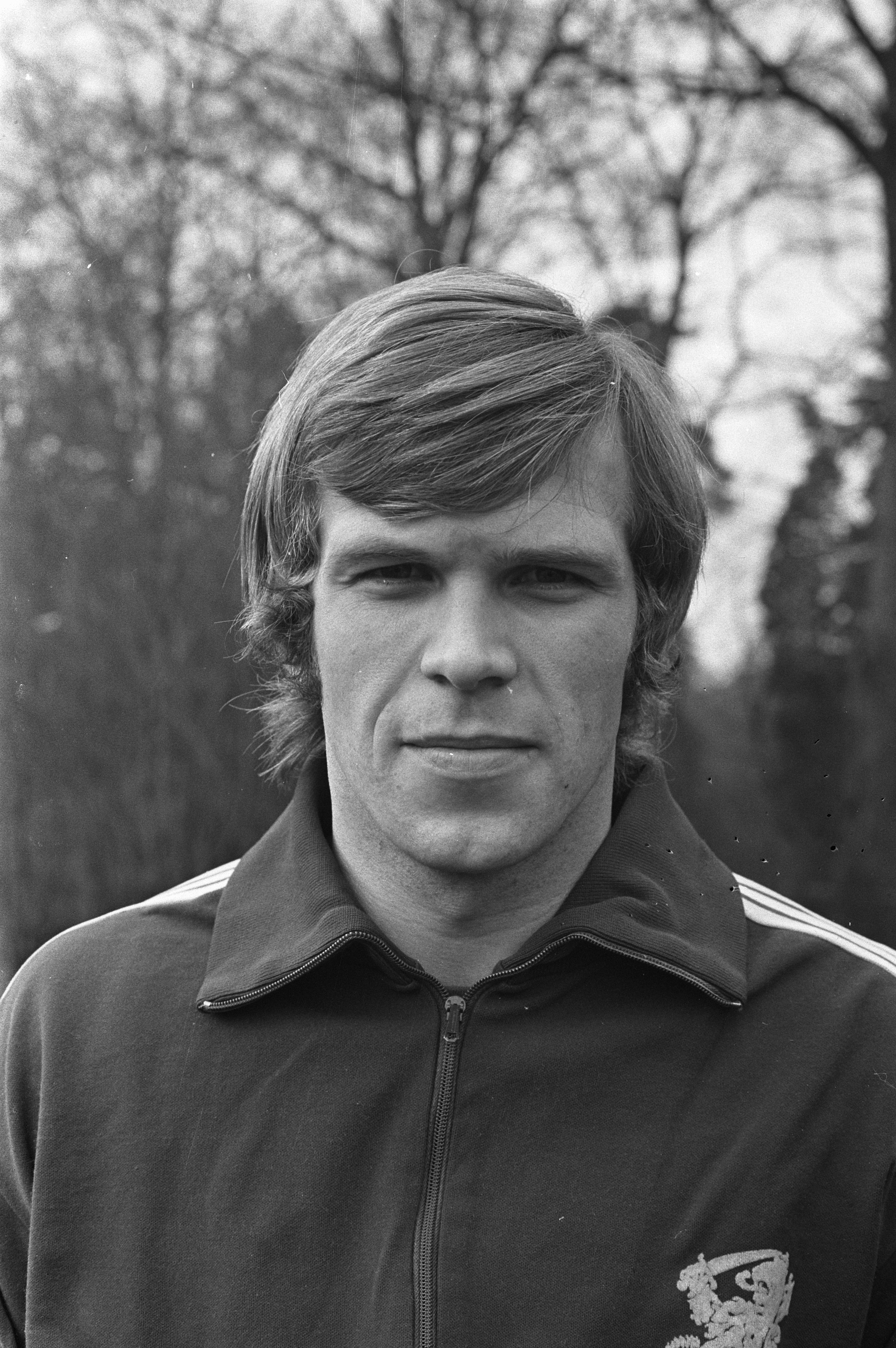
- De Jong in 1972

Personal information
- Full name: Theodorus Jacob de Jong
- Date of birth: 11 August 1947 (age 79)
- Place of birth: Leeuwarden, Netherlands
- Position: Midfielder

Senior career*
Years	Team	Apps	(Gls)
1966–1970	Blauw Wit		
1970–1972	NEC	57	(17)
1972–1977	Feyenoord	163	(61)
1977–1981	Roda JC	125	(44)
1981–1983	Seiko	54	(15)
1983–1984	FC Den Bosch	28	(4)

International career
1972–1974	Netherlands	15	(3)

Managerial career
- 1986–1989: FC Den Bosch
- 1989–1992: FC Zwolle
- 1992–1993: Cambuur
- 1995–1996: Willem II
- 2001–2002: Go Ahead Eagles
- 2002–2004: China (assistant)
- 2006: Pirouzi (assistant)
- 2006–2007: Cameroon (assistant)
- 2007: Esteghlal (assistant)
- 2007: Steel Azin
- 2010: Willem II
- 2016: Ikorodu United
Medal record
Men's football
Representing Netherlands
FIFA World Cup
Runner-up	1974 West Germany
- * Club domestic league appearances and goals

Theodorus Jacob de Jong (born 11 August 1947) is a Dutch former professional footballer and former football coach.

During his career, he played for NEC Nijmegen and Feyenoord Rotterdam. He earned 15 caps and scored 3 goals for the Netherlands national team and played for them in the 1974 FIFA World Cup Final.

De Jong was a member of the Feyenoord team that won the UEFA Cup in 1974, beating Tottenham Hotspur in the then two-legged final. He later played three seasons in Hong Kong for Seiko.

His son, Dave de Jong, was also a professional footballer.

== Career statistics ==
=== International ===
Appearances and goals by national team and year
National team	Year	Apps	Goals
Netherlands	1972	4	1
Netherlands	1973	2	1
Netherlands	1974	9	1
Total		15	3

Scores and results list the Netherlands' goal tally first, score column indicates score after each De Jong goal.

List of international goals scored by Theo de Jong
No.	Date	Venue	Opponent	Score	Result	Competition
1	1 November 1972	De Kuip, Rotterdam, Netherlands	Norway	5–0	9–0	1974 FIFA World Cup qualification
2	10 October 1973	De Kuip, Rotterdam, Netherlands	Poland	1–0	1–1	Friendly
3	23 June 1974	Westfalenstadion, Dortmund, Germany	Bulgaria	4–1	4–1	1974 FIFA World Cup
