= Georgi Vasilev (footballer, born 1945) =

Bulgarian footballer

Gocho Vasilev
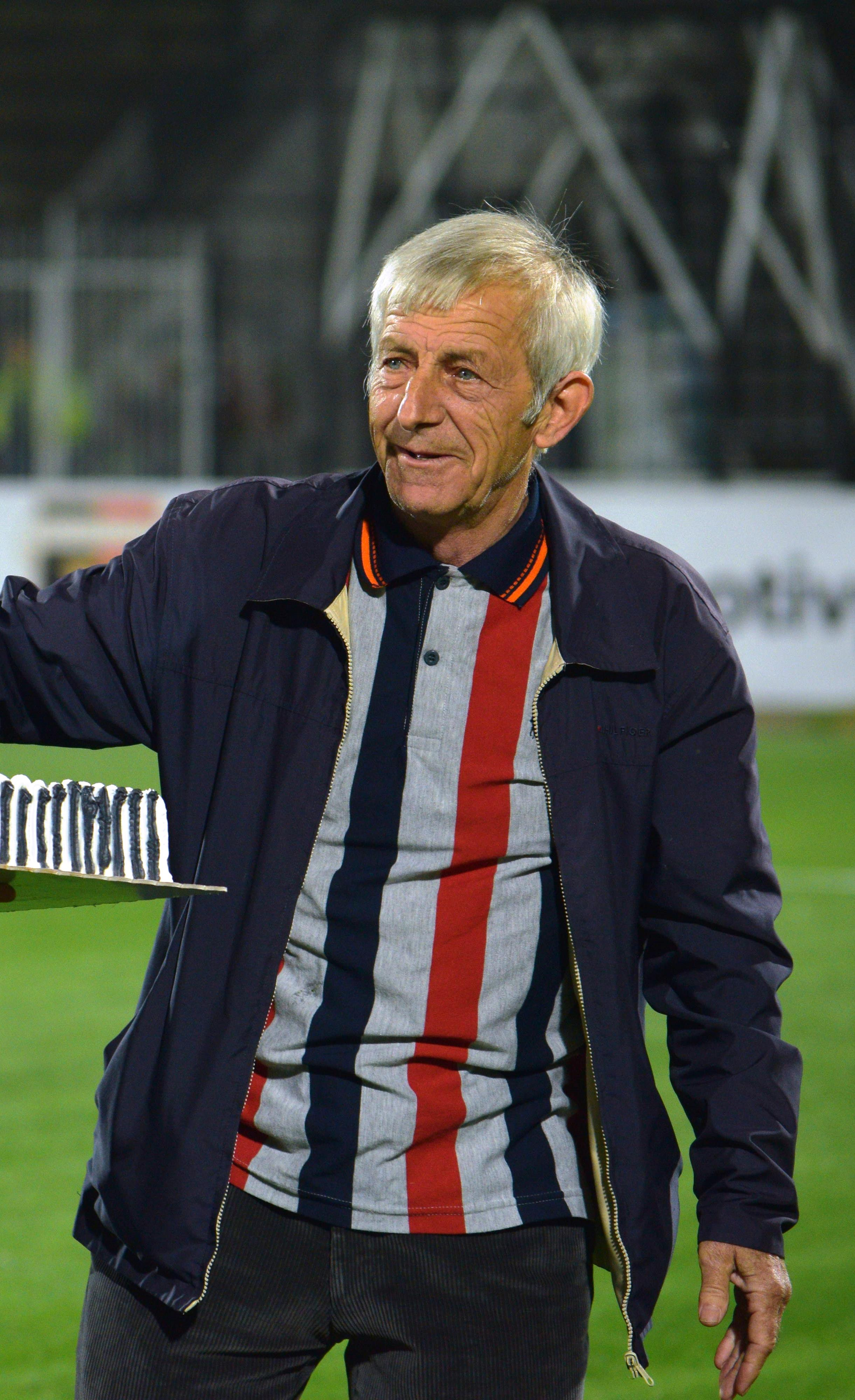

Personal information
- Full name: Georgi Parvanov Vasilev
- Date of birth: 9 June 1945 (age 81)
- Place of birth: Sidirokastro, Greece
- Height: 1.72 m (5 ft 7 1/2 in)
- Position: Forward

Youth career
- 1955–1962: Pirin Gotse Delchev

Senior career*
Years	Team	Apps	(Gls)
1962–1963	Pirin Gotse Delchev		
1963–1979	Lokomotiv Plovdiv	386	(115)
1980–1986	Pirin Gotse Delchev		

International career
1968–1973	Bulgaria	17	(4)
- * Club domestic league appearances and goals

Olympic medal record

Representing Bulgaria

Men's football
Silver medal – second place	1968 Mexico City	Team competition

Georgi Parvanov Vasilev (Bulgarian: Георги Първанов Василев; born 9 June 1945), also known as "Gocho" (Bulgarian: Гочо), is a Bulgarian former footballer who played as a forward. In his career, he played for Lokomotiv Plovdiv and Pirin Gotse Delchev.

== Career ==
He started practicing football in 1959 in Gotse Delchev. Until 1963 he played for the team of Pirin Gotse Delchev, and after that, he was transferred to Lokomotiv Plovdiv and wore the shirt of the club until 1980. He returned to Pirin Gotse Delchev, where he played until 1986 and became the top scorer of the B group at the age of 42.

Vasilev has played in 386 games and has scored 115 goals in the A group for Lokomotiv Plovdiv. He has played 28 games and has scored 12 goals in the UEFA Cup with the Smurfs, of which he is also an international top scorer. Georgi Vasilev is a vice-champion of Bulgaria for 1973, with two more bronze medals won - in 1969 and 1974 with Lokomotiv Plovdiv. He has awarded "Honorary sign of the city of Plovdiv" in 2019.

Georgi Vasilev is the only Olympic medalist in football from Plovdiv, who won silver medal in Mexico City, Mexico, in 1968.

He has played in 17 games and has scored 10 goals for the national team of Bulgaria, and for the youth team he has 6 games and 6 goals. He played for Bulgaria national football team at the 1968 Summer Olympics.
