= Benny Johansen =

Danish footballer and manager (born 1949)

Personal information
- Full name: Benny Johansen
- Date of birth: 18 March 1949 (age 77)
- Place of birth: Aarhus, Denmark

Youth career
- Ryvang FC

Senior career*
Years	Team	Apps	(Gls)
1968–1972	B 1903		
1973–1977	Helsingborgs IF		
1978–1980	B 1903		
1981–1982	Hillerød G&IF		

International career
1972	Denmark U21	1	(0)

Managerial career
- 1981–1982: Hillerød G&IF (player coach)
- 1983–1984: Espergærde IF
- 1990–1991: B 1903
- 1992–1994: Copenhagen
- 1994–1995: Copenhagen
- 1995–1997: Al-Rayyan
- 1997–1999: Køge
- 1999–2002: Silkeborg
- 2002–2004: Ølstykke
- 2004–2006: Fremad Amager
- 2008–2011: Fredensborg BI
- * Club domestic league appearances and goals

Benny Johansen (born 18 March 1949) is a Danish former football player and manager. He won the Danish championship twice as a player for B 1903 and once as a manager of FC Copenhagen. He played one game for the Denmark national under-21 football team in 1972.

== Clubs ==
=== Playing career ===
Johansen played his youth football for amateur club Ryvang FC, before making his senior debut for B 1903 in 1968. With B 1903, he won the 1969 and 1970 Danish football championship. Johansen scored both goals in B 1903's 2-1 win against Celtic FC in the 1971-72 European Cup, though B 1903 was eliminated 4-2 on aggregate. In 1972, Johansen moved abroad to play for Swedish club Helsingborgs IF. He moved back to B 1903 in 1978, but suffered a knee injury, and ended his playing career in 1980.

=== Coaching career ===
Johansen started his coaching career with amateur team Hillerød G&IF, playing the lower regional levels, SBU Series 1, as player coach from 1981 to 1982, and Espergærde IF from 1983 and 1984. In 1988, Johansen was back at B 1903, coaching the youth team. In 1989, he became B 1903 assistant manager. He became manager of B 1903 in 1990, and led the team to the quarter-finals of the 1991-92 UEFA Cup, beating Aberdeen, Bayern Munich, and Trabzonspor, before being eliminated by Torino Calcio. In 1992, Johansen became the first coach of F.C. Copenhagen, a newly created fusion of B 1903 and KB, and guided the team to the 1992 Danish Superliga championship. In 1994, Keld Kristensen was named manager of FC Copenhagen, before Johansen managed the club again from 1994 to 1995.

In 1995, Johansen moved abroad to coach Al-Rayyan in Qatar. He was recommended to the club by his predecessor and compatriot Jørgen E. Larsen. In 1997, he moved back to Denmark to coach Køge Boldklub. In 1999, he took over as manager of Silkeborg, and led the club to the 2001 Danish Cup in May 2001. In October 2001, Johansen was fired by Silkeborg and replaced by Morten Bruun. From the summer of 2002 to September 2004, he was manager of Ølstykke FC. He moved directly on to manage Fremad Amager. In October 2006 he was named sports director of Fremad Amager, but left the job in March 2007 in order to continue his managerial career. He went on to coach on an amateur team.

== Honours ==
- Danish Championship: 1969, 1970, 1992
- Danish Cup: 1991, 2001
