= Chris McGrath (footballer) =

Northern Irish footballer (born 1954)

Personal information
- Full name: Christopher Roland McGrath
- Date of birth: 29 November 1954 (age 71)
- Place of birth: Belfast, Northern Ireland
- Height: 5 ft 9 in (1.75 m)
- Position: Winger

Senior career*
Years	Team	Apps	(Gls)
1972–1975	Tottenham Hotspur	38	(5)
1975–1976	→ Millwall (loan)	15	(3)
1976–1981	Manchester United	28	(1)
1981–1982	Tulsa Roughnecks	44	(3)
1982–1985	South China	45	(15)

International career
1974–1979	Northern Ireland	21	(4)
- * Club domestic league appearances and goals

Christopher Roland McGrath (born 29 November 1954) is a Northern Irish former professional footballer who played as a winger for Tottenham Hotspur, Millwall, Manchester United and Tulsa Roughnecks, and as an international for Northern Ireland.

== Club career ==
McGrath was born in Belfast, Northern Ireland. He joined Tottenham Hotspur as an apprentice in January 1972. Making his first class debut in 1973 and going on to make 46 appearances in all competitions including nine as substitute and scoring ten goals. McGrath featured in both legs of the 1974 UEFA Cup Final and collected a runner's up medal. In 1975, he joined Millwall in a loan deal where he made 15 appearances and scoring on 3 occasions. He transferred to Manchester United for £30,000 in October 1976 where he made 38 appearances and scoring once. McGrath left the club in February 1981 to join Tulsa Roughnecks in the NASL where he played to 1982.

== International career ==
McGrath represented Northern Ireland 21 times and scoring on four occasions.

His first international appearance was against Scotland on 11 May 1974, his last versus England on 19 May 1979.
