= Peter Ressel =

Dutch footballer

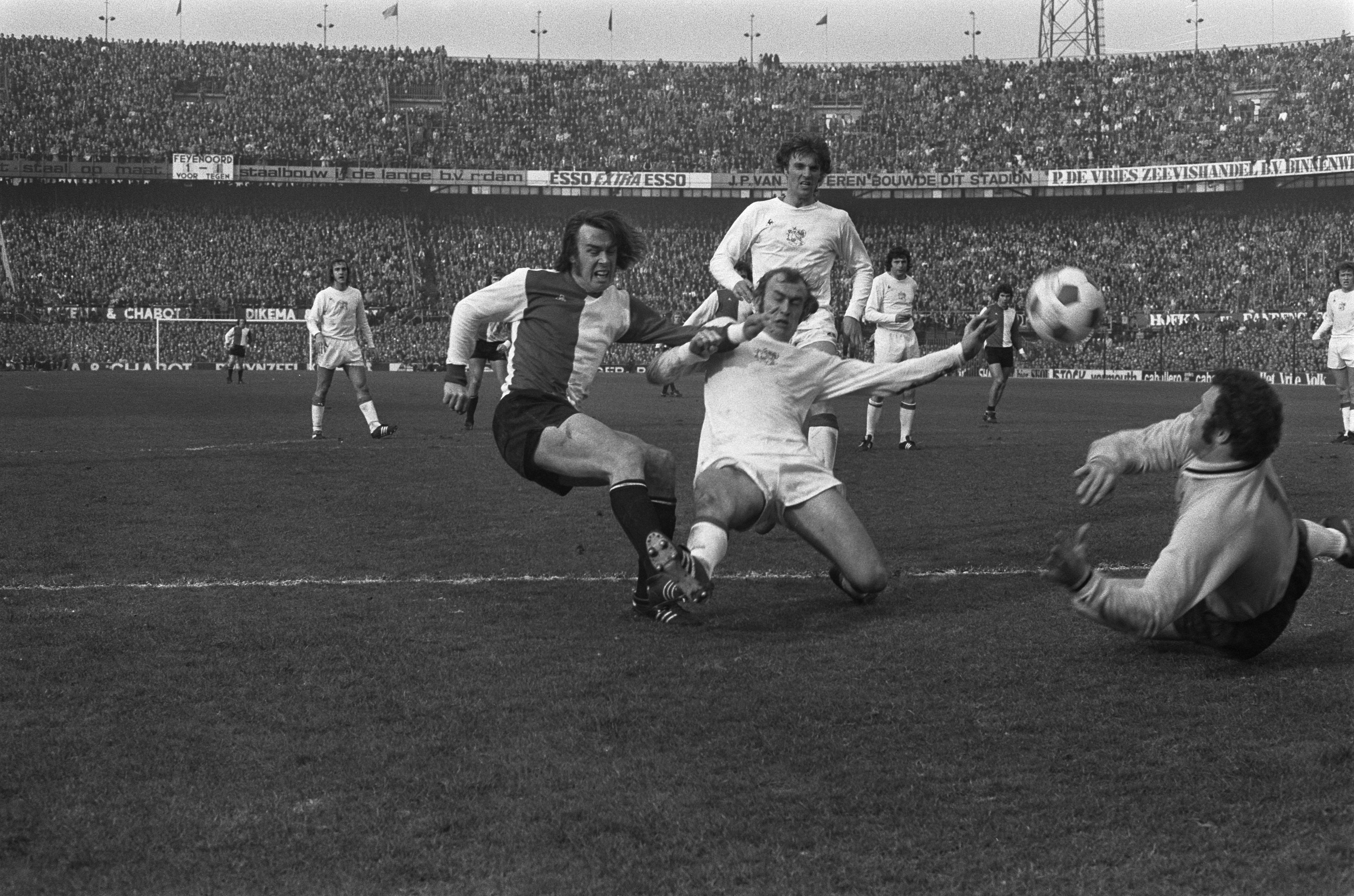
- Peter Ressel (left)

Personal information
- Full name: Peter Helmut Ressel
- Date of birth: 4 December 1945 (age 80)
- Place of birth: Krommenie, Netherlands
- Position: Winger

Youth career
- Apeldoornse Boys

Senior career*
Years	Team	Apps	(Gls)
1965–1968	Go Ahead Eagles	90	(13)
1968–1969	NEC Nijmegen	34	(6)
1969–1970	PSV Eindhoven	27	(6)
1970–1972	Lierse SK	53	(19)
1972–1975	Feyenoord	97	(43)
1975–1978	RSC Anderlecht	88	(14)
1978	San Jose Earthquakes	28	(8)
1978–1979	AZ'67	19	(4)
1979	Chicago Sting	59	(18)
1979	KSC Hasselt	8	(2)
1979–1980	Telstar	8	(2)
1980–1983	FC VVV	91	(24)
Total		602	(159)

International career
1974	Netherlands	3	(0)
- * Club domestic league appearances and goals

Peter Helmut Ressel (born 4 December 1945 in Krommenie, North Holland) is a retired football winger from the Netherlands, who obtained three caps for the Netherlands national team. He won the UEFA Cup with Feyenoord Rotterdam in 1974 by defeating Tottenham Hotspur, scoring the second goal in the 84th minute of the second leg to make the score 2–0, which secured Feyenoord's win. He also won the 1976 Cup-Winners Cup, 1976 European Super Cup and 1978 Cup-Winners Cup with RSC Anderlecht.

Ressel started his professional career for Go Ahead Eagles, then moved to NEC Nijmegen, PSV Eindhoven, Lierse SK (Belgium), Feyenoord Rotterdam, RSC Anderlecht 1975–1978 (Belgium), San Jose Earthquakes (USA), AZ'67, Chicago Sting, KSC Hasselt, Telstar and FC VVV. He retired from professional football in the 1983–1984 season.

== Honours ==
=== Player ===
Feyenoord

- Eredivisie: 1973–74
- UEFA Cup: 1974
- Intertoto Cup: 1973

RSC Anderlecht

- Belgian Cup: 1975-76
- European Cup Winners' Cup: 1975–76 (winners), 1976-77 (runners-up), 1977–78 (winners)
- European Super Cup: 1976
- Amsterdam Tournament: 1976
- Tournoi de Paris: 1977
- Jules Pappaert Cup: 1977
- Belgian Sports Merit Award: 1978
