= 1973–74 Ekstraklasa =

48th season of top-tier football league in Poland

I liga
- Season: 1973–74
- Dates: 25 August 1973 – 7 August 1974
- Champions: Ruch Chorzów (11th title)
- Relegated: Odra Opole; Zagłębie Wałbrzych
- European Cup: Ruch Chorzów
- Cup Winners' Cup: Gwardia Warsaw
- UEFA Cup: Górnik Zabrze; Legia Warsaw
- Matches: 240
- Goals: 476 (1.98 per match)
- Top goalscorer: Zdzisław Kapka (15 goals)
- Biggest home win: Stal 7–0 ŁKS
- Biggest away win: Zagłębie S. 0–6 Ruch
- Highest scoring: Stal 7–0 ŁKS
- Highest attendance: 50,000
- Total attendance: 3,345,360 ▲
- Average attendance: 13,939 ▼5.7%

The 1973–74 I liga was the 48th season of the Polish Football Championship and the 40th season of the I liga, the top Polish professional league for association football clubs, since its establishment in 1927. The league was operated by the Polish Football Association (PZPN).

The champions were Ruch Chorzów, who won their 11th Polish title.

== Competition modus ==
The season started on 25 August 1973 and concluded on 7 August 1974 (autumn-spring league). It was interrupted between the 27th matchday (12 May) and the 28th matchday (31 July) due to the 1974 FIFA World Cup. The season was played as a round-robin tournament. The team at the top of the standings won the league title. A total of 16 teams participated, 14 of which competed in the league during the 1972–73 season, while the remaining two were promoted from the 1972–73 II liga. Each team played a total of 30 matches, half at home and half away, two games against each other team. Teams received two points for a win and one point for a draw.

== League table ==
Pos	Team	Pld	W	D	L	GF	GA	GD	Pts	Qualification or relegation
1	Ruch Chorzów (C)	30	14	13	3	53	23	+30	41	Qualification to European Cup first round
2	Górnik Zabrze	30	16	6	8	43	27	+16	38	Qualification to UEFA Cup first round
3	Stal Mielec	30	13	11	6	41	24	+17	37	
4	Legia Warsaw	30	12	10	8	38	28	+10	34	Qualification to UEFA Cup first round
5	Wisła Kraków	30	11	12	7	35	27	+8	34	
6	ŁKS Łódź	30	9	11	10	24	28	−4	29	
7	ROW Rybnik	30	9	11	10	24	28	−4	29	
8	Pogoń Szczecin	30	8	13	9	28	38	−10	29	
9	Gwardia Warsaw	30	7	14	9	26	27	−1	28	Qualification to Cup Winners' Cup first round
10	Lech Poznań	30	8	12	10	25	26	−1	28	
11	Zagłębie Sosnowiec	30	10	7	13	22	31	−9	27	
12	Polonia Bytom	30	7	13	10	23	34	−11	27	
13	Śląsk Wrocław	30	9	9	12	21	34	−13	27	
14	Szombierki Bytom	30	8	10	12	26	31	−5	26	
15	Odra Opole (R)	30	6	12	12	25	37	−12	24	Relegated to II liga
16	Zagłębie Wałbrzych (R)	30	7	8	15	22	33	−11	22	Relegated to II liga

Source: 90minut.pl (in Polish)
(C) Champions; (R) Relegated

== Results ==
Home \ Away	GÓR	GWA	LPO	LEG	ŁKS	OOP	POG	BYT	RYB	RUC	STA	SZB	ŚLĄ	WIS	ZSO	ZWA
Górnik Zabrze		3–1	2–0	0–1	2–0	1–0	2–0	2–0	0–0	2–2	2–0	2–2	1–0	3–2	4–1	2–0
Gwardia Warsaw	1–2		0–0	1–2	0–1	3–1	0–0	0–0	1–1	1–1	2–1	2–2	0–2	0–2	2–0	0–0
Lech Poznań	1–1	1–1		1–3	2–1	0–0	0–0	0–0	0–1	1–2	0–0	1–0	4–0	3–1	2–0	1–0
Legia Warsaw	3–1	1–0	0–2		1–0	1–1	3–0	5–1	0–0	0–0	1–1	0–0	2–3	1–2	3–2	1–1
ŁKS Łódź	1–0	0–0	0–0	1–0		2–0	1–1	3–0	2–0	1–1	0–0	2–0	0–0	2–2	0–1	2–1
Odra Opole	0–1	0–0	2–1	1–1	0–0		2–2	0–1	1–1	3–2	4–0	0–0	0–1	0–2	1–0	1–0
Pogoń Szczecin	1–1	1–1	2–1	1–0	1–1	3–0		1–1	1–0	2–2	0–2	1–0	2–2	3–1	1–0	0–0
Polonia Bytom	0–3	0–0	3–0	1–1	1–1	1–1	2–0		2–1	0–0	1–3	1–1	1–0	0–0	0–0	2–0
ROW Rybnik	2–1	0–0	1–1	1–0	3–2	1–1	2–1	1–1		0–0	1–0	0–1	3–0	1–0	0–2	2–0
Ruch Chorzów	3–0	3–2	2–1	3–3	2–0	3–0	5–0	2–1	4–0		0–0	1–0	2–0	1–0	0–0	3–0
Stal Mielec	0–1	2–1	1–2	3–1	7–0	2–1	0–0	1–0	0–0	1–1		3–1	1–0	2–2	1–0	1–0
Szombierki Bytom	2–0	1–2	0–0	0–0	1–0	0–1	1–0	1–0	3–1	3–1	2–2		1–1	1–3	0–0	2–1
Śląsk Wrocław	2–0	0–2	2–0	0–1	1–0	1–1	1–2	0–1	0–0	1–0	0–5	1–0		1–1	0–0	1–0
Wisła Kraków	1–1	0–1	0–0	1–0	1–0	1–1	4–0	1–1	1–0	0–0	0–0	1–0	1–1		2–0	2–1
Zagłębie Sosnowiec	1–0	0–2	1–0	0–1	0–1	3–1	2–1	3–0	1–0	0–6	1–1	2–0	0–0	1–1		0–1
Zagłębie Wałbrzych	0–3	0–0	0–0	0–2	0–0	3–1	1–1	3–1	2–1	1–1	0–1	2–1	3–0	2–0	0–1	

Source: 90minut.pl (in Polish)
Legend: Blue = home team win; Yellow = draw; Red = away team win.

== Top goalscorers ==
Rank	Player	Club	Goals
1	(Poland) Zdzisław Kapka	Wisła Kraków	15
2	(Poland) Grzegorz Lato	Stal Mielec	13
2	(Poland) Joachim Marx	Ruch Chorzów	13
4	(Poland) Andrzej Szarmach	Stal Mielec	10
4	(Poland) Robert Gadocha	Legia Warsaw	10
4	(Poland) Bronisław Bula	Ruch Chorzów	10
4	(Poland) Władysław Dąbrowski	Legia Warsaw	10
8	(Poland) Roman Ogaza	Szombierki Bytom	9
8	(Poland) Jan Banaś	Górnik Zabrze	9
8	(Poland) Jan Benigier	Ruch Chorzów	9

== Attendances ==
No.	Club	Average
1	Lech Poznań	34,867
2	ŁKS	20,133
3	Ruch Chorzów	19,500
4	Wisła Kraków	18,267
5	Śląsk Wrocław	16,067
6	Pogoń Szczecin	15,200
7	Legia Warszawa	14,600
8	Górnik Zabrze	13,933
9	Stal Mielec	13,667
10	Polonia Bytom	10,833
11	Zagłębie Sosnowiec	10,320
12	ROW	9,900
13	Zagłębie Wałbrzych	7,267
14	Odra Opole	6,667
15	Gwardia Warszawa	6,000
16	Szombierki Bytom	5,800

== Bibliography ==
- Gowarzewski, Andrzej (2000). Encyklopedia Piłkarska Fuji. Liga Polska. O tytuł mistrza Polski 1920–2000 (in Polish). GiA, Katowice. ISBN 83-88232-02-9.
