= Toninu Camilleri =

Maltese footballer

Personal information
- Date of birth: 6 February 1945 (age 81)
- Place of birth: Sliema, Malta
- Position: Defender

Youth career
- Għargħur

Senior career*
Years	Team	Apps	(Gls)
1960–1972	Gżira United		
1972–1975	Sliema Wanderers	45	(21)
- Naxxar Lions

International career
1972–1975	Malta	6	(1)
- * Club domestic league appearances and goals

Toninu Camilleri (born 6 February 1945) is a Maltese former footballer, who represented the Malta national team.

== Club career ==
Born in Sliema, Camilleri started his career at lower division side Għargħur. During his senior career, he played as a striker for top-tier clubs Gżira United and Sliema Wanderers. He was Maltese First Division top goalscorer in 1974.

== International career ==
Camilleri made his debut for Malta in a November 1972 World Cup qualification match against Austria and earned a total of 6 caps, scoring 1 goal. His final international was a June 1975 European Championship qualification match away against Greece.

== Honours ==
- Maltese Second Division: 1

1964

- FA Trophy: 1

1974
