= Johny Hoffmann =

Luxembourgish footballer (1944–2018)

Personal information
- Date of birth: 12 October 1944
- Date of death: 7 February 2018 (aged 73)

International career
| Years | Team | Apps | (Gls) |
| 1968–1972 | Luxembourg | 19 | (0) |

Johny Hoffmann (12 October 1944 – 7 February 2018) was a Luxembourgish footballer. He played in 19 matches for the Luxembourg national football team from 1968 to 1972.
