= Zdzisław Kapka =

Polish footballer (born 1954)

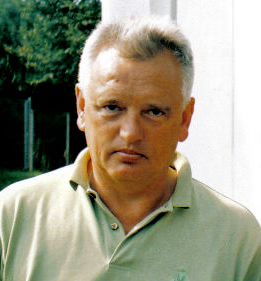
- Kapka in 2007

Personal information
- Full name: Zdzisław Ryszard Kapka
- Date of birth: 7 December 1954 (age 71)
- Place of birth: Kraków, Poland
- Height: 1.81 m (5 ft 11 1/2 in)
- Position: Forward

Youth career
- 1968–1971: Wisła Kraków

Senior career*
Years	Team	Apps	(Gls)
1971–1983	Wisła Kraków	327	(93)
1983–1986	Pittsburgh Spirit		
1987	Wisła Kraków	4	(0)

International career
- Poland U18
1973–1981	Poland	14	(1)
Medal record
Men's football
Representing Poland
FIFA World Cup
Third place	1974 West Germany
UEFA European Under-18 Championship
Third place	1972 Spain
- * Club domestic league appearances and goals

Zdzisław Ryszard Kapka (born 7 December 1954) is a Polish former professional footballer who played as a forward.

He played mostly for Wisła Kraków and later briefly for Pittsburgh Spirit in the United States. He earned 14 caps for the Poland national team and was a participant at the 1974 FIFA World Cup, where Poland won the bronze medal.

== Honours ==
Wisła Kraków

- Ekstraklasa: 1977–78

Poland

- FIFA World Cup third place: 1974

Poland U18

- UEFA European Under-18 Championship third place: 1972

Individual

- Ekstraklasa top scorer: 1973–74
