= Rainer Schlutter =

East German footballer

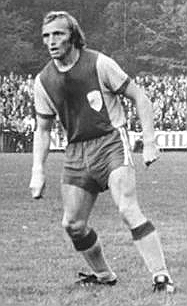

Personal information
- Date of birth: 14 September 1946 (age 80)
- Place of birth: Greiz, Soviet occupation zone, Germany
- Height: 1.64 m (5 ft 4 1/2 in)
- Position: Midfielder

Youth career
- –1963: BSG Chemie / BSG Fortschritt Greiz
- 1963–1966: SC Motor / FC Carl Zeiss Jena

Senior career*
Years	Team	Apps	(Gls)
1966–1977	FC Carl Zeiss Jena	235	(29)

International career
1970–1971	East Germany	5	(0)
1971	East Germany Olympic team	2	(0)
- * Club domestic league appearances and goals

Rainer Schlutter (born 14 September 1946) is a former East German football player.

== Club career ==
At club level, he made more than 230 East German top-flight appearances for FC Carl Zeiss Jena.

== International career ==
Schlutter won five caps for East Germany
