= Heinz Stickel =

German footballer

Personal information
- Date of birth: 9 May 1949
- Place of birth: West Germany
- Date of death: 15 November 2015 (aged 66)
- Position: Midfielder

Senior career*
| Years | Team | Apps | (Gls) |
| 1973–1975 | VfB Stuttgart | 65 | (16) |
| 1975–1978 | 1. FC Kaiserslautern | 67 | (8) |
| 1978 | San Diego Sockers | 7 | (1) |
| 1978–1979 | Nancy | 11 | (3) |
| 1979–1980 | SV Röchling Völklingen | 14 | (1) |
| 1980–1981 | Holstein Kiel | 20 | (2) |
| Total | | 184 | (31) |
- * Club domestic league appearances and goals

Heinz Stickel (9 May 1949 – 15 November 2015) was a German footballer who played as a midfielder.

== Career ==
In the summer of 1970, at the age of 21, he moved from SV 03 Tübingen to 1. Göppinger SV in what was then the second-tier Regionalliga Süd. He made his debut in the 1970/71 season on the opening day of the season, August 16, 1970, in a 4-2 home win against FC Schweinfurt 05 in the Regionalliga, scoring three times. Alongside the outstanding attacker Willi Hoffmann, he made 24 league appearances and scored eight goals. Göppingen, however, could not stay in the league, finishing 17th. From there he went to Spvgg 07 Ludwigsburg in 1972, again in the Regionalliga Süd. Ludwigsburg signed further players for the 1972/73 season, including Rainer Eisenhardt, Rainer Skrotzki, Peter Rübenach and Hans Mayer. "Sprinter" Stickel made 25 league appearances under coaches Gunther Baumann and Kurt Sommerlatt, scoring twelve goals. However, the club was relegated to the amateur league in 16th place.
