= Lex Schoenmaker =

Dutch footballer and manager

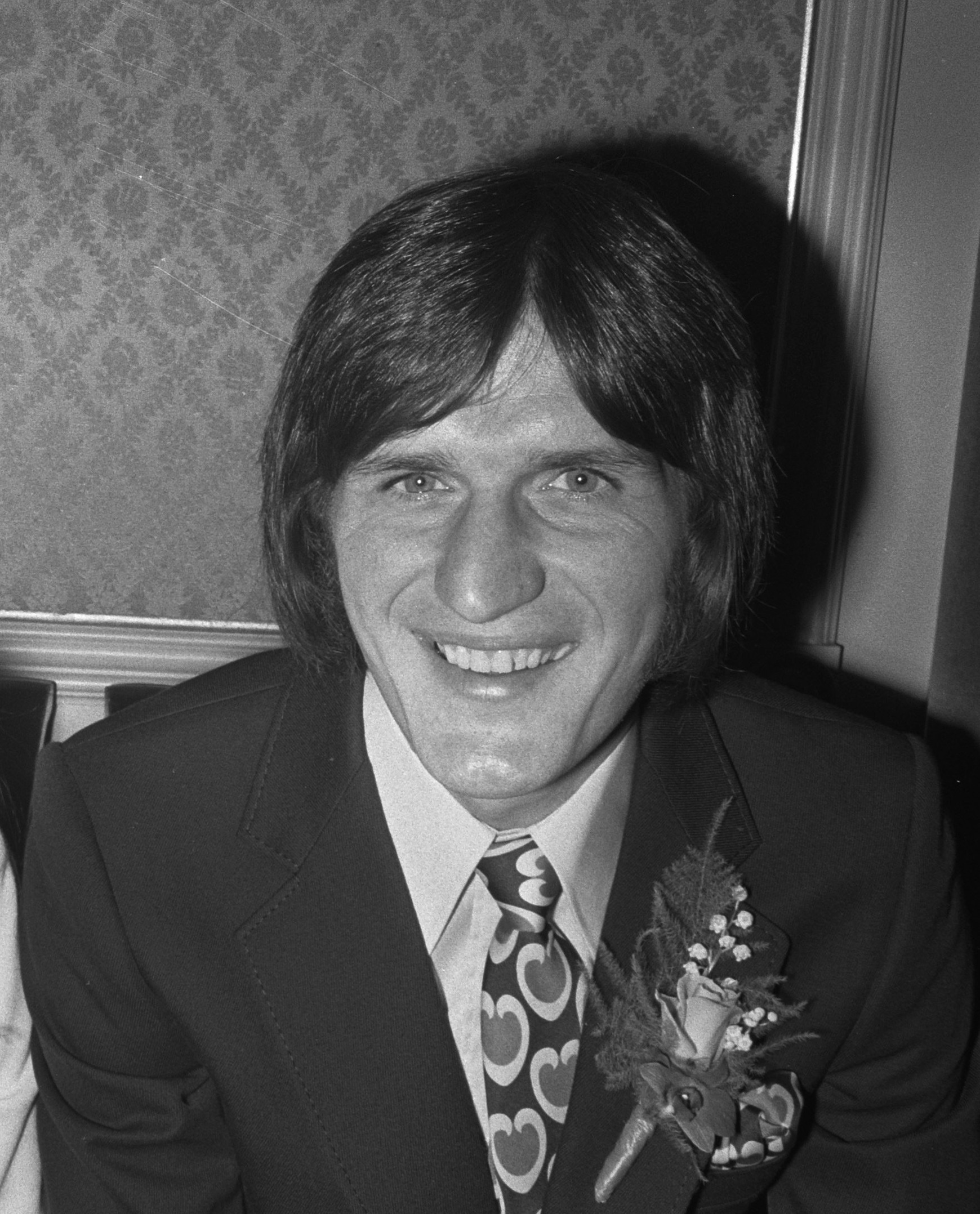
- Schoenmaker in 1971

Personal information
- Full name: Alex Schoenmaker
- Date of birth: 23 August 1947 (age 79)
- Place of birth: The Hague, Netherlands
- Height: 1.86 m (6 ft 1 in)
- Position: Forward

Senior career*
Years	Team	Apps	(Gls)
1966–1971	ADO	135	(54)
1967	→ San Francisco Gales (loan)	9	(1)
1971–1975	Feyenoord	104	(49)
1975–1982	FC Den Haag	157	(43)
1980	→ Edmonton Drillers (loan)	22	(6)
1981	→ Fort Lauderdale Strikers (loan)	22	(8)
Total		449	(161)

Managerial career
- 1990–1992: VCS Laakkwartier
- 1992–1993: AZ'67 (assistant)
- 1993–1994: Volendam (assistant)
- 1994–1995: FC Den Haag
- 1995: Dordrecht'90
- 1995–1996: Al Hilal (assistant)
- 1997–1999: TOP Oss
- 1999–2001: Al Jazira
- 2003–2004: ADO Den Haag
- 2006–2007: ADO Den Haag
- * Club domestic league appearances and goals

Alex Schoenmaker (born 23 August 1947) is a Dutch former professional football player and manager. Nicknamed Sexy-Lexie due to his good looks, he had a career as a player and manager in the Netherlands, the United States and the Middle East, mostly remembered as an icon of ADO Den Haag.

== Playing career ==
Schoenmaker was born in The Hague. His first club was amateur club VDS in his hometown. He began his professional career with ADO in 1965 and in 1967 appeared for the exported ADO team in the United States called the San Francisco Golden Gate Gales. He left for Feyenoord in the 1971–72 season, where he stayed for four years. For the Rotterdam-based club he scored 19 goals in European competitions – a record that still stands today. In 1974, Schoenmaker became European top goalscorer with 10 goals. After his tenure with Feyenoord, he retired from football as part of his first club ADO, which had meanwhile changed to FC Den Haag, and he played in the Zuiderpark until 1982. In the 1975–76 season, he was the European top goalscorer for the second time in his career, this time with six goals, sharing the honour with Aad Mansveld. Besides San Francisco Golden Gate Gales, Schoenmaker played in the USA and NASL leagues for the Edmonton Drillers and the Fort Lauderdale Strikers.

== Managerial career ==
After his playing career, he worked mostly as an assistant coach – among others with AZ'67, Volendam and Feyenoord. He was also head coach of TOP Oss, ADO Den Haag, Saudi club Al Hilal and Al Jazira Club from Abu Dhabi.
