= Keld Kristensen =

Danish football manager and former player (born 1952)

Personal information
- Date of birth: 16 January 1952 (age 74)
- Place of birth: Gladsaxe, Denmark
- Position: Right-back

Senior career*
Years	Team	Apps	(Gls)
1969–1980	B 1903	288	
1981–1985	B93	133	

International career
1970	Denmark U19	5	(1)
1972	Denmark U21	1	(0)

Managerial career
- 1987–1988: B 1903
- 1988–1990: Albertslund IF
- 1991–1992: B 1903 (assistant)
- 1992–1994: F.C. Copenhagen (assistant)
- 1994: F.C. Copenhagen
- 1995–1996: Lyngby Boldklub (youth)
- * Club domestic league appearances and goals

Keld Kristensen (born 16 January 1952) is a Danish football manager and former player who works as a scout. During his playing career, he featured as a right-back for B 1903 and B93. He most notably managed F.C. Copenhagen.

== Playing career ==
Kristensen played most of his career at B 1903. Between 1970 and 1972 he played six games for various Denmark national youth sides. He scored one goal against the Netherlands under-19s on 8 August 1970.

== Coaching career ==
As a manager, he started in his old club B 1903. Later he returned to the club as assistant for Benny Johansen. When B 1903 merged with Kjøbenhavns Boldklub to form F.C. Copenhagen in 1992, Kristensen continued as Johansen's assistant. When Johansen stopped as manager in 1994, Kristensen was named new head coach. The club had a terrible start to the 1994-1995 season: In the UEFA Cup they only barely defeated Finnish side FC Jazz Pori, and after five games in the Superliga the club had lost three games and drawn two. Due to the bad results the board chose to sack Kristensen and replaced him with Johansen.

== Honours ==
=== Player ===
B 1903

- Danish championship: 1969, 1970, 1976; runner-up 1972, 1977
- Danish Cup: 1979

B93

- Danish Cup: 1982
