= Władysław Dąbrowski =

Polish footballer (born 1947)

Personal information
- Date of birth: 21 September 1947 (age 79)
- Place of birth: Poland
- Position: Striker

Senior career*
| Years | Team | Apps | (Gls) |
| –1966 | Pogoń Grodzisk Mazowiecki | | |
| 1966–1968 | Legia Warsaw | | |
| 1968–1972 | Ursus Warsaw | | |
| 1972–1973 | Widzew Łódź | | |
| 1973–1977 | Legia Warsaw | 114 | (44) |
| 1977–1980 | Widzew Łódź | | |
| 1980–1984 | OTP | | |
| 1984–1985 | Ursus Warsaw | | |
- * Club domestic league appearances and goals

Władysław Dąbrowski (born 21 September 1947) is a Polish former footballer who played as a striker.

== Playing career ==
In 1973, Dąbrowski signed for Polish side Legia Warsaw, where he was regarded as one of the club's most important players.

== Post-playing career ==
After retiring from professional football, Dąbrowski worked as a football referee, where he was described as "famous in the football community for reporting the cash he received - PLN 300,000 - and bringing it to the Polish Football Association".

== Personal life ==
Dąbrowski has been married.
