= 1973 Football League Cup final =

- Match programme cover
- Event: 1972–73 Football League Cup
Norwich City	Tottenham Hotspur
0	1
- Date: 3 March 1973
- Venue: Wembley Stadium, London
- Referee: David Smith (Stonehouse)
- Attendance: 100,000

The 1973 Football League Cup final was held on 3 March 1973 and was won by Tottenham Hotspur. Spurs beat Norwich City 1–0 at the old Wembley. After 12 different teams had won the League Cup in its first 12 seasons, Spurs became the first team to win the competition for a second time.

== Match ==
=== Summary ===
The only goal of the game was scored by substitute Ralph Coates in the 72nd minute with a low right foot shot to the left corner of the net from just outside the penalty area.

=== Details ===
3 March 1973
15:30

Tottenham Hotspur	1–0	Norwich City
Coates 72'

Wembley Stadium, London
Attendance: 100,000

Tottenham Hotspur	Norwich City

1	(Northern Ireland) Pat Jennings
2	(Republic of Ireland) Joe Kinnear
3	(England) Cyril Knowles
4	(England) John Pratt	(substituted off) 25'
5	(Wales) Mike England
6	(England) Phil Beal
7	(Scotland) Alan Gilzean
8	(England) Steve Perryman
9	(England) Martin Chivers
10	(England) Martin Peters (c)
11	(England) Jimmy Pearce
Substitute:
12	(England) Ralph Coates	(substituted on) 25'
Manager:
(England) Bill Nicholson

1	(England) Kevin Keelan
2	(England) Clive Payne
3	(England) Geoff Butler
4	(England) Dave Stringer
5	(Scotland) Duncan Forbes (c) (yellow card)
6	(England) Max Briggs
7	(England) Doug Livermore
8	(Scotland) Jim Blair	(substituted off) 82'
9	(England) David Cross
10	(England) Graham Paddon
11	(England) Terry Anderson
Substitute:
12	(England) Trevor Howard	(substituted on) 82'
Manager:
(England) Ron Saunders

== Road to Wembley ==
Home teams listed first.

=== Norwich City ===
Round 2: Norwich City 2–1 Leicester City

Round 3: Hull City 1–2 Norwich City

Round 4: Stockport County 1-5 Norwich City

Quarter final: Arsenal 0–3 Norwich City

Semi final, 1st leg: Chelsea 0–2 Norwich City

Semi final, 2nd leg: Norwich City 1–0 Chelsea

Norwich City won 3–0 on aggregate

=== Tottenham Hotspur ===
Round 2: Tottenham Hotspur 2-1 Huddersfield Town

Round 3: Middlesbrough 1-1 Tottenham Hotspur

Replay Tottenham Hotspur 0–0(a.e.t.) Middlesbrough
2nd Replay Tottenham Hotspur 2–1(a.e.t.) Middlesbrough

Round 4: Tottenham Hotspur 2-0 Millwall

Quarter final: Liverpool 1-1 Tottenham Hotspur

Replay Tottenham 3–1 Liverpool

Semi final, 1st leg: Wolverhampton Wanderers 1–2 Tottenham Hotspur

Semi final, 2nd leg: Tottenham Hotspur 2–2(a.e.t.) Wolverhampton Wanderers

Tottenham won 4–3 on aggregate
