= Martin Peters =

English footballer and manager (1943–2019)

Martin Peters MBE
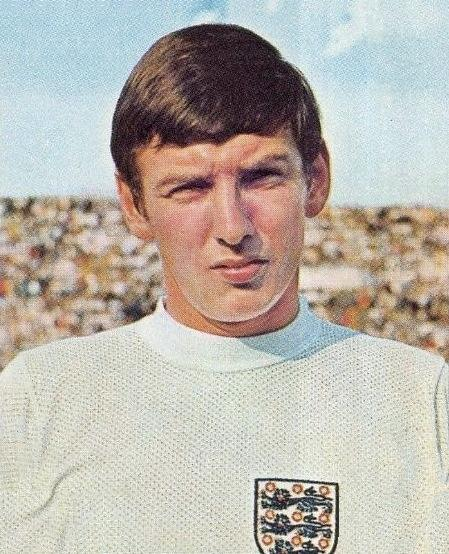
- Peters in 1970

Personal information
- Full name: Martin Stanford Peters
- Date of birth: 8 November 1943
- Place of birth: Plaistow, Essex, England
- Date of death: 21 December 2019 (aged 76)
- Place of death: Brentwood, England
- Height: 6 ft 0 in (1.84 m)
- Position: Midfielder

Senior career*
Years	Team	Apps	(Gls)
1959–1970	West Ham United	302	(81)
1970–1975	Tottenham Hotspur	189	(46)
1975–1980	Norwich City	207	(44)
1979	Frankston City (guest)	5	(3)
1980–1981	Sheffield United	24	(4)
1982–1983	Gorleston		
Total		727	(178)

International career
1960–1962	England Youth	12	(1)
1962–1966	England U23	5	(2)
1966–1974	England	67	(20)

Managerial career
- 1981: Sheffield United
Medal record
Men's football
Representing England
FIFA World Cup
Winner	1966 England
UEFA European Championship
Third place	1968 Italy
- * Club domestic league appearances and goals

Martin Stanford Peters MBE (8 November 1943 – 21 December 2019) was an English footballer and manager. As a member of the England team which won the 1966 FIFA World Cup, he scored the second of England's four goals in the final against West Germany. He also played in the 1970 FIFA World Cup. Born in Plaistow, Essex, he played club football for West Ham United, Tottenham Hotspur, Norwich City and Sheffield United. He briefly managed Sheffield United before retiring from professional football in 1981.

Peters was known as "the complete midfielder" as he could pass the ball well with either foot, was good in the air and difficult to mark because of his movement. A free kick specialist, he was described by England manager Sir Alf Ramsey, after a game against Scotland in 1968, as being "ten years ahead of his time". His versatility was such that while he was at West Ham he played in every position in the team, including goalkeeper in his third game, replacing an injured Brian Rhodes. With his transfer from West Ham United to Tottenham Hotspur in 1970, he became Britain's first £200,000 footballer.

Overall, he made over 1,100 appearances in his career.

== Early years ==
Peters was born in Egham Road, off Beckton Road in Plaistow, Essex, on Monday 8 November 1943 during the Second World War. His father, William Peters, was a Thames Lighterman. Shortly after Peters' birth, he was evacuated with his mother to Shropshire to avoid the bombing of London by the Luftwaffe. When he was seven his family moved to Dagenham, where he attended the local Fanshawe School. In schoolboy football, he played mostly as a centre-half but often as a full-back. He came to the attention of Fulham, Arsenal, Tottenham Hotspur and Chelsea. Peters did not support any club as a schoolboy and favoured joining Chelsea as his friend Terry Venables, whom he had met playing for Dagenham Schoolboys, had signed for Chelsea. After playing for England schoolboys he was scouted by Wally St Pier for West Ham United. In the summer of 1959 he was signed as a 15-year-old apprentice by West Ham.

== Club career ==
=== West Ham United ===
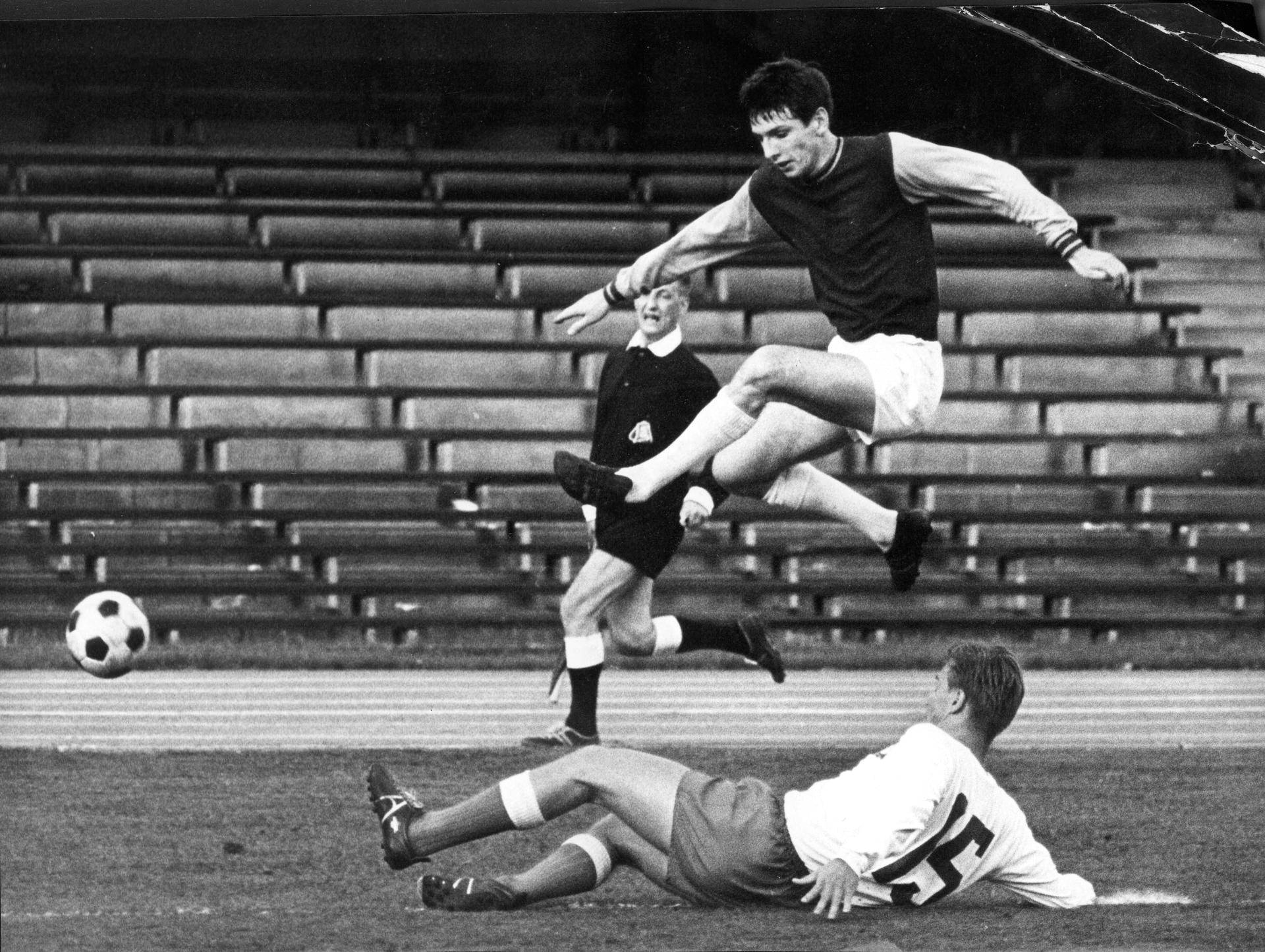
Peters jumping over Markku Peltoniemi in a match between West Ham United and HJK Helsinki, 1967

Peters signed his first professional contract in November 1960. His first manager Ted Fenton left the club in 1961, to be replaced by Ron Greenwood. He was a major influence on Peters and his progress as a young footballer. In his first years with West Ham, Peters had played in both defensive and midfield positions before Fenton had encouraged him to play as a right-half. He made his debut on Good Friday 1962 in a 4–1 home win against Cardiff City. He scored his first goal for West Ham in a 6–1 win at Manchester City on 8 September 1962. Also in 1962, Peters played in goal for West Ham in a game against Cardiff after regular goalkeeper, Brian Rhodes had been injured.

Peters played only five games in his first season with West Ham. Although he played 32 league games in the 1963–64 season, he played no part in their FA Cup run and was not selected for the FA Cup final of 1964 at Wembley, in which they beat Preston North End 3–2. The following year, however, he established himself as a first team regular and was victorious at Wembley when West Ham won the European Cup Winners Cup with victory over 1860 Munich. He was usually partnered in midfield by Eddie Bovington and Ronnie Boyce.

Peters began to impose himself on West Ham's game, and another chance for silverware came in 1966 when West Ham reached the League Cup final. The occasion was still over two-legs with each of the finalists hosting a leg (though this changed to a one-off final at Wembley a year later), and Peters played in both matches. He scored in the second game but opponents West Bromwich Albion emerged as 5–3 winners on aggregate. The 1968–69 season saw Peters' only hat-trick for West Ham, in a 4–0 home defeat of West Bromwich Albion. That was also his most prolific season: 24 goals came for him from 48 games.

=== Tottenham Hotspur ===
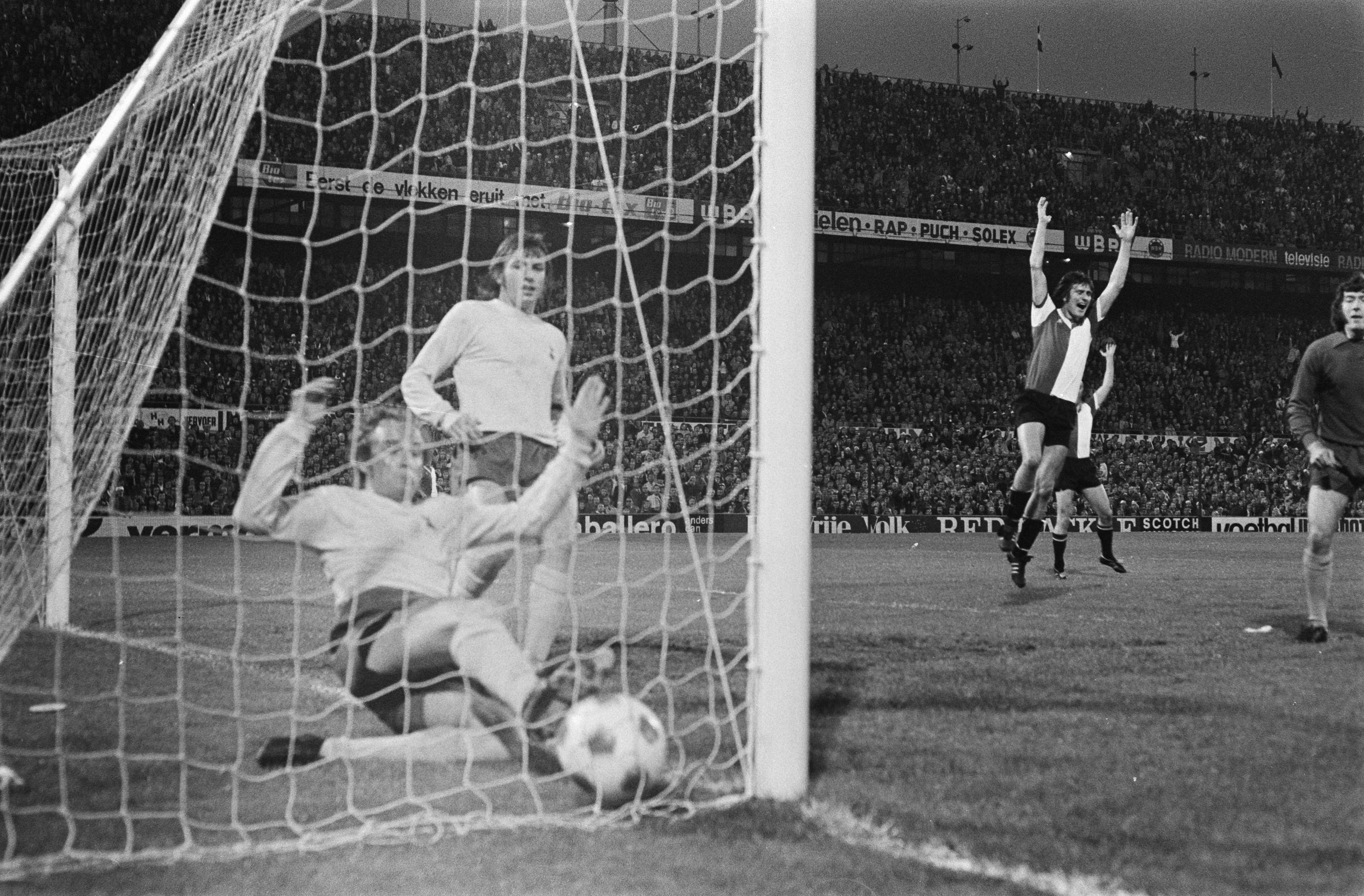
Peters (left, background) watches Phil Beal attempting a goal line clearance in the second leg match of the 1974 UEFA Cup final

Feeling he was in the shadows of Bobby Moore and Geoff Hurst, Peters sought a new challenge. In March 1970, West Ham received a record-breaking £200,000 (£150,000 cash) for Peters from Tottenham Hotspur and he moved to White Hart Lane, with Spurs and England striker Jimmy Greaves (valued at £50,000) going the other way. On 21 March 1970, Peters scored on his Spurs debut against Coventry City. He won his first domestic winners' medal in 1971 when Spurs beat Aston Villa 2–0 in the League Cup final, and his second European triumph when Spurs beat Wolverhampton Wanderers 3–2 on aggregate to win the 1972 UEFA Cup final. At the time, this was the only all-English European final until Manchester United beat Chelsea in the 2008 UEFA Champions League final. When Alan Mullery left for Fulham in 1972, Bill Nicholson made Martin club captain. In the 1973 Football League Cup final, Peters was the winning skipper as they defeated Norwich City 1–0. He completed one more full season with Spurs, who lost the 1974 UEFA Cup final to Feyenoord on aggregate. He then moved in March 1975 to Norwich City – managed by his former West Ham teammate John Bond – for a fee of £40,000. In total Peters played 260 times in all competitions, scoring 76 goals.

=== Norwich City ===
Peters, then aged 31, made his debut appearance for Norwich on 15 March 1975 in a 1–1 away draw with Manchester United. He helped newly promoted Norwich establish themselves in the First Division, making more than 200 appearances, and earning a testimonial against an all-star team which included most of the 1966 World Cup-winning England XI. He was voted Norwich City F.C. Player of the Season two years running, in 1976 and 1977, and in 2002 was made an inaugural member of the Norwich City F.C. Hall of Fame. In 1978, whilst still a Norwich City player, Peters was awarded an MBE for services to association football. Peters also travelled to Australia and played as a guest player for Victorian State League side Frankston City. For them he played five games, scoring three goals; the team won four and drew one of the matches in which he competed.

=== Sheffield United ===
Peters joined Sheffield United on 31 July 1980 as player-coach, eventually replacing Harry Haslam as manager.

== International career ==
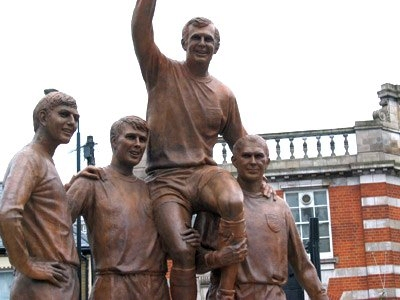
Peters (left) as part of The Champions statue, Location: The Boleyn, Newham, London

=== 1966 World Cup ===
Alf Ramsey had seen Peters' potential quickly, and in May 1966 he gave the young midfielder his debut for England national team against Yugoslavia at Wembley. England won 2–0 and Peters had an outstanding debut. Nearly scoring twice he set up chances for Jimmy Greaves and for others. In the final preparation period for Ramsey prior to naming his squad for the 1966 FIFA World Cup, Peters played in two more of the scheduled warm-up games. Against Finland, he scored his first international goal in what was only his second appearance, and subsequently he made Ramsey's squad for the competition, as did his West Ham teammates Bobby Moore (the England captain) and Geoff Hurst.

Though Peters did not play in the opening group game against Uruguay, the drab 0–0 draw prompted Ramsey into changes. The England coach had been toying with using a system which allowed narrow play through the centre, not operating with conventional wingers but instead with fitter, centralised players who could show willing in defence as well as spread the ball and their runs in attack. Peters therefore had become an ideal player for this 4-1-3-2 system, elegant in his distribution and strong in his forward running, yet showing the stamina, discipline and pace to get back and help the defence when required. This system was dubbed "the wingless wonders".

Ramsey put Peters in the team for his fourth cap, for the second group game against Mexico, which England won 2–0. He kept his place as England got through their group, scraped past a violent Argentina side in the quarter finals (Peters' late cross set up Hurst's header for the only goal) and beat Portugal in the last four. West Germany awaited in the final.

A tense but open game at Wembley saw the score at 1–1 in the final quarter of an hour when England won a corner. Alan Ball delivered it to the edge of the area to Hurst, who tried a shot on the turn. The ball deflected high into the air and bounced down into the penalty area where Peters rifled home a half-volley. West Germany equalised in the final seconds, though glory would still come the team's way with the 4–2 win in extra time, and Hurst – like Peters, winning only his eighth cap – completing a historic hat-trick.

=== 1970 World Cup ===
Peters played in England's three group games in the 1970 FIFA World Cup in Mexico, from which they qualified, again with West Germany waiting in the last eight. Peters scored against Germany again early in the second half – a run and finish from behind a defender which no West German player had spotted – to establish a 2–0 lead, but later Ramsey committed a tactical error by substituting Peters and Bobby Charlton with Colin Bell and Norman Hunter, and West Germany won 3–2 in extra-time.

=== Later international career ===
In 1972, Peters won his 50th England cap in a qualifier for UEFA Euro 1972, beating Switzerland 3–2. England failed to progress due to another defeat against West Germany, who went on to win the tournament. International disappointment for Peters was tempered mildly by more club success, and he scored the only goal as England beat Scotland at Wembley on 19 May 1973. It was his 20th goal for his country and would prove to be his last. England had been stuttering in their qualifying campaign for the 1974 FIFA World Cup, dropping points in a drawn game against Wales and then a 2–0 defeat against Poland in Chorzów on 6 June 1973. England needed to defeat Poland at Wembley on 17 October 1973 to qualify for the finals in Germany, and with an out-of-form Moore dropped from the side – he would subsequently play only once more for his country – Peters captained the side for the crucial game. A defensive error allowed Poland to score, and only a penalty allowed England to level up quickly. Allan Clarke scored from it, but England could not get the crucial winning goal. Poland went through after the match finished 1–1, meaning Peters would not play in a third successive World Cup competition.

At the age of 30, Peters' career at the highest level began to slip away. He played three more games for England, reaching a total of 67 caps, though his career with his country ended on 18 May 1974, as England lost 2–0 against Scotland at Hampden Park.

== Managerial career ==
Peters's wait to become manager was not long, his final game coming against Gillingham on 17 January 1981 which Haslam was too ill to attend, and at which there were demonstrations from the Sheffield United fans. Peters retired to take up the manager's job the following day with United 12th in the table with 16 games to play, but was unable to halt the decline already in place, winning just three of the remaining games. For the first and only time in their history Sheffield United were relegated to the Fourth Division, and Peters resigned. On his retirement from professional football in January 1981, after a distinguished and injury-free career, he had made 882 appearances in total, scoring 220 goals. After he quit Sheffield United, Peters spent the 1982–83 season playing in defence for Gorleston in the Eastern Counties League.

== After football ==
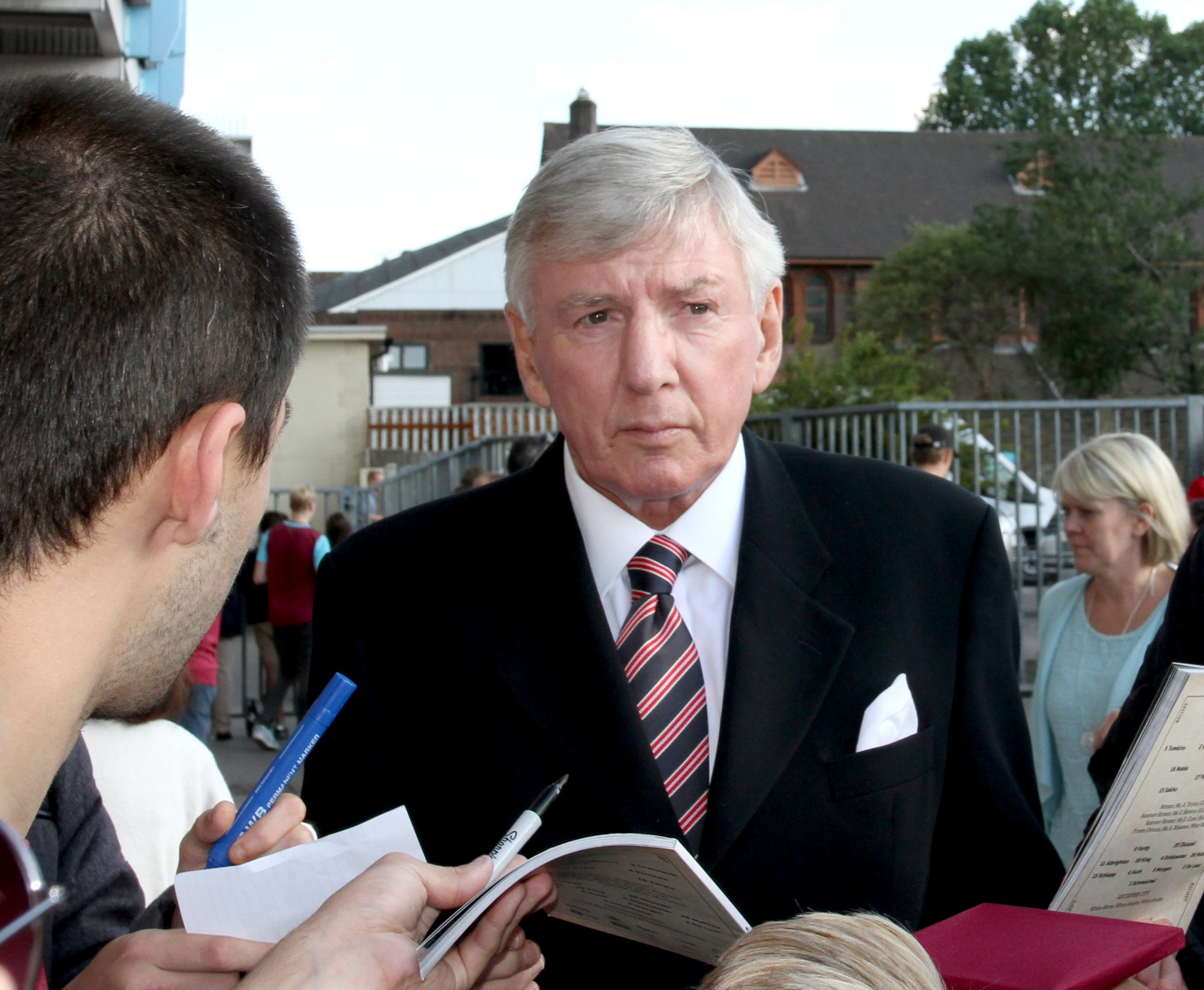
Peters signing autographs at the Boleyn Ground in 2015

In 1984, Peters moved into the insurance business where he stayed until he was made redundant in July 2001.

Peters joined the board of directors at Spurs in a non-executive capacity in 1998, taking on a supporter-liaison role. He remained in that post for four years before stepping down, but remained one of the match-day welcomers in the hospitality suites at the club's White Hart Lane ground. He also worked in the hospitality suites at Upton Park for West Ham home matches.

In 2006, Peters published his autobiography, The Ghost of '66. That same year he was inducted, with former manager Ron Greenwood, into the English Football Hall of Fame in recognition of his achievements as a player.

== Personal life ==
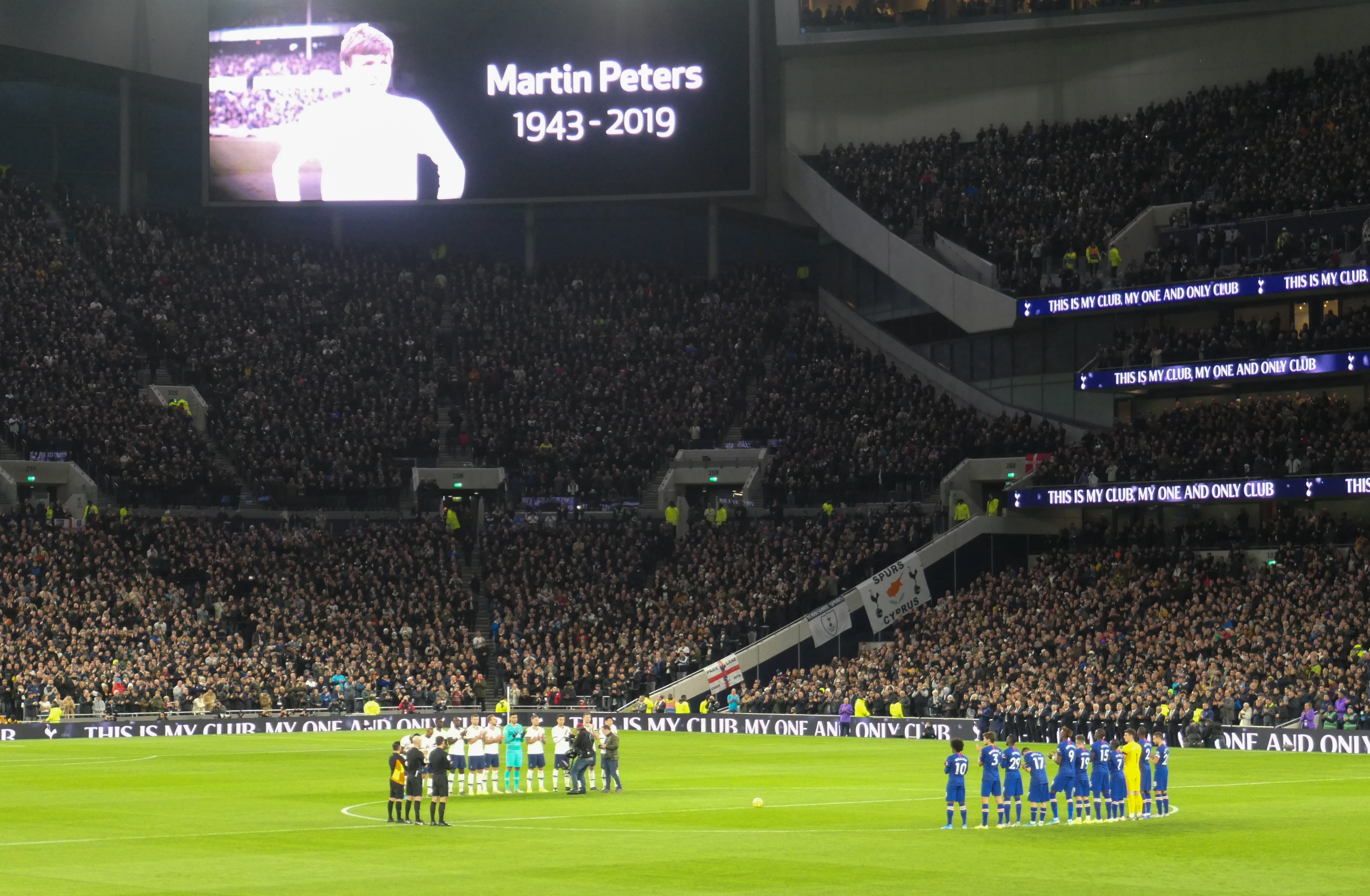
Pre-match tribute to Martin Peters at Tottenham Hotspur Stadium the day after his death was announced

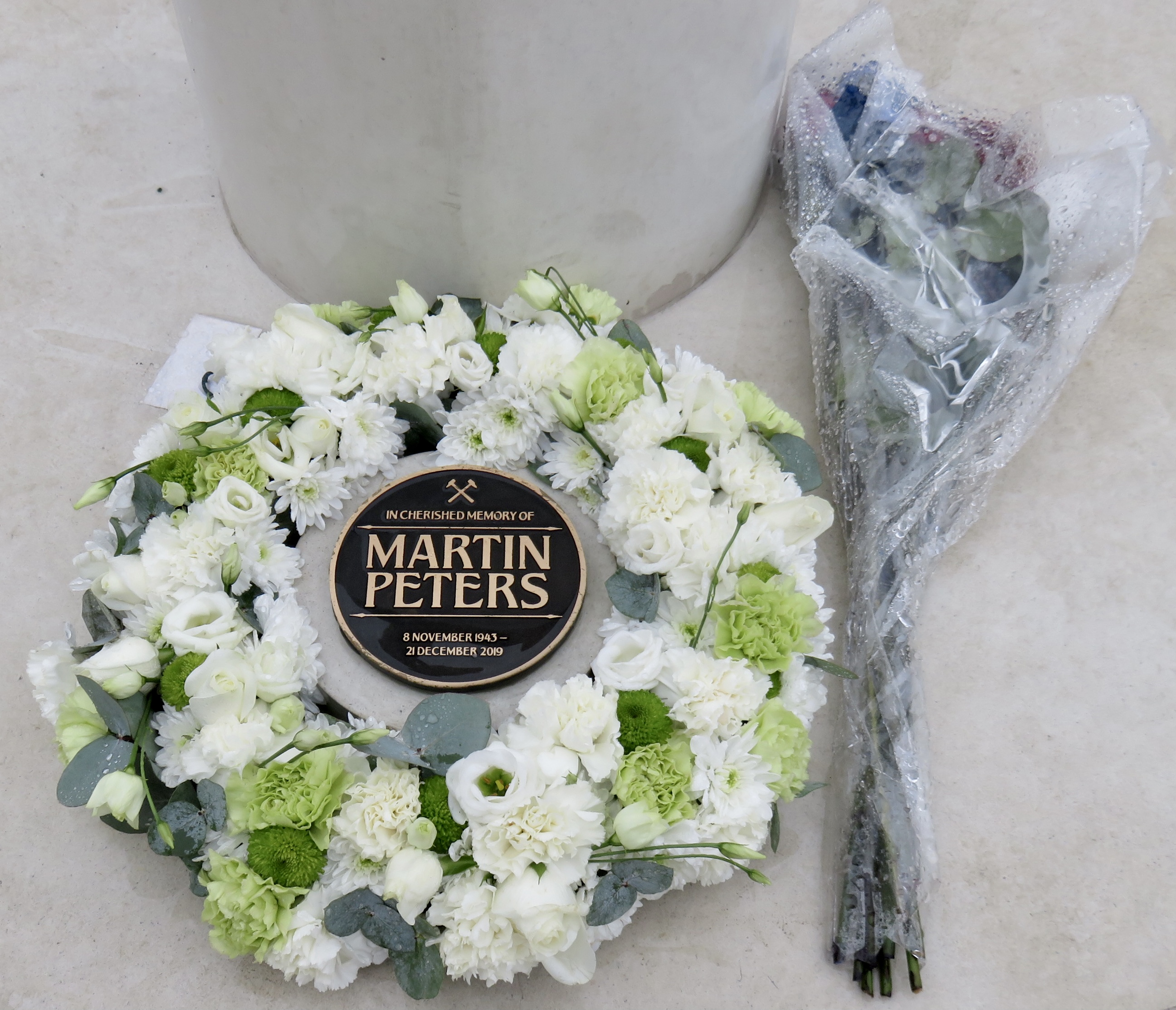
Memorial stone covering Peters' ashes at the London Stadium

In 1964, Peters married Kathleen Ward, with whom he had two children. They remained married until his death in 2019. Peters identified as a Conservative Party supporter when asked about his politics in 1972.

In 2016, it was announced that Peters had Alzheimer's disease. Peters died on 21 December 2019, aged 76. Tributes were paid to him from football clubs he played for, including West Ham, Tottenham Hotspur, Norwich City and many others. In September 2021, Peters' ashes were interred in a foundation stone at West Ham's ground, the London Stadium.

== Career statistics ==
=== Club ===
Appearances and goals by club, season and competition
Club	Season	League			FA Cup		League Cup		Other		Total	
Club	Season	Division	Apps	Goals	Apps	Goals	Apps	Goals	Apps	Goals	Apps	Goals
West Ham United	1961–62	First Division	5	0	0	0	0	0	—		5	0
West Ham United	1962–63	First Division	36	8	1	0	2	1	—		39	9
West Ham United	1963–64	First Division	32	3	0	0	4	0	—		36	3
West Ham United	1964–65	First Division	35	5	2	0	1	0	9 (Note: Appearance(s) in European Cup Winners' Cup)	1	47	6
West Ham United	1965–66	First Division	40	11	4	0	10	3	6	3	60	17
West Ham United	1966–67	First Division	41	14	2	0	6	2	—		49	16
West Ham United	1967–68	First Division	40	14	3	2	3	2	—		46	18
West Ham United	1968–69	First Division	42	19	3	3	3	2	—		48	24
West Ham United	1969–70	First Division	31	7	1	0	2	0	—		34	7
West Ham United	Total		302	81	16	5	31	10	15	4	364	100
Tottenham Hotspur	1969–70	First Division	7	2	—		—		—		7	2
Tottenham Hotspur	1970–71	First Division	42	9	5	2	7	4	4 (Note: Appearance(s) in Texaco Cup)	4	58	19
Tottenham Hotspur	1971–72	First Division	35	10	5	2	7	3	14 (Note: Twelve appearances two goals in UEFA Cup; two appearances in Anglo-Italian League Cup)	2	61	17
Tottenham Hotspur	1972–73	First Division	41	15	3	1	8	5	8 (Note: Appearance(s) in UEFA Cup)	3	60	24
Tottenham Hotspur	1973–74	First Division	35	6	1	0	1	0	12	8	49	14
Tottenham Hotspur	1974–75	First Division	29	4	2	0	0	0	—		31	4
Tottenham Hotspur	Total		189	46	16	5	23	12	38	17	266	80
Norwich City	1974–75	Second Division	10	2	—		—		—		10	2
Norwich City	1975–76	First Division	42	10	5	2	3	1	3 (Note: Appearance(s) in Anglo-Scottish Cup)	1	53	14
Norwich City	1976–77	First Division	42	7	1	1	2	0	3	0	48	8
Norwich City	1977–78	First Division	34	7	2	0	0	0	0	0	36	7
Norwich City	1978–79	First Division	39	10	1	0	3	2	3	0	46	12
Norwich City	1979–80	First Division	40	8	3	0	5	0	—		48	8
Norwich City	Total		207	44	12	3	13	3	9	1	241	51
Frankston City (guest)	1979	Victorian State League	5	3	—		—		—		5	3
Sheffield United	1980–81	Third Division	24	4	0	0	2	0	2	0	28	4
Career total			727	178	44	13	69	25	64	22	904	238

=== International ===
Appearances and goals by national team and year
National team	Year	Apps	Goals
England
England	1966	11	3
England	1967	4	2
England	1968	8	3
England	1969	8	3
England	1970	12	5
England	1971	8	2
England	1972	3	0
England	1973	11	2
England	1974	2	0
Total		64	20

Scores and results list England's goal tally first, score column indicates score after each Peters goal.

List of international goals scored by Martin Peters
No.	Date	Venue	Opponent	Score	Result	Competition
1	26 June 1966	Olympic Stadium, Helsinki, Finland	Finland	1–0	3–0	Friendly
2	30 July 1966	Wembley Stadium, London, England	West Germany	2–1	4–2 (a.e.t.)	1966 FIFA World Cup
3	22 October 1966	Windsor Park, Belfast, Northern Ireland	Northern Ireland	2–0	2–0	1966–67 British Home Championship, UEFA Euro 1968 qualification
4	21 October 1967	Ninian Park, Cardiff, Wales	Wales	1–0	3–0	1966–67 British Home Championship, UEFA Euro 1968 qualification
5	6 December 1967	Wembley Stadium, London, England	Soviet Union	2–2	2–2	Friendly
6	24 February 1968	Hampden Park, Glasgow, Scotland	Scotland	1–0	1–1	British Home Championship/UEFA Euro 1968 qualification
7	8 May 1968	Santiago Bernabéu Stadium, Madrid, Spain	Spain	1–1	2–1	UEFA Euro 1968 qualification
8	22 May 1968	Wembley Stadium, London, England	Sweden	1–0	3–1	Friendly
9	3 May 1969	Windsor Park, Belfast, Northern Ireland	Northern Ireland	1–0	3–1	1968–69 British Home Championship
10	10 May 1969	Wembley Stadium, London, England	Scotland	1–0	4–1	1968–69 British Home Championship
11	10 May 1969	Wembley Stadium, London, England	Scotland	4–0	4–1	1968–69 British Home Championship
12	21 April 1970	Wembley Stadium, London, England	Northern Ireland	1–0	3–1	British Home Championship
13	20 May 1970	Estadio El Campín, Bogotá, Colombia	Colombia	1–0	4–0	Friendly
14	20 May 1970	Estadio El Campín, Bogotá, Colombia	Colombia	2–0	4–0	Friendly
15	14 June 1970	Estadio León, León, Mexico	West Germany	2–0	2–3 (a.e.t.)	1970 FIFA World Cup
16	25 November 1970	Wembley Stadium, London, England	East Germany	2–0	4–1	Friendly
17	3 February 1971	Empire Stadium, Gżira, Malta	Malta	1–0	1–0	UEFA Euro 1972 qualification
18	22 May 1971	Wembley Stadium, London, England	Scotland	2–0	4–1	UEFA Euro 1972 qualification
19	15 May 1973	Wembley Stadium, London, England	Wales	3–0	3–0	1972–73 British Home Championship
20	19 May 1973	Wembley Stadium, London, England	Scotland	1–0	1–0	1972–73 British Home Championship

== Honours ==
West Ham United

- European Cup Winners' Cup: 1964–65
- Football League Cup runner-up: 1965–66

Tottenham Hotspur

- Football League Cup: 1970–71, 1972–73
- UEFA Cup: 1971–72; runner-up: 1973–74
- Anglo-Italian League Cup: 1971

England

- FIFA World Cup: 1966
- UEFA European Football Championship third place: 1968

Individual

- World XI: 1968, 1969
- Rothmans Golden Boots Awards: 1971

=== Orders and special awards ===
- MBE for services to football, (1978).
