= Jerry Taylor (disambiguation) =

Jerry Taylor (born 1962) is an American environmental activist and policy analyst.

Jerry or Gerry Taylor may also refer to:

- Jerry Taylor (politician) (1937–2016), American politician and businessman
- Gerry Taylor (born 1947), footballer

== See also ==
- Jermaine Taylor (disambiguation)
- Gerald Taylor (disambiguation)
- Jeremy Taylor (disambiguation)
