= Gerald Taylor =

Gerald Taylor is the name of:

- Gerald Kyffin-Taylor (1863–1949), British soldier and politician
- Gerry Taylor (born 1947), English footballer
- Gerald Taylor (actor) (1940–1994), actor and Dalek operator in Doctor Who; see The Daleks
- Gerald L. Taylor aka Jerry Taylor (fl. 1970s), publisher of National Lampoon magazine
- Gerry Taylor (golfer) (fl. 1985–1988), Australian professional golfer; see U-Bix Classic
- Gérald Taylor, Australian-French linguist
- Gerald Taylor (footballer) (born 2001), Costa Rican footballer with Heart of Midlothian F.C.

== See also ==
- Jerry Taylor (disambiguation)
