= 1972–73 Football League Cup =

Football League Cup
Tournament details
- Country: England; Wales
- Teams: 92

Final positions
- Champions: Tottenham Hotspur (2nd title)
- Runners-up: Norwich City

Tournament statistics
- Top goal scorer: Kevin Keegan (5 goals)

The 1972–73 Football League Cup was the 13th season of the Football League Cup, a knock-out competition for England's top 92 football clubs. The tournament started on 15 August 1972 and ended with the final at Wembley on 3 March 1973.

Tottenham Hotspur won the tournament after defeating Norwich City in the final at Wembley Stadium, London.

== Calendar ==
Of the 92 teams, 36 received a bye to the second round (teams ranked 1st–36th in the 1971–72 Football League) and the other 56 played in the first round. Semi-finals were two-legged.

Round	Main date	Fixtures		Clubs	New entries this round
Round	Main date	Original	Replays	Clubs	New entries this round
First Round	16 August 1972	28	8	92 → 64	56 (teams ranked 15th–22nd in Second Division; all Third and Fourth Division)
Second Round	5 September 1972	32	8	64 → 32	36 (teams ranked 1st–14th in Second Division; all First Division)
Third Round	3 October 1972	16	8	32 → 16	none
Fourth Round	31 October 1972	8	1	16 → 8	none
Fifth Round	21 November 1972	4	2	8 → 4	none
Semi-finals	December 1972 – January 1973	4	0	4 → 2	none
Final	3 March 1973	1	0	2 → 1	none

== First round ==
=== Ties ===
Home team	Score	Away team	Date
Aston Villa	4–1	Hereford United	16 August 1972
Barnsley	0–0	Grimsby Town	16 August 1972
Blackburn Rovers	0–1	Rochdale	16 August 1972
Bolton Wanderers	3–0	Oldham Athletic	16 August 1972
Bradford City	1–1	Stockport County	16 August 1972
Brentford	1–0	Cambridge United	16 August 1972
Brighton and Hove Albion	2–1	Exeter City	16 August 1972
Cardiff City	2–2	Bristol Rovers	16 August 1972
Chester City	4–3	Shrewsbury Town	16 August 1972
Darlington	0–1	Rotherham United	16 August 1972
Gillingham	1–0	Colchester United	16 August 1972
Halifax Town	1–2	Bury	15 August 1972
Hartlepool United	1–0	Doncaster Rovers	16 August 1972
Leyton Orient	2–0	Watford	16 August 1972
Mansfield Town	3–1	Lincoln City	16 August 1972
Northampton Town	0–3	Charlton Athletic	15 August 1972
Notts County	3–1	York City	16 August 1972
Oxford United	4–0	Peterborough United	16 August 1972
Plymouth Argyle	0–2	Bournemouth	15 August 1972
Reading	1–1	Fulham	16 August 1972
Scunthorpe United	0–0	Chesterfield	15 August 1972
Southend United	2–1	Aldershot	16 August 1972
Southport	4–1	Walsall	16 August 1972
Swansea City	1–1	Newport County	15 August 1972
Torquay United	1–2	Portsmouth	16 August 1972
Tranmere Rovers	0–1	Port Vale	16 August 1972
Workington	1–0	Preston North End	16 August 1972
Wrexham	4–0	Crewe Alexandra	16 August 1972

=== Replays ===
Home team	Score	Away team	Date
Bristol Rovers	3–1	Cardiff City	22 August 1972
Chesterfield	5–0	Scunthorpe United	23 August 1972
Fulham	1–1	Reading	23 August 1972
Grimsby Town	2–0	Barnsley	22 August 1972
Newport County	3–0	Swansea City	22 August 1972
Stockport County	1–1	Bradford City	21 August 1972

=== 2nd Replays ===
Home team	Score	Away team	Date
Bradford City	0–2	Stockport County	28 August 1972
Reading	0–1	Fulham	28 August 1972

== Second round ==
=== Ties ===
Home team	Score	Away team	Date
Arsenal	1–0	Everton	5 September 1972
Birmingham City	1–1	Luton Town	5 September 1972
Bournemouth	0–0	Blackpool	6 September 1972
Bristol Rovers	4–0	Brighton and Hove Albion	5 September 1972
Bury	1–0	Grimsby Town	5 September 1972
Carlisle United	1–1	Liverpool	5 September 1972
Charlton Athletic	4–3	Mansfield Town	5 September 1972
Coventry City	1–0	Hartlepool United	5 September 1972
Crystal Palace	0–1	Stockport County	5 September 1972
Gillingham	0–2	Millwall	5 September 1972
Hull City	1–0	Fulham	5 September 1972
Leeds United	4–0	Burnley	6 September 1972
Manchester City	4–0	Rochdale	6 September 1972
Middlesbrough	2–0	Wrexham	5 September 1972
Newport County	0–3	Ipswich Town	5 September 1972
Norwich City	2–1	Leicester City	6 September 1972
Nottingham Forest	0–1	Aston Villa	5 September 1972
Notts County	3–2	Southport	6 September 1972
Oxford United	2–2	Manchester United	6 September 1972
Port Vale	1–3	Newcastle United	5 September 1972
Portsmouth	0–1	Chesterfield	6 September 1972
Rotherham United	2–0	Brentford	5 September 1972
Sheffield Wednesday	2–0	Bolton Wanderers	6 September 1972
Southampton	0–0	Chester City	5 September 1972
Southend United	0–1	Chelsea	6 September 1972
Stoke City	3–0	Sunderland	6 September 1972
Swindon Town	0–1	Derby County	5 September 1972
Tottenham Hotspur	2–1	Huddersfield Town	6 September 1972
West Bromwich Albion	2–1	Queens Park Rangers	6 September 1972
West Ham United	2–1	Bristol City	6 September 1972
Wolverhampton Wanderers	2–1	Leyton Orient	5 September 1972
Workington	0–1	Sheffield United	6 September 1972

=== Replays ===
Home team	Score	Away team	Date
Blackpool	1–1	Bournemouth	11 September 1972
Chester City	2–2	Southampton	13 September 1972
Liverpool	5–1	Carlisle United	19 September 1972
Luton Town	1–1	Birmingham City	13 September 1972
Manchester United	3–1	Oxford United	12 September 1972

=== 2nd Replays ===
Home team	Score	Away team	Date
Birmingham City	1–0	Luton Town	19 September 1972
Bournemouth	1–2	Blackpool	18 September 1972
Southampton	2–0	Chester City	20 September 1972

== Third round ==
=== Ties ===
Home team	Score	Away team	Date
Arsenal	5–0	Rotherham United	3 October 1972
Aston Villa	1–1	Leeds United	4 October 1972
Birmingham City	2–1	Coventry City	3 October 1972
Bristol Rovers	1–1	Manchester United	3 October 1972
Bury	2–0	Manchester City	3 October 1972
Derby County	0–0	Chelsea	4 October 1972
Hull City	1–2	Norwich City	3 October 1972
Ipswich Town	1–2	Stoke City	3 October 1972
Middlesbrough	1–1	Tottenham Hotspur	3 October 1972
Millwall	2–0	Chesterfield	3 October 1972
Newcastle United	0–3	Blackpool	4 October 1972
Sheffield United	0–0	Charlton Athletic	3 October 1972
Southampton	1–3	Notts County	3 October 1972
Stockport County	2–1	West Ham United	4 October 1972
West Bromwich Albion	1–1	Liverpool	3 October 1972
Wolverhampton Wanderers	3–1	Sheffield Wednesday	4 October 1972

=== Replays ===
Home team	Score	Away team	Date
Charlton Athletic	2–2	Sheffield United	10 October 1972
Chelsea	3–2	Derby County	9 October 1972
Leeds United	2–0	Aston Villa	11 October 1972
Liverpool	2–1	West Bromwich Albion	10 October 1972
Manchester United	1–2	Bristol Rovers	11 October 1972
Tottenham Hotspur	0–0	Middlesbrough	11 October 1972

=== 2nd Replays ===
Home team	Score	Away team	Date
Sheffield United	1–0	Charlton Athletic	23 October 1972
Tottenham Hotspur	2–1	Middlesbrough	30 October 1972

== Fourth round ==
=== Ties ===
Home team	Score	Away team	Date
Blackpool	2–0	Birmingham City	31 October 1972
Bury	0–1	Chelsea	31 October 1972
Liverpool	2–2	Leeds United	31 October 1972
Notts County	3–1	Stoke City	31 October 1972
Sheffield United	1–2	Arsenal	31 October 1972
Stockport County	1–5	Norwich City	1 November 1972
Tottenham Hotspur	2–0	Millwall	1 November 1972
Wolverhampton Wanderers	4–0	Bristol Rovers	31 October 1972

=== Replay ===
Home team	Score	Away team	Date
Leeds United	0–1	Liverpool	22 November 1972

== Fifth round ==
=== Ties ===
Home team	Score	Away team	Date
Arsenal	0–3	Norwich City	21 November 1972
Chelsea	3–1	Notts County	22 November 1972
Liverpool	1–1	Tottenham Hotspur	4 December 1972
Wolverhampton Wanderers	1–1	Blackpool	21 November 1972

=== Replays ===
Home team	Score	Away team	Date
Blackpool	0–1	Wolverhampton Wanderers	28 November 1972
Tottenham Hotspur	3–1	Liverpool	6 December 1972

== Semi-finals ==
=== First leg ===
Home team	Score	Away team	Date
Chelsea	0–2	Norwich City	13 December 1972
Wolverhampton Wanderers	1–2	Tottenham Hotspur	20 December 1972

=== Second leg ===
Home team	Score	Away team	Date	Agg
Norwich City	1–0	Chelsea	3 January 1973	3–0
Tottenham Hotspur	2–2	Wolverhampton Wanderers	30 December 1972	4–3

== Final ==
The final was held at Wembley Stadium, London on 3 March 1973.

The 1973 Football League Cup Final was won by Tottenham Hotspur. Spurs beat Norwich City 1–0 at Wembley Stadium, Ralph Coates with the goal.

3 March 1973
15:30

Tottenham Hotspur	1–0	Norwich City
Coates 72'

Wembley Stadium, London
Attendance: 100,000

Tottenham Hotspur	Norwich City

1	(Northern Ireland) Pat Jennings
2	(Republic of Ireland) Joe Kinnear
3	(England) Cyril Knowles
4	(England) John Pratt	(substituted off) 25'
5	(Wales) Mike England
6	(England) Phil Beal
7	(Scotland) Alan Gilzean
8	(England) Steve Perryman
9	(England) Martin Chivers
10	(England) Martin Peters (c)
11	(England) Jimmy Pearce
Substitute:
12	(England) Ralph Coates	(substituted on) 25'
Manager:
(England) Bill Nicholson

1	(England) Kevin Keelan
2	(England) Clive Payne
3	(England) Geoff Butler
4	(England) Dave Stringer
5	(Scotland) Duncan Forbes (c) (yellow card)
6	(England) Max Briggs
7	(England) Doug Livermore
8	(Scotland) Jim Blair	(substituted off) 82'
9	(England) David Cross
10	(England) Graham Paddon
11	(England) Terry Anderson
Substitute:
12	(England) Trevor Howard	(substituted on) 82'
Manager:
(England) Ron Saunders
