= 1972 UEFA Cup final =

1972 UEFA Cup Final
- Event: 1971–72 UEFA Cup
Wolverhampton Wanderers	Tottenham Hotspur
(England)	(England)
2	3
- on aggregate

First leg
Wolverhampton Wanderers	Tottenham Hotspur
1	2
- Date: 3 May 1972
- Venue: Molineux, Wolverhampton
- Referee: Tofiq Bahramov (Soviet Union)
- Attendance: 38,362

Second leg
Tottenham Hotspur	Wolverhampton Wanderers
1	1
- Date: 17 May 1972
- Venue: White Hart Lane, London
- Referee: Laurens van Ravens (Netherlands)
- Attendance: 54,303

The 1972 UEFA Cup Final was the final of the first UEFA Cup football tournament. It was a two-legged contest played on 3 May and 17 May 1972 between two English clubs, Wolverhampton Wanderers and Tottenham Hotspur. This was the first UEFA club competition final to feature two teams from the same association.

Tottenham Hotspur won the tie 3–2 on aggregate. A 2–1 victory away from home in the first leg proved decisive for them, with Martin Chivers scoring a remarkable late winner, firing in an unstoppable shot from 25 yards. They then held Wolves to a 1–1 draw in the second leg to win the competition.

== Route to the final ==
Note: In all results below, the score of the finalist is given first (H: home; A: away).

(England) Wolverhampton Wanderers				Round	(England) Tottenham Hotspur			
Opponent	Agg.	1st leg	2nd leg	Round	Opponent	Agg.	1st leg	2nd leg
(Portugal) Académica	7–1	3–0 (H)	4–1 (A)	First round	(Iceland) Keflavík	15–1	6–1 (A)	9–0 (H)
(Netherlands) ADO Den Haag	7–1	3–1 (A)	4–0 (H)	Second round	(France) Nantes	1–0	0–0 (A)	1–0 (H)
(East Germany) Carl Zeiss Jena	4–0	1–0 (A)	3–0 (H)	Third round	(Romania) Rapid București	5–0	3–0 (H)	2–0 (A)
(Italy) Juventus	3–2	1–1 (A)	2–1 (H)	Quarter-finals	(Romania) UTA Arad	3–1	2–0 (A)	1–1 (H)
(Hungary) Ferencváros	4–3	2–2 (A)	2–1 (H)	Semi-finals	(Italy) A.C. Milan	3–2	2–1 (H)	1–1 (A)

== Match details ==
=== First leg ===
3 May 1972
19:30 BST

Wolverhampton Wanderers (England)	1–2	(England) Tottenham Hotspur
McCalliog 72'	Report	Chivers 57', 87'

Molineux, Wolverhampton
Attendance: 38,362
Referee: Tofiq Bahramov (Soviet Union)

Wolverhampton Wanderers	Tottenham Hotspur

GK	1	(England) Phil Parkes
DF	2	(England) Bernard Shaw	Booked
DF	3	(England) Gerry Taylor
MF	4	(Northern Ireland) Danny Hegan
DF	5	(Scotland) Frank Munro
DF	6	(England) John McAlle
MF	7	(Scotland) Jim McCalliog (c)
MF	8	(England) Kenny Hibbitt
FW	9	(England) John Richards
FW	10	(Northern Ireland) Derek Dougan
MF	11	(England) Dave Wagstaffe
Substitutes:
DF	12	(England) Derek Parkin
GK	13	(England) Rod Arnold
FW	14	(Scotland) Hugh Curran
MF	15	(England) Steve Daley
FW	16	(England) Peter Eastoe
Manager:
(England) Bill McGarry

GK	1	(Northern Ireland) Pat Jennings
DF	2	(Republic of Ireland) Joe Kinnear	Booked
DF	3	(England) Cyril Knowles
MF	4	(England) Alan Mullery (c)
DF	5	(Wales) Mike England
DF	6	(England) Phil Beal
FW	7	(Scotland) Alan Gilzean
MF	8	(England) Steve Perryman
FW	9	(England) Martin Chivers
MF	10	(England) Martin Peters
MF	11	(England) Ralph Coates		(substituted off) 68'
Substitutes:
DF	12	(England) Ray Evans
GK	13	(England) Barry Daines
DF	14	(England) Terry Naylor
MF	15	(England) John Pratt		(substituted in) 68'
MF	16	(England) Jimmy Pearce
Manager:
(England) Bill Nicholson

=== Second leg ===
17 May 1972
19:45 BST

Tottenham Hotspur (England)	1–1	(England) Wolverhampton Wanderers
Mullery 29'	Report	Wagstaffe 40'

White Hart Lane, London
Attendance: 54,303
Referee: Laurens van Ravens (Netherlands)

Tottenham Hotspur	Wolverhampton Wanderers

GK	1	(Northern Ireland) Pat Jennings
DF	2	(Republic of Ireland) Joe Kinnear
DF	3	(England) Cyril Knowles
MF	4	(England) Alan Mullery (c)
DF	5	(Wales) Mike England
DF	6	(England) Phil Beal
FW	7	(Scotland) Alan Gilzean
MF	8	(England) Steve Perryman
FW	9	(England) Martin Chivers
MF	10	(England) Martin Peters
MF	11	(England) Ralph Coates
Substitutes:
DF	12	(England) Ray Evans
GK	13	(England) Barry Daines
DF	14	(England) Terry Naylor
MF	15	(England) John Pratt
MF	16	(England) Jimmy Pearce
Manager:
(England) Bill Nicholson

GK	1	(England) Phil Parkes
DF	2	(England) Bernard Shaw
DF	3	(England) Gerry Taylor
MF	4	(Northern Ireland) Danny Hegan
DF	5	(Scotland) Frank Munro
DF	6	(England) John McAlle
MF	7	(Scotland) Jim McCalliog (c)
MF	8	(England) Kenny Hibbitt	(substituted off) 55'
FW	9	(England) John Richards
FW	10	(Northern Ireland) Derek Dougan	(substituted off) 84'
MF	11	(England) Dave Wagstaffe
Substitutes:
DF	12	(England) Derek Parkin
GK	13	(England) Rod Arnold
MF	14	(England) Mike Bailey	(substituted in) 55'
FW	15	(Scotland) Hugh Curran	(substituted in) 84'
MF	16	(England) Steve Daley
Manager:
(England) Bill McGarry

== See also ==
- 1921 FA Cup final
- 1972 European Cup final
- 1972 European Cup Winners' Cup final
- List of football matches between British clubs in UEFA competitions
- Tottenham Hotspur F.C. in European football
- Wolverhampton Wanderers F.C. in European football
- 1971–72 Tottenham Hotspur F.C. season
