= John Pratt (footballer) =

English footballer

Personal information
- Full name: John Arthur Pratt
- Date of birth: 26 June 1948 (age 78)
- Place of birth: Hackney, London, England
- Height: 5 ft 8 3/4 in (1.75 m)
- Position: Midfielder

Senior career*
Years	Team	Apps	(Gls)
1965–1980	Tottenham Hotspur	331	(39)
1980–1982	Portland Timbers	84	(2)
1980–1982	Portland Timbers (indoor)	35	(3)
Total		450	(44)
- * Club domestic league appearances and goals

John Pratt (born 26 June 1948) is an English former professional footballer who played as a midfielder. He spent much of his career at Tottenham Hotspur.

== Career ==
=== Tottenham Hotspur ===
Pratt was born in Hackney, London. He signed for the club as a junior in November, 1965. He made his debut in April 1969 against Arsenal. Making 415 appearances and scoring 49 goals in all competitions in 11 seasons at the club. He always gave 100% in his midfield duties but was often made the scapegoat when Spurs performed poorly, and never quite winning over certain sections of the White Hart Lane crowd. In his career at Spurs he played in every outfield position. He played as a substitute in the first leg as Tottenham won the 1972 UEFA Cup Final, and also started the 1973 League Cup final. However, in the latter game he got injured and was substituted by Ralph Coates who went on to score the winning goal.

=== Later career ===
He joined Portland Timbers in the North American Soccer League (NASL) in 1980 and stayed for three seasons in the USA.

After returning to Spurs he went on to coach the youth and junior sides before being promoted assistant manager to Peter Shreeves till 1986.

== Post-retirement ==
He ran a window cleaning company and went into partnership with ex-Spur Mark Falco in an asbestos clearing concern until 2020. Pratt was a regular for the clubs Old Boys XI. Since a knee and ankle injury his duties at the club are restricted to working in hospitality and as an unofficial team coach.

== Honours ==
Tottenham Hotspur

- Football League Cup: 1972–73
- UEFA Cup: 1971–72; runner-up 1973–74
