= Geoff Butler =

English footballer and manager

Personal information
- Full name: Geoffrey Butler
- Date of birth: 26 September 1946 (age 80)
- Place of birth: Middlesbrough, England
- Position: Defender

Senior career*
Years	Team	Apps	(Gls)
1965–1967	Middlesbrough	55	(1)
1967	Chelsea	9	(0)
1967–1969	Sunderland	3	(0)
1969–1976	Norwich City	153	(1)
1974–1975	→ Baltimore Comets (loan)	40	(2)
1975–1981	AFC Bournemouth	119	(1)
1981–1982	Peterborough United	39	(0)
Total		418	(5)

Managerial career
- 1983–2000: Salisbury City
- 2002–2003: Weymouth
- * Club domestic league appearances and goals

Geoffrey Butler (born 26 September 1946) is a former professional footballer who played as a defender in The Football League between the 1960s and 1980s.

He started out with his hometown club Middlesbrough and made 55 league appearances for them before a transfer to Chelsea in September 1967. He only made a total of nine appearances for Chelsea. He later played for Sunderland and Norwich City, and whilst at Norwich he played for the Baltimore Comets of the North American Soccer League in the 1974 and 1975 NASL summer seasons, making a total of 40 appearances. He also played for AFC Bournemouth. While at Norwich, he was a member of the team that reached the final of the League Cup in 1973.

In 1983, Butler was appointed as player/manager of Salisbury in the Southern League, later also becoming commercial manager.

In 1992, it was revealed that South Africa national team manager Jeff Butler had been sacked from his post for passing off Geoffrey Butler's playing career as his own.

== Honours ==
Norwich City

- Football League Second Division: 1971–72
- Football League Cup runner-up: 1972–73
