= Trevor Howard (footballer) =

English footballer

Trevor Edward Howard (born 2 June 1949) is a former professional footballer who played as a midfielder or right-back.

Howard began his career with Norwich City, with whom he won the Second Division championship in 1972. He became the first substitute to score for the club when he scored the winner against Hull City on 26 December 1968. After making 156 appearances and scoring 19 goals for Norwich, he went on to play for AFC Bournemouth and Cambridge United. As part of the deal for his transfer to Bourmeounth in 1974, Tony Powell moved in the opposite direction to join Norwich.

== Honours ==
Norwich City

- Football League Second Division: 1971–72
- Football League Cup runner-up: 1972–73

== Bibliography ==
- Mike Davage, John Eastwood, Kevin Platt (2001). Canary Citizens. Jarrold Publishing. ISBN 0-7117-2020-7.
