= Max Briggs =

English footballer

Personal information
- Date of birth: 9 September 1948 (age 78)
- Positions: Midfielder; winger

Senior career*
Years	Team	Apps	(Gls)
1968–1974	Norwich City		
1974–1977	Oxford United		
- * Club domestic league appearances and goals

Maxwell Francis Briggs (born 9 September 1948) is an English former professional footballer who played as a midfielder or a winger.

Briggs was born in 1948. His father had worked as a bricklayer. He signed for Norwich City under manager Lol Morgan, initially playing as a winger before switching to playing as a midfielder under Ron Saunders. Briggs made 21 starts for Norwich in their promotion-winning 1971–72 season.

== Honours ==
Norwich City

- Football League Second Division: 1971–72
- Football League Cup runner-up: 1972–73
