= Clive Payne =

English footballer

Personal information
- Full name: Clive Edward Payne
- Date of birth: 2 March 1950 (age 76)
- Place of birth: Aylsham, England
- Position: Defender

Senior career*
Years	Team	Apps	(Gls)
1968–1973	Norwich City	125	(0)
1973–?	Bournemouth	101	(3)
Total		226	(3)
- * Club domestic league appearances and goals

Clive Edward Payne (born 2 March 1950) is an English former professional footballer.

Payne, a right back, began his career with Norwich City. He was a member of the team that won the second division championship in 1972 and reached the final of the League Cup in 1973.

Payne made 150 appearances for Norwich, scoring three goals. He left the club in November 1973 to join AFC Bournemouth, where his career was ended by injury.

== Honours ==
Norwich City

- Football League Second Division: 1971–72
- Football League Cup runner-up: 1972–73

== Sources ==
- Davage, Mike; Eastwood, John; Platt, Kevin (2001). Canary Citizens. Jarrold Publishing. ISBN 0-7117-2020-7.
