= Jeremy Taylor (disambiguation) =

Jeremy Taylor (1613–1667) was a clergyman in the Church of England.

Jeremy Taylor may also refer to:

Australians

- Jeremy Lindsay Taylor (born 1973), Australian actor
- Jeremy Taylor (Australian footballer) (born 1992), Australian rules football player

Brits

- Jeremy Taylor (singer) (born 1937), English folk singer and songwriter
- Jeremy Taylor (writer), English writer and publisher
- Jeremy Taylor (canoeist), British slalom canoeist

Americans

- Jeremy Taylor (politician) (born 1978), member of the Iowa House of Representatives
- Jeremy Ray Taylor (born 2003), American actor
- Jeremy Taylor (dream worker) (1943–2018), American dream worker, author and Unitarian Universalist minister

== See also ==
- Jerry Taylor (disambiguation)
