= Jermaine Taylor =

Jermaine Taylor may refer to:

- Jermaine Taylor (basketball) (born 1986), American basketball player
- Jermain Taylor (born 1978), American boxer
- Jermaine Taylor (footballer) (born 1985), Jamaican footballer

== See also ==
- Jerry Taylor (disambiguation)
