= Wolverhampton Wanderers F.C. in European football =

English club in European football

Wolverhampton Wanderers F.C. in European competitions
- Club: Wolverhampton Wanderers
- Seasons played: 8
- Most appearances: Derek Dougan (18)
- Top scorer: Derek Dougan (12)
- First entry: 1958–59 European Cup
- Latest entry: 2019–20 UEFA Europa League

This is the list of all Wolverhampton Wanderers' European matches. The club's first entry into European competitions was the 1958–59 European Cup, with their most recent being the 2019–20 UEFA Europa League. They reached the UEFA Europa League quarter-finals for the 2019–20 season where they were defeated 1-0 by Sevilla. The best result was reaching the final of the 1971–72 UEFA Cup, that they lost 3–2 on aggregate against Tottenham Hotspur.

== European final ==
- Wolverhampton Wanderers score listed first

Year	Date	Competition	Opposing Team	Score (*)	Venue	Captain	Manager
1972	(1st leg) 3 May (2nd leg) 17 May	UEFA Cup	(England) Tottenham Hotspur	2–3 agg	(England) Molineux Stadium, Wolverhampton (England) White Hart Lane, London	(Scotland) Jim McCalliog	(England) Bill McGarry

== Overall record ==
As of 11 August 2020

Competition	Played	Won	Drew	Lost	GF	GA	GD	Win%
European Cup	8	2	2	4	12	16	−4	25.00
European Cup Winners' Cup	4	1	1	2	6	5	+1	25.00
UEFA Cup / UEFA Europa League	37	25	5	7	79	39	+40	67.57
Total	49	28	8	13	97	58	+39	57.14

Legend: GF = Goals For. GA = Goals Against. GD = Goal Difference.

Pld = Matches played; W = Matches won; D = Matches drawn; L = Matches lost; GF = Goals for; GA = Goals against. Defunct competitions indicated in italics.

== Matches ==
List of Wolverhampton Wanderers games in UEFA competitions
Season	Competition	Round	Opponent	Home	Away	Aggregate	References
1958–59	European Cup	1R	(West Germany) Schalke 04	2–2	1–2	3–4	
1959–60	European Cup	PR	(East Germany) Vorwärts Berlin	2–0	1–2	3–2	
1959–60	European Cup	R16	(Socialist Federal Republic of Yugoslavia) Red Star Belgrade	3–0	1–1	4–1	
1959–60	European Cup	QF	(Spain) Barcelona	2–5	0–4	2–9	
1960–61	European Cup Winners' Cup	QF	Austria Wien	5–0	0–2	5–2	
1960–61	European Cup Winners' Cup	SF	(Scotland) Rangers	1–1	0–2	1–3	
1971–72	UEFA Cup	1R	(Portugal) Académica	3–0	4–1	7–1	
1971–72	UEFA Cup	2R	(Netherlands) ADO Den Haag	4–0	3–1	7–1	
1971–72	UEFA Cup	3R	(East Germany) Carl Zeiss Jena	3–0	1–0	4–0	
1971–72	UEFA Cup	QF	(Italy) Juventus	2–1	1–1	3–2	
1971–72	UEFA Cup	SF	(Hungary) Ferencvárosi	2–1	2–2	4–3	
1971–72	UEFA Cup	Final	(England) Tottenham Hotspur	1–2	1–1	2–3	
1973–74	UEFA Cup	1R	(Portugal) Belenenses	2–0	2–1	4–1	
1973–74	UEFA Cup	2R	(East Germany) Lokomotive Leipzig	4–1	0–3	4–4 (a)	
1974–75	UEFA Cup	1R	(Portugal) Porto	3–1	1–4	4–5	
1980–81	UEFA Cup	1R	(Netherlands) PSV Eindhoven	1–0	1–3	2–3	
2019–20	UEFA Europa League	2QR	(Northern Ireland) Crusaders	2–0	4–1	6–1	
2019–20	UEFA Europa League	3QR	(Armenia) Pyunik	4–0	4–0	8–0	
2019–20	UEFA Europa League	PO	(Italy) Torino	2–1	3–2	5–3	
2019–20	UEFA Europa League	Group K	(Portugal) Braga	0–1	3–3	2nd	
2019–20	UEFA Europa League	Group K	(Turkey) Beşiktaş	4–0	1–0	2nd	
2019–20	UEFA Europa League	Group K	(Slovakia) Slovan Bratislava	1–0	2–1	2nd	
2019–20	UEFA Europa League	R32	(Spain) Espanyol	4–0	2–3	6–3	
2019–20	UEFA Europa League	R16	(Greece) Olympiacos	1–0	1–1	2–1	
2019–20	UEFA Europa League	QF	(Spain) Sevilla	0–1			
