= Graham Shaw (footballer, born 1934) =

English footballer and manager

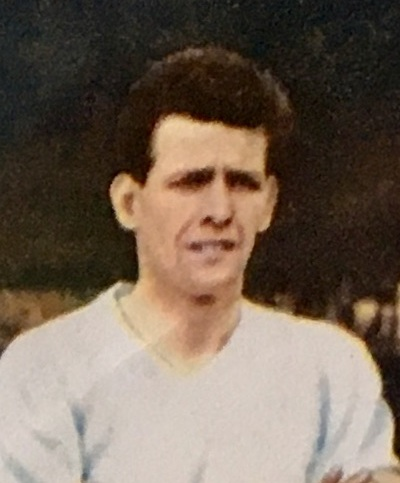

Personal information
- Full name: Graham Laurence Shaw
- Date of birth: 9 July 1934
- Place of birth: Sheffield, England
- Date of death: 12 May 1998 (aged 63)
- Place of death: Sheffield, England
- Position: Left-back

Senior career*
Years	Team	Apps	(Gls)
1951–1967	Sheffield United	442	(12)
1967–1968	Doncaster Rovers	22	(0)
1968–1969	Scarborough		
Total		464	(12)

International career
1958–1962	England	5	(0)

Managerial career
- 1968–1969: Scarborough (player-manager)
- * Club domestic league appearances and goals

Graham Laurence Shaw (9 July 1934 – 12 May 1998) was an English professional footballer who played as a left-back. He notably represented Sheffield United between 1951 and 1967.

== Career ==
Born in Sheffield, Shaw was developed by local amateur side Oaks Fold, after having played for Sheffield Schoolboys at half-back. He signed a professional contract with Sheffield United in 1951, at the age of seventeen and made his debut for the Blades against fierce rivals Sheffield Wednesday at Hillsborough on 5 January 1952 before a crowd of 65,384; United won the match 3–1.

Shaw would make in excess of 400 appearances for United over the following sixteen years; however, he found first-team opportunities limited after 1965, and in 1967 moved to Doncaster Rovers. He stayed at Doncaster for one season before joining Scarborough as their player-manager. Shaw managed Scarborough for one season, leaving the club in 1969.

Shaw died in 1998. He was the elder brother of Bernard Shaw, the Sheffield United, Wolves, and Sheffield Wednesday full back. He was not related to Joe Shaw, a long-time Sheffield United and England defensive colleague.

== International career ==
At international level, Shaw won five caps for the England national side. His first cap came against the U.S.S.R. at Wembley on 22 October 1958, in a match England won 5–0. He made his last appearance for his country in 1962.

== Playing style ==
Shaw was known as 'a calm, stylish player, who had pace and tackled well and could place his clearances'.
