= Jimmy Pearce =

English footballer

Personal information
- Full name: James William Pearce
- Date of birth: 27 November 1947 (age 78)
- Place of birth: Tottenham, London, England
- Position: Winger

Senior career*
Years	Team	Apps	(Gls)
1965–1973	Tottenham Hotspur	108	(21)
- * Club domestic league appearances and goals

James William Pearce (born 27 November 1947) is an English former professional footballer. Pearce played in the position of winger for Tottenham Hotspur and represented England at schoolboy level.

== Football career ==
Pearce joined Spurs as an apprentice in June 1965. A dependable, skilful winger he made a total of 193 appearances for the club including 53 as substitute and scoring on 35 occasions. Pearce featured in the winning 1973 Football League Cup Final side, and was substitute in the 1971 Football League Cup Final, and sub in both legs of the 1972 UEFA Cup Final. He retired from football through injury in 1973.

== Honours ==
Tottenham Hotspur

- Football League Cup: 1970–71, 1972–73
- UEFA Cup: 1971–72
