= Phil Beal =

English footballer

Personal information
- Full name: Philip Beal
- Date of birth: 8 January 1945 (age 81)
- Place of birth: Godstone, England
- Position: Central defender

Youth career
- Tottenham Hotspur

Senior career*
Years	Team	Apps	(Gls)
1963–1975	Tottenham Hotspur	333	(1)
1975–1977	Brighton & Hove Albion	10	(0)
1977	Ilford		
1977	Los Angeles Aztecs	23	(3)
1978	Memphis Rogues	22	(0)
1979–1980	Crewe Alexandra	4	(0)
- Chelmsford City
1980	Oxford City	12	(0)
- * Club domestic league appearances and goals

Phil Beal (born 8 January 1945) is an English former footballer who played as a central defender.

== Career ==
=== Tottenham Hotspur ===
Beal was born in Godstone, Surrey. He played for Surrey boys and England Youth before signing as an amateur for Tottenham Hotspur in 1960, and became a professional at the club in 1962.

He made his debut as a defender against Aston Villa in 1963, and went on to make 16 appearances in that season.

By the start of the following season Danny Blanchflower had retired with Beal taking on the former captain's right half position. With the team in transition, he only made eight appearances that season.

The versatile player filled a variety with defensive positions and featured in 21 matches in 1965–66, started in 26 games in 1966–67, but did not feature in the 1967 FA Cup Final because of an injury. By the late 1960s he had fully established himself in the side and consistently showed his calm, authoritative and composed style.

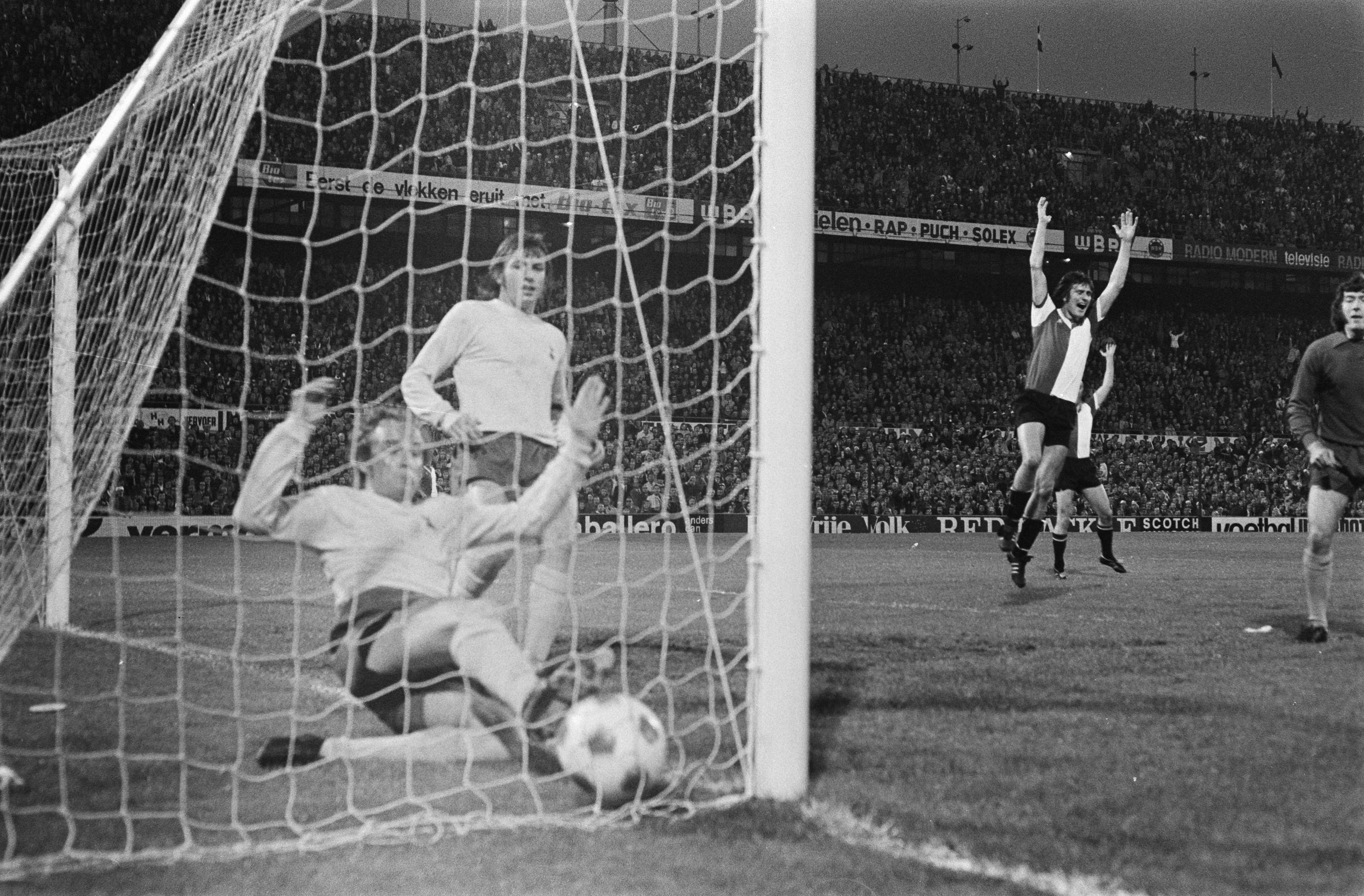
Beal attempts to make a goal-line clearance which leads to the first goal by Feyenoord in the second leg of the 1974 UEFA Cup final

Beal played in both League Cup winning sides against Aston Villa in 1970-71 and Norwich City in 1972-73. He played in both matches against Wolverhampton Wanderers in the 1972 UEFA Cup Final in which he collected a winners' medal, and in both legs of the 1974 UEFA Cup Final against Feyenoord.

Beal finished his career with Spurs in 1975 and made 420 appearances, including three as substitute in all competitions, and scoring just one goal.

=== Later career ===
After leaving Spurs he played for Brighton & Hove Albion, Crewe Alexandra, Los Angeles Aztecs and Memphis Rogues.

== After football ==
Today, Beal is a match day host at White Hart Lane.

== Honours ==
Tottenham Hotspur

- Football League Cup: 1970–71, 1972–73
- UEFA Cup: 1971–72; runner-up 1973–74
