= Gerry Taylor =

English footballer

Personal information
- Full name: Gerald William Taylor
- Date of birth: 15 August 1947 (age 79)
- Place of birth: Hull, England
- Position: Defender

Youth career
- –: Wath Wanderers
- –: Wolverhampton Wanderers

Senior career*
Years	Team	Apps	(Gls)
1966–1976	Wolverhampton Wanderers	154	(1)
1967	→ Los Angeles Wolves		
1975	→ Swindon Town (loan)	19	(0)
- * Club domestic league appearances and goals

Gerald William Taylor (born 15 August 1947) is an English former footballer who played in the Football League as a defender for Wolverhampton Wanderers, where he spent the majority of his playing career, and Swindon Town, and in the United Soccer Association league for the Los Angeles Wolves.

== Career ==
Taylor was born in Hull, and began his football career at Wath Wanderers, the Yorkshire-based nursery club of Wolverhampton Wanderers, before heading south to join them. After proving himself in the reserve ranks, he progressed to making his first team debut on 31 December 1966 in a goalless draw with Ipswich Town in the Second Division. He remained in the team for the remainder of the 1966–67 season as the club won promotion to the First Division, and was part of the squad that won the United Soccer Association league that summer under the Los Angeles Wolves guise.

The defender was often reserve to players such as Joe Wilson, Bobby Thomson, Bernard Shaw and Derek Parkin in the Wolves defence over his career, but played in both legs of the 1972 UEFA Cup Final. With fewer opportunities in his latter years with the club, he spent time on loan at Swindon Town in 1975.

After 192 appearances in total for Wolves, he retired from the professional game in 1976. He spent 26 years in the police force, and then worked at the RAF Museum in Cosford.
