= Bernard Shaw (footballer, born 1945) =

English footballer

Personal information
- Date of birth: 14 March 1945 (age 81)
- Place of birth: Sheffield, England
- Height: 5 ft 6 1/2 in (1.69 m)
- Position: Full back

Senior career*
Years	Team	Apps	(Gls)
1962–1969	Sheffield United	136	(0)
1969–1973	Wolverhampton Wanderers	116	(0)
1973–1976	Sheffield Wednesday	104	(3)
1976–19xx	Worksop Town		
- * Club domestic league appearances and goals

Bernard Shaw (born 14 March 1945, in Sheffield) is an English former footballer who played as a full back. He played more than 100 Football League games for each of the Sheffield clubs and for Wolverhampton Wanderers, in a career of more than 400 senior games.

== Career ==
Shaw began his career at Sheffield United as an apprentice. He made his first team debut during 1963 and, by 1966, was a first choice player. He was sold to Wolverhampton Wanderers for £70,000 in July 1969. He made his Wolves debut on 8 October 1969 in a 2–2 draw with Sheffield Wednesday. After playing infrequently during his debut season he was a first choice player over the following seasons, which saw him play in the 1972 UEFA Cup Final. After 156 appearances in total for Wolves, he returned to his native Sheffield in the summer of 1973, joining Sheffield Wednesday. He played over 100 games for the Owls over the next three seasons before dropping into non-league football with Worksop Town before retiring. Shaw is the younger brother of the late Graham Shaw, the former Sheffield United and England full back.
