= Ralph Coates =

English footballer (1946–2010)

Personal information
- Full name: Ralph Coates
- Date of birth: 26 April 1946
- Place of birth: Hetton-le-Hole, England
- Date of death: 17 December 2010 (aged 64)
- Place of death: Luton, England
- Position: Winger

Youth career
- 1962–1964: Burnley

Senior career*
Years	Team	Apps	(Gls)
1964–1971	Burnley	216	(26)
1971–1978	Tottenham Hotspur	188	(14)
1978	St George	11	(3)
1978–1981	Orient	76	(12)
Total		480	(52)

International career
1966–1969	England U-23	8	(2)
1970–1971	England	4	(0)
- * Club domestic league appearances and goals

Ralph Coates (26 April 1946 – 17 December 2010) was an English professional footballer who played as a winger. Coates played for Burnley, Tottenham Hotspur and Orient, making 480 appearances in the Football League. From 1970 to 1971, he played for the England national team, earning four caps.

== Club career ==
Coates was born in Hetton-le-Hole, County Durham. He was an apprentice colliery fitter and his footballing ability was spotted by Burnley's North-East scout Jack Hixon. Coates joined Burnley on trial in 1961, and after a period as an apprentice, turned professional in 1963. He made his first-team debut in December 1964, scoring his first goal in a 2–0 win against Leicester City in March 1965. He would go on to make 261 appearances for Burnley in all competitions, scoring 32 goals. After Burnley had been relegated from the First Division in 1971, Coates was sold to Tottenham Hotspur for a fee of £190,000. He played over 300 games for Tottenham and earned winner's medals for the 1971–72 UEFA Cup and the 1972–73 Football League Cup, where he scored the winning goal in the final. Coates left Tottenham in 1978 and had a short period playing with St George in the Australian National Soccer League, before returning to play for Orient, where he was also on the coaching staff. He played 84 games in all competitions for Orient scoring 12 goals.

He retired from professional football in 1982, but continued to play non-league football for Hertford Heath, Ware and Nazeing.

== International career ==
Coates played eight times for England U-23 and four times for England. He was a member of the initial squad for the 1970 World Cup but was not selected for the final squad which travelled to Mexico.

== Personal life ==
Coates was married twice, first to Veronica Banks in 1968 (whom he subsequently divorced) and then to Lesley Clarkson in 1981 (from whom he had separated by the time of his death). He had a son and a daughter. Coates was a Labour Party supporter.

After his football career ended, Coates became a travel agent. He later moved into the leisure industry, managing leisure centres in Chelmsford and Boreham Wood and was involved with Tottenham Hotspur for over 20 years, where he worked as a match-day host. He was also a football coach for disabled children.

== Death ==
In early December 2010, he suffered a series of strokes and was hospitalised. He died on 17 December 2010 at the Luton and Dunstable Hospital NHS Trust aged 64.

== Career statistics ==
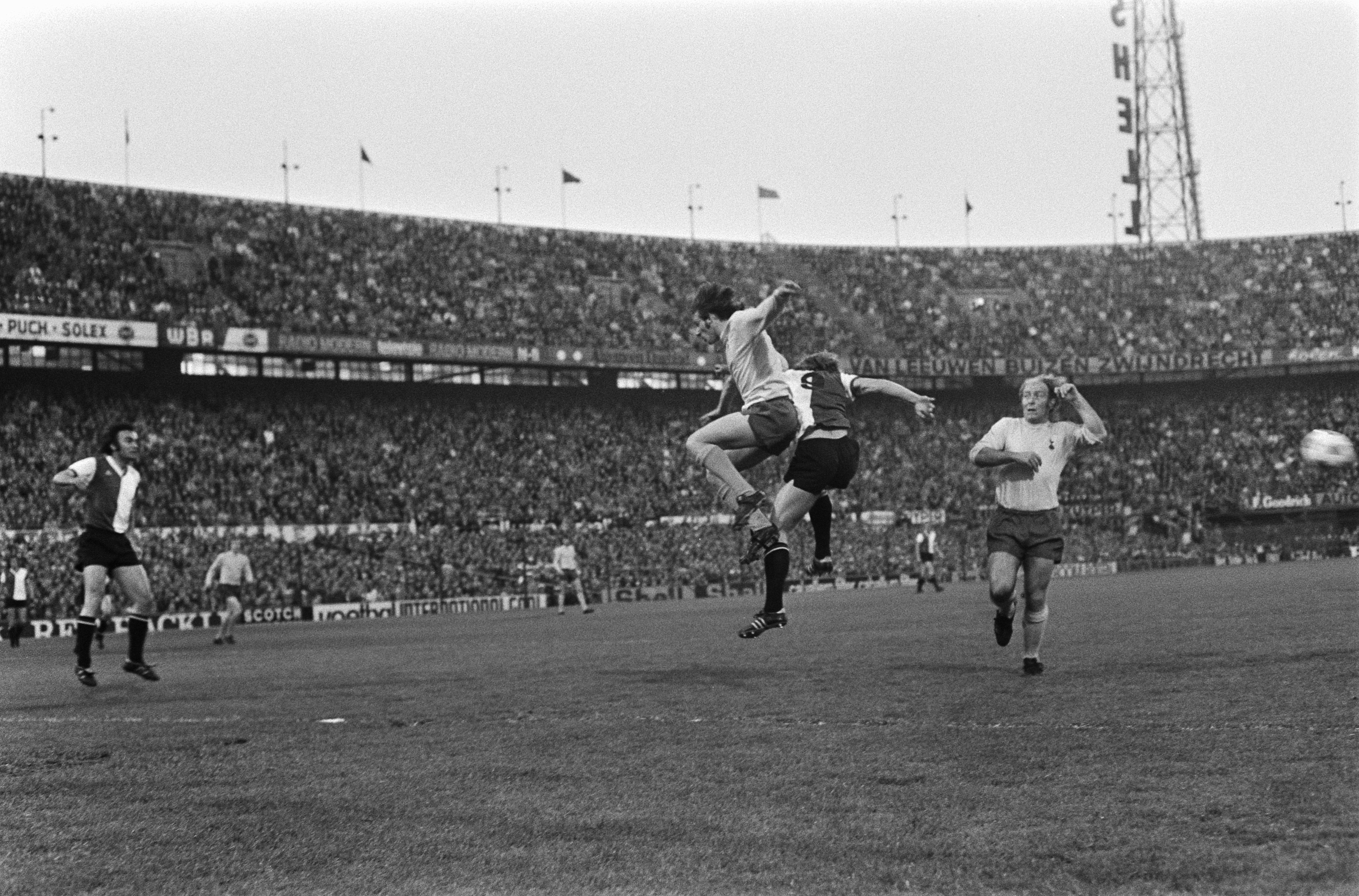
Coates (right) playing against Feyenoord in the second leg match of the 1974 UEFA Cup final

=== International ===
Appearances and goals by national team and year
National team	Year	Apps	Goals
England
England	1970	1	0
England	1971	3	0
Total		4	0

== Honours ==
Tottenham Hotspur

- Football League Cup: 1972–73
