= 1971–72 Football League =

73rd season of the Football League

The Football League
- Season: 1971–72
- Champions: Derby County
- Relegated: Barrow

The 1971–72 season was the 73rd completed season of The Football League.

Brian Clough, 37, won the first major trophy of his managerial career by guiding Derby County to their first ever league championship. They overcame Leeds United, Liverpool and Manchester City to win a four-horse race, with only a single point separating all four teams. There were later bribery allegations from The Sunday People newspaper regarding Leeds manager Don Revie and Leeds' final opponents Wolverhampton Wanderers. The footballing authorities never investigated these allegations to decide whether they were true or not.

Nottingham Forest and Huddersfield Town lost their First Division status. By the end of the decade, Forest had made an explosive comeback to the top flight. 1971-1972 was Huddersfield's last season in the top flight until their promotion in 2016-17, and within a few seasons they would be in the Fourth Division — most of their existence since 1972 has been spent in the league's lower two divisions.

In the Second Division Norwich City and Birmingham City were promoted. This was the first time that Norwich City had reached the top flight. Charlton Athletic and Watford were relegated.

Aston Villa ended their two-year spell in the Third Division by gaining promotion as champions, and by the end of the decade would be firmly re-established as a First Division club. Brighton & Hove Albion followed Villa into the Second Division, but would not reach the heady heights that the midlanders would experience. Mansfield Town, Barnsley, Torquay United and Bradford City were relegated.

Grimsby Town, Southend United, Brentford and Scunthorpe United were promoted from the Fourth Division. Barrow were voted out of the Football League and replaced by Hereford United, who a short time earlier had achieved a shock FA Cup victory over Newcastle United.

Ernie Tagg sacked himself as manager of Crewe Alexandra because he felt that a younger manager should take charge of the club.

== Final league tables and results ==
The tables below are reproduced here in the exact form that they can be found at The Rec.Sport.Soccer Statistics Foundation website and in Rothmans Book of Football League Records 1888-89 to 1978-79, with home and away statistics separated.

Beginning with the season 1894–95, clubs finishing level on points were separated according to goal average (goals scored divided by goals conceded), or more properly put, goal ratio. In case one or more teams had the same goal difference, this system favoured those teams who had scored fewer goals. The goal average system was eventually scrapped beginning with the 1976-77 season.

Since the Fourth Division was established in the 1958–59 season, the bottom four teams of that division have been required to apply for re-election.

== First Division ==
First Division
- Season: 1971–72
- Champions: Derby County; 1st title
- Relegated: Nottingham Forest; Huddersfield Town
- European Cup: Derby County
- Cup Winners' Cup: Leeds United
- UEFA Cup: Liverpool; Manchester City; Tottenham Hotspur; Stoke City
- Watney Cup: Wolverhampton Wanderers; Sheffield United
- Matches: 462
- Goals: 1,160 (2.51 per match)
- Top goalscorer: Francis Lee (33 goals)
- Biggest home win: Everton 8–0 Southampton (20 November 1971)
- Biggest away win: Sheffield United 0–5 Arsenal (29 January 1972)
- Highest scoring: Everton 8–0 Southampton (20 November 1971)

Pos	Team	Pld	W	D	L	GF	GA	GAv	Pts	Qualification or relegation
1	Derby County (C)	42	24	10	8	69	33	2.091	58	Qualification for the European Cup first round
2	Leeds United	42	24	9	9	73	31	2.355	57	Qualification for the Cup Winners' Cup first round (Note: Leeds United qualified for the European Cup Winners' Cup as the 1971-72 FA Cup winners.)
3	Liverpool	42	24	9	9	64	30	2.133	57	Qualification for the UEFA Cup first round
4	Manchester City	42	23	11	8	77	45	1.711	57	Qualification for the UEFA Cup first round
5	Arsenal	42	22	8	12	58	40	1.450	52	
6	Tottenham Hotspur	42	19	13	10	63	42	1.500	51	Qualification for the UEFA Cup first round (Note: Tottenham Hotspur qualified for the UEFA Cup as the 1971-72 UEFA Cup winners.)
7	Chelsea	42	18	12	12	58	49	1.184	48	
8	Manchester United	42	19	10	13	69	61	1.131	48	Declined place in Watney Cup
9	Wolverhampton Wanderers	42	18	11	13	65	57	1.140	47	Qualification for the Watney Cup (Note: Wolverhampton Wanderers and Sheffield United qualified for the Watney Cup as the two teams with the most goals that hadn't already qualified for a European competition. (Manchester United would have qualified, but declined their place in the competition.))
10	Sheffield United	42	17	12	13	61	60	1.017	46	Qualification for the Watney Cup
11	Newcastle United	42	15	11	16	49	52	0.942	41	
12	Leicester City	42	13	13	16	41	46	0.891	39	
13	Ipswich Town	42	11	16	15	39	53	0.736	38	
14	West Ham United	42	12	12	18	47	51	0.922	36	
15	Everton	42	9	18	15	37	48	0.771	36	
16	West Bromwich Albion	42	12	11	19	42	54	0.778	35	
17	Stoke City	42	10	15	17	39	56	0.696	35	Qualification for the UEFA Cup first round
18	Coventry City	42	9	15	18	44	67	0.657	33	
19	Southampton	42	12	7	23	52	80	0.650	31	
20	Crystal Palace	42	8	13	21	39	65	0.600	29	
21	Nottingham Forest (R)	42	8	9	25	47	81	0.580	25	Relegation to the Second Division
22	Huddersfield Town (R)	42	6	13	23	27	59	0.458	25	Relegation to the Second Division

Source: World Football
Rules for classification: 1) Points; 2) Goal average; 3) Goals scored
(C) Champions; (R) Relegated

=== Results ===
Home \ Away	ARS	CHE	COV	CRY	DER	EVE	HUD	IPS	LEE	LEI	LIV	MCI	MUN	NEW	NOT	SHU	SOU	STK	TOT	WBA	WHU	WOL
Arsenal		3–0	2–0	2–1	2–0	1–1	1–0	2–1	2–0	3–0	0–0	1–2	3–0	4–2	3–0	0–1	1–0	0–1	0–2	2–0	2–1	2–1
Chelsea	1–2		3–3	2–1	1–1	4–0	2–2	2–0	0–0	2–1	0–0	2–2	2–3	3–3	2–0	2–0	3–0	2–0	1–0	1–0	3–1	3–1
Coventry City	0–1	1–1		1–1	2–2	4–1	2–1	1–1	3–1	1–1	0–2	1–1	2–3	1–0	1–1	3–2	1–0	1–1	1–0	0–2	1–1	0–0
Crystal Palace	2–2	2–3	2–2		0–1	2–1	0–0	1–1	1–1	1–1	0–1	1–2	1–3	2–0	1–1	5–1	2–3	2–0	1–1	0–2	0–3	0–2
Derby County	2–1	1–0	1–0	3–0		2–0	3–0	1–0	2–0	3–0	1–0	3–1	2–2	0–1	4–0	3–0	2–2	4–0	2–2	0–0	2–0	2–1
Everton	2–1	2–0	1–2	0–0	0–2		2–2	1–1	0–0	0–0	1–0	1–2	1–0	1–0	1–1	0–1	8–0	0–0	1–1	2–1	2–1	2–2
Huddersfield Town	0–1	1–2	0–1	0–1	2–1	0–0		1–3	2–1	2–2	0–1	1–1	0–3	0–0	0–1	0–0	0–2	0–0	1–1	1–0	1–0	0–1
Ipswich Town	0–1	1–2	3–1	0–2	0–0	0–0	1–0		0–2	1–2	0–0	2–1	0–0	0–0	1–1	0–0	1–1	2–1	2–1	2–3	1–0	2–1
Leeds United	3–0	2–0	1–0	2–0	3–0	3–2	3–1	2–2		2–1	1–0	3–0	5–1	5–1	6–1	1–0	7–0	1–0	1–1	3–0	0–0	0–0
Leicester City	0–0	1–1	1–0	0–0	0–2	0–0	2–0	1–0	0–0		1–0	0–0	2–0	3–0	2–1	0–1	0–1	2–1	0–1	0–1	2–0	1–2
Liverpool	3–2	0–0	3–1	4–1	3–2	4–0	2–0	2–0	0–2	3–2		3–0	2–2	5–0	3–1	2–0	1–0	2–1	0–0	2–0	1–0	3–2
Manchester City	2–0	1–0	4–0	4–0	2–0	1–0	1–0	4–0	0–1	1–1	1–0		3–3	2–1	2–2	2–1	3–0	1–2	4–0	2–1	3–1	5–2
Manchester United	3–1	0–1	2–2	4–0	1–0	0–0	2–0	1–0	0–1	3–2	0–3	1–3		0–2	3–2	2–0	3–2	3–0	3–1	3–1	4–2	1–3
Newcastle United	2–0	0–0	4–2	1–2	0–1	0–0	0–0	0–1	1–0	2–0	3–2	0–0	0–1		2–1	1–2	3–1	0–0	3–1	4–2	2–2	2–0
Nottingham Forest	1–1	2–1	4–0	0–1	0–2	1–0	1–2	0–2	0–2	1–2	2–3	2–2	0–0	1–0		2–3	2–3	0–0	0–1	4–1	1–0	1–3
Sheffield United	0–5	1–0	2–0	1–0	0–4	1–1	3–1	7–0	3–0	1–1	1–1	3–3	1–1	1–0	2–1		3–1	2–3	2–2	0–0	3–0	2–2
Southampton	0–1	2–2	3–1	1–0	1–2	0–1	1–2	0–0	2–1	1–0	0–1	2–0	2–5	1–2	4–1	3–2		3–1	0–0	1–1	3–3	1–2
Stoke City	0–0	0–1	1–0	3–1	1–1	1–1	1–0	3–3	0–3	3–1	0–0	1–3	1–1	3–3	0–2	2–2	3–1		2–0	1–1	0–0	0–1
Tottenham Hotspur	1–1	3–0	1–0	3–0	0–1	3–0	4–1	2–1	1–0	4–3	2–0	1–1	2–0	0–0	6–1	2–0	1–0	2–0		3–2	0–1	4–1
West Bromwich Albion	0–1	4–0	1–1	1–1	0–0	2–0	1–1	1–2	0–1	0–1	1–0	0–2	2–1	0–3	1–0	2–2	3–2	0–1	1–1		0–0	2–3
West Ham United	0–0	2–1	4–0	1–1	3–3	1–0	3–0	0–0	2–2	1–1	0–2	0–2	3–0	0–1	4–2	1–2	1–0	2–1	2–0	0–1		1–0
Wolverhampton Wanderers	5–1	0–2	1–1	1–0	2–1	1–1	2–2	2–2	2–1	0–1	0–0	2–1	1–1	2–0	4–2	1–2	4–2	2–0	2–2	0–1	1–0	

Updated to match(es) played on unknown. Source: Ian Laschke: Rothmans Book of Football League Records 1888–89 to 1978–79. Macdonald and Jane's, London & Sydney, 1980.
Legend: Blue = home team win; Yellow = draw; Red = away team win.

=== Maps ===
Locations of the Football League First Division London teams 1971–1972
Locations of the Football League First Division 1971–1972 teams

== Second Division ==
Second Division
- Season: 1971–72
- Champions: Norwich City
- Promoted: Norwich City; Birmingham City
- Relegated: Charlton Athletic; Watford
- Watney Cup: Blackpool; Burnley
- Matches: 462
- Goals: 1,194 (2.58 per match)
- Top goalscorer: Bob Latchford (23 goals)
- Biggest home win: Burnley 6–1 Orient (28 September 1971); Cardiff City 6–1 Charlton Athletic (23 October 1971); Blackpool 5–0 Watford (1 January 1972); Orient 5–0 Sunderland (8 January 1972); Sunderland 5–0 Watford (17 April 1972); Blackpool 5–0 Charlton Athletic (29 April 1972)
- Biggest away win: Sheffield Wednesday 1–5 Bristol City (21 April 1972)
- Highest scoring: Portsmouth 6–3 Fulham (23 October 1971); Birmingham City 6–3 Portsmouth (8 January 1972)

Pos	Team	Pld	W	D	L	GF	GA	GAv	Pts	Qualification or relegation
1	Norwich City (C, P)	42	21	15	6	60	36	1.667	57	Promotion to the First Division
2	Birmingham City (P)	42	19	18	5	60	31	1.935	56	Promotion to the First Division
3	Millwall	42	19	17	6	64	46	1.391	55	
4	Queens Park Rangers	42	20	14	8	57	28	2.036	54	
5	Sunderland	42	17	16	9	67	57	1.175	50	
6	Blackpool	42	20	7	15	70	50	1.400	47	Qualification for the Watney Cup
7	Burnley	42	20	6	16	70	55	1.273	46	Qualification for the Watney Cup
8	Bristol City	42	18	10	14	61	49	1.245	46	
9	Middlesbrough	42	19	8	15	50	48	1.042	46	
10	Carlisle United	42	17	9	16	61	57	1.070	43	
11	Swindon Town	42	15	12	15	47	47	1.000	42	
12	Hull City	42	14	10	18	49	53	0.925	38	
13	Luton Town	42	10	18	14	43	48	0.896	38	
14	Sheffield Wednesday	42	13	12	17	51	58	0.879	38	
15	Oxford United	42	12	14	16	43	55	0.782	38	
16	Portsmouth	42	12	13	17	59	68	0.868	37	
17	Orient	42	14	9	19	50	61	0.820	37	
18	Preston North End	42	12	12	18	52	58	0.897	36	
19	Cardiff City	42	10	14	18	56	69	0.812	34	
20	Fulham	42	12	10	20	45	68	0.662	34	
21	Charlton Athletic (R)	42	12	9	21	55	77	0.714	33	Relegation to the Third Division
22	Watford (R)	42	5	9	28	24	75	0.320	19	Relegation to the Third Division

Rules for classification: 1) Points; 2) Goal average; 3) Goals scored
(C) Champions; (P) Promoted; (R) Relegated

=== Results ===
Home \ Away	BIR	BLP	BRI	BUR	CAR	CRL	CHA	FUL	HUL	LUT	MID	MIL	NWC	ORI	OXF	POR	PNE	QPR	SHW	SUN	SWI	WAT
Birmingham City		2–1	1–0	2–0	3–0	3–2	4–1	3–1	2–0	1–0	1–1	1–0	4–0	2–0	0–0	6–3	2–2	0–0	0–0	1–1	4–1	4–1
Blackpool	1–1		1–0	4–2	3–0	2–0	5–0	2–1	1–1	0–1	3–1	0–0	1–2	4–1	2–0	1–2	1–1	1–1	1–0	1–1	4–1	5–0
Bristol City	1–0	4–0		0–2	2–0	1–4	2–0	1–2	4–0	0–0	2–1	3–3	0–1	5–3	4–2	1–1	4–1	2–0	1–0	3–1	1–0	2–1
Burnley	1–1	2–1	1–1		3–0	3–1	3–1	1–1	0–2	2–1	5–2	2–0	1–0	6–1	1–1	1–3	1–0	1–0	5–3	0–1	1–2	3–0
Cardiff City	0–0	3–4	2–3	2–2		3–1	6–1	1–0	1–1	1–1	1–0	1–2	0–0	1–0	1–1	3–2	5–2	0–0	3–2	1–2	0–1	2–0
Carlisle United	2–2	2–0	2–0	0–3	2–1		5–2	3–1	2–1	0–0	3–0	3–3	3–0	2–0	2–1	1–0	0–0	1–4	2–2	1–2	0–0	2–0
Charlton Athletic	1–1	2–3	2–0	2–0	2–2	1–1		2–2	1–0	2–0	0–2	0–2	0–2	1–2	3–0	1–1	2–1	2–1	2–2	2–2	3–1	2–0
Fulham	0–0	2–1	2–0	0–2	4–3	0–1	1–0		1–0	3–1	2–2	1–0	0–0	2–1	1–1	1–1	0–0	0–3	4–0	0–0	2–4	3–0
Hull City	1–0	1–0	1–1	1–2	0–0	2–0	2–3	4–0		0–0	4–3	0–0	1–2	1–1	1–0	1–3	3–2	1–1	1–0	2–3	2–0	4–0
Luton Town	0–0	1–4	0–0	1–0	2–2	0–2	1–2	2–0	0–1		3–2	2–1	1–1	2–0	1–2	3–2	1–1	1–1	3–1	1–2	0–0	0–0
Middlesbrough	0–0	1–0	1–0	1–0	1–0	2–2	2–2	2–0	3–0	0–0		1–0	1–0	1–0	2–1	2–1	0–1	3–2	2–1	2–0	2–0	2–1
Millwall	3–0	1–0	3–1	1–1	1–1	2–1	2–1	4–1	2–1	2–2	1–0		2–1	2–1	2–0	1–0	2–0	0–0	1–1	1–1	2–2	3–2
Norwich City	2–2	5–1	2–2	3–0	2–1	1–0	3–0	2–1	2–0	3–1	2–0	2–2		0–0	3–2	3–1	1–1	0–0	1–0	1–1	1–0	1–1
Orient	0–1	0–1	2–0	1–0	4–1	2–1	3–2	1–0	1–0	0–0	1–1	2–2	1–2		1–1	2–1	3–2	2–0	0–3	5–0	0–1	1–0
Oxford United	0–1	3–1	0–0	2–1	1–0	3–1	2–1	1–0	2–2	1–1	0–0	1–2	0–2	1–1		2–2	2–0	3–1	1–0	2–0	1–1	0–0
Portsmouth	1–0	1–3	1–1	1–2	2–0	1–0	0–0	6–3	0–0	0–3	2–1	1–1	2–1	3–2	2–0		1–1	1–0	1–2	2–2	1–2	2–2
Preston North End	0–0	1–4	1–0	1–3	1–2	3–0	2–1	2–0	3–1	0–1	1–0	4–0	0–2	1–1	1–0	4–0		1–1	1–0	1–3	2–2	2–0
Queens Park Rangers	1–0	0–1	3–0	3–1	3–0	3–0	2–0	0–0	2–1	1–0	1–0	1–1	0–0	1–0	4–2	1–1	2–1		3–0	2–1	3–0	3–0
Sheffield Wednesday	1–2	1–2	1–5	2–1	2–2	2–1	2–1	4–0	2–1	2–2	1–0	1–1	1–1	3–1	0–0	1–1	1–0	0–0		3–0	1–0	2–1
Sunderland	1–1	0–0	1–1	4–3	1–1	0–3	3–0	2–1	0–1	2–2	4–1	3–3	1–1	2–0	3–0	3–2	4–3	0–1	2–0		1–0	5–0
Swindon Town	1–1	1–0	0–1	0–1	3–1	0–0	2–1	4–0	2–1	2–1	0–1	0–2	0–1	2–2	4–0	3–1	1–1	0–0	1–0	1–1		2–0
Watford	0–1	1–0	0–2	2–1	2–2	1–2	0–3	1–2	1–2	2–1	0–1	0–1	1–1	0–1	0–1	1–0	1–0	0–2	1–1	1–1	0–0	

Updated to match(es) played on unknown. Source: Ian Laschke: Rothmans Book of Football League Records 1888–89 to 1978–79. Macdonald and Jane's, London & Sydney, 1980.
Legend: Blue = home team win; Yellow = draw; Red = away team win.

=== Maps ===
Locations of the Football League Second Division London teams 1971–1972
Locations of the Football League Second Division 1971–1972 teams

== Third Division ==
Third Division
- Season: 1971–72
- Champions: Aston Villa
- Promoted: Aston Villa; Brighton & Hove Albion
- Relegated: Mansfield Town; Barnsley; Torquay United; Bradford City
- Cup Winners' Cup: Wrexham
- Watney Cup: Notts County; Bristol Rovers
- Matches: 552
- Goals: 1,407 (2.55 per match)
- Top goalscorer: Ted MacDougall (35 goals)
- Highest attendance: 48,110, Aston Villa v Bournemouth

Pos	Team	Pld	W	D	L	GF	GA	GAv	Pts	Qualification or relegation
1	Aston Villa (C, P)	46	32	6	8	85	32	2.656	70	Promotion to the Second Division
2	Brighton & Hove Albion (P)	46	27	11	8	82	47	1.745	65	Promotion to the Second Division
3	Bournemouth	46	23	16	7	73	37	1.973	62	
4	Notts County	46	25	12	9	74	44	1.682	62	Qualification for the Watney Cup
5	Rotherham United	46	20	15	11	69	52	1.327	55	
6	Bristol Rovers	46	21	12	13	75	56	1.339	54	Qualification for the Watney Cup
7	Bolton Wanderers	46	17	16	13	51	41	1.244	50	
8	Plymouth Argyle	46	20	10	16	74	64	1.156	50	
9	Walsall	46	15	18	13	62	57	1.088	48	
10	Blackburn Rovers	46	19	9	18	54	57	0.947	47	
11	Oldham Athletic	46	17	11	18	59	63	0.937	45	
12	Shrewsbury Town	46	17	10	19	73	65	1.123	44	
13	Chesterfield	46	18	8	20	57	57	1.000	44	
14	Swansea City	46	17	10	19	46	59	0.780	44	
15	Port Vale	46	13	15	18	43	59	0.729	41	
16	Wrexham	46	16	8	22	59	63	0.937	40	Qualification for the Cup Winners' Cup first round
17	Halifax Town	46	13	12	21	48	61	0.787	38	
18	Rochdale	46	12	13	21	57	83	0.687	37	
19	York City	46	12	12	22	57	66	0.864	36	
20	Tranmere Rovers	46	10	16	20	50	71	0.704	36	
21	Mansfield Town (R)	46	8	20	18	41	63	0.651	36	Relegation to the Fourth Division
22	Barnsley (R)	46	9	18	19	32	64	0.500	36	Relegation to the Fourth Division
23	Torquay United (R)	46	10	12	24	41	69	0.594	32	Relegation to the Fourth Division
24	Bradford City (R)	46	11	10	25	45	77	0.584	32	Relegation to the Fourth Division

Rules for classification: 1) Points; 2) Goal average; 3) Goals scored
(C) Champions; (P) Promoted; (R) Relegated

=== Results ===
Home \ Away	BOU	AST	BAR	BLB	BOL	BRA	B&HA	BRR	CHF	HAL	MAN	NTC	OLD	PLY	PTV	ROC	ROT	SHR	SWA	TOR	TRA	WAL	WRE	YOR
AFC Bournemouth		3–0	0–0	1–0	1–2	3–0	1–1	2–0	1–0	3–1	1–1	2–0	2–0	1–0	3–2	4–1	3–1	3–1	2–1	1–0	0–0	0–0	4–0	2–2
Aston Villa	2–1		2–0	4–1	3–2	3–0	2–0	2–1	1–0	1–0	0–1	1–0	1–0	3–1	2–0	2–0	1–2	3–0	2–0	5–1	2–0	0–0	2–0	1–0
Barnsley	0–0	0–4		0–0	1–0	0–2	0–1	0–0	1–4	1–2	1–1	2–1	2–1	2–2	0–0	3–3	1–1	1–3	0–1	0–0	0–0	4–2	2–1	2–1
Blackburn Rovers	2–1	1–1	4–0		0–3	1–0	2–2	1–2	1–0	2–0	1–1	0–2	0–1	3–2	3–1	3–0	2–1	1–0	1–2	1–0	4–1	1–1	2–1	3–0
Bolton Wanderers	0–0	2–0	0–0	1–0		0–0	1–1	0–0	1–0	1–1	2–0	1–2	2–1	2–1	3–0	2–1	2–2	2–0	0–0	2–0	1–0	0–1	0–2	0–1
Bradford City	2–2	0–1	0–2	1–2	0–3		2–1	1–1	2–2	2–1	2–2	2–3	2–2	0–1	0–0	1–1	1–0	2–1	0–2	0–1	1–1	3–0	0–2	3–1
Brighton & Hove Albion	2–0	2–1	0–0	3–0	1–1	3–1		3–1	2–1	2–1	1–0	1–1	0–1	3–0	1–1	1–1	2–1	2–0	1–0	3–1	2–0	1–2	3–2	0–2
Bristol Rovers	1–2	0–1	3–0	3–0	2–0	7–1	2–2		3–1	1–0	2–1	0–2	1–0	2–2	2–1	5–2	1–2	3–1	2–1	2–0	2–1	2–1	3–1	5–4
Chesterfield	0–0	0–4	0–0	2–0	2–1	0–1	0–1	1–3		2–1	2–0	1–2	0–1	2–1	2–1	2–0	0–1	0–0	1–2	2–0	2–2	1–1	1–0	2–1
Halifax Town	1–0	0–1	2–0	0–1	0–1	2–1	0–5	2–1	2–0		1–1	3–1	0–0	0–1	2–0	2–2	1–1	0–0	0–1	0–0	3–2	3–1	4–1	3–1
Mansfield Town	0–5	1–1	0–0	1–0	1–0	1–1	0–3	0–0	2–1	0–0		1–1	2–1	2–3	0–1	3–1	0–1	2–2	0–2	0–0	1–1	1–1	1–1	0–0
Notts County	1–1	0–3	3–0	1–0	1–2	2–0	1–0	2–3	1–4	3–1	2–0		2–0	1–0	2–1	4–0	1–1	1–0	5–0	2–1	1–0	3–0	1–0	2–2
Oldham Athletic	3–1	0–6	6–0	1–1	2–2	0–2	2–4	3–2	1–1	0–0	2–1	0–1		0–1	1–0	3–2	5–1	1–4	1–0	1–0	3–1	1–3	0–2	1–0
Plymouth Argyle	1–1	3–2	2–1	1–0	2–0	1–4	1–2	2–1	1–0	1–1	3–1	1–1	0–0		0–0	4–1	2–1	1–2	4–1	3–1	2–2	3–2	1–2	4–0
Port Vale	1–1	4–4	1–0	0–0	1–1	1–0	1–1	0–0	0–2	1–0	1–0	0–3	1–0	0–0		1–1	1–2	2–1	3–0	0–0	2–1	1–1	1–0	4–3
Rochdale	1–1	1–0	0–2	2–1	2–2	0–1	1–2	3–1	0–2	3–2	2–1	1–1	1–1	3–2	3–2		2–1	0–0	1–1	5–0	2–1	0–0	1–0	1–2
Rotherham United	0–0	0–2	3–0	2–1	2–0	2–0	2–4	0–0	0–1	3–2	3–1	2–2	3–1	4–3	3–0	5–1		2–1	4–0	2–2	0–0	1–1	2–2	1–1
Shrewsbury Town	3–2	1–1	1–0	7–1	1–0	3–0	3–5	2–2	3–4	3–0	4–2	1–1	2–4	1–2	0–0	2–1	0–1		3–0	2–0	0–0	4–1	2–1	2–1
Swansea City	1–2	1–2	2–0	0–1	3–2	2–0	2–1	2–0	1–3	3–0	1–1	1–1	0–0	1–1	0–1	1–0	0–2	1–0		0–0	1–1	2–0	0–2	2–1
Torquay United	0–2	2–1	1–2	3–1	1–1	2–1	2–2	1–1	3–2	2–0	0–1	1–1	0–2	2–1	3–0	1–1	0–1	2–0	1–4		0–1	2–2	2–3	0–1
Tranmere Rovers	1–2	0–1	0–0	1–3	0–0	4–1	2–0	0–1	1–2	2–3	2–2	2–1	2–2	3–2	3–2	2–0	0–0	0–4	0–0	2–0		3–3	2–1	2–0
Walsall	1–1	1–1	1–1	0–0	1–1	3–0	0–1	2–0	1–1	0–0	2–1	1–2	2–3	1–0	2–0	3–0	0–0	4–1	4–0	1–0	4–1		2–1	2–1
Wrexham	1–3	0–2	2–0	1–1	1–2	2–1	1–2	1–1	2–0	2–0	1–1	1–1	3–1	0–2	1–2	1–3	0–0	2–1	2–0	1–2	3–0	3–1		2–0
York City	0–2	0–1	1–1	0–1	0–0	3–1	1–2	0–0	4–1	1–1	1–2	0–2	0–0	2–3	2–1	2–0	2–0	1–1	1–1	3–1	5–0	2–0	1–1	

Updated to match(es) played on unknown. Source: Ian Laschke: Rothmans Book of Football League Records 1888–89 to 1978–79. Macdonald and Jane's, London & Sydney, 1980.
Legend: Blue = home team win; Yellow = draw; Red = away team win.
- The match between Tranmere Rovers and Walsall on the 27th of March 1972 looked to be heading towards a dull and boring 0-0 draw, when 6 goals were scored in the final 16 minutes of the match, resulting in a 3-3 draw.

=== Maps ===
Locations of the Football League Third Division teams 1971–1972

== Fourth Division ==
Football League Fourth Division
- Season: 1971–72
- Champions: Grimsby Town (1st title)
- Promoted: Brentford, Scunthorpe United, Southend United
- Failed re-election: Barrow
- Matches: 552
- Goals: 1,496 (2.71 per match)
- Top goalscorer: Peter Price (Peterborough United), 28

Pos	Team	Pld	W	D	L	GF	GA	GAv	Pts	Promotion or relegation
1	Grimsby Town (C, P)	46	28	7	11	88	56	1.571	63	Promotion to the Third Division
2	Southend United (P)	46	24	12	10	81	55	1.473	60	Promotion to the Third Division
3	Brentford (P)	46	24	11	11	76	44	1.727	59	Promotion to the Third Division
4	Scunthorpe United (P)	46	22	13	11	56	37	1.514	57	Promotion to the Third Division
5	Lincoln City	46	21	14	11	77	59	1.305	56	Qualified for the Watney Cup (Note: The two teams who scored the most goals in each division, and did not qualify for Europe and were not promoted, qualified for the Watney Cup.)
6	Workington	46	16	19	11	50	34	1.471	51	
7	Southport	46	18	14	14	66	46	1.435	50	
8	Peterborough United	46	17	16	13	82	64	1.281	50	Qualified for the Watney Cup
9	Bury	46	19	12	15	73	59	1.237	50	
10	Cambridge United	46	17	14	15	62	60	1.033	48	
11	Colchester United	46	19	10	17	70	69	1.014	48	
12	Doncaster Rovers	46	16	14	16	56	63	0.889	46	
13	Gillingham	46	16	13	17	61	67	0.910	45	
14	Newport County	46	18	8	20	60	72	0.833	44	
15	Exeter City	46	16	11	19	61	68	0.897	43	
16	Reading	46	17	8	21	56	76	0.737	42	
17	Aldershot	46	9	22	15	48	54	0.889	40	
18	Hartlepool	46	17	6	23	58	69	0.841	40	
19	Darlington	46	14	11	21	64	82	0.780	39	
20	Chester	46	10	18	18	47	56	0.839	38	
21	Northampton Town	46	12	13	21	66	79	0.835	37	Re-elected
22	Barrow (R)	46	13	11	22	40	71	0.563	37	Failed re-election and demoted to the Northern Premier League
23	Stockport County	46	9	14	23	55	87	0.632	32	Re-elected
24	Crewe Alexandra	46	10	9	27	43	69	0.623	29	Re-elected

Source: rsssf.com
(C) Champions; (P) Promoted; (R) Relegated

=== Results ===
Home \ Away	ALD	BRW	BRE	BRY	CAM	CHE	COL	CRE	DAR	DON	EXE	GIL	GRI	HAR	LIN	NPC	NOR	PET	REA	SCU	STD	SOU	STP	WRK
Aldershot		1–1	1–2	2–2	1–1	0–0	0–2	0–0	3–0	3–0	0–0	0–2	1–1	2–0	0–0	3–0	0–2	1–1	1–2	1–1	0–0	1–1	4–0	2–2
Barrow	1–1		0–3	1–1	1–1	2–0	2–2	2–1	0–4	1–2	0–0	1–0	0–0	2–0	2–2	1–0	0–1	0–2	0–0	0–1	2–1	0–2	3–2	2–0
Brentford	1–1	4–0		2–0	2–1	1–1	0–2	1–0	6–2	2–1	1–0	1–3	2–0	6–0	2–0	3–1	6–1	5–1	1–2	0–3	1–2	1–0	2–0	2–0
Bury	3–1	4–0	0–2		0–1	3–1	3–0	2–0	3–2	3–3	4–3	5–0	1–1	1–1	0–1	3–0	4–2	1–1	2–1	3–1	2–0	2–1	4–0	2–0
Cambridge United	1–1	1–0	1–1	0–2		2–0	4–2	3–2	6–0	1–1	0–1	2–1	3–1	2–1	0–0	0–1	1–1	2–5	4–1	2–0	1–1	0–0	2–0	0–0
Chester	0–0	0–0	0–0	2–0	1–1		2–1	0–0	2–1	1–1	1–2	5–1	1–2	4–0	2–1	3–0	3–2	1–1	2–0	0–0	1–1	1–1	0–0	2–1
Colchester United	1–0	0–1	1–1	0–0	1–1	1–0		4–2	4–3	1–2	3–0	2–2	0–1	1–0	5–2	2–3	2–0	1–1	2–1	1–1	1–0	1–0	3–2	1–0
Crewe Alexandra	2–1	1–0	2–1	0–0	1–1	3–1	2–4		1–1	0–1	0–1	0–1	0–1	1–2	3–1	1–2	0–1	2–0	2–0	0–2	1–2	2–1	3–1	0–0
Darlington	4–2	0–1	0–0	0–0	2–1	1–1	2–0	1–1		4–1	2–1	0–0	3–2	1–2	3–3	0–0	5–2	1–1	1–0	0–1	2–3	0–0	1–2	4–0
Doncaster Rovers	2–1	0–1	0–3	4–1	1–1	0–0	2–0	0–0	4–0		2–1	1–1	2–1	2–1	2–0	4–2	1–1	3–2	1–1	0–2	0–2	2–1	2–2	0–0
Exeter City	1–0	7–1	0–1	3–2	3–4	1–1	3–3	3–1	3–0	1–0		1–1	3–4	1–0	1–2	1–0	1–3	3–2	0–0	1–0	0–0	1–3	2–0	0–2
Gillingham	0–1	1–1	0–1	2–0	2–0	1–0	0–2	2–1	4–2	2–0	0–2		0–1	1–0	3–3	1–2	4–1	1–1	4–2	0–1	0–0	2–1	3–2	0–0
Grimsby Town	3–3	2–0	3–1	4–1	2–1	1–0	3–0	2–3	2–0	3–1	3–0	2–1		3–2	2–2	4–2	4–2	3–2	2–0	4–1	4–1	0–1	4–1	1–1
Hartlepool	0–1	4–3	1–2	3–1	1–2	2–1	3–2	1–0	2–3	0–0	1–0	3–1	0–1		2–1	0–1	2–0	1–0	3–1	1–0	2–2	1–0	5–0	1–3
Lincoln City	2–2	3–2	4–1	2–0	3–1	4–0	2–0	0–0	0–1	2–0	4–1	1–1	3–0	2–1		3–1	2–0	3–2	0–0	1–0	0–0	2–1	2–1	1–0
Newport County	2–3	2–1	0–0	2–1	3–0	1–0	2–1	2–0	4–0	1–3	0–0	1–2	2–1	0–2	2–0		1–1	1–1	2–1	1–0	2–0	2–2	1–0	0–1
Northampton Town	2–3	2–0	0–0	2–2	1–2	4–2	1–1	4–1	1–2	1–1	1–1	6–1	3–0	2–1	2–3	1–1		1–1	5–0	0–2	1–1	0–0	2–0	1–2
Peterborough United	0–0	7–0	2–2	2–0	2–0	2–0	4–0	2–0	1–3	2–0	3–3	2–1	0–2	2–2	4–4	3–1	1–0		3–2	0–1	2–0	2–0	4–2	1–1
Reading	2–0	1–0	2–1	0–2	1–0	1–0	2–4	1–0	2–0	3–1	3–1	1–2	1–3	3–0	0–1	4–2	2–1	2–1		2–0	1–4	1–1	2–2	0–0
Scunthorpe United	1–0	2–1	0–0	3–0	2–1	2–0	2–0	2–0	3–1	0–0	3–0	3–3	1–2	2–2	2–1	1–0	0–0	0–0	1–1		1–1	1–0	0–2	2–0
Southend	1–0	1–0	3–1	0–0	1–2	4–2	1–4	4–1	3–0	2–1	3–0	2–2	3–1	3–1	2–1	3–1	4–1	2–1	4–1	2–3		2–1	4–2	2–0
Southport	0–0	1–0	0–0	0–1	4–1	4–3	3–0	4–2	2–1	3–0	4–0	1–0	1–0	1–0	1–1	4–2	4–0	2–4	5–2	1–1	0–1		1–0	2–2
Stockport County	0–0	1–3	0–1	2–2	3–0	0–0	2–2	3–1	2–1	1–2	0–4	2–1	0–2	2–1	4–2	4–4	3–1	0–0	0–1	0–0	2–2	1–1		1–1
Workington	5–0	0–1	3–0	1–0	0–1	0–0	1–0	1–0	0–0	2–0	0–0	1–1	0–0	0–0	0–0	3–0	2–0	4–1	5–0	2–1	3–1	0–0	1–1	

Updated to match(es) played on unknown. Source: Ian Laschke: Rothmans Book of Football League Records 1888–89 to 1978–79. Macdonald and Jane's, London & Sydney, 1980.
Legend: Blue = home team win; Yellow = draw; Red = away team win.

=== Maps ===
Locations of the Football League Fourth Division teams 1971–1972

== Attendances ==
=== Division One ===
No.	Club	Average	±	Highest	Lowest
1	Liverpool FC	47,687	4,6%	55,634	39,538
2	Manchester United	45,999	4,7%	56,362	23,146
3	Arsenal FC	40,500	-7,5%	52,102	27,172
4	Tottenham Hotspur FC	38,834	8,9%	54,814	19,631
5	Chelsea FC	38,783	-1,9%	54,663	23,443
6	Manchester City FC	38,573	24,3%	63,326	25,677
7	Everton FC	37,242	-9,4%	56,293	21,513
8	Leeds United FC	35,637	-9,1%	46,565	18,417
9	Sheffield United FC	33,189	31,4%	45,045	23,250
10	Derby County FC	33,087	5,5%	39,159	26,738
11	Newcastle United FC	32,664	9,8%	55,603	18,927
12	West Ham United FC	30,005	0,1%	41,892	18,479
13	Leicester City FC	28,536	10,0%	37,564	19,769
14	Wolverhampton Wanderers FC	27,983	1,4%	53,379	17,041
15	Crystal Palace FC	26,973	-6,6%	43,720	17,699
16	West Bromwich Albion FC	25,786	0,4%	46,992	16,702
17	Stoke City FC	24,204	21,6%	43,007	13,907
18	Coventry City FC	23,724	-8,9%	37,798	16,309
19	Nottingham Forest FC	21,433	-8,1%	42,750	9,872
20	Southampton FC	21,191	-4,8%	30,323	16,958
21	Ipswich Town FC	20,924	2,4%	29,213	15,524
22	Huddersfield Town AFC	15,940	-31,4%	33,458	9,459

=== Division Two ===
No.	Club	Average	±	Highest	Lowest
1	Birmingham City	32,337	33,6%	45,181	22,410
2	Norwich City	23,037	82,0%	34,914	10,967
3	Middlesbrough FC	17,943	-3,2%	34,446	9,539
4	Sheffield Wednesday	17,087	8,3%	31,890	12,350
5	Millwall	16,262	64,9%	24,376	11,569
6	Sunderland AFC	15,906	0,8%	28,129	8,273
7	Cardiff City	15,510	-27,9%	23,667	10,143
8	Bristol City	15,225	7,5%	23,525	10,207
9	Preston North End	15,136	9,8%	27,284	9,538
10	Queens Park Rangers	14,367	9,9%	25,257	7,616
11	Hull City	13,972	-29,2%	26,091	9,933
12	Swindon Town	13,579	-15,9%	21,595	8,802
13	Blackpool FC	13,483	-34,1%	22,610	8,432
14	Burnley FC	12,893	-20,2%	22,015	8,695
15	Portsmouth FC	11,918	-13,4%	16,058	5,885
16	Luton Town	11,384	-34,4%	17,280	7,270
17	Fulham	11,147	-7,1%	21,187	7,406
18	Watford FC	10,908	-24,0%	22,421	5,384
19	Leyton Orient	10,817	18,6%	33,383	5,202
20	Charlton Athletic	10,430	-5,0%	26,643	7,371
21	Oxford United	9,530	-12,4%	18,990	6,604
22	Carlisle United	9,479	-11,1%	12,279	6,067

=== Division Three ===
No.	Club	Average	±	Highest	Lowest
1	Aston Villa	31,953	21,9%	48,110	23,004
2	Brighton & Hove Albion	17,661	79,8%	34,644	4,509
3	Notts County	13,941	29,6%	34,208	8,921
4	AFC Bournemouth	12,991	49,7%	22,550	8,856
5	Plymouth Argyle	10,799	24,1%	20,129	6,943
6	Bristol Rovers	9,340	-17,4%	20,442	5,427
7	Blackburn Rovers	8,256	2,8%	15,562	5,643
8	Bolton Wanderers	8,173	-6,1%	13,602	5,465
9	Oldham Athletic	8,016	-16,0%	14,530	4,640
10	Chesterfield FC	7,992	-17,1%	12,510	4,542
11	Rotherham United	7,313	-7,3%	15,743	4,161
12	Swansea City	6,412	-20,2%	24,404	2,541
13	Wrexham AFC	6,083	-25,2%	17,162	2,547
14	Mansfield Town	5,988	-12,8%	16,784	3,549
15	Torquay United	5,677	-0,8%	11,165	2,139
16	York City	5,597	6,5%	9,419	3,858
17	Walsall FC	5,445	4,5%	13,092	3,121
18	Barnsley FC	5,341	-21,8%	8,632	2,185
19	Shrewsbury Town	5,265	3,8%	16,336	2,329
20	Bradford City	5,042	-15,9%	9,289	2,468
21	Rochdale AFC	4,387	-9,9%	10,926	2,643
22	Port Vale	4,366	-19,7%	11,106	2,475
23	Tranmere Rovers	4,355	10,3%	12,054	2,320
24	Halifax Town	3,839	-25,2%	7,462	2,021

=== Division Four ===
No.	Club	Average	±	Highest	Lowest
1	Brentford FC	11,738	73,2%	18,521	8,712
2	Grimsby Town	11,315	161,4%	22,660	6,939
3	Southend United	10,461	63,2%	17,303	5,389
4	Lincoln City	7,603	38,3%	16,498	3,033
5	Scunthorpe United	6,099	52,2%	11,754	4,012
6	Reading FC	5,531	-19,7%	11,689	3,136
7	Colchester United	5,429	-3,1%	9,807	3,772
8	Gillingham FC	5,412	27,6%	11,795	3,538
9	Peterborough United	5,115	4,7%	7,118	4,025
10	Cambridge United	4,891	-0,6%	8,591	3,207
11	Northampton Town	4,486	-32,0%	6,220	2,625
12	Doncaster Rovers	4,125	-7,9%	12,320	2,126
13	Aldershot Town	4,056	-24,6%	8,634	2,152
14	Exeter City	3,857	-18,0%	5,144	2,970
15	Hartlepool United	3,793	54,2%	7,156	2,128
16	Bury FC	3,502	-12,3%	5,719	2,557
17	Newport County	3,462	35,8%	7,698	2,367
18	Southport FC	3,254	13,8%	5,371	1,343
19	Chester City	3,002	-41,0%	4,539	1,868
20	Darlington FC	2,552	-15,2%	8,809	1,611
21	Workington AFC	2,487	12,6%	4,329	1,342
22	Stockport County	2,477	-24,3%	3,926	1,596
23	Barrow AFC	2,307	-1,1%	3,656	1,031
24	Crewe Alexandra	2,104	-30,5%	3,710	1,028

== See also ==
- 1971–72 in English football
